= Decoy list =

Manipulation tactic in elections

A decoy or duplicate list is a separate party list used to avoid the compensation mechanism in some forms of mixed-member proportional representation. A party runs all their local constituency candidates on a "fake" party-list, called the decoy list, while asking voters to strategically support the party with their second (i.e. party) vote thus technically advancing for ticket splitting. This keeps seats from the winner-take-all portion of the system from being taken into account when assigning the compensatory seats. If all parties use this strategy, a theoretically proportional system will instead behave like a parallel voting system.

The decoy list strategy can be made less effective or practical (but not eliminated) by the mixed single vote rule, where parties' seats are apportioned based on vote totals for their candidates across all constituencies. The decoy list strategy can also be eliminated by either explicitly implementing parallel voting (severing compensatory linkage) or implementing certain types of vote linkage instead. Other countries have instead attempted to prohibit the strategy, using complex systems of regulations and party registries to prevent parties from exploiting the loophole, with mixed success.

== Function ==
The most common way to achieve mixed-member proportional representation is by seat linkage, which means taking into account seats won by parties in the constituency tier of the system when allocating list seats. This can be subverted by parties pretending not to have won or to have won fewer seats in constituencies either by running their candidates as independents or under a decoy list. In practice, depending on the legal environment, parties may not be able to fully utilize this strategy as they might be required to field a minimum number of candidates under their own name to establish their top-up list or are legally obligated to. Often decoy lists have similar names or electoral symbols to their mother party to avoid confusion. Subverting the seat linkage mechanism is most straightforward, when the system gives voters two votes: one for a local candidate and one for a top-up list, and the voters can split their vote. In this case, the system can be essentially reverted to a parallel voting system (without any compensation to proportionality) if all parties winning constituency seats use this tactic and all voters follow instructions on how to vote tactically.

In the following example, there are 30 compensatory seats to 70 constituency seats. Party A and D outperform in the constituencies, winning more seats of the 100 than they would be entitled to (overhang seats). The additional member system used in Scotland would partially compensate for that, by not giving these parties any more seats. Compare this to parallel voting, where all parties receive their share proportionally from 30 seats regardless of some of them already being overrepresented. However, if Party A fields their candidates on a decoy list (e.g. Party AA) and they still get the same number of votes, the system would not know that those seats were effectively "won" by Party A, so it would not take this into account when allocating list seats.

Under positive vote transfer used in Hungary, decoy lists have no positive effect. A similar election law used for the 1950 Schleswig-Holstein state election additionally banned electoral fusion. The informal electoral alliance, consisting of CDU, FDP and DP and which fielded only one candidate in each constituency, was allowed to participate in the election but barred from winning compensation seats.

		Constituency seats only (FPTP)		Mixed-member majoritarian		Broadly mixed-member proportional type of system (MMP)			
		Constituency seats only (FPTP)		Parallel voting (supplementary member system)		Additional member system (AMS) without decoy lists		Additional member system (AMS) with decoy lists (Party A)	
Party	Popular vote (%)	Seats	Share (%)	Seats	Share (%)	Seats	Share (%)	Seats	Share (%)
Party A	43%	54	77%	67 (54+13)	67%	54 (54+0)	54%	72 (54+18)	72%
Party B	41%	11	16%	24 (11+13)	24%	34 (11+23)	34%	18 (11+7)	18%
Party C	13%	0	0%	4 (0+4)	4%	7 (0+7)	7%	5 (0+5)	5%
Party D	3%	5	7%	5 (5+0)	5%	5 (5+0)	5%	5 (5+0)	5%
TOTAL	100%	70	100%	70+30	100%	70+30	100%	70+30	100%
Index of disproportionality (Gallagher)		31.55 (highly disproportional)		22.01 (disproportional)		10.25 (moderately disproportional)		26.81 (highly disproportional)	
Method used		Only first-past-the-post		Independent PR tier		Fixed number of compensatory seats			
This type of system used in		United Kingdom, among others		Russia, among others		Scotland, London			

== By country ==
=== Albania ===
This sort of strategy for a coalition of parties to capture a larger share of list seats may be adopted formally as a strategy. By way of example, in Albania's 2005 parliamentary election, the two main parties did not expect to win any list seats, so they encouraged voters to use their list votes for allied minor parties. This tactic distorted the working of the model to the point that the parties that won list seats were almost always different from the parties that won constituency seats. Only one constituency member was elected from parties that won list seats. The election was condemned by the Organization for Security and Co-operation in Europe which said it failed to comply with international standards because of "serious irregularities", intimidation, vote-buying and "violence committed by extremists on both sides." Rather than increasing the number of list seats or "overhang" seats, Albania subsequently decided to change to a pure-list system.

In an abusive gambit similar to that used in Albania, major parties feeling that they are unlikely to win a large number of list seats because of their advantage at the constituency level might choose to split their party in two, with one subdivision of the party contesting the constituency seats, while the other contests the list seats—assuming this is allowed by electoral law. The two linked parties could then co-ordinate their campaign and work together within the legislature, while remaining legally separate entities. The result of this approach, if it is used by all parties, would be to transform MMP into a de facto parallel voting mechanism. For the 2009 Albanian parliamentary election, it was replaced by a region-based proportional system.

Party		Constituency	%	Party-Vote	%
Alliance for Freedom, Justice and Welfare	PD	602,066	44.06	104,796	7.67
Alliance for Freedom, Justice and Welfare	PR	—N/a		272,746	19.96
Alliance for Freedom, Justice and Welfare	PDR	—N/a		101,373	7.42
Alliance for Freedom, Justice and Welfare	PDK	—N/a		44,576	3.26
Alliance for Freedom, Justice and Welfare	BLD	—N/a		14,418	1.06
Alliance for Freedom, Justice and Welfare	LDLNJ	—N/a		9,027	0.66
Alliance for Freedom, Justice and Welfare	PBKD	—N/a		7,632	0.56
Alliance for Freedom, Justice and Welfare	PBDSH	—N/a		7,371	0.54
PBK (Note: Originally intended to be part of the PD-alliance but due to lack of signatures not allowed to join.)		1,277	0.09	22,896	1.68
Total		603,343	44.15	584,835	42.81

Party		Constituency	%	Party-Vote	%
Governing coalition (Note: No formal electoral alliance)	PS	538,906	39.44	121,412	8.89
Governing coalition	PSD	18,365	1.34	174,103	12.74
Governing coalition	PBDNJ	12,171	0.89	56,403	4.13
Governing coalition	AD	10,649	0.78	65,093	4.76
Governing coalition	PAA	9,988	0.73	89,635	6.56
Governing coalition	PDSSH	8,514	0.62	57,998	4.25
Governing coalition	Total	603,343	43.80	564,644	41.33

=== Denmark ===
In the 1947 Danish Folketing election, the Copenhagen branch of Venstre ran with their own list and Venstre was thus only party to not be (officially) present in all constituencies. In 1948, the seats were reallocated between the constituencies and national compensation seats and the first seat distribution on regional level was no longer final thus was less preferable for parties with strongholds.

=== Germany ===
In 2012, deputy leader of the SPD faction in Bundestag Ulrich Kelber proposed as an April Fools Day joke the formation of a "SPD direkt" party. Wahlrecht.de stated that the proposal "clearly shows how the current federal electoral law can be reduced ad absurdum."

In the 2024 Brandenburg state election, Alternative for Germany withdrew in Teltow-Fläming II in favour of the mayor of Jüterbog Arne Raue. Brandenburg United Civic Movements/Free Voters called this the "biggest voter deception of this state election." According to the electoral law, the ballots for a successful nonpartisan candidate would be removed from the party votes negating any potential advantage, a provision previously unknown to the AfD.

=== Italy ===
Symbols of the two liste civette
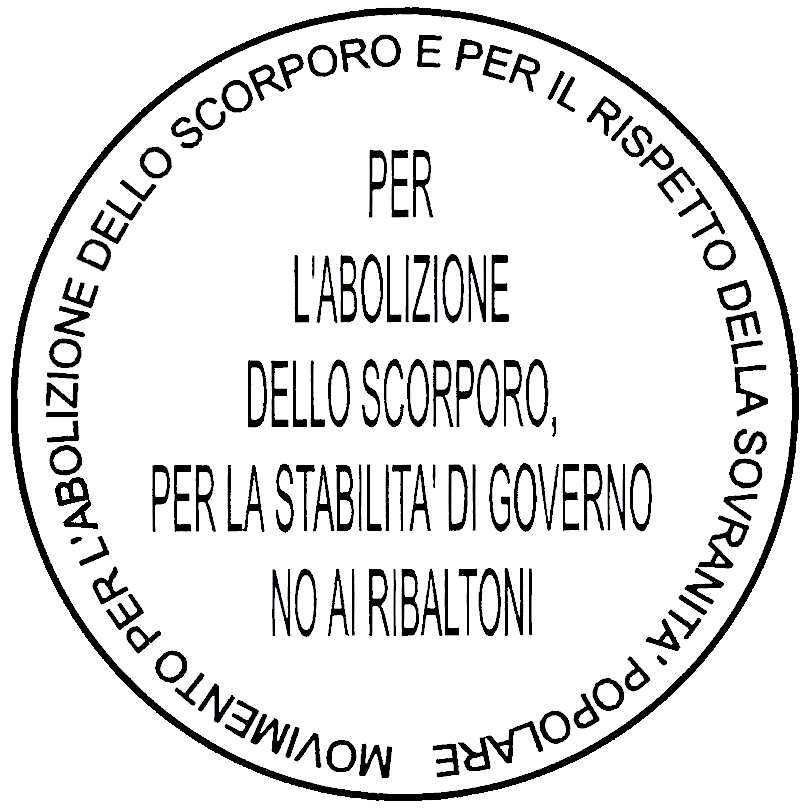
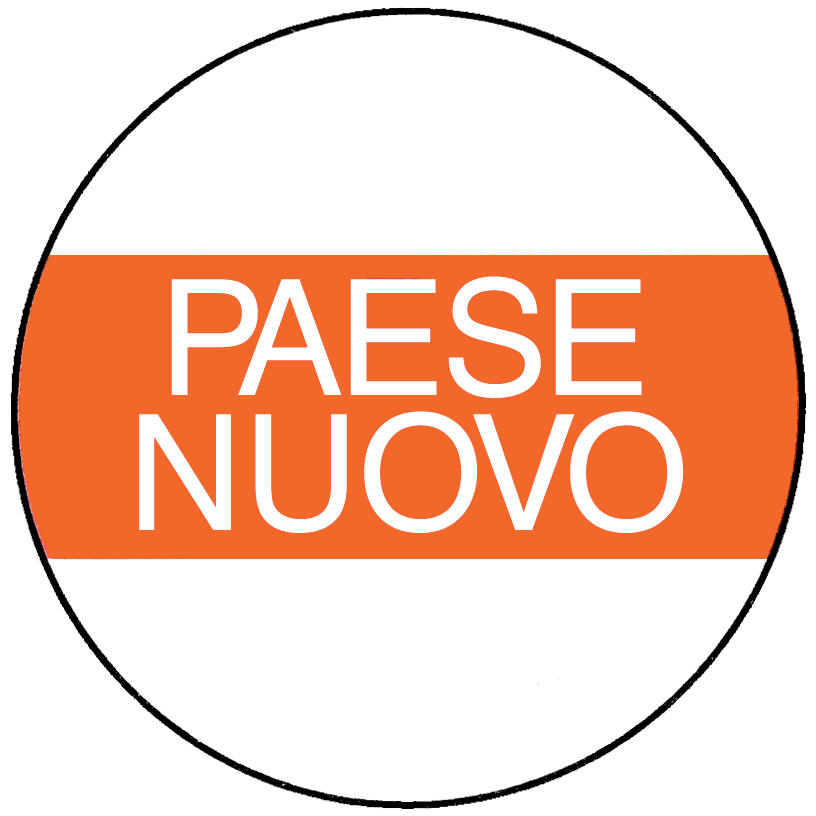

An early example of a decoy list in Italy was the "National List bis", which ran alongside the main National List in the 1924 Italian general election, which took place under the Acerbo Law. The law stated that the largest party with more than 25 percent of all votes cast won 355 of the 535 seats (a two-thirds supermajority) in the Chamber of Deputies, and the remaining 180 were distributed proportionally to other parties. The voting system allowed the National List to win 19 extra seats on top of their supermajority.

After the downfall of the First Republic, a new system called scorporo (similar to the additional member system in the UK) was adopted. In 2001, one of the two main coalitions (the House of Freedoms coalition, which opposed the scorporo system) linked many of their constituency candidates to a decoy list (liste civetta) in the proportional parts, under the name Abolizione Scorporo. This intentionally undermined the compensatory nature of the electoral system. As a defensive move, the other coalition, Olive Tree, felt obliged to do the same, under the name Paese Nuovo. The constituency seats won by each coalition would not reduce the number of proportional seats they received. Between them, the two decoy lists won 360 of the 475 constituency seats, more than half of the total of 630 seats available, despite winning a combined total of less than 0.2% of the national proportional part of the vote. In the case of Forza Italia (part of the House of Freedoms), the tactic was so successful that it did not have enough candidates in the proportional part to receive as many seats as it in fact won, missing out on 12 seats.

Both decoy lists were reused in the 2004 European Parliament election. Greens Greens and Federalist Greens ran with Abolizione Scorporo and the Christian Democracy used Paese Nuovo with both lists having adjusted versions of their 2001 symbols to reflect the actual parties behind them with the formal parties only represented by "fleas" for legal reasons.

=== Lesotho ===
Decoy lists have been used in the 2007 Lesotho general election. In this case the two leading parties, the Lesotho Congress for Democracy (LCD) and the All Basotho Convention (ABC) used decoy lists, respectively named the National Independent Party and the Lesotho Workers' Party to avoid the compensatory mechanisms of the otherwise mixed-member proportional system. As a result, the LCD and its decoy were able to take 69.1% of the seats with only 51.8% of the vote. ABC leader Tom Thabane called the vote "free, but not fair." In the 2012 election, the voting system was adjusted to link the local and list seats to limit the decoy lists' effectiveness, reestablishing proportional representation.

In the 2002 election, there was already confusion between the portrait of Ntsu Mokhehle used by the Lesotho People's Congress (LPC, LCD splitter), the eagle symbol (Sotho: ntsu) of the LCD and the dove symbol of the NIP.

=== South Korea ===
In South Korea, these are referred to as "satellite parties" (Korean: 위성정당). Ahead of the 2020 South Korean legislative election, the electoral system was changed from parallel voting to a hybrid mixed-member proportional system (AMS), with 30 seats allocated in a compensatory manner. The AMS is more disadvantageous for larger parties like the UFP and Democratic Party (DP) than the prior system, which did not compensate parties for differences between their popular vote percentage and seat percentage, as the two major parties have generally won a larger percentage of seats than their popular vote percentage. The opposition Liberty Korea Party subsequently set up a decoy list, the Future Korea Party, to win extra proportional seats. The ruling Democratic Party of Korea (DPK) condemned them for exploiting the electoral law, but nonetheless set up its own decoy list, the Platform Party, in response. The small evangelical Christian Liberty Unification Party also attempted to create a decoy list with the Liberty Unification Party. The decoy lists were successful on election day, with Future Korea winning 12 compensatory seats and Platform winning 11. After the election, both satellite parties merged into their mother parties.

In the 2024 legislative election, the same electoral system was in use thus two new decoy lists were formed, the Democratic Alliance of Korea for the DPK (which also included minor progressive parties) and the People Future Party for the People Power Party. Rebuilding Korea Party, which only ran as a party list, has also been described as a satellite party of DPK.

Logo of the UFP

Logo of the FKP

Logo of the PPP

Logo of the PFP

Logo of the DPK (2020)

Logo of the PP

Logo of the DPK (2024)

Logo of the DAK

=== United Kingdom ===
In contrast, in the 2007 Welsh Assembly election, Forward Wales had its candidates (including sitting leader John Marek) stand as independents, to attempt to gain list seats they would not be entitled to if Forward Wales candidates were elected to constituencies in the given region. However the ruse failed: Marek lost his seat in Wrexham and Forward Wales failed to qualify for any top-up seats.

In the 2021 Scottish Parliament election, former SNP leader, Alex Salmond announced his leadership of the newly formed Alba Party, with the stated aim of winning list seats for pro-independence candidates. At the party's public launch, Salmond quoted polling suggesting the SNP would receive a million votes in the forthcoming election but win no regional seats. He said that having Alba candidates on the regional lists would end the "wasted votes", and the number of independence supporting MSPs could reach 90 or more. While Alba was largely unsuccessful, the Scottish Greens were noted to have benefited from tactical voting by separatist voters. All for Unity proposed a similar alliance for the unionist parties.

=== Venezuela ===
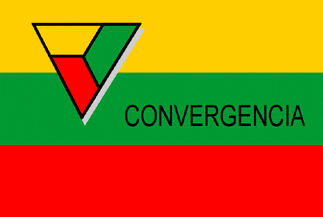
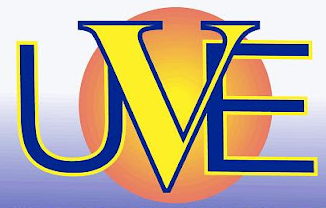
National Convergence and LAPY (left) and Fifth Republic Movement and Unidad de Vencedores Electorales (right).

Another interesting case is that of Venezuela, which also ended up changing its system, in this case by formally adopting a parallel voting system and legitimizing party efforts to game the MMP approach. Venezuela introduced an MMP electoral system in 1993, but the tactic of creating a decoy party was introduced only in 2000, by the opposition governor of Yaracuy. The tactic was later adopted by pro-Chavez parties at the national level in 2005. Decoy lists became known as morochas (lit. 'twins'). After the decoy list tactic withstood a constitutional challenge, Venezuela eventually formally reverted to a parallel voting system, which yields a lesser degree of proportionality compared to MMP. On September 26, 2010, Chavez' party, the United Socialist Party of Venezuela, took 57.4% of parliamentary seats with only 48.2% of the vote under the new system (ignoring the role of small allied parties).

== See also ==
- Bloc party
- Interventions of political parties in Venezuela
- Spoiler effect
