= 2013 Albanian parliamentary election =

- 23 June 2013
- All 140 seats in the Parliament of Albania; 71 seats needed for a majority
- Turnout: 53.46% (▲2.69pp)
Party	Leader	Vote %	Seats	+/–
Alliance for a European Albania (83 seats)
PS	Edi Rama	41.36	65	0
LSI	Ilir Meta	10.46	16	+12
PBDNJ	Vangjel Dule	0.85	1	0
PKDSH	Dhimitër Muslia	0.46	1	New
Alliance for Employment, Prosperity and Integration (57 seats)
PD	Sali Berisha	30.63	50	−18
PR	Fatmir Mediu	3.02	3	+2
PDIU	Shpëtim Idrizi	2.61	4	+3
This lists parties that won seats. See the complete results below.

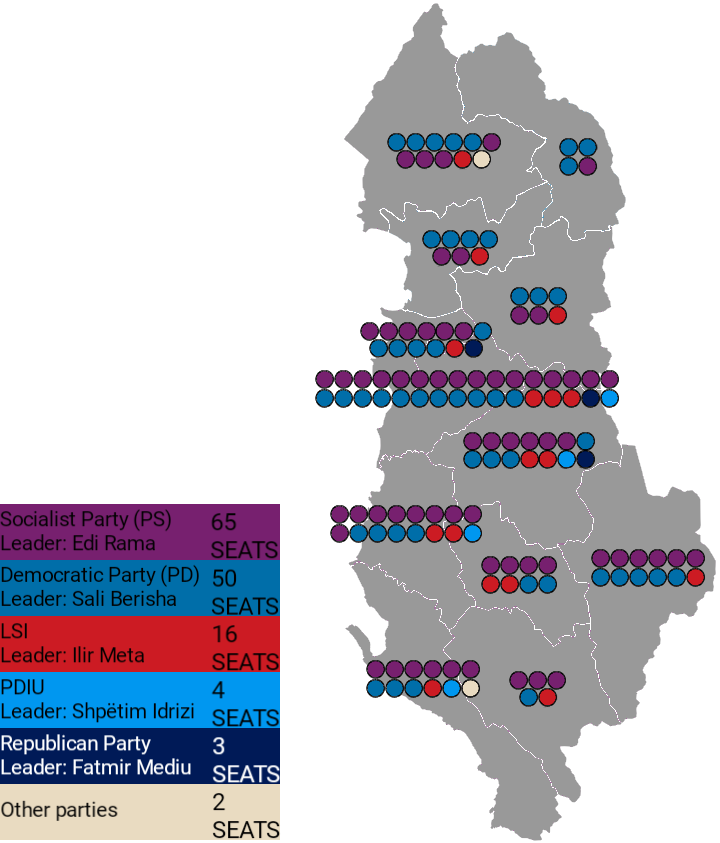
Prime Minister before	Prime Minister after
Sali Berisha; PD	Edi Rama; PS

Parliamentary elections were held in Albania on 23 June 2013. The result was a victory for the Alliance for a European Albania led by the Socialist Party and its leader, Edi Rama. Incumbent Prime Minister Sali Berisha of the Democratic Party-led Alliance for Employment, Prosperity and Integration conceded defeat on 26 June.

== Background ==
The previous parliamentary elections were held on 28 June 2009 and resulted in a victory for the Democratic Party of Albania-led Alliance of Change, which received 46.92 of the vote, winning 70 of the 140 seats. The opposition Union for Change headed by Edi Rama of the Socialist Party received almost 45.34% of the vote and won the other 66 seats. The Democratic Party led by Sali Berisha formed the government with Berisha as Prime Minister.

== Electoral system ==
The 140 members of Parliament were elected in twelve multi-member constituencies based on the twelve counties using closed list proportional representation with an electoral threshold of 3% for parties and 5% for alliances. Seats were allocated to alliances using the d'Hondt method, then to political parties using the Sainte-Laguë method.

#	County	Seats
1	Berat	8
2	Dibër	6
3	Durrës	13
4	Elbasan	14
5	Fier	16
6	Gjirokastër	5
7	Korçë	12
8	Kukës	4
9	Lezhë	7
10	Shkodër	11
11	Tirana	32
12	Vlorë	12

== Alliances ==
Prior to the election two major coalitions were formed, whilst four parties and two independent candidates ran alone. In total there were 66 parties.

- Alliance for Employment, Prosperity and Integration (Aleanca për Punësim, Mirëqenie dhe Integrim) is a coalition of 25 centrist and center-right parties. It was led by the then Prime Minister, Sali Berisha.
- Alliance for a European Albania (Aleanca për Shqipërinë Europiane) is a big tent coalition containing 37 opposition parties that vary from far left to right-wing. It was led by the then Leader of the Opposition, now Prime Minister, Edi Rama.

== Opinion polls ==
=== By party ===
Pollster	Date	PD	PS	AK	LSI	FRD	PDIU	Participation
Party polling
Kult	8–14 December 2012	29.6%	36.5%	14.1%	4.7%	4.1%		71.0%
Gazeta Dita	17–20 December 2012 (Note: Only in the municipality of Tirana)	31.0%	37.1%	6.5%	6.6%	5.3%		
AlbStat	28 December 2012	31.4%	40.4%	15.2%	4.9%	4.9%		77.1%
AlbStat	21–28 January 2013	31.2%	41.2%	15.0%	5.5%	5.5%		77.5%
Kult	22–31 January 2013	30.1%	41.2%	14.9%	4.1%	4.1%		75%
Soros	February 2013	22.7%	19.6%	1.2%	1.0%	1.3%	1.0%	52.2%
Istituto Piepoli	May 2013	37.5%	42.5%	2.5%	5%	5%		797
IPR Marketing	May/June 2013	38.5%	40%	2%	6.3%	3.7%	1.7%	1000
Istituto Piepoli	June 2013	38%	42.5%	2.5%	5.5%	3.5%		1000

=== By alliance ===
Pollster	Date	APMI	ASHE	AK	FRD	Participation
Istituto Piepoli	May 2013	42.5%	50.5%	2.5%	5%	797
IPR Marketing	May/June 2013	43%	50%	2%	3.7%	1,000
Istituto Piepoli	June 2013	42.5%	51%	2.5%	3.5%	1,000
NOA Agency	May 2013	58.8%	41.2%			8,177
Albeu	May 2013	42.5%	43.3%	8.5%	3.4%	20,886
Seats polling
Pollster	Date	APMI	ASHE	AK	FRD	Participation
Istituto Piepoli	June 2013	66	73	0	1	1,000

== Conduct ==
The Central Election Commission was criticised for not replacing three of the seven member committee who had resigned in April following a dispute between the government and the opposition.

On election day, a shootout occurred in Laç resulting in the death of the LSI activist Gjon Pjeter Gjoni and injuring the PD candidate Mhill Fufi.

== Results ==
Party or alliance		Votes	%	Seats	+/–
Alliance for a European Albania	Socialist Party of Albania	713,407	41.36	65	0
Alliance for a European Albania	Socialist Movement for Integration	180,470	10.46	16	+12
Alliance for a European Albania	Unity for Human Rights Party	14,722	0.85	1	0
Alliance for a European Albania	Social Democracy Party of Albania	11,891	0.69	0	0
Alliance for a European Albania	Social Democratic Party of Albania	10,220	0.59	0	0
Alliance for a European Albania	People's Alliance	8,927	0.52	0	New
Alliance for a European Albania	Christian Democratic Party of Albania	7,993	0.46	1	New
Alliance for a European Albania	Real Socialist Party 91	6,135	0.36	0	0
Alliance for a European Albania	Democratic Party for Integration and Prosperity	4,550	0.26	0	New
Alliance for a European Albania	National Arbëreshë Alliance	3,575	0.21	0	New
Alliance for a European Albania	Moderated Socialist Party	3,119	0.18	0	New
Alliance for a European Albania	G99	2,977	0.17	0	0
Alliance for a European Albania	Law and Justice Party	2,489	0.14	0	0
Alliance for a European Albania	Albanian Future Party	2,284	0.13	0	New
Alliance for a European Albania	Party for the Defence of the Rights of the Emigrants	2,275	0.13	0	0
Alliance for a European Albania	Albanian Social Labour Party	2,174	0.13	0	New
Alliance for a European Albania	Green Party of Albania	2,084	0.12	0	0
Alliance for a European Albania	Albanian Party of Democratic Reforms	1,371	0.08	0	0
Alliance for a European Albania	Communist Party of Albania 8 November	1,352	0.08	0	New
Alliance for a European Albania	Party of the Liberal Right Thought	1,210	0.07	0	New
Alliance for a European Albania	Democratic Movement for Change	1,159	0.07	0	New
Alliance for a European Albania	Albanian Labour Party	955	0.06	0	New
Alliance for a European Albania	Christian Democratic Alliance	905	0.05	0	New
Alliance for a European Albania	Communist Party of Albania	901	0.05	0	New
Alliance for a European Albania	Path of Freedom Party	808	0.05	0	0
Alliance for a European Albania	Alliance for Equality and European Justice	728	0.04	0	New
Alliance for a European Albania	Reorganised Party of Labour of Albania	623	0.04	0	New
Alliance for a European Albania	Albanian Homeland Party	555	0.03	0	New
Alliance for a European Albania	Albanian National Reconciliation Party	545	0.03	0	New
Alliance for a European Albania	National Unity Party	513	0.03	0	New
Alliance for a European Albania	Albanian Movement for Justice	508	0.03	0	New
Alliance for a European Albania	Albanian Republican Unon	489	0.03	0	New
Alliance for a European Albania	Albanian Affairs Party	476	0.03	0	New
Alliance for a European Albania	Party of Disabled People	459	0.03	0	New
Alliance for a European Albania	Environmental Party	452	0.03	0	New
Alliance for a European Albania	Albanian Workers Movement Party	316	0.02	0	New
Alliance for a European Albania	New Tolerance Party	287	0.02	0	0
Alliance for a European Albania	Total	993,904	57.63	83	–
Alliance for Employment, Prosperity and Integration	Democratic Party of Albania	528,373	30.63	50	–18
Alliance for Employment, Prosperity and Integration	Republican Party of Albania	52,168	3.02	3	+2
Alliance for Employment, Prosperity and Integration	Party for Justice, Integration and Unity	44,957	2.61	4	+3
Alliance for Employment, Prosperity and Integration	Demochristian Party of Albania	13,288	0.77	0	0
Alliance for Employment, Prosperity and Integration	Legality Movement Party	6,089	0.35	0	0
Alliance for Employment, Prosperity and Integration	Movement for National Development	5,429	0.31	0	0
Alliance for Employment, Prosperity and Integration	Albanian National Front Party	4,868	0.28	0	0
Alliance for Employment, Prosperity and Integration	Ethnic Greek Minority for the Future	3,305	0.19	0	New
Alliance for Employment, Prosperity and Integration	Liberal Democratic Union	2,681	0.16	0	0
Alliance for Employment, Prosperity and Integration	Environmentalist Agrarian Party	2,640	0.15	0	0
Alliance for Employment, Prosperity and Integration	Albanian Emigration Party	2,325	0.13	0	New
Alliance for Employment, Prosperity and Integration	New Albania Movement	2,320	0.13	0	New
Alliance for Employment, Prosperity and Integration	Democratic National Front Party	2,242	0.13	0	0
Alliance for Employment, Prosperity and Integration	Democratic Alliance Party	1,384	0.08	0	0
Alliance for Employment, Prosperity and Integration	Macedonian Alliance for European Integration	1,229	0.07	0	0
Alliance for Employment, Prosperity and Integration	Albanian Christian Democratic Movement	1,190	0.07	0	New
Alliance for Employment, Prosperity and Integration	Alliance for Democracy and Solidarity	1,065	0.06	0	0
Alliance for Employment, Prosperity and Integration	New European Democracy Party	970	0.06	0	0
Alliance for Employment, Prosperity and Integration	Time of Albania	770	0.04	0	New
Alliance for Employment, Prosperity and Integration	Party of the Real Albanian Path	635	0.04	0	New
Alliance for Employment, Prosperity and Integration	Conservative Party	633	0.04	0	0
Alliance for Employment, Prosperity and Integration	Albanian Democratic Union Party	606	0.04	0	New
Alliance for Employment, Prosperity and Integration	Party of Denied Rights	554	0.03	0	New
Alliance for Employment, Prosperity and Integration	New Party of Denied Rights	550	0.03	0	0
Alliance for Employment, Prosperity and Integration	Peoples Union of Albanian Retirees Party	406	0.02	0	New
Alliance for Employment, Prosperity and Integration	Total	680,677	39.46	57	–
New Democratic Spirit		29,310	1.70	0	New
Red and Black Alliance		10,196	0.59	0	New
League for Justice and Progress		1,068	0.06	0	New
Christian Democratic People's Party of Albania		416	0.02	0	New
Independents		9,208	0.53	0	0
Total		1,724,779	100.00	140	0
Valid votes		1,724,779	98.61		
Invalid/blank votes		24,279	1.39		
Total votes		1,749,058	100.00		
Registered voters/turnout		3,271,885	53.46		
Source: CEC, CEC

=== By county ===
County		Socialist			Democratic			LSI			PDIU			Republican			Other parties		
County	Seats	Votes	%	S	Votes	%	S	Votes	%	S	Votes	%	S	Votes	%	S	Votes	%	S
Berat	8	42,897	46.94%	4	19,022	20.81%	2	21,549	23.58%	2	783	0.86%	0	1,962	2.15%	0	5,183	5.67%	0
Dibër	6	25,103	33.66%	2	30,137	40.41%	3	10,019	13.43%	1	248	0.33%	0	2,219	2.98%	0	6,856	9.19%	0
Durrës	13	60,833	39.24%	6	52,703	34.00%	5	11,605	7.49%	1	3,785	2.44%	0	10,519	6.79%	1	15,586	10.05%	0
Elbasan	14	75,086	43.26%	6	46,788	29.96%	4	18,484	10.65%	2	12,110	6.98%	1	6,266	3.61%	1	14,842	8.55%	0
Fier	16	89,637	44.18%	9	46,374	22.86%	4	19,677	9.70%	2	9,058	4.46%	1	3,881	1.91%	0	34,235	16.87%	0
Gjirokastër	5	25,148	42.36%	3	13,509	22.76%	1	11,534	19.43%	1	196	0.33%	0	2,642	4.45%	0	6,332	10.67%	0
Korçë	12	63,584	43.50%	6	47,061	32.20%	5	14,416	9.86%	1	1,440	0.99%	0	4,442	3.03%	0	15,216	10.41%	0
Kukës	4	11,384	24.32%	1	22,428	47.91%	3	5,648	12.06%	0	541	1.16%	0	2,397	5.12%	0	4,419	9.44%	0
Lezhë	7	26,433	32.90%	2	31,605	39.34%	4	8,820	10.98%	1	594	0.74%	0	1,388	1.73%	0	11,503	14.32%	0
Shkodër	11	37,984	31.12%	4	45,799	37.53%	5	12,772	10.46%	1	247	0.20%	0	4,930	4.04%	0	20,312	16.65%	1
Tiranë	32	198,837	44.05%	16	151,472	33.56%	11	35,394	7.84%	3	9,173	2.03%	1	10,561	2.34%	1	45,970	10.18%	0
Vlorë	12	56,481	46.62%	6	21,475	17.72%	3	10,552	8.71%	1	6,782	5.60%	1	981	0.81%	0	24,890	20.54%	1
Albania		713,407	41.36%	65	528,373	30.63%	50	180,470	10.46%	16	44,957	2.61%	4	52,168	3.02%	3	205,404	11.91%	2

== Aftermath ==
Early on election day both Sali Berisha and Edi Rama claimed victory. On 25 June, Edi Rama gave his victory speech saying, "I will be your prime minister, but also your prime servant. The duty will be mine; the authority will be yours." On 26 June, after vote counting was finally complete, the outgoing Prime Minister, Sali Berisha, publicly accepted the result, took responsibility for the loss, resigned from his functions in the Democratic Party, and wished his opponent well in his new duties.
