= 2021 Albanian parliamentary election =

- 25 April 2021
- All 140 seats in Parliament; 71 seats needed for a majority
- Turnout: 46.29% (▼0.46pp)
Party	Leader	Vote %	Seats	+/–
PS	Edi Rama	48.67	74	0
PD–AN (Note: Alliance led by PD. The other members are PDIU, PR, PAA, LZHK, PDK, FRD, PBKD, PBDNJ, BLD, PBD, PLL, PKD)	Lulzim Basha	39.43	59	+16
LSI	Monika Kryemadhi	6.81	4	−15
PSD	Tom Doshi	2.25	3	+2
This lists parties that won seats. See the complete results below.
Result by constituency
Prime Minister before	Prime Minister after
Edi Rama; PS	Edi Rama; PS

Parliamentary elections were held in Albania on 25 April 2021 amid the COVID-19 pandemic to elect the 140 members of the parliament. A total of 1,871 candidates, including 732 women, were registered, with ten political parties, two coalitions and three independent candidates contesting the election. The Socialist Party (PS), led by incumbent Prime Minister Edi Rama, opted for an independent participation, while the opposition Democratic Party (PD), under Lulzim Basha, formed the Democratic Party – Alliance for Change (PD – AN), a coalition with 12 smaller parties. Other notable political entities, including the Socialist Movement for Integration (LSI) and the Social Democratic Party (PSD), also pursued electoral success independently. The election campaign was highly polarised, with competing narratives centered on pressing national issues such as European Union (EU) accession, economic development, healthcare reform, infrastructure modernisation, and the government's handling of the COVID-19 crisis. Campaign strategies were significantly altered due to the pandemic, with political parties increasingly relying on digital platforms and social media to reach voters, as traditional in-person events were limited by public health restrictions.

Voter turnout was recorded at 46%, with 1,661,176 voters casting their ballots. The PS emerged as the dominant political force, securing 49% of the vote, which translated into 74 seats in parliament, thereby maintaining its parliamentary majority. This marked a third consecutive victory for the PS and Prime Minister Rama. The PD – AN coalition experienced a notable recovery compared to previous electoral cycles, securing 39% of the vote and winning 59 seats. Conversely, the LSI suffered a sharp decline, losing 15 seats and securing just four seats overall, while the PSD contested the elections with limited success. One of the key challenges in the election was the high rate of invalid votes, 83,059 ballots, 5% of the total, were invalid, primarily due to voter confusion with the new ballot design, which only displayed candidate numbers rather than names for preferential votes.

Prime Minister Rama's government received a vote of confidence in parliament on 10 September 2021, enabling the formation of his third cabinet. Subsequently, on 18 September, the cabinet was formally sworn in, with a renewed focus on earthquake reconstruction, economic recovery, pandemic management, and efforts to strengthen the rule of law. The new administration's priorities included the continued rebuilding of infrastructure following the devastating 2019 earthquake, as well as the implementation of reforms aimed at modernising Albania's economy and improving the welfare system. These efforts were framed within the context of Albania's aspirations for EU integration.

== Background ==
Following the 2017 parliamentary elections the Socialist Party (PS), led by Prime Minister Edi Rama, secured a second consecutive term. The PS maintained a dominant position in the parliament, winning 74 of the 140 seats. The Democratic Party (PD) followed with 43 seats, while the Socialist Movement for Integration (LSI) obtained 19 seats. Other parties represented included the Party for Justice, Integration and Unity (PDIU), with three seats, and the Social Democratic Party (PSD), with one seat. By early 2019, an unrest arose as the opposition, particularly the PD and LSI, expressed intense dissatisfaction with the administration of Rama, citing allegations of perceived corruption and electoral fraud. Both parties rescinded all their parliamentary mandates after the government voted down their initiative for the vetting of politicians. This discontent led to their boycott of the municipal elections, as they claimed the process was neither free nor fair. It resulted in the Komisioni Qendror i Zgjedhjeve (KQZ) reallocating vacant seats to remaining registered candidates. The situation became further complicated by a confrontation between President Ilir Meta and Rama, with the former attempting to annul the municipal elections through a presidential decree, which prompted the latter to seek the dismissal of the president. In November 2019, Albania was struck by a 6.4 magnitude earthquake centered near Durrës that resulted in substantial casualties and extensive infrastructural damage.

In March 2020, Albania encountered additional complexities with the emergence of the COVID-19 pandemic. The government instituted a comprehensive set of public health measures, including nationwide lockdowns, travel restrictions, and the enforcement of social distancing protocols, which resulted in profound economic repercussions. In June, an agreement was reached to implement a depoliticised electoral administration, consistent with recommendations from the Organization for Security and Co-operation in Europe (OSCE), which included the introduction of electronic voter identification and the restructuring of the KQZ. Subsequently, on 23 July, the parliament adopted amendments to the electoral code, followed by constitutional revisions on 30 July. The parliament further initiated impeachment proceedings against Meta, however, an inquiry committee concluded that he had overstepped his constitutional authority by postponing municipal elections, impeachment was not warranted. On 5 October 2020, the parliament approved further amendments to the electoral code, aimed at enhancing gender representation, safeguarding public resources, and reforming candidate verification, nomination processes, campaign financing, and dispute mechanisms.

=== COVID-19 measures ===
Amid the COVID-19 pandemic, the Ministry of Health and Social Protection implemented a comprehensive protocol to guarantee the safety of voters and electoral personnel during the election on 25 April. Approved on 13 April, the protocol aimed to prevent virus transmission and maintain electoral integrity. It specified that voting centers had to be located on the ground floor of buildings with proper ventilation. All personnel and observers were required to complete a self-declaration form confirming the absence of COVID-19 symptoms, which included a mandatory temperature check. Observers, both party-affiliated and independent, were allowed to monitor all phases of the electoral process without obstruction. Disinfection protocols were crucial, requiring voting spaces to be disinfected one day before the election and at regular intervals throughout the voting period. Hand sanitizers were made available at the entrance and throughout the area to promote hygiene.

Strict social distancing guidelines limited the number of voters inside each voting center to the number of secret voting booths plus two additional individuals, with individuals waiting to vote required to maintain a distance of at least 1.5 meters. Personal protective equipment, including masks, was mandatory for all election commission members and accredited observers, who had to wear masks at all times while inside the voting center. On election day, voters were required to sanitize their hands and wear masks before entering the polling area, while election officials managed orderly voter movements to facilitate social distancing. Notably, 23,625 citizens infected with COVID-19 were unable to participate in the elections due to isolation protocols. Furthermore, Albanian citizens returning from Greece and North Macedonia shortly before the election were barred from voting because of a 14-day quarantine mandate imposed by the Technical Committee of Experts on 19 April. This decision prompted significant debate among the participating political parties and coalition but was upheld by the Administrative Court of Appeal.

== Electoral system ==
The electoral system of Albania is constructed upon the principles defined in the constitution and the electoral code. As a parliamentary constitutional republic, Albania implements a regional proportional representation method that allocates seats in the parliament according to the proportion of votes garnered by political parties in a multi-party system. The parliament is composed of 140 representatives with a term of four years, where 100 members are elected directly from multi-member constituencies and 40 members from multi-name lists of parties or coalitions. The constitution codifies substantial democratic principles, stipulating that voting rights are equal, free, and conducted through secret ballot. All citizens of Albania, upon reaching the age of 18 and have not been deprived of voting rights, are permitted to participate in elections. The electoral code also establishes comprehensive procedures for voter registration, ensuring that all eligible citizens can participate fully in the process. The allocation of representatives in the parliament is integrated on population size within 12 electoral districts, which correspond to the administrative regions of Albania. To ensure proportional representation, the d'Hondt method is employed for seat distribution, contingent upon an electoral threshold of 1%. This method facilitates a fair allocation of seats relative to the number of registered citizens in each district of Albania.

Seat distribution for 2021
#	County	Seats	Ch.
1	Berat	7	Steady
2	Dibër	5	▼1
3	Durrës	14	Steady
4	Elbasan	14	Steady
5	Fier	16	Steady
6	Gjirokastër	4	▼1
7	Korçë	11	Steady
8	Kukës	3	Steady
9	Lezhë	7	Steady
10	Shkodër	11	Steady
11	Tirana	36	▲2
12	Vlorë	12	Steady

=== Election date ===
According to the constitution, parliamentary elections in Albania are required to be conducted no later than 60 days and no earlier than 30 days prior to the expiration of the parliament's mandate. On 4 September 2020, President Ilir Meta initiated several consultations to determine the election date for the upcoming parliamentary elections, inviting representatives from both parliamentary and non-parliamentary political parties to the Presidenca. The aim of the consultations was to ensure an organised and transparent electoral process. Lulzim Basha of the Democratic Party (PD) proposed 18 April 2021 as the optimal election date, a suggestion that garnered support from other political leaders and smaller party representatives. Edi Rama of the Socialist Party (PS) expressed a willingness to consider various dates but opposed 2 May due to its conflict with Easter celebrations. Rudina Hajdari of Nisma Thurje countered with the suggestion of 2 May, arguing that elections could be conducted on holidays without compromising the democratic process. This sentiment was echoed by Arben Tafaj of the Agrarian Party and Vangjel Dule of the Unity for Human Rights Party, who advocated for holding elections at the earliest possible opportunity. Conclusively, on 6 September, Meta announced that the 2021 elections would be scheduled for 25 April 2021.

=== Parliamentary parties ===
As of the electoral code, a parliamentary party is defined as a political organisation that has achieved representation in the parliament by obtaining a minimum of one seat in the most recent electoral contest. Subsequent to the 2017 parliamentary election, the PS obtained 74 of the 140 seats, emerging as the majority party. The PD secured 43 seats, while the Socialist Movement for Integration acquired 19 seats. Further, the Party for Justice, Integration, and Unity received 3 seats, and the Social Democratic Party attained 1 seat.

Name		Ideology	Position	Leader	2017 result	
Name		Ideology	Position	Leader	Votes (%)	Seats
PS	Socialist Party of Albania; Partia Socialiste e Shqipërisë	Social democracy	Centre-left	Edi Rama	48.34	74 / 140
PD	Democratic Party of Albania; Partia Demokratike e Shqipërisë	Conservatism	Centre-right	Lulzim Basha	28.85	43 / 140
LSI	Socialist Movement for Integration; Lëvizja Socialiste për Integrim	Social democracy	Centre-left	Monika Kryemadhi	14.28	19 / 140
PDIU	Party for Justice, Integration and Unity; Partia Drejtësi, Integrim dhe Unitet	Minority	Right-wing	Shpëtim Idrizi	4.81	3 / 140
PSD	Social Democratic Party of Albania; Partia Socialdemokrate e Shqipërisë	Social democracy	Centre-left	Engjell Bejtja	0.95	1 / 140

== Parties and coalitions ==
According to the electoral code, each political party is mandated to submit a registration request to the KQZ no later than 70 days prior to the scheduled election date. This request must comprehensively contain several critical components, including the identity of the party chair authorised to present candidates, the official name and acronym of the party, a specimen of the official stamp, and the contact information for both the finance officer and communication officer. Registered political parties have the option to form coalitions, which must also be registered with the KQZ at least 60 days before the election. A political party that is part of a coalition is restricted from engaging in another coalition or presenting candidates independently. The coalition is required to designate a leading party, which assumes the responsibility for fulfilling the legal obligations formed in the electoral code, and to document inter-party relations in a formal coalition agreement submitted to the KQZ. It is essential that both political parties and coalitions submit a multi-name list of candidates for the parliament election no later than 50 days prior to the election. For the 2021 parliamentary elections, the Socialist Party opted to participate independently, stating its intention to avoid political coalitions. The Democratic Party formed a coalition called the Democratic Party-Alliance for Change (PD-AN) with 12 other parties to present a unified candidate list. The Socialist Movement for Integration also announced its intention to compete independently, while indicating plans to corporate with the two major opposition parties in the counties of Dibër, Gjirokastër and Kukës to create a joint candidate list. However, the KQZ did not register the Party for Albanian People's Welfare, the Labor Party of Albania, and the Party for the Defense of Albanian Workers' Rights due to the absence of a designated bank account number in their submissions. Furthermore, the coalition National Hour Alliance – Emigration – People's Union and Conservatives (AOKBPEK) was formed by the Conservative Party, comprising four parties.

=== Electoral lists ===
On 1 April 2021, the KQZ confirmed the electoral lists for the 2021 parliamentary elections. Political parties were required to register by 15 February, while coalitions had until 25 February to complete their registration. A total of 1,871 candidates were registered, of which 732 were women, aligning with the electoral code's mandate that at least one third of candidates from the underrepresented gender must be included on each list. The code also stipulates that candidate lists must incorporate at least one woman for every three candidates, starting from the first position, although the specifics regarding sequencing were somewhat ambiguous. Candidates were required to submit lists for each of the 12 electoral districts, with parties needing to collect 5,000 voter signatures and coalitions 7,000 signatures to validate their participation. However, parliamentary parties and coalitions that jointly hold a number of parliamentary seats equal to or exceeding the number of parties in the coalition were exempt from this signature requirement. A total of 49 party requests were submitted, with 46 parties and three coalitions registered. The final candidate lists consisted of ten parties, two coalitions, and five independent candidates. Independent candidates could enter the election by being nominated by a group of voters, but they were restricted to appearing on only one list. Furthermore, voters were permitted to support multiple candidate lists throughout the electoral process.

Party or coalition		Leader	Ideology	Position	Ref.
ADR	New Democracy Alliance Party; Partia Aleanca Demokracia e Re	Edmond Stojku			
AOKBPEK	National Hour Alliance – Emigration – People's Union and Conservatives; Aleanca Ora Kombëtare – Emigracioni – Bashkimi Popullor dhe Konservatorët) Composition: Conservative Party of Albania (KONS) Partia Konservatore e Shqipërisë; Albanian People's Union of Pensioners (PBPPSH) Partia Bashkimi Popullor i Pensionisteve Shqiptare; Albanian Emigration Party (PESH) Partia e Emigracionit Shqiptar; Hour of Albania Party (PO) Partia Ora e Shqipërisë	Kujtim Gjuzi	Conservatism		
BD	Democratic Conviction; Partia Bindja Demokratike	Astrit Patozi	Pro-Europeanism	Centre-right	
LN	Movement for Change; Partia Lëvizja për Ndryshim	Jozefina Topalli	Pro-Europeanism		
LRE	New Movement Party; Partia Lëvizja e Re	Arian Galdini	Albanian nationalism	Right	
LSI	Socialist Movement for Integration; Lëvizja Socialiste për Integrim	Monika Kryemadhi	Social democracy	Center-left	
NTH	Hashtag Initiative; Nisma Thurje	Endri Shabani	Pro-Europeanism	Center	
PBK	Albanian National Front Party; Partia Balli Kombëtar Shqiptar	Adriatik Alimadhi	Albanian nationalism	Right	
PD – AN	Democratic Party – Alliance for Change; Partia Demokratike – Aleanca për Ndryshim Composition: Democratic Party of Albania (PD) Partia Demokratike; Liberal Democratic Union (BLD) Bashkimi Liberal Demokrat; New Democratic Spirit Fryma e Re Demokratike (FRD); Movement for National Development (LZHK) Lëvizja për Zhvillim Kombëtar; Environmentalist Agrarian Party (PAA) Partia Agrare Ambientaliste; Democratic Union Party (PBD) Partia Bashkimi Demokrat; Unity for Human Rights Party (PBDNJ) Partia Bashkimi për të Drejtat e Njeriut; Democratic National Front Party (PBKD) Partia Balli Kombëtar Demokrat; Demochristian Party of Albania (PDK) Partia Demokristiane e Shqipërisë; Party for Justice, Integration and Unity (PDIU) Partia për Drejtësi, Integrim dhe Unitet; Christian Democratic Party (PKD) Partia Kristian Demokrate; Legality Movement Party (PLL) Partia Lëvizja e Legalitetit; Republican Party of Albania (PR) Partia Republikane Shqiptare	Lulzim Basha	Conservatism	Center-right	
PLDSH	Albanian Democratic Movement Party; Partia Lëvizja Demokratike Shqiptare	Myslim Murrizi			
PS	Socialist Party of Albania; Partia Socialiste e Shqipërisë	Edi Rama	Social democracy	Center-left	
PSD	Social Democratic Party of Albania; Partia Socialdemokrate e Shqipërisë	Tom Doshi	Social democracy	Center-left	

== Campaign ==
Election campaigns in Albania are regulated to initiate 30 days before the scheduled election date and must conclude 24 hours prior to voting. The day preceding and election day are designated as periods of electoral silence, during which all campaigning is prohibited. The 2021 campaign commenced on 26 March, although several parties, including the Socialist Party and the Democratic Party – Alliance for Change, engaged in preliminary activities and political advertising prior to this date. The campaign was highly polarised, with the discourse centered on European Union accession, economic growth, infrastructure modernisation, healthcare, democratic reforms, and the government's response to the COVID-19 pandemic. The pandemic necessitated a shift towards digital campaigning, as large rallies were replaced by online platforms. Increased internet accessibility and social media usage led political parties to focus on these channels for voter engagement.

A detailed analysis by the Balkan Investigative Reporting Network (BIRN) investigated the impact of social media on political engagement and voter behavior during the 2021 campaign. The study examined approximately 85,000 posts from 756 candidate accounts of participating candidates across two major social media platforms, Facebook and Instagram, over a period spanning from 26 March to 9 April 2021, encompassing the initial two weeks of the campaign. The analysis identified stark contrasts in the social media strategies employed by the governing Socialist Party and the opposition, the Democratic Party and the Socialist Movement for Integration, revealing disparities in engagement methodologies and content distribution. Analysts questioned the credibility of the reported engagement metrics, suggesting potential manipulation through the misuse of public resources and coordinated actions, which undermines social media's reliability as an indicator of authentic voter sentiment.

On Facebook, the Socialist Party emerged as the dominant actor, accounting for 49% of all analysed posts and generating approximately 4.11 million interactions. In contrast, the Democratic Party recorded 3.45 million interactions, while the Socialist Movement for Integration garnered only 243,700. The Socialist's strategic deployment of video content was particularly impactful, with videos attracting 2.22 million views. On Instagram, PS candidates published 2,542 posts, yielding over 1.12 million interactions. Rama's digital influence was pronounced, amassing 1.5 million followers on Facebook, more than double the 629,000 followers of Basha, and far surpassing the 87,000 followers of Kryemadhi. Rama's posts generated 1.89 million interactions, while his videos accumulated over 22 million views, further underscoring his considerable influence across social media platforms.

=== Governing party ===
The inaugural rally of the Socialist Party at Skanderbeg Square in Tirana comprised a staging designed in the shape of the party's emblematic rose.

The Socialist Party (PS) initiated its electoral campaign on 25 March with a rally at Skanderbeg Square in Tirana. In attendance were Prime Minister Rama and the parliamentary candidates, each of whom presented their visions and objectives, thereby reinforcing their alignment with the Socialist Party's electoral agenda. In adherence to public health regulations necessitated by the pandemic, stringent social distancing protocols were implemented to ensure the safety of all candidates in attendance. On 10 February, Rama announced through social media that the party's program for the forthcoming parliamentary elections was nearing completion. He indicated that the program aimed to define a comprehensive vision for Albania by 2030, captured by the accompanying slogan "No time for rest!".

The campaign organised by the PS, presented through the "Rruga drejt 25 Prillit" series of online conferences, offered a comprehensive overview of critical socio-political issues while articulating the government's achievements and objectives. The series commenced on 3 March with "Drejtësia që duam," during which Rama asserted the paramount importance of the judicial reforms aimed at addressing systemic inefficiencies and reduce corruption within the judicial system. Subsequent to this, the 4 March conference, entitled "Shëndetësia që duam," examined the government's substantial measures in response to the COVID-19 pandemic, spotlighting fiscal allocations directed towards the healthcare sector, which included notable salary and working condition enhancements for healthcare personnel. On 5 March, during the session "Rindërtimi nuk ndalet," Rama delineated the extensive reconstruction efforts that have transpired since the 2019 earthquake. He underscored that all affected families had been provided with housing solutions, with the exception of a minor group entangled in property disputess, while receiving rental assistance. Rama positioned his government as having a commitment to building new, high-standard homes, schools, and public facilities. The conference held on 8 March, "Shqipëria e ardhmja, emigracioni e shkuara," explored the pressing issue of Albanian emigration, proposing a series of strategic interventions designed to mitigate this phenomenon through the promotion of enhanced economic opportunities and the fortification of social welfare programs.

Further discussions on 10 March in "Nisim sprintin drejt 25 Prillit" revealed the administration's commitment to fostering a conducive business environment. Rama pledged to maintain a zero percent profit tax for small enterprises, coupled with an increase in the minimum wage, thereby aiming to stimulate economic growth. On 15 March, the conference "Pagat, Taksa dhe Biznesi" continued this dialogue, emphasising the importance of fair wages and tax policies that support business development. Rama announced that the tax rate for small businesses employing up to 150,000 Albanians would remain at zero until 2029. The following day, 16 March, the focus shifted to education with the event "Shkolla dhe Universiteti." This conference advocated for a 40% increase in teacher salaries, the introduction of English language instruction in all schools starting from first grade, and the construction of new educational facilities, including a university campus. On 18 March, the discussions progressed to notable services in the "Uji dhe Energjia" conference, where the administration pledged to improve water and energy services, ensuring continuous access to potable water for all citizens. Rama outlined an objective to reduce energy losses from 21% to 10%, describing these improvements as essential for the economic growth and long-term development. The series culminated on 19 March with "Shërbimet për Qytetarët dhe Biznesin," which focused on the digitalisation of public services. This final conference detailed initiatives designed to improve administrative efficiency and elevate the overall quality of life for citizens.

=== Other parties ===
On 25 March, the Democratic Party – Alliance for Change launched its electoral campaign at 18:00 (CET) at Mother Teresa Square in Tirana under the slogan "Shqipëria fiton" that corresponds to "Albania wins". The event was marked by extensive motorcades of luxury vehicles and large gatherings of party supporters, during which social distancing and COVID-19 safety measures, as recommended by the Technical Committee of Experts, were not adhered to. Notably absent from this event was Sali Berisha, a significant figure in the party's history, marking the first time he was not present at an electoral campaign since its inception. During the rally, Basha addressed the crowd, emphasising his commitment to lead Albania into the European Union. He reminded attendees of the accomplishments achieved during the previous Democratic administration, such as NATO membership and the facilitation of free movement within Europe for Albanian citizens. The selected slogan echoed the 1996 campaign motto "Me ne fitojnë të gjithë" (With us, everyone wins), raised questions about the party's vision and creativity, suggesting a perceived lack of innovation in its political messaging. Throughout the electoral campaign, the party held several gatherings in Elbasan, Kavajë, Shijak, and Shkodër.

The Socialist Movement for Integration adopted a more localised strategy by not organising large-scale events, instead opting to continue with a series of community-based meetings. Kryemadhi opened the campaign on 25 March in Divjakë centered around the slogan "Shqipëria shtëpia juaj", which is interpreted to "Albania is your home". The campaign further expanded to other cities such as Fier, and Peqin before concluding on 22 April at Mother Teresa Square in Tirana. During her remarks, Kryemadhi underscored the party's vision for a nation that upholds its citizens, promotes non-discrimination in business, and ensures a dignified life for the youth. Topalli of the Movement for Change inaugurated the party's electoral campaign in Lezhë on 25 March with a public invitation to key political figures Rama, Basha, and Meta to participate in a public debate. She criticised the political establishment for monopolising power and dismissed the notion of meaningful change from figures like Basha, Meta, and Kryemadhi, accusing them of co-opting her party's slogan. Doshi of the Social Democratic Party launched their campaign on 26 March in Tirana under the slogan, "Na jepni besimin, t'ju kthjejmë shpresën", which translates to "Give us your trust, and we will restore your hope". Focused on anti-corruption and judicial reform, the party sought to rebuild public trust in the political system. Following its Tirana rally, the campaign extended to other cities, including Korçë, where it continued to emphasise its message of restoring hope and integrity within the government.

=== Issues ===
The 2021 electoral campaign was marked by several critical challenges, as observed by both the European Network of Election Monitoring Organizations (ENEMO) and Organization for Security and Co-operation in Europe (OSCE). Media coverage lacked analytical depth, with political messaging predominantly centered on the personalities of party leaders rather than on policy discussions. This focus on individual personas was accompanied by a confrontational tone, particularly from President Meta, whose rhetoric extended to social media platforms. The prevalence of hostile and offensive discourse, including derogatory comments targeting political opponents, violated established ethical standards. However, a positive development was the initiation of the "No Hate Alliance", which sought to promote tolerance and mitigate hate speech. The COVID-19 pandemic further complicated the campaign environment. Public health restrictions, including limits on gatherings and mandatory mask-wearing, impeded the ability of political parties to fully engage with voters. While these measures were necessary for public health, their inconsistent enforcement created discrepancies in compliance, with some rallies failing to adhere to distancing requirements. This inconsistency in enforcement was particularly evident in the unequal application of penalties, disproportionately affecting independent candidates and contributing to legal ambiguities, which further skewed the competitive landscape.

Both OSCE and ENEMO highlighted that, despite the broad respect for fundamental freedoms, the campaign was hampered by a lack of substantive policy discourse. Rather than articulating clear, actionable policy platforms, the focus of the major political parties was largely directed at personal attacks and allegations of corruption. The opposition coalition, led by the Democratic Party and the Socialist Movement for Integration, primarily criticised Rama, accusing the Socialist Party of corruption and misuse of state resources. The tone of the campaign was further exacerbated by Meta's open opposition to Rama, which amplified political polarisation. Accusations of organised crime affiliations and corruption, alongside the aggressive rhetoric, contributed to a pervasive atmosphere of distrust.

== Opinion polls ==
The opinion polls preceding the 2021 parliamentary elections indicated a competitive political landscape dominated by the Socialist Party (PS) and the Democratic Party (PD). During this period, the PS exhibited robust support, with percentages ranging from 39.9% to 59%, ultimately achieving a final vote share of 48.67%. In contrast, the PD's support fluctuated between 28% and 47.1%, reflecting challenges in consolidating voter backing, as evidenced by its final share of 39.43%. Smaller parties, such as the Socialist Movement for Integration (LSI) and PDIU, struggled to gain traction, consistently polling below 10%, with the LSI receiving 6.81% in the elections.

Polling firm	Date	Sample	PS	PD	LSI	PDIU	PSD	Others	Lead
2017 election	25 June	1,614,048	48.34%	28.85%	14.28%	4.81%	0.95%	2.77%	19.49%
Piepoli + Report TV	24 – 27 November 2020	500	53 – 59%	30 – 34%	2 – 4%	1 – 3%	–	5 – 7%	20%
MRB + Euronews Albania	22 December 2020 – 13 January 2021	1,600	41.8%	28.2%	10.3%	1.5%	–	2.1%	13.6%
Piepoli + Report TV	19 January – 22 January	900	48 – 52%	31 – 35%	4 – 8%	2 – 4%	–	1 – 9%	13%
MRB + Euronews Albania	25 January – 12 February	1,600	39.9%	30.6%	9.1%	1.6%	–	1.8%	9.3%
IPSOS + Top Channel	10 February – 16 February	1,527	49.5%	39.3%	5.1%	0.2%	0.8%	5%	12.2%
Piepoli + Report TV	18 February	800	47 – 51%	33 – 37%	4 – 8%	2 – 4%	–	2 – 12%	10%
NOTO Sondaggi + Ora News	23 February	2,000	41 – 45%	34 – 38%	8 – 12%	1 – 3%	–	7 – 11%	3%
GeoCartography + T7&GE	24 February – 8 March	3,778	45.25%	42.55%	8.8%	–	–	3.54%	2.7%
MRB + Euronews Albania	25 February – 9 March	1,600	41.3%	30.8%	7.6%	1.3%	–	1.1%	10.5%
IPSOS + Top Channel	3 March – 9 March	1,519	48.7%	40.6%	4.6%	–	0.9%	5.1%	8.1%
Piepoli + Report TV	17 March	1,000	47 – 51%	37 – 41%	4 – 8%	–	0 – 2%	1 – 10%	6%
NOTO Sondaggi + Ora News	12 March – 22 March	2,000	44.5 – 48.5%	41 – 45%	6 – 10%	–	0 – 2%	0 – 2%	1%
Piepoli + Report TV	23 March – 28 March	1,000	47 – 51%	38 – 42%	4 – 8%	–	0 – 2%	0 – 8%	5%
MRB + Euronews Albania	17 March – 31 March	2,500	43%	35.4%	5.2%	–	–	3.8%	7.6%
IPSOS + Top Channel	29 March – 31 March	1,513	48.4%	39.3%	5%	–	1.7%	5.5%	9.1%
NOTO Sondaggi + Ora News	6 April	2,000	44 – 48%	42 – 46%	6 – 10%	–	0 – 1%	0 – 3%	1%
Smith Research & Consulting	27 March – 9 April	1,000	42.5%	44.7%	11.3%	–	–	1.5%	2.2%
MRB + Euronews Albania	1 April – 15 April	2,700	43%	36.8%	5.8%	–	–	3%	6.2%
NOTO Sondaggi + Ora News	16 April – 19 April	2,000	43.5 – 47.5%	42.5 – 46.5%	4 – 7.5%	–	0 – 2%	1 – 5%	1%
Flame Tree Advisors + Syri TV	19 April	1,000	42.1%	47.1%	9.4%	–	–	1.3%	5%
IPSOS + Top Channel	18 April – 20 April	1,029	48.1%	43.6%	3.6%	–	0.8%	3.4%	4.5%
Smith Research & Consulting	23 April	1,000	42.4%	46.1%	10.4%	–	–	1.1%	3.7%
2021 election	25 April	1,578,117	48.67%	39.43%	6.81%	with PD	2.25%	2.84%	9.24%

== Results ==
The 2021 parliamentary elections took place on 25 April 2021 from 07:00 to 19:00 (CET) and recorded a total of 3,588,869 registered voters. Voter turnout was at 46.29%, with 1,661,176 ballots cast across 5,199 voting centres throughout Albania. The Socialist Party (PS) emerged as the predominant political force in the elections, securing 768,134 votes, which represented 48.67% of the total electorate, and successfully maintaining its representation with 74 seats in the parliament. The Democratic Party – Alliance for Change (PD – AN) demonstrated significant improvement in the elections, receiving 622,187 votes, equivalent to 39.43% of the electorate, a notable increase from its lows in both 2013 and 2017. This recovery was aided by the incorporation of several smaller parties, which strengthened its electoral coalition and overall representation to 59 seats in the parliament. The Socialist Movement for Integration (LSI) encountered a considerable decline, obtaining 107,538 votes, or 6.81%, and reducing its seat count to 4, reflecting a loss of 15 seats compared to the 2017 elections. Smaller parties also participated, with the Social Democratic Party (PSD) attracting 35,475 votes, representing 2.25%, and securing 3 seats. Nisma Thurje garnered 10,217 votes, amounting to 0.65%, yet failed to achieve parliamentary representation. A significant concern during the elections was the high number of invalid votes, totaling 83,059, which accounted for 5.00% of the total ballots cast. This issue was largely attributed to voter confusion with the new ballot design, which did not display the names of candidates for preferential votes, only their corresponding numbers.

The 2021 elections were marked by significant external influences from neighboring countries. The Vetëvendosje party from Kosovo attempted to shape the electoral outcome by fielding three candidates presented as independent, who aligned with its pro-unification agenda. Prime Minister Albin Kurti actively encouraged Albanian voters to support these candidates, with party members participating in campaign events across Albania. Furthermore, North Macedonia's Prime Minister Zoran Zaev endorsed the PS, urging the Albanian-Macedonian community to vote in its favor.

Party	Votes	%	Seats	+/–
Socialist Party	768,134	48.67	74	0
Democratic Party – Alliance for Change	622,187	39.43	59	+16
Socialist Movement for Integration	107,538	6.81	4	–15
Social Democratic Party	35,475	2.25	3	+2
Nisma Thurje	10,217	0.65	0	New
Democratic Conviction	8,239	0.52	0	New
Movement for Change	7,054	0.45	0	New
Albanian Democratic Movement Party	4,705	0.30	0	New
New Movement Party	3,767	0.24	0	New
New Democracy Alliance Party	3,232	0.20	0	New
Albanian National Front Party	1,946	0.12	0	New
National Hour Alliance – Emigration – People's Union and Conservatives	1,376	0.09	0	New
Independents	4,247	0.27	0	New
Total	1,578,117	100.00	140	0
Valid votes	1,578,117	95.00		
Invalid/blank votes	83,059	5.00		
Total votes	1,661,176	100.00		
Registered voters/turnout	3,588,869	46.29		
Source: KQZ and OSCE

=== Results by constituency ===
The 2021 parliamentary elections revealed varied results across the Albanian constituencies. The PS emerged as the dominant political force, securing 48.67% of the total electorate. It achieved significant victories among others in Berat with 55.97% and 5 seats, in Elbasan with 55.21% and 8 seats, and in Vlorë with 57.91% and 8 seats, demonstrating substantial endorsement in the southwestern and southern regions, while experiencing diminished endorsement in the northwestern and northeastern areas. The PD – AN received 39.43% of the electorate, aided by the incorporation of several smaller parties that strengthened its coalition. Notable results were recorded among others in Kukës, where it garnered 62.27% and 2 seats, and in Dibër, where it secured 45.13% and 3 seats. The LSI faced a marked decline, obtaining 6.81% of the total electorate and securing representation primarily in Fier, Shkodër and Tirana. The PSD garnered 2.25% of the vote, achieving representation in Shkodër and Tirana.

Constituency	PS			PD – AN			LSI			PSD			Seats
Constituency	%	Votes	Seats	%	Votes	Seats	%	Votes	Seats	%	Votes	Seats	Seats
Berat	55.97	42,337	5	30.44	23,029	2	11.12	8,409	–	0.50	377	–	7
Dibër	44.70	28,742	2	45.13	29,020	3	6.91	4,445	–	0.70	448	–	5
Durrës	50.26	76,898	8	41.44	63,393	6	6.20	9,479	–	0.43	654	–	14
Elbasan	55.21	86,224	8	37.06	57,878	6	4.42	6,895	–	0.38	594	–	14
Fier	52.77	91,572	9	37.27	64,680	6	7.10	12,312	1	0.46	795	–	16
Gjirokastër	53.83	24,531	3	30.66	13,971	1	12.68	5,778	–	1.16	529	–	4
Korçë	48.90	60,543	6	40.77	50,479	5	6.86	8,493	–	1.02	1,267	–	11
Kukës	35.84	13,856	1	62.27	24,071	2	0.17	64	–	0.47	183	–	3
Lezhë	38.03	27,269	3	47.42	33,998	4	10.34	7,416	–	0.44	319	–	7
Shkodër	28.11	30,296	3	43.80	47,205	5	9.37	10,100	1	15.24	16,425	2	11
Tirana	48.67	226,842	18	39.12	182,335	15	6.00	27,945	2	2.85	13,272	1	36
Vlorë	57.91	59,024	8	31.52	32,128	4	6.08	6,202	–	0.60	612	–	12
Total	48.67	768,134	74	39.43	622,187	59	6.81	107,538	4	2.25	35,475	3	140

== Aftermath ==
Subsequent to the announcement of the preliminary election results, Rama proclaimed his electoral triumph and convened with supporters of the Socialist Party (PS) at Skanderbeg Square in Tirana to commemorate his third consecutive term in office. He distinguished the results as "the most challenging, significant, and beautiful victory" in the annals of the PS. In his address, Rama articulated a profound sense of pride in the Albanian people, acknowledging their resilience and determination during this critical moment in Albania's history. Conversely, Basha of the Democratic Party – Alliance for Change (PD – AN) contested the preliminary results, alleging that the PS engaged in extensive electoral manipulation, including vote buying and the invalidation of thousands of ballots. He denounced the electoral process as an "electoral massacre", asserting that the PD faced not merely a political opponent but a regime intent on undermining democratic principles. President Meta emphasised the significance of 25 April as a peaceful and orderly electoral day, affirming that this achievement contributes to the democratic stability of Albania. In a video message, he called for moderation among political parties, urging them to facilitate a serene conclusion to the process and underlined the importance of collaboration among political entities to foster a stable and constructive political environment.

Kryemadhi of the Socialist Movement for Integration attributed the electoral disappointment to strategic missteps, particularly the prior boycott of local elections and the relinquishment of parliamentary seats. Amid these developments, Doshi of the Social Democratic Party submitted his resignation through a formal letter to the KQZ. He expressed his intent to resign from his parliamentary mandate, withdraw from the proportional representation candidate list, and request his replacement. Doshi stated that his decision stemmed from a commitment to safeguarding his reputation against recent unfounded allegations. He reaffirmed his dedication to the leadership of the party and his unwavering commitment to fulfilling the promises made to his constituents. Endri Shabani of Nisma Thurje conveyed gratitude and apologies to their supporters, recognising the significant effort made by citizens who contributed their time and resources to the campaign.

=== International reception ===
The electoral triumph of Rama and the PS generated several responses from international dignitaries:

- Austria – Chancellor Sebastian Kurz extended his congratulations to Rama, confirming Austria's commitment to enhancing relations, tackling the COVID-19 pandemic in partnership, and advancing Albania's journey toward European Union (EU) membership.
- Greece – Prime Minister Kyriakos Mitsotakis delivered his felicitations to Rama, describing his triumph as a "beautiful victory".
- Kosovo – President Vjosa Osmani commended the PS for its electoral success, emphasising the imperative for all political leaders to actively contribute to the strengthening of democratic institutions, the rule of law, and the promotion of collaborative relations with Kosovo. On a similar note, Prime Minister Kurti highlighted the interdependence between Kosovo and Albania and advocated for enhanced cooperation across all sectors to improve standards of democracy and economic development.
- North Macedonia – Prime Minister Zoran Zaev conveyed his accolades to Rama, disclosing optimism about the future of North Macedonia and Albania as NATO allies and emphasising their commitment to European integration through intensified cooperation. On a related note, Ali Ahmeti, leader of the Democratic Union for Integration, praised Rama's achievement, vowing to support him and the Albanian community in their shared journey toward a united Europe.
- Serbia – Shaip Kamberi, leader of the Party for Democratic Action, granted his congratulations to Rama, commending the maturity and calmness demonstrated by the Albanian people throughout the process and underscored the necessity for sustained support for the Preševo Valley. Kamberi asserted that the region would endure marginalisation without the proactive engagement of both Albania and Kosovo.
- Turkey – President Recep Tayyip Erdoğan afforded his compliments to Rama, signifying the importance of this achievement in reinforcing the relations between Turkey and Albania.
- United States – Department of State spokesperson Ned Price communicated their congratulations to the Albanian people on the elections, reaffirming the US commitment to ongoing collaboration with Rama and recognising the commendable efforts of the opposition. Ambassador Yuri Kim further marked the necessity of responsible governance that advances the interests of the Albanian people and strengthens cooperation in democratic development.

=== Government formation ===
On 10 September 2021, the government of Prime Minister Edi Rama received a vote of confidence in the parliament. Subsequently, on 14 September, the President Ilir Meta decreed the government after all ministers were confirmed by the national anti-corruption agency, Special Structure against Corruption and Organized Crime (SPAK). On 18 September at 10:00 (CET), Rama's third cabinet was sworn in during a formal ceremony presided over by President at Presidenca. Following the oath-taking, Rama convened an inaugural session with the newly appointed ministers, comprising 12 women and 5 men, marking their first summit as the Këshilli i Ministrave at Kryeministria. The cabinet received parliamentary approval with 77 votes in favor, amid ongoing discussions regarding President Meta's recent dismissal, which awaited a ruling from the Constitutional Court. The administration's agenda emphasised earthquake reconstruction, effective pandemic management, enhancement of welfare, and initiatives aimed at economic modernisation and the fortification of the rule of law.

== See also ==
- Elections in Albania
- 2022 Albanian presidential election
