= Environmentalist Agrarian Party =

Political party in Albania

Environmentalist Agrarian Party Partia Agrare Ambientaliste
- Leader: Agron Duka
- Founded: 1991
- Headquarters: Tirana
- Ideology: Agrarianism
- Political position: Centre
- National affiliation: Alliance for a Magnificent Albania
- Colours: Green
- Parliament: 1 / 140
- Municipalities: 0 / 61
- Council Seats: 52 / 1,613

Website
- paa.com.al

The Environmentalist Agrarian Party (Albanian: Partia Agrare Ambientaliste) is an Albanian political party founded in 1991. The party was founded by Lufter Xhuveli. Initially, the party was known as the Agrarian Party of Albania (Partia Agrare e Shqipërisë), until a name change took place in 2003. It is a reformist party that supports a free market economic system.

== History ==
In the 1997 elections, the party won one of the single-member constituency seats, but none of the proportional seats. In total the party got 0.65%. In the 2001 elections, it received 2.6% of the vote and three seats in Parliament, Lufter Xhuveli from Zone 125, Ndue Preka from Zone 126 and Refat Dervina from Zone 127.

In the 2003 local elections, the first contested under the new name PAA, the party contested in alliance with the Socialist Party of Albania (PSSH) in some areas. The PAA-PSSH combine won in three municipalities.

In the 2005 parliamentary elections, the party received 88,605 votes (6.5%) and 4 seats.

In 1998 Xhuveli became Minister of Agriculture. Under the Majko government he was made Minister for the Environment in February 2002. In 2003 he was replaced during the reforms of Prime Minister Fatos Nano.

On 2016 Xhuveli resigned. The current leader of the party is Agron Duka, a former member and MP of the Republican Party of Albania.

== Election results ==
Election	Votes (%)	Seats	Position	Governmental
1991	0.07%	0 / 140	0	Opposition
1992	Did not participate			
1996	Did not participate			
1997	0.65%	1 / 155	▲1	Coalition
2001	2.6%	3 / 140	▲2	Coalition
2005	6.5%	4 / 140	▲1	Coalition
2009	0.9%	0 / 140	▼4	Coalition
2013	0.15%	0 / 140	0	Opposition
2017	Did not participate			
2021	Part of PD-AN (Note: Alliance led by PD. The other members are PDIU, PR, LZHK, PDK, FRD, PBKD, PBDNJ, BLD, PBD, PLL, PKD.)	1 / 140	▲1	Opposition
2025	Part of ASHM	1 / 140	0	Opposition
