= 2015 Albanian local elections =

2015 Albanian Local Elections
- 21 June 2015
- Turnout: 47.83% (▼3.07 pp)

Local elections were held in Albania on 21 June 2015. Voters elected mayors, municipal council members, municipal unit mayors and municipal unit members. The Central Election Commission of Albania was responsible for administrating the elections. This provided that the community type of komuna was abolished and at the same time the total number of communities was reduced from 373 to 61 Bashkia. Those entitled to vote elected the executive and legislative representatives of their communities, the 61 mayors (and on the other hand the total of 1595 municipal councils.

== Background ==
Following the elections in 2011. The Democrats won in many rural areas as well as Tirana by 81 votes. At the time, Edi Rama was the longest Serving Mayor of Tirana serving 11 years. Lulzim Basha in 2015 announced he would not seek reelection for mayor of Tirana. Prior to the election, Lulzim Basha announced that Halim Kosova would be elected to run as Mayor of Tirana for the Democratic Party of Albania. Minister of Social Welfare and Youth at the time, Erion Veliaj, had announced he would run to become Mayor of Tirana.

== Parties and Coalitions ==
Following Sali Berisha's Resignation after the election loss in 2013. Lulzim Basha was elected leader of the Democratic Party of Albania. Basha would become the leader of the opposition up until 2021 when Berisha and Basha began disputing over the party leadership. Basha would announce in 2015 that he would not seek a second term as mayor of Tirana. There would be two alliances as usual in previous elections Local and Parliamentary. The Alliance for a European Albania (ASHE) led by Prime Minister Edi Rama and the People's Alliance for Work and Dignity (APPD) led by Opposition leader Lulzim Basha.

Party	Coalition
Socialist Party of Albania	Alliance for a European Albania
Socialist Movement for Integration	Alliance for a European Albania
Party for Justice, Integration and Unity	Alliance for a European Albania
Aleanca Arbnore Kombëtare	Alliance for a European Albania
Democratic Alliance	Alliance for a European Albania
Macedonian Alliance for European Integration	Alliance for a European Albania
Alliance for Equality and European Justice	Alliance for a European Albania
Alliance for Democracy and Solidarity	Alliance for a European Albania
Albanian Future party	Alliance for a European Albania
Party of the New European Democracy	Alliance for a European Albania
Albanian Questions Party	Alliance for a European Albania
Albanian Muslim Association Democratic Party	Alliance for a European Albania
Green Party of Albania	Alliance for a European Albania
Albanian Christian Democratic Alliance	Alliance for a European Albania
Albanian Workers Movement Party	Alliance for a European Albania
Party of Democratic Reforms of Albania	Alliance for a European Albania
Party to the Denied Rights	Alliance for a European Albania
Party Power of Youth	Alliance for a European Albania
National Unity Party	Alliance for a European Albania
G99	Alliance for a European Albania
Communist Party of Albania	Alliance for a European Albania
Communist Party of Albania 8 November	Alliance for a European Albania
Democratic Movement for Change	Alliance for a European Albania
Albanian Justice Movement	Alliance for a European Albania
Law and Justice Party	Alliance for a European Albania
Party for the Europeanization and Integration of Albania	Alliance for a European Albania
Party for the Defence of the Rights of the Emigrants	Alliance for a European Albania
Party for People with Disabilities	Alliance for a European Albania
Party Path of Freedom	Alliance for a European Albania
Albanian Homeland Party	Alliance for a European Albania
Moderate Socialist Party	Alliance for a European Albania
Real Socialist Party '91	Alliance for a European Albania
Albanian Social Workers Party	Alliance for a European Albania
New Democratic Spirit	Alliance for a European Albania
Social Democracy Party	Alliance for a European Albania
Demochristian Party of Albania	Alliance for a European Albania
Albanian National Reconciliation Party	Alliance for a European Albania
Ethnic Greek Minority for the future	–
Left Front Party	–
Party for the Protection of Labor Rights of Albania	–
Christian Democratic Party of Albania	–
Democratic Movement for Values, Welfare and Progress	–
Unity for Human Rights Party	–
People's Alliance	–
Social Democratic Party of Albania	–
National Alliance Party	–
National Democratic Albanian Alliance	–
European Ecological Association	–
Democratic Party of Albania	People's Alliance for Work and Dignity
Republican Party of Albania	People's Alliance for Work and Dignity
Environmentalist Agrarian Party	People's Alliance for Work and Dignity
Legality Movement Party	People's Alliance for Work and Dignity
Albanian National Front Party	People's Alliance for Work and Dignity
Liberal Democratic Union	People's Alliance for Work and Dignity
Movement for National Development	People's Alliance for Work and Dignity
Democratic National Front Party	People's Alliance for Work and Dignity
Party Time of Albania	People's Alliance for Work and Dignity
Albanian Conservative Party	People's Alliance for Work and Dignity
Christian Democratic People's Party of Albania	People's Alliance for Work and Dignity
Albanian Christian Democratic League	People's Alliance for Work and Dignity
Liberal Right Party	People's Alliance for Work and Dignity

== Results ==
The Alliance for a European Albania would win without any trouble in most areas in Albania. Winning Tirana by large Margin and Erion Veliaj officially becoming Mayor of Tirana. This would be Lulzim Basha's first time being the leader of the opposition of Albania other than Sali Berisha. Basha's People's Alliance for Work and Dignity was only able to win 13/61 municipalities. It was considered a humiliating loss for the Democratic Party of Albania and its alliance. ASHE won 45 municipalities, including the larger cities, especially in the south of the country, such as Durrës, Elbasan, Vlora, Korça, Gjirokastra, Fier and Sarande. In non-coalition parties, the Ethnic Greek Minority for the future (MEGA) in Finiq the choice. ASHE was seen as the winner of the local elections. The mayors who won as well votes are as shown below:

County	City	Mayor	Party	Alliance
Berat	Berat	Petrit Sinaj	Socialist Movement for Integration	ASHE
Berat	Kuçova	Selfo Kapllani	Socialist Movement for Integration	ASHE
Berat	Poliçan	Adriatik Zotkaj	Socialist Party of Albania	ASHE
Berat	Skrapar	Nesim Spahiu	Socialist Movement for Integration	ASHE
Berat	Ura Vajgurore	Juliana Memaj	Socialist Party of Albania	ASHE
Dibër	Bulqizë	Melaim Damzi	Socialist Movement for Integration	ASHE
Dibër	Dibër	Shukri Xhelili	Socialist Party of Albania	ASHE
Dibër	Klos	Basir Çupa	Democratic Party of Albania	APPD
Dibër	Mat	Nezir Rizvani	Democratic Party of Albania	APPD
Durrës	Durrës	Vangjush Dako	Socialist Party of Albania	ASHE
Durrës	Krujë	Artur Bushi	Socialist Party of Albania	ASHE
Durrës	Shijak	Ardian Kokomani	Socialist Party of Albania	ASHE
Elbasan	Belsh	Arif Tafani	Socialist Party of Albania	ASHE
Elbasan	Cërrik	Altin Toska	Socialist Movement for Integration	ASHE
Elbasan	Elbasan	Qazim Sejdini	Socialist Party of Albania	ASHE
Elbasan	Gramsh	Luljeta Dollani	Socialist Party of Albania	ASHE
Elbasan	Librazhd	Kastriot Gurra	Socialist Party of Albania	ASHE
Elbasan	Peqin	Saimir Hasalla	Party for Justice, Integration and Unity	ASHE
Elbasan	Përrenjas	Miranda Rira	Socialist Movement for Integration	ASHE
Fier	Divjakë	Fredi Kokoneshi	Socialist Party of Albania	ASHE
Fier	Fier	Armando Subashi	Socialist Party of Albania	ASHE
Fier	Lushnjë	Fatos Tushe	Socialist Party of Albania	ASHE
Fier	Mallakastër	Agron Kapllanaj	Democratic Party of Albania	APPD
Fier	Patos	Rajmonda Balilaj	Socialist Party of Albania	ASHE
Fier	Roskovec	Majlinda Bufi	Socialist Party of Albania	ASHE
Gjirokastër	Dropull	Ahilea Deçka	Democratic Party of Albania	APPD
Gjirokastër	Gjirokastër	Zamira Rami	Socialist Movement for Integration	ASHE
Gjirokastër	Këlcyra	Klement Ndoni	Socialist Party of Albania	ASHE
Gjirokastër	Libohovë	Luiza Mandi	Socialist Party of Albania	ASHE
Gjirokastër	Memaliaj	Durim Roshi	Socialist Party of Albania	ASHE
Gjirokastër	Përmet	Niko Shupuli	Democratic Party of Albania	APPD
Gjirokastër	Tepelena	Tërmet Peçi	Socialist Party of Albania	ASHE
Korçë	Devoll	Bledjon Nallbati	Democratic Party of Albania	APPD
Korçë	Kolonja	Arben Malo	Socialist Movement for Integration	ASHE
Korçë	Korça	Sotiraq Filo	Socialist Party of Albania	ASHE
Korçë	Maliq	Gëzim Topçiu	Socialist Party of Albania	ASHE
Korçë	Pogradec	Eduart Kapri	Democratic Party of Albania	APPD
Korçë	Pustec	Edmond Themelko	Macedonian Alliance for European Integration	ASHE
Kukës	Has	Adem Lala	Socialist Party of Albania	ASHE
Kukës	Kukës	Bashkim Shehu	Democratic Party of Albania	APPD
Kukës	Tropojë	Besnik Dushaj	Democratic Party of Albania	APPD
Lezhë	Kurbin	Artur Bardhi	Socialist Party of Albania	ASHE
Lezhë	Lezhë	Fran Frrokaj	Democratic Party of Albania	APPD
Lezhë	Mirditë	Ndrec Dedaj	Socialist Party of Albania	ASHE
Shkodër	Fushë-Arrëz	Fran Tuci	Socialist Party of Albania	ASHE
Shkodër	Malësia e Madhe	Tonin Marinaj	Socialist Party of Albania	ASHE
Shkodër	Pukë	Gjon Gjonaj	Socialist Party of Albania	ASHE
Shkodër	Shkodër	Voltana Ademi	Democratic Party of Albania	APPD
Shkodër	Vau i Dejës	Zef Hila	Democratic Party of Albania	APPD
Tirana	Kamëz	Xhelal Mziu	Democratic Party of Albania	APPD
Tirana	Kavajë	Elvis Roshi	Socialist Party of Albania	ASHE
Tirana	Rrogozhinë	Beqir Nuredini	Party for Justice, Integration and Unity	ASHE
Tirana	Tirana	Erion Veliaj	Socialist Party of Albania	ASHE
Tirana	Vorë	Fiqiri Ismaili	Democratic Party of Albania	APPD
Vlorë	Delvinë	Rigels Balili	Socialist Movement for Integration	ASHE
Vlorë	Finiq	Leonidha Hristo	Ethnic Greek Minority for the future	–
Vlorë	Himarë	Jorgo Goro	Socialist Party of Albania	ASHE
Vlorë	Konispol	Shuaip Beqiri	Socialist Party of Albania	ASHE
Vlorë	Sarandë	Florjana Koka	Socialist Party of Albania	ASHE
Vlorë	Selenicë	Përparim Shametaj	Democratic Party of Albania	APPD
Vlorë	Vlorë	Dritan Leli	Socialist Party of Albania	ASHE
Source: CEC

Total Votes
Alliance	Leader	Votes	Percentage of Votes
Alliance for a European Albania (ASHE)	Edi Rama	991,609	63,48%
People's Alliance for Work and Dignity (APPD)	Lulzim Basha	507,285	32,47%
Social Democratic Party of Albania	Skënder Gjinushi	22,320	1,43%
Unity for Human Rights Party	Vangjel Dule	14,771	0,95%
Christian Democratic Party of Albania	Dhimiter Muslia	9,424	0,60%
Ethnic Greek Minority for the future	Leonidha Hristo	3,144	0,20%
Democratic Movement for Values, Welfare and Progress	Arben Tafaj	1,942	0,12%
European Ecological Alliance	Sazan Guri	1.938	0,12%
People's Alliance	Fatjon Softa	1,712	0,11%
Left Front Party	Marko Dajti	717	0,05

== Council seat election results ==
ASHE alliance held the majority in many Municipal councils as shown:

County	City	Council Seats	APPD (Democratic Party)	Seats ASHE (Socialist Party/Socialist Movement for Integration)	Seats of other parties and independent candidates	Party with the highest percentage of votes
Berat	Berat	31	10 (6)	21 (11/7)	0	Socialist Party of Albania
Berat	Kuçova	31	8 (6)	23 (10/6)	0	Socialist Party of Albania
Berat	Poliçan	15	2 (2)	13 (8/3)	0	Socialist Party of Albania
Berat	Skrapar	15	2 (1)	13 (3/10)	0	Socialist Movement for Integration
Berat	Ura Vajgurore	21	6 (4)	15 (6/5)	0	Socialist Party of Albania
Dibër	Bulqizë	21	8 (2)	13 (3/2)	0	Socialist Party of Albania
Dibër	Dibër	31	13 (8)	17 (8/3)	1	Democratic Party of Albania
Dibër	Klos	21	9 (2)	12 (2/3)	0	Socialist Movement for Integration
Dibër	Mat	21	9 (3)	12 (3/3)	0	Socialist Party of Albania
Durrës	Durrës	51	16 (14)	35 (16/13)	0	Socialist Party of Albania
Durrës	Krujë	31	12 (5)	19 (5/6)	0	Democratic Party of Albania
Durrës	Shijak	21	9 (6)	12 (7/2)	0	Socialist Party of Albania
Elbasan	Belsh	21	8 (2)	13 (5/4)	0	Socialist Party of Albania
Elbasan	Cërrik	21	7 (4)	14 (5/4)	0	Socialist Party of Albania
Elbasan	Elbasan	51	16 (13)	35 (16/10)	0	Socialist Party of Albania
Elbasan	Gramsh	21	5 (1)	16 (2/2)	0	Socialist Party of Albania
Elbasan	Librazhd	21	4 (2)	17 (5/2)	0	Socialist Party of Albania
Elbasan	Peqin	21	5 (3)	15 (2/4)	1	Party for Justice, Integration and Unity
Elbasan	Përrenjas	21	6 (2)	15 (4/2)	0	Socialist Party of Albania
Fier	Divjakë	31	10 (6)	21 (9/6)	0	Socialist Party of Albania
Fier	Fier	41	12 (8)	29 (16/9)	0	Socialist Party of Albania
Fier	Lushnjë	41	12 (10)	29 (14/9)	0	Socialist Party of Albania
Fier	Mallakastër	21	7 (2)	14 (4/3)	0	Socialist Party of Albania
Fier	Patos	21	4 (3)	17 (8/5)	0	Socialist Party of Albania
Fier	Roskovec	21	7 (3)	14 (9/3)	0	Socialist Party of Albania
Gjirokastër	Dropull	21	3 (3)	14 (3/10)	4	Socialist Movement for Integration
Gjirokastër	Gjirokastër	31	10 (8)	21 (9/7)	0	Socialist Party of Albania
Gjirokastër	Këlcyra	15	4 (1)	11 (1/3)	0	Socialist Movement for Integration
Gjirokastër	Libohovë	15	6 (4)	9 (5/3)	0	Socialist Party of Albania
Gjirokastër	Memaliaj	21	4 (2)	16 (5/7)	1	Socialist Movement for Integration
Gjirokastër	Përmet	20	5 (1)	15 (2/4)	0	Socialist Movement for Integration
Gjirokastër	Tepelena	15	4 (2)	11 (5/4)	0	Socialist Party of Albania
Korçë	Devoll	21	6 (4)	15 (4/4)	0	Democratic Party of Albania
Korçë	Kolonja	15	4 (4)	11 (5/3)	0	Socialist Party of Albania
Korçë	Korça	41	12 (11)	29 (17/8)	0	Socialist Party of Albania
Korçë	Maliq	31	10 (6)	21 (9/6)	0	Socialist Party of Albania
Korçë	Pogradec	31	10 (5)	21 (7/5)	0	Socialist Party of Albania
Korçë	Pustec	15	3 (1)	12 (2/2)	0	Macedonian Alliance for European Integration
Kukës	Has	21	9 (2)	12 (1/1)	0	Democratic Party of Albania
Kukës	Kukës	31	13 (4)	17 (2/2)	1	Democratic Party of Albania
Kukës	Tropojë	21	9 (4)	12 (2/2)	0	Democratic Party of Albania
Lezhë	Kurbin	31	6 (3)	25 (7/7)	0	Socialist Party of Albania
Lezhë	Lezhë	41	18 (7)	22 (5/4)	1	Democratic Party of Albania
Lezhë	Mirditë	21	4 (2)	15 (2/2)	2	Socialist Movement for Integration
Shkodër	Fushë-Arrëz	15	5 (1)	10 (1/2)	0	Socialist Movement for Integration
Shkodër	Malësia e Madhe	31	12 (3)	17 (5/5)	2	Socialist Movement for Integration
Shkodër	Pukë	15	3 (1)	11 (1/3)	1	Socialist Movement for Integration
Shkodër	Shkodër	51	27 (21)	24 (9/10)	0	Democratic Party of Albania
Shkodër	Vau i Dejës	21	11 (7)	10 (3/2)	0	Democratic Party of Albania
Tirana	Kamëz	41	19 (12)	22 (8/9)	0	Democratic Party of Albania
Tirana	Kavajë	31	11 (9)	20 (10/5)	0	Socialist Party of Albania
Tirana	Rrogozhinë	21	6 (4)	15 (5/5)	0	Socialist Party of Albania
Tirana	Tirana	61	19 (17)	42 (25/13)	0	Socialist Party of Albania
Tirana	Vorë	21	10 (7)	11 (3/6)	0	Democratic Party of Albania
Vlorë	Delvinë	15	4 (2)	11 (3/4)	0	Socialist Movement for Integration
Vlorë	Finiq	21	1 (1)	8 (5/2)	12	Ethnic Greek Minority for the future
Vlorë	Himarë	21	3 (2)	14 (8/4)	4	Socialist Party of Albania
Vlorë	Konispol	15	5 (2)	9 (4/2)	1	Socialist Party of Albania
Vlorë	Sarandë	31	9 (4)	20 (8/4)	2	Socialist Party of Albania
Vlorë	Selenicë	21	8 (4)	13 (5/2)	0	Socialist Party of Albania
Vlorë	Vlorë	41	12 (9)	29 (18/5)	0	Socialist Party of Albania
