= List of political parties in Albania =

Albania has a multi-party system with two major political parties, the Socialist Party and Democratic Party, and few smaller ones that are electorally successful. According to official data from the Central Election Commission, there were a total of 124 political parties listed in the party registry for the year 2014. Only 54 of these parties participated in the 2015 local elections.

== Parties represented in the Parliament of Albania ==
This is a list of political parties with representation in the Albanian parliament following the general parliamentary elections of 2025.

Logo	Name	Abbr.	Leader	Ideology	Kuvendi	Political position	European
	Socialist Party of Albania; Partia Socialiste e Shqipërisë	PS	Edi Rama	Social democracy; Pro-Europeanism	83 / 140	Centre-left	PES (associate)
	Democratic Party of Albania–Alliance for a Magnificent Albania; Partia Demokratike e Shqipërisë–Aleanca për Shqipërinë Madhështore	PD–ASHM	Sali Berisha	Conservatism; Pro-Europeanism	50 / 140	Centre-right	EPP (associate)
	Social Democratic Party of Albania; Partia Socialdemokrate e Shqipërisë	PSD	Tom Doshi	Social democracy; Pro-Europeanism	3 / 140	Centre-left	—N/a
	Opportunity Party; Partia Mundësia	MUNDËSIA	Agron Shehaj	Economic liberalism; Pro-Europeanism	2 / 140	Centre-right	—N/a
	Albania Becomes Movement; Lëvizja Shqipëria Bëhet	SHB	Adriatik Lapaj	Direct democracy; Civic nationalism	1 / 140	Centre	—N/a
	Together Movement; Lëvizja Bashkë	BASHKË	Arlind Qori	Progressivism; Left-wing populism	1 / 140	Left-wing	—N/a

== Political parties in Albania (1921–present) ==
This is a list of noted political parties that have participated in Albania's elections from 1921 to present day.

Abbr.	Name	Founded	Registered	Leader
PFSH	Albanian Fascist Party	2 June 1939		Dissolved
PPSH	Labour Party of Albania; Predecessor of the Socialist Party of Albania	8 November 1941		Dissolved
FDSH	Democratic Front of Albania	16 September 1942		Dissolved
PSD	Social Democratic Party of Albania	1943	1946	Dissolved
KKVLAPSH	National Veteran's Committee	20 July 1957		Rustem Peçi
PDSH	Democratic Party of Albania	12 December 1990	19 December 1990	Sali Berisha
OMONIA	Democratic Union of the Greek Minority	11 January 1991		
PAA	Environmentalist Agrarian Party; Formerly the Agrarian Party; renamed on 21 July 2003		9 February 1991	Agron Duka
PBDNJ	Unity for Human Rights Party		24 February 1991	Vangjel Dule
PUKSH	National Unity Party		15 March 1991	Idajet Beqiri
PSDSH	Social Democratic Party of Albania		23 April 1991	Tom Doshi
PSSH	Socialist Party of Albania	13 June 1991	15 August 1991	Edi Rama
PBSH	Green Party of Albania		2 October 1991	Edlir Petanaj
PBK	National Front Party; Formerly the Democratic Union of Albania; renamed on 3 April 1993		4 October 1991	Adriatik Alimadhi
PRSH	Republican Party of Albania	10 January 1991	10 October 1991	Fatmir Mediu
PDKSH	Demochristian Party of Albania; Formerly the Popular Union of Albania; renamed on 11 December 1991		10 October 1991	Nard Ndoka
PLL	Legality Movement Party		20 February 1992	Sulejman Gjana
BDSH	Democratic Union Party		3 April 1992	Ylber Valteri
BLD	Liberal Democratic Union; Formerly the Social Democratic Union; renamed on 13 April 2005		24 January 1995	Arian Starova
———	National Revival Party		28 February 1996	Abdi Baleta
PKSH	Communist Party		9 July 1998	Qemal Cicollari
ADK	Demochristian Alliance of Albania; Formerly the Social Christian Party; renamed on 25 February 2011		18 July 2000	Zef Bushati
PLMDSH	Democratic Monarchist Movement Party		7 March 2001	Guri Durollari
PDR	New Democratic Party; Formerly the Democrat Party; renamed on 11 April 2003		16 March 2001	Genc Pollo
PKD	Christian Democratic Party; Formerly the Christian Democratic Party of Albania; renamed on 29 March 2013		17 May 2002	Mirela Ferracaku
LZHK	Movement for National Development; Formerly the Democratic Renewal Party; renamed on 16 June 2008		17 July 2002	Dashamir Shehi
PDS	Social Democracy Party		7 May 2003	Paskal Milo
PL	Freedom Party of Albania; Formerly the Socialist Movement for Integration; renamed on 25 July 2022		6 September 2004	Ilir Meta
LDLNJ	Movement for Freedom and Human Rights		5 January 2005	Ligoraq Karamelo
AMS	List for Natural Albania; Formerly the Alliance for Welfare and Solidarity; renamed on 26 April 2011		15 February 2005	Koço Danaj
———	Road to Freedom Party		3 March 2005	Kurt Kola
LBSH	Albanian Green League		21 March 2005	Brixhida Kokëdhima
AMIE	Macedonian Alliance for European Integration		8 June 2005	Edmond Themelko
PVSH	Party of the Vlachs of Albania; Formerly the Alliance for Equality and European Justice	28 October 2011	17 February 2012	Edmond Petraj
———	Left Front Party; Formerly the Reorganized People's Party; renamed on 14 July 2014		4 July 2007	Marko Dajti
LDK	Christian Democratic Union		27 November 2007	Nikoll Lesi
PLiDr	Law and Justice Party		17 February 2009	Spartak Ngjela
PSV91	True Socialist Party 91		26 February 2009	Petro Koçi
ADS	Alliance for Democracy and Solidarity		3 March 2009	Gaqo Apostoli
G99	G99		7 April 2009	Ervin Mete
LDE	Law, Democracy and Ethics Party		25 March 2010	Arjan Galdini
MEGA	Ethnic Greek Minority for the Future		21 June 2010	Kristo Kiço
AEE	European Ecological Alliance		7 December 2010	Sazan Guri
PDIU	Party for Justice, Integration and Unity		1 March 2011	Shpëtim Idrizi
OP	Organizata Politike	2011		Shared leadership
AKZ	Red and Black Alliance		21 March 2012	Lumturi Ratkoceri
FRD	New Democratic Spirit		20 June 2012	Gazment Oketa
NTH	Hashtag Initiative	12 December 2013		Pano Soko
SFIDA	Challenge for Albania	11 June 2016		Hektor Ruci
LIBRA	Equal List	1 November 2016		Gjergj Prifti
BD	Democratic Conviction		23 April 2019	Astrit Patozi
BASHKË	Lëvizja Bashkë	18 December 2022	21 March 2023	Arlind Qori
LSHB	Lëvizja Shqipëria Bëhet	18 September 2023	15 October 2024	Adriatik Lapaj
PM	Opportunity Party	1 June 2024		Agron Shehaj
KEA	Euroatlantic Coalition	14 June 2024	3 March 2025	Endri Hasa
DJATHTAS	Right 1912	12 October 2024		Enkelejd Alibeaj
AKPSH	Conservative Alliance for Albania	19 January 2025		Altin Goxhaj

== See also ==
- Politics of Albania
- List of political parties by country
