= 2009 Albanian parliamentary election =

- 28 June 2009
- All 140 seats in the Parliament of Albania; 71 seats needed for a majority
- Turnout: 50.77% (▲1.70pp)
Party	Leader	Vote %	Seats	+/–
Alliance for Change (70 seats)
PD	Sali Berisha	40.18	68	+12
PR	Fatmir Mediu	2.11	1	−10
PDI	Tahir Muhedini	0.95	1	+1
Unification for Change (66 seats)
PS	Edi Rama	40.85	65	+23
PBDNJ	Vangjel Dule	1.19	1	−1
Socialist Alliance for Integration (4 seats)
LSI	Ilir Meta	4.85	4	−1
This lists parties that won seats. See the complete results below.

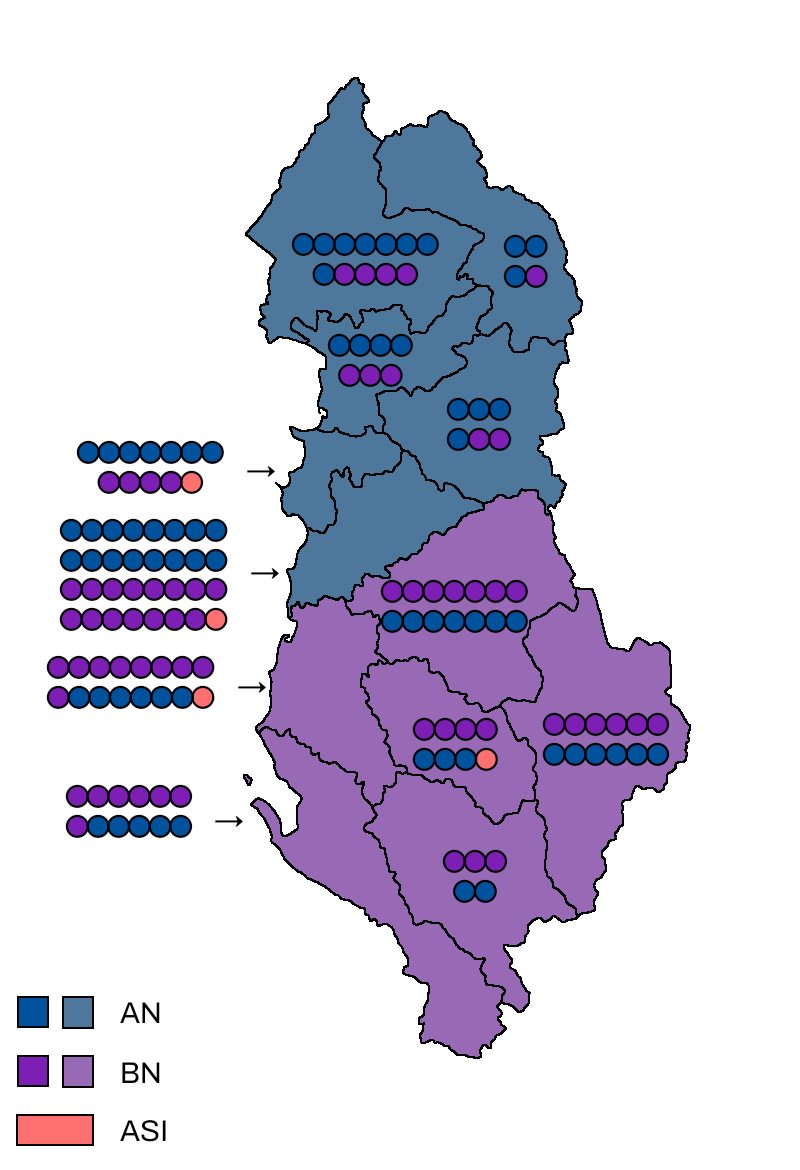
Prime Minister before	Prime Minister after
Sali Berisha; PD	Sali Berisha; PD

Parliamentary elections were held in Albania on 28 June 2009. No alliance achieved 71 deputies on its own needed to form a parliamentary majority. A coalition government was formed by the Democratic Party and Socialist Movement for Integration.

== Electoral System ==
The 140 members of Parliament were elected in twelve multi-member constituencies analogous to the country's twelve counties. Within the constituencies, seats are elected by closed list proportional representation, with an electoral threshold of 3% for parties and 5% for alliances.

Seats are allocated to alliances using the d'Hondt system, then to political parties using the Sainte-Laguë method.

== Background ==
Prior to the election, the electoral law was changed to a regional and proportional system. Polls from March and April 2009 saw a very close race, with both the governing Democratic Party of Albania and the opposition Socialist Party of Albania around 37%, with minor parties like the Socialist Movement for Integration, the G99 Movement, the Unity for Human Rights Party and the Republican Party of Albania in the low single digits.

Shortly before the election, the ethnic Greek Unity for Human Rights Party switched their allegiance, abandoning their alliance with the Democratic Party of Albania to join the Socialist Party of Albania. The Party for Justice and Integration, a party representing the interest of ethnic Albanians whose properties in Greece were seized after WW2, joined the coalition Alliance of Change.

== Alliances ==
This election saw a total of 33 parties organized in four alliances, one party running on its own and one independent candidate.

- Alliance of Change (Aleanca e Ndryshimit), was a centre-right coalition made up from 16 parties and led by Prime Minister Sali Berisha.
- Union for Change (Bashkimi për Ndryshim), was a coalition made up from 5 center-left and left winged Parties, led by that-time Mayor of Tirana Edi Rama.
- Socialist Alliance for Integration (Aleanca Socialiste për Integrim), was a coalition made up from 6 center-left and liberal parties, led by former Prime Minister Ilir Meta.
- Pole of Freedom (Poli i Lirisë), was a conservative coalition made up from 6 right winged parties, led by former Prime Minister Aleksander Meksi.

== Results ==
Party or alliance		Votes	%	Seats
Alliance for Change	Democratic Party of Albania	610,463	40.18	68
Alliance for Change	Republican Party of Albania	31,990	2.11	1
Alliance for Change	Party for Justice and Integration	14,477	0.95	1
Alliance for Change	Environmentalist Agrarian Party	13,296	0.88	0
Alliance for Change	Legality Movement Party	10,711	0.71	0
Alliance for Change	Christian Democratic League	6,095	0.40	0
Alliance for Change	Albanian National Front Party	5,112	0.34	0
Alliance for Change	Liberal Democratic Union	5,008	0.33	0
Alliance for Change	Democratic Alliance Party	4,682	0.31	0
Alliance for Change	Democratic National Front Party	4,177	0.27	0
Alliance for Change	Party of New Albanian European Democracy	2,111	0.14	0
Alliance for Change	New Party of Denied Rights	1,408	0.09	0
Alliance for Change	Alliance for Democracy and Solidarity	1,067	0.07	0
Alliance for Change	Macedonian Alliance for European Integration	1,043	0.07	0
Alliance for Change	Ora of Albania	786	0.05	0
Alliance for Change	Forca Albania	319	0.02	0
Alliance for Change	Total	712,745	46.92	70
Unification for Change	Socialist Party of Albania	620,586	40.85	65
Unification for Change	Social Democratic Party of Albania	26,700	1.76	0
Unification for Change	Unity for Human Rights Party	18,078	1.19	1
Unification for Change	G99	12,989	0.86	0
Unification for Change	Social Democracy Party of Albania	10,395	0.68	0
Unification for Change	Total	688,748	45.34	66
Socialist; Alliance for Integration	Socialist Movement for Integration	73,678	4.85	4
Socialist; Alliance for Integration	Real Socialist Party '91	6,548	0.43	0
Socialist; Alliance for Integration	Freedom and Human Rights Movements	2,931	0.19	0
Socialist; Alliance for Integration	Green Party of Albania	437	0.03	0
Socialist; Alliance for Integration	Party for the Defence of the Rights of the Emigrants	376	0.02	0
Socialist; Alliance for Integration	New Tolerance Party	437	0.03	0
Socialist; Alliance for Integration	Total	84,407	5.56	4
Pole of Freedom	Demochristian Party of Albania	13,308	0.88	0
Pole of Freedom	Movement for National Development	10,753	0.71	0
Pole of Freedom	Albanian Democratic Union Party	1,030	0.07	0
Pole of Freedom	Conservative Party	1,067	0.07	0
Pole of Freedom	Albanian Party of Democratic Reforms	495	0.03	0
Pole of Freedom	Path of Freedom Party	1,002	0.07	0
Pole of Freedom	Total	27,655	1.82	0
Law and Justice Party		4,865	0.32	0
Independents		756	0.05	0
Total		1,519,176	100.00	140
Valid votes		1,519,176	97.01	
Invalid/blank votes		46,903	2.99	
Total votes		1,566,079	100.00	
Registered voters/turnout		3,084,946	50.77	
Source: OSCE

=== Regional level ===
The electorate was split in twelve regions, in a regional proportional system, each of which elected a specific number of Members of Parliament (deputet). The following table details the regional results going from North to South.

Regions	Alliance of Changes		Unification of Changes		Socialist Alliance for Integration		Pole of Freedom		Total seats
Regions	%	Seats	%	Seats	%	Seats	%	Seats	Total seats
Shkodër	58.11	7	35.18	4	2.9	0	3.45	0	11
Kukes	65.00	3	31.31	1	2.97	0	0.67	0	4
Lezhe	54.32	4	34.47	3	5.61	0	3.37	0	7
Diber	57.72	4	32.38	2	5.72	0	4.08	0	6
Durrës	51.65	7	39.22	5	8.02	1	0.85	0	13
Tirane	46.83	16	45.69	15	5.24	1	1.82	0	32
Elbasan	45.06	7	47.77	7	5.04	0	1.94	0	14
Fier	39.98	6	51.83	9	6.47	1	1.55	0	16
Berat	33.16	3	54.62	4	11.35	1	0.68	0	8
Korce	46.96	6	47.82	6	4.21	0	0.59	0	12
Vlore	37.46	5	54.89	7	5.01	0	2.45	0	12
Gjirokastër	40.10	2	55.9	3	3.27	0	0.59	0	5
Total	46.92	70	45.34	66	5.56	4	1.82	0	140

== Aftermath ==
Initially the PD led coalition interred into discussions about dividing up the various cabinet posts.

While it was still unclear whether the PD-led alliance held 70 or 71 seats, the leader of the Socialist Movement for Integration (LSI) announced on 4 July 2009 that he had accepted Berisha's invitation to form a government with the PD and stated he wanted to be a stabilising factor in Albania's path towards European Union membership. With the addition of the four seats from LSI, the coalition had the necessary majority to form a government. Nonetheless, in November 2010, the EU in its "Key findings of the Opinion on Albania" found that the political stalemate since the June 2009 elections was a significant barrier to Albania's candidacy for European Union membership.
