= Alliance for a Magnificent Albania =

Alliance for a Magnificent Albania Aleanca për Shqipërinë Madhështore
- Abbreviation: ASHM
- Leader: Sali Berisha
- General Secretary: Flamur Noka
- Spokesperson: Floriana Garo
- Founder: Sali Berisha
- Founded: 21 April 2001; 25 years ago (first composition); 4 March 2025; 20 months ago (current form)
- Preceded by: Bashkë Fitojmë
- Headquarters: Tirana, Albania
- Ideology: Conservatism; Pro-Europeanism
- Political position: Centre to far-right
- European Parliament group: EPP (PD); ECR (PR); NI (Others)
- Parliament: 49 / 140

Alliance for a Magnificent Albania (Albanian: Aleanca për Shqipërinë Madhështore, ASHM) is a predominantly centre-right Albanian political coalition in the 2025 parliamentary elections consisting of 24 conservative political parties in Albania. It is led by Democratic Party.

== History ==
The Union for Victory Coalition (Albanian: Bashkimi për Fitoren) was a coalition of political parties in Albania. The spokesman was Gent Strazimiri. It received 37.1% of the vote and 46 members of parliament in the 2001 election.

Following the 1997 election and the Civil War. The Democratic party of Albania had lost its majority in parliament and as a result it had to continue to be in parliament as opposition. Sali Berisha had been blamed for the governments mishandling of the Pyramid Schemes. In 2001 Berisha and smaller Centrist and Right wing parties formed the "Union for Victory coalition" The Coalition itself was an attempt to change the bad image of 1997, Sali Berisha dressed his deputies in white shirts and formed the Coalition "Union for Victory". While the Coalition itself did make significant gains. It was not enough for Berisha to become Prime Minister of Albania. According to Berisha then leader of the opposition. "The strategy aimed at bringing this coalition to power will replace the power of the mafia with the rule of law. We come to power, he said, to break the snare of misery". Berisha also had presented the slogan "For a new beginning" However, it disbanded in 2005 before the elections.

In the prelude of the 2005 Albanian parliamentary election, Alliance for Freedom, Justice and Welfare was formed. Albanian National Front Party was not allowed to join for the lack of signatures. The smaller parties acted as de facto Decoy lists for PD.

Alliance of Change (Albanian: Aleanca e Ndyshimit) was a coalition in the Albanian parliamentary election in 2009. Aleanca për Qytetarin (English: Coalition for the Citizen) was a coalition for the Albanian local elections of 2011.

In 2025, Former President Ilir Meta announced that he would run in open-lists of Tirana County.

== Compositions ==
=== Current composition ===
The table below shows the parties composing the coalition:

Party		Leader	Ideology	Position
PD	Democratic Party of Albania; Partia Demokratike e Shqipërisë	Sali Berisha	Conservatism	Centre-right
PL	Freedom Party of Albania; Partia e Lirisë	Ilir Meta	Social democracy Social conservatism	Centre
PDIU	Party for Justice, Integration and Unity; Partia Drejtësi, Integrim dhe Unitet	Shpëtim Idrizi	Cham issue	Right-wing
PAA	Environmentalist Agrarian Party; Partia Agrare Ambientaliste	Agron Duka	Agrarianism	Centre
PBDNJ	Unity for Human Rights Party; Partia Bashkimi për të Drejtat e Njeriut	Vangjel Dule	Greek minority interests	Centre
PR	Republican Party of Albania; Partia Republikane e Shqipërisë	Fatmir Mediu	National conservatism	Right-wing
PLL	Legality Movement Party; Partia Lëvizja e Legalitetit	Shpëtim Axhami	Constitutional monarchism	Right-wing
PDK	Demochristian Party of Albania; Partia Demokristiane e Shqipërisë	Nard Ndoka	Christian democracy	Centre-right
PKD	Christian Democratic Party of Albania; Partia Kristian Demokrate e Shqipërisë	Dhimiter Muslia	Christian democracy	Centre-right
PKKA	National Conservative Party of Albania; Partia Kombëtare Konservatore Albania	Kujtim Gjuzi	Conservatism	Centre-right to right-wing
PBK	Albanian National Front Party; Partia Balli Kombëtar Shqiptar	Adriatik Alimadhi	Albanian nationalism	Far-right
PBD	Albanian Democratic Union Party; Partia Bashkimi Demokrat Shqiptar	Ylber Valteri		
PBKD	Democratic National Front Party; Partia Balli Kombëtar Demokrat	Artur Roshi	Albanian nationalism National conservatism	Right-wing
FRD	New Democratic Spirit; Fryma e Re Demokratike	Sali Shehu	Liberal conservatism	Centre-right
BLD	Liberal Democratic Union; Bashkimi Liberal Demokrat	Arian Starova	Liberalism	Centre
PEISH	Party for Europeanism and Integration of Albania; Partia për Europianizim dhe Integrimin e Shqipërisë	Rivelino Çuno	Romani minority interests Egyptian minority interests	
AAK	Arbnorian National Alliance; Aleanca Arbnore Kombëtare	Gjet Ndoj		
LDKSH	Albanian Demochristian League; Lidhja Demokristiane Shqiptare	Mhill Gecaj	Christian democracy	Centre-right
ORA	Time Party of Albania; Partia Ora e Shqipërisë	Zef Shtjefni		
PESH	Albanian Emigration Party; Partia Emigracioni Shqiptar	Kostaq Papa	Diaspora interests Emigration politics	
PLDN	Democratic Movement for Change Party; Partia Lëvizja Demokratike Për Ndryshim	Nikollin Staka		
PAK	People with Disabilities; Personat me Aftësi të Kufizuar	Gjovalin Shqalshi	Disabilities interests	
RVSH	The True Albanian Path; Rruga e Vërtetë Shqiptare	Muharrem Doda		
AKSH	Conservative Alliance for Albania; Aleanca Konservatore për Shqipërinë	Altin Goxhaj	National conservatism Vaccine hesitancy Right-wing populism	Right-wing

== Election results ==
Parliamentary elections

Election	Leader	Name		Members	Seats
Election	Leader	English	Albanian	Members	Seats
2001	Sali Berisha	Union for Victory Coalition	Bashkimi për Fitoren (PD–BF)	List: Democratic Party of Albania (PD); Legality Movement Party (PLL); Albanian National Front Party (PBK); Republican Party of Albania (PR); Liberal Democratic Union (BLD)	46 / 140
2005	Sali Berisha	Alliance for Freedom, Justice and Welfare	Aleanca për Liri, Drejtësi dhe Mirëqenie (PD–ALDM)	List: Democratic Party of Albania (PD); Republican Party of Albania (PR); Liberal Democratic Union (BLD); New Democratic Party (PDR); Demochristian Party of Albania (PDK); Democratic National Front Party (PBKD); Albanian Democratic Union Party (PBD); Freedom and Human Rights Movements (LDLNJ)	74 / 140
2009	Sali Berisha	Alliance for Change	Aleanca për Ndryshim (PD–AN)	List: Democratic Party of Albania (PD); Republican Party of Albania (PR); Legality Movement Party (PLL); Liberal Democratic Union (BLD); Albanian National Front Party (PBK); Democratic National Front Party (PBKD); Party for Justice and Integration (PDI); Environmentalist Agrarian Party (PAA); Christian Democratic League (LDSH); Democratic Alliance Party (AD); Macedonian Alliance for European Integration (AMIE); Alliance for Democracy and Solidarity (ADS); Ora Party of Albania (ORA); Party of New Albanian European Democracy (PDRESH); New Party of Denied Rights (PDM-Re); Forca Albania (PFA)	70 / 140
2013	Sali Berisha	Alliance for Employment, Prosperity and Integration	Aleanca për Punësim Mirëqenie dhe Integrim (PD–APMI)	List: Democratic Party of Albania (PD); Republican Party of Albania (PR); Demochristian Party of Albania (PDK); Legality Movement Party (PLL); Liberal Democratic Union (BLD); Albanian National Front Party (PBK); Democratic National Front Party (PBKD); Environmentalist Agrarian Party (PAA); Democratic Alliance Party (AD); Macedonian Alliance for European Integration (AMIE); Albanian Democratic Union Party (PBD); Alliance for Democracy and Solidarity (ADS); Time of Albania Party (POSH); Party for Justice, Integration and Unity (PDIU); Movement for National Development (LZHK); Ethnic Greek Minority for the Future (MEGA); Albanian Emigration Party (PESh); New Albania Movement (PLSHR); Albanian Christian Democratic Movement (LDK); New European Democracy Party (PDRE); Party of the Real Albanian Path (PRVSH); Party of Denied Rights (PDM); New Party of Denied Rights (PDM-Re); Peoples Union of Albanian Retirees Party (PBPPSH); Conservative Party (KONS)	57 / 140
2021	Lulzim Basha	Alliance for Change	Aleanca për Ndryshim (PD–AN)	List: Democratic Party of Albania (PD); Party for Justice, Integration and Unity (PDIU); Republican Party of Albania (PR); Environmentalist Agrarian Party (PAA); Movement for National Development (LZHK); Demochristian Party of Albania (PDK); Democratic National Front Party (PBKD); Liberal Democratic Union (BLD); Albanian Democratic Union Party (PBD); Legality Movement Party (PLL); New Democratic Spirit (FRD); Unity for Human Rights Party (PBDNJ); Christian Democratic Party of Albania (PKDSH)	59 / 140
2025	Sali Berisha	Alliance for a Magnificent Albania	Aleanca për Shqipërinë Madhështore (PD–ASHM)	List: Democratic Party of Albania (PS); Freedom Party of Albania (PL); Party for Justice, Integration and Unity (PDIU); Environmentalist Agrarian Party (PAA); Unity for Human Rights Party (PBDNJ); Republican Party of Albania (PR); Legality Movement Party (PLL); Demochristian Party of Albania (PDK); Christian Democratic Party of Albania (PKD); National Conservative Party of Albania (PKKA); Albanian National Front Party (PBK); Albanian Democratic Union Party (PBD); Democratic National Front Party (PBKD); New Democratic Spirit (FRD); Liberal Democratic Union (BLD); Party for Europeanism and Integration of Albania (PEISH); Arbnorian National Alliance (AAK); Albanian Demochristian League (LDKSH); Time Party of Albania (ORA); Albanian Emigration Party (PESH); Democratic Movement for Change Party (PLDN); People with Disabilities (PAK); The True Albanian Path (RVSH); Conservative Alliance for Albania (AKSH)	50 / 140

Local elections

Election	Name		Members
Election	English	Albanian	Members
2011	Coalition of the Citizen	Aleanca për Qytetarin (PD–AQ)	List: Democratic Party of Albania (PD); Party for Justice, Integration and Unity (PDIU); Republican Party of Albania (PR); Environmentalist Agrarian Party (PAA); Socialist Movement for Integration (LSI); Demochristian Alliance Party of Albania (ADK); Democratic National Front Party (PBKD); Liberal Democratic Union (BLD); Albanian National Front Party (PKD); Legality Movement Party (PLL); Democratic Alliance Party (AD); People's Alliance Party (PAK); Albanian Christian Democratic Movement (LDK); Conservative Party (KONS); Macedonian Alliance for European Integration (AMIE); Time of Albania Party (POSH); New Party of Denied Rights (PDM-Re); People with Disabilities Party (PPAK); New European Democracy Party (PDRE); European Ecological Alliance (AEE); Alliance for Democracy and Solidarity (ADS)
2015	People's Alliance for Work and Dignity	Aleanca Popullore për Punë dhe Dinjitet (PD–APPD)	List: Democratic Party of Albania (PD); Republican Party of Albania (PR); Environmentalist Agrarian Party (PAA); Christian Democratic People's Party of Albania; Democratic National Front Party (PBKD); Liberal Democratic Union (BLD); Albanian National Front Party (PKD); Legality Movement Party (PLL); Albanian Christian Democratic Movement (LDK); Conservative Party (KONS); Time of Albania Party (POSH); Liberal Right Party
2023	Together We Win	Bashkë Fitojmë (BF)	List: Democratic Party of Albania (PD) factions; Freedom Party of Albania (PL); Demochristian Party of Albania (PDK); Unity for Human Rights Party (PBDNJ)
