= APPD =

APPD may refer to:

- Anarchist Pogo Party of Germany (German: Anarchistische Pogo-Partei Deutschlands)
- People's Alliance for Work and Dignity (APPD), in the 2015 Albanian local elections
