= 2001 Albanian parliamentary election =

- 24 June 2001 (first round); 8 July 2001 (second round)
- All 140 seats in the Parliament of Albania; 71 seats needed for a majority
- Turnout: 53.62% (▼18.94pp)
Party	Leader	Vote %	Seats	+/–
PS	Fatos Nano	41.44	73	−27
BF	Sali Berisha	36.89	46	+15
PDR	Genc Pollo	5.09	6	New
PSD	Skënder Gjinushi	3.65	4	−5
PBDNJ	Vasil Melo	2.60	3	−1
AD	Neritan Ceka	2.56	3	+1
PAA	Lufter Xhuveli	2.56	3	+2
Independents	–		2	−1
This lists parties that won seats. See the complete results below.
Prime Minister before	Elected Prime Minister
Ilir Meta; PS	Ilir Meta; PS

Parliamentary elections were held in Albania on 24 June 2001. The result was a victory for the ruling Socialist Party of Albania, which won 73 of the 140 seats, resulting in Ilir Meta remaining Prime Minister. Voter turnout was 54%.

== Electoral system ==
The Assembly of Albania has 140 members of whom 100 are elected by plurality vote in single-member constituencies and 40 members are elected through a party-list proportional representation system.

== Campaign ==
President Rexhep Meidani announced on 18 April 2001 that the first round of the elections would be held on 24 June, with the second round on 8 July. The governing Socialist Party had the aim of gaining 60% of the vote, in order to have a sufficient majority to elect a new president in 2002. They campaigned on infrastructure improvements such as communication and transport and on their record in restoring order and economic growth. They were also boosted by achieving the opening of negotiations with the European Union on a Stabilisation and Association Agreement just before the election.

The main opposition party, the Democratic Party of Albania led by ex-President Sali Berisha, had moderated their message after losing the 2000 local elections. They formed a coalition of right wing parties, the Union for Victory Coalition, and said that they were open to dealing with other parties if they won the election. They hoped to make gains due to public concern over corruption and the continuing poverty in Albania.

The campaign was generally peaceful and with no reliable opinion polls most observers expected the ruling Socialists to be re-elected with a smaller majority.

== Results ==
Both main parties initially claimed victory after the first round on the 24 June in which turnout reached about 60%. The governing Socialist party claimed that they won 45 of the 100 seats. Monitors from the Organization for Security and Co-operation in Europe (OSCE) described the election as having made progress towards international democratic standards. However the opposition Democratic party claimed there was widespread intimidation and electoral fraud. Procedural differences led to polling stations being kept closed in Lushnje leading to voting having to be delayed for about 30,000 people. The results of the first round showed that the Socialists won 33 seats as against 17 won by the Democrats.

A run-off vote to decide the winner in 51 districts where no candidate won over half the vote in the first round was held on 8 July. Another 40 seats were decided in proportion to the share of the vote each party won.

Party	Votes	%	Seats			
Party	Votes	%	Constituency	Party list	Total	+/–
Socialist Party of Albania	555,272	42.27	73	0	73	–27
Union for Victory Coalition	494,272	37.63	25	21	46	+15
New Democratic Party	68,181	5.19	0	6	6	New
Social Democratic Party of Albania	48,911	3.72	0	4	4	–5
Unity for Human Rights Party	34,897	2.66	0	3	3	–1
Democratic Alliance Party	34,262	2.61	0	3	3	+1
Environmentalist Agrarian Party	34,247	2.61	0	3	3	+2
Democratic Party of Albania	13,867	1.06	0	0	0	–
Demochristian Party of Albania	12,226	0.93	0	0	0	–2
Social Christian Party of Albania	9,224	0.70	0	0	0	New
Albanian Democratic Union Party	8,123	0.62	0	0	0	0
Independents			2	0	2	–1
Total	1,313,482	100.00	100	40	140	–15
Valid votes	1,290,677	96.32				
Invalid/blank votes	49,310	3.68				
Total votes	1,339,987	100.00				
Registered voters/turnout	2,499,238	53.62				
Source: Nohlen & Stöver, (Note: The data is inconsistent and there is a difference of 22,805 between the parties' total and the number of valid votes.) Adam Carr

== Aftermath ==
The Constitutional Court ruled that voting had to be repeated in eight districts on 22 July and a further two on 29 July. International observers described the elections as a whole as having been free and fair. However the opposition Democrats said they would not accept the results. They described the election as a farce and started a boycott of Parliament. The boycott lasted for six months until January 2002 when Sali Berisha announced that his party was returning to Parliament.
