= Party of Truth =

Party of Truth or Truth Party may refer to:

- Albanian Path of Truth Party, a political party in Albania
- Party of Truth (Yemen), a political party in Yemen
- Sabah Truth Party, a political party in Malaysia
- Shinri Party (Truth Party), the former political wing of the Japanese new religious movement Aum Shinrikyo
- Truth Party (Finland), a far-right political party in Finland
