= 2000 Albanian local elections =

2000 Albanian Local Elections
- 1 October 2000

The Albanian local elections in 2000 were the third local elections held in Albania. The elections were held on 1 October 2000.
