= Unity for Human Rights Party =

Albanian political party

Unity for Human Rights Party Albanian: Partia Bashkimi për të Drejtat e Njeriut Greek: Κόμμα Ένωσης Ανθρωπίνων Δικαιωμάτων
- Leader: Vangjel Dule
- Founded: 1992
- Headquarters: Sarandë
- Ideology: Greek minority interests; Social liberalism; Civic nationalism; Pro-Europeanism
- Political position: Centre
- National affiliation: Bashkë Fitojmë; Alliance for a Magnificent Albania
- European Parliament group: European People's Party Group (Note: Fredis Beleris)
- Colours: Blue, yellow and white
- Parliament: 1 / 140
- Municipalities: 0 / 61
- Council Seats: 2 / 1,613

Website
- https://pbdnj.com/

The Unity for Human Rights Party (Albanian: Partia Bashkimi për të Drejtat e Njeriut, Greek: Κόμμα Ένωσης Ανθρωπίνων Δικαιωμάτων) is a social-liberal political party in Albania supporting the Greek minority. Founded in 1992, it represents Albania's minorities and is mainly related to the Greek minority, and is the political continuation of Omonoia. It works with Omonoia, MEGA and other Greek parties in Albania at national elections, under a Greek bloc. The party is currently led by Vangjel Dule, who holds the party's only seat in Parliament.

== History ==
The party first contested national elections in 1992, when it received 2.7% of the national vote and won two seats. The 1996 elections saw the party increase its share of the vote to 4%, winning three seats. Although the party's vote share dropped to 3.2% in the early elections in 1997, it gained an additional MP, winning four seats. However, another drop in the party's support in the 2001 elections saw it reduced to three seats. Despite again increasing its vote share to 4.1% in the 2005 elections, the party lost another MP as it was reduced to two seats. The 2009 elections saw the party reduced to one seat.

In the 2011 local elections the party lost its councillors in Gjirokastër and Delvinë and one of its two municipal seats in Sarandë, maintained its seat Shkodër and gained one of the seats in Korçë in addition to the mayoralty in nine communes. In the 2013 parliamentary elections it retained its single seat, running as part of the Alliance for a European Albania headed by the Socialist Party.

In the 2015 local elections the party failed to win any mayoralties, losing seats to other Greek parties such as MEGA/EEM, as well as the Socialist Party.

In the parliamentary elections of 2017 it joined forces with the Democratic Party and fielded two candidates: the party leader Vangjel Dule in Vlorë and one in Korçë County, with the former being elected. It continued its alliance with the Democratic Party in the 2021 parliamentary elections, in which it won a single seat on the Democratic Party's list.

== Election results ==
Election	Votes	%	Seats	+/–	Status
1992	48,923	2.69 (#5)	2 / 140	▲2	Opposition
1996	66,529	4.04 (#3)	3 / 140	▲1	Opposition
1997	37,191	2.84 (#4)	4 / 140	▲1	Coalition
2001	34,897	2.84 (#5)	3 / 140	▼1	Coalition
2005	56,403	2.84 (#10)	2 / 140	▼1	Coalition
2009	18,078	1.19 (#6)	1 / 140	▼1	Opposition
2013	6,089	0.85 (#6)	1 / 140	0	Opposition
2017	Did not participate				Extraparliamentary
2021	Part of PD-AN		1 / 140	▲1	Opposition
