= Republican Party of Albania =

Republican Party of Albania Partia Republikane e Shqipërisë
- Leader: Fatmir Mediu
- Founder: Sabri Godo
- Founded: 10 January 1991
- Headquarters: Tirana
- Ideology: National conservatism
- Political position: Right-wing
- National affiliation: Alliance for a Magnificent Albania
- European affiliation: AEN (2002–2009); ECR Party (global partner)
- Colours: Blue
- Parliament: 1 / 140
- Council Seats: 34 / 1,613

The Republican Party of Albania (Albanian: Partia Republikane e Shqipërisë, PR or PRSH) is a political party in Albania. It currently holds 1 of the 140 seats in the Parliament of Albania, in alliance with the Democratic Party of Albania.

== History ==
The party was founded on 10 January 1991 under the leadership of the writer Sabri Godo, who was also its first Chairman. The party was formed with the backing of the Italian Republican Party. After the Democratic Party, it was the second party to be founded in Albania after the anti-communist revolution in the autumn of 1990.

In the 1992 elections the party received 2.9% of the national vote and won a single seat. They joined a coalition with the Democratic Party, but had little influence on the policies being shaped. The 1996 elections saw the party almost double its share of the vote to 5.9%, winning three seats. After the 1997 uprising, in which the center-right coalition was overthrown by socialist supporters, the party became an opposition party. In the 1997 elections the party was reduced to a single seat.

Before the 2001 elections, the party joined the Union for Victory Coalition under the leadership of the Democratic Party, which won 46 seats. In the 2005 elections the party received 20% of the vote in the national voting for the proportional seats, putting it in first place. Although it won 11 proportional seats, it failed to win a single constituency seat, resulting in the party only being the third largest in Parliament. For the 2009 elections the party was part of the "Alliance for Changes" coalition. However, it was reduced to a single seat, after seeing its vote share fall to just 2.1% of the national total. In the 2011 local elections the party won a total of 67,039 votes throughout the country, twice the amount they had received in the 2009 Albanian parliamentary election.

== Election results ==
Election	Votes	%	Seats	+/–	Status
1991	27,393	1.47	0 / 250	–	Extraparliamentary
1992	52,477	2.89	1 / 140	▲1	Coalition government (until 1994)
1996	94,567	5.74	3 / 140	▲2	Coalition government
1997	31,573	2.41	1 / 155	▼2	Opposition
2001	Part of BF		5 / 140	▲4	Opposition
2005	272,746	19.96	11 / 140	▲6	Coalition government
2009	31,990	2.11	1 / 140	▼10	Coalition government
2013	52,168	3.02	3 / 140	▲2	Opposition
2017	3,225	0.20	0 / 140	▼3	Extraparliamentary
2021	Part of PD–AN		3 / 140	▲3	Opposition
2025	Part of ASHM		1 / 140	▼2	Opposition
