= Albanian Path of Truth Party =

Political party in Albania

Albanian Path of Truth Party (in Albanian: Partia Rruga e Vërtetë Shqiptare) is a political party in Albania led by Muharrem Doda.
