= Christian Democratic Party of Albania =

Christian Democratic Party of Albania Partia Kristian Demokrate e Shqipërisë
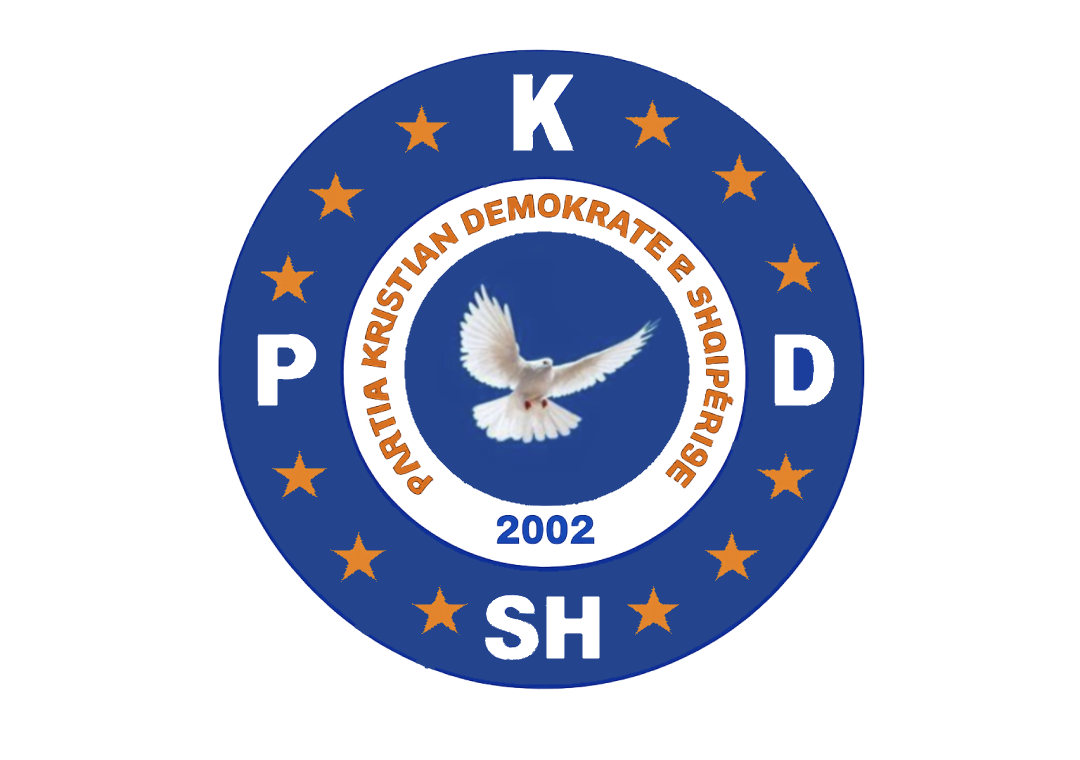
- Leader: Dhimiter Muslia
- Founded: 2013
- Headquarters: Zogu I Parë Boulevard, Tirana
- Ideology: Christian democracy; Conservatism
- Political position: Centre-right
- National affiliation: Alliance for a Magnificent Albania
- Colours: Blue
- Parliament: 0 / 140
- Council seats: 8 / 1,613

Website
- http://pkd.al

The Christian Democratic Party of Albania (Albanian: Partia Kristian Demokrate e Shqipërisë, PKD) is a small Christian democratic political party in Albania.

== History ==
The party was established on 26 March 2013. In the June 2013 parliamentary elections the PKD was part of the Alliance for a European Albania, led by the Socialist Party. It received 0.5% of the vote, winning a single seat in Parliament. In the 2017 elections the party's vote share fell to 0.2% and it lost parliamentary representation. During the 2021 election it joined the Democratic party and its alliance giving the party support.
