= Democratic National Front Party =

Albanian Right-Wing political party founded in 1998 (PBDK)

Democratic National Front Party Partia Balli Kombëtar Demokrat
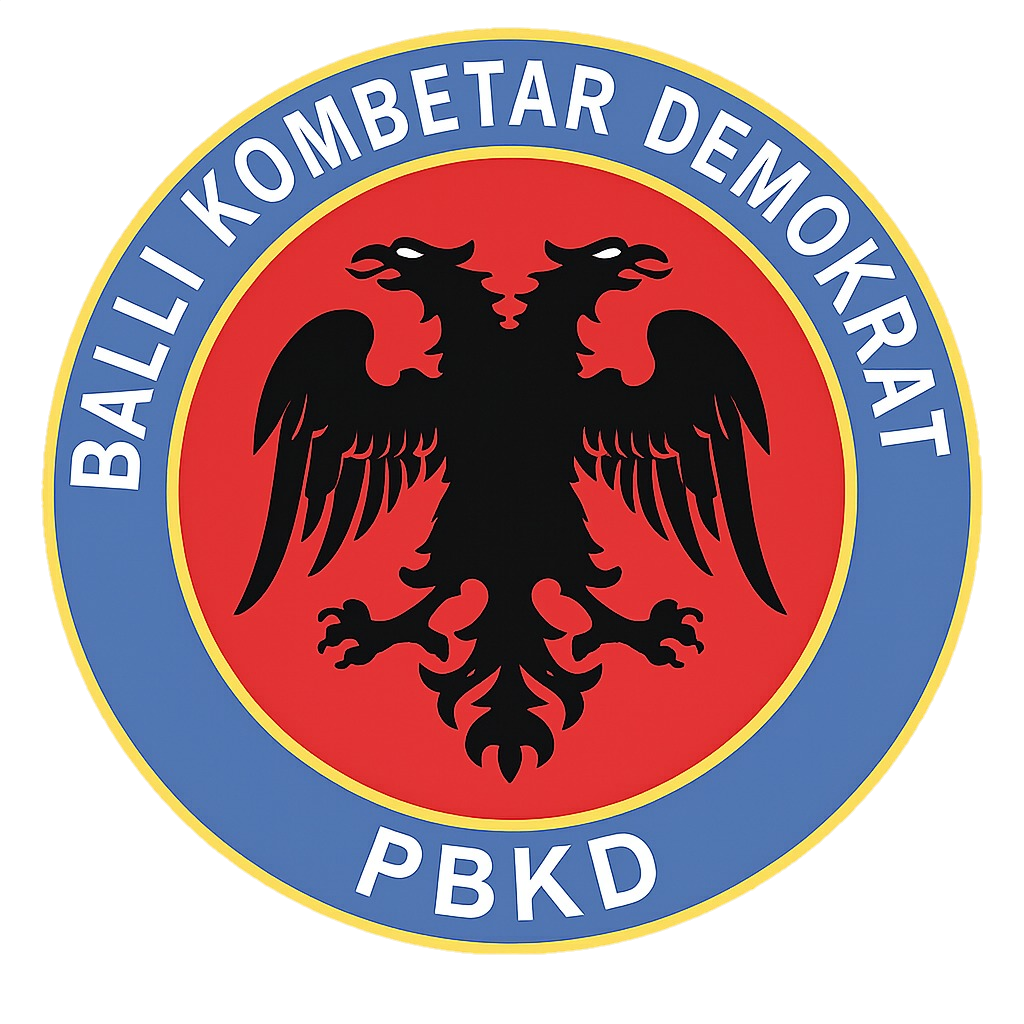
- Leader: Artur Roshi
- Founder: Hysen Selfo
- Founded: 1998
- Split from: Albanian National Front Party
- Headquarters: Tirana
- Ideology: Albanian nationalism; National conservatism; Social conservatism; Anti-communism
- Political position: Right-wing
- National affiliation: Alliance for a Magnificent Albania
- European Parliament group: Motto - "Partia jonë është Shqipëria" (Our party is Albania)
- Colours: Red Black
- semi-autonomous branches: Democratic National Front Kosovo
- Parliament of Albania: 0 / 140
- Assembly of the Republic of Kosovo: 0 / 120

The Democratic National Front Party (Albanian: Partia Balli Kombëtar Demokrat; PBKD), also sometimes referred to as the Right National Front or Right National Party, is a political party in Albania led by Artur Roshi. It was formed in 1998 by breaking away from the ultra-nationalist National Front. The PBKD is a right-wing group with nationalist policies which aim to create a Greater Albania. It remains closely linked to the National Front, but has made its policies more moderate.

In the 2005 elections, PBKD was part of the Alliance for Freedom, Justice and Welfare. PBKD got 0.6% of the proportional votes, and no seats.

In 2005 the congress of the National Front rejected a proposal to merge the two parties.

== History ==
The party was formed in 1997-1998 as a result of personal disagreements between Hysen Selfo, then deputy leader of the National Front, and the National Front's leader Abaz Ermenji.

The National Front parties trace their origins to the 1940s. Balli Kombëtar (English: The National Front) was an Albanian nationalist and anti-communist organization established in 1942. It was led by Ali Këlcyra and Mit'hat Frashëri.

In 1942 Balli Kombëtar entered into a fragile alliance with the Communist-led National Liberation Front, and acted as a resistance group against Italian and German occupation forces in Albania. However, when it appeared that the communists were to seize power in Albania, the organisation began collaboration with the Axis powers during their occupation of Greece and Yugoslavia. In 1943 for example, members recruited by the organization participated alongside the Wehrmacht in burning villages in Albania and Greece and on the territory, which is today the modern North Macedonia.

The party held one seat in the Parliament of Albania from 2019 to 2021, the mp was the party's deputy, Artur Roshi
