= Liberal Democratic Union (Albania) =

Liberal Democratic Union Bashkimi Liberal Demokrat
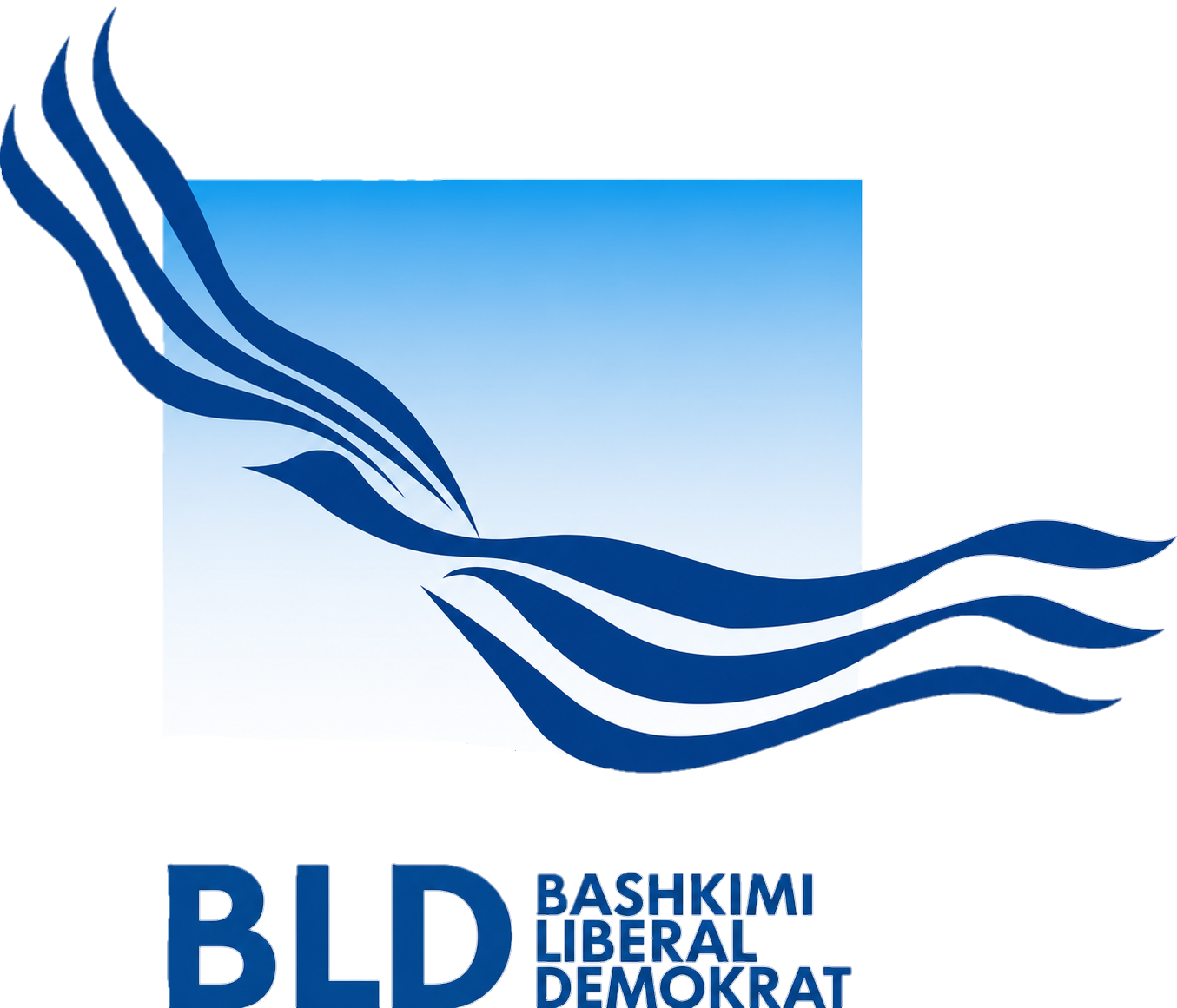
- Leader: Arian Starova
- Founded: 1995
- Ideology: Liberalism; Social democracy
- Political position: Centre
- National affiliation: Alliance for a Magnificent Albania
- Colours: Aqua (light blue), White

Party flag

The Liberal Democratic Union (Albanian: Bashkimi Liberal Demokrat) is a political party in Albania.

== History ==
It was founded in 1995 with the name Social Democratic Union of Albania. The party began as a breakaway faction of the Social Democratic Party of Albania. The break-away was motivated by the Social Democratic Party leaving the governing coalition with the Democratic Party and the desire of some members to maintain their ministerial posts or other high governmental appointments. Initially, the break-away faction, consisting of those wanting to keep their posts, was known as the Social Democratic Union, later changing its name to the Liberal Democratic Union.

In the 2001 elections it was part of the Union for Victory (Bashkimi për Fitoren) coalition which received 37.1% of the vote and 46 members of parliament. On its own, the Liberal Democratic Union consistently has received under 1% of the vote in general elections.

In the 2005 elections, BLD was part of the Alliance for Freedom, Justice, and Welfare. BLD won one seat through the proportional quota of the Democratic Party of Albania. It did not itself receive sufficient votes for any representation in Parliament.

== See also ==
- Liberalism
- Contributions to liberal theory
- Liberalism worldwide
- List of liberal parties
- Liberal democracy
- Liberalism in Albania
