= Albanian National Front Party =

Albanian National Front Party Partia Balli Kombëtar Shqiptar
- Abbreviation: PBK
- Chairman: Adriatik Alimadhi
- Secretary-General: Arben Hoxha
- Founder: Abas Ermenji
- Founded: 23 December 1989; 36 years ago
- Preceded by: Balli Kombëtar (1939–1945)
- Headquarters: Tirana, Albania; Pristina, Kosovo; Tetovo, North Macedonia
- Ideology: Albanian irredentism; Albanian nationalism; Anti-communism; National conservatism; Right-wing populism; Social conservatism
- Political position: Far-right
- National affiliation: Alliance for a Magnificent Albania
- Colours: Albanian national colours: Red; Black
- Slogan: Albania of Albanians (Shqipëria e shqiptarëve)
- Assembly of Albania: 0 / 140
- Assembly of Kosovo: 0 / 120
- Assembly of North Macedonia: 0 / 120
- Council seats: 5 / 1,613

Website
- shqiperiaeshqipetarve.wordpress.com

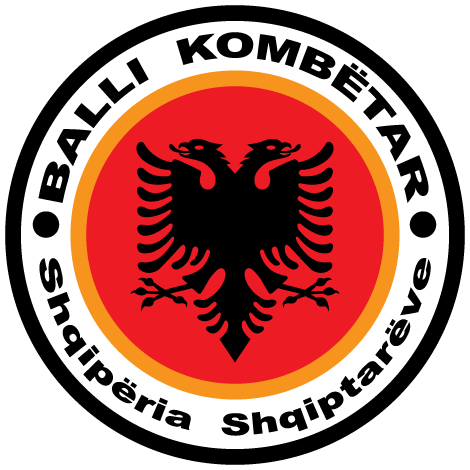

The Albanian National Front Party (Albanian: Partia Balli Kombëtar Shqiptar, PBK) is a nationalist political party in Albania, Kosovo, and North Macedonia.

== Party Chairs ==
| Chairman | Period |
|---|---|
| Abas Ermenji | 1992 - 2000 |
| Shpëtim Roqi | 2000 - 2003 |
| Adriatik Alimadhi | 2003 - present |

== History ==
In the 2001 elections it was part of the Union for Victory (Bashkimi për Fitoren) coalition which received 37.1% of the vote and 46 members of parliament.

== PBK Council ==
Members of the Council:

- Chairman: Adriatik Alimadhi
- Deputy Chairman: Majlinda Toro
- Chairman of National Council: Luan Myftiu
- Secretary General: Arben Hoxha
- Organizing Secretary: Kujtim Lamaj
