= Albanian Democratic Union Party =

Political party in Albania

- Leader: Ylber Valteri
- Founded: 1993
- National affiliation: Alliance for a Magnificent Albania

Party flag
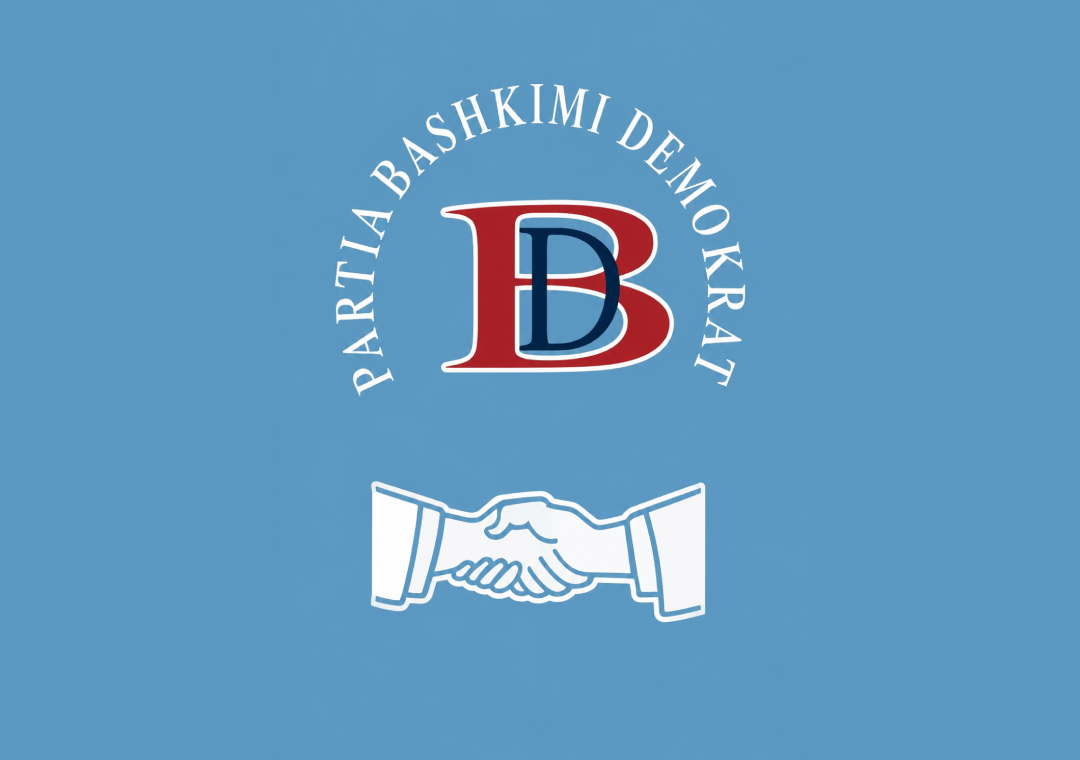

The Albanian Democratic Union Party (Albanian: Partia Bashkimi Demokrat Shqiptar, PBDSH) is a political party in Albania led by Ylber Valteri. The party was founded in 1993. In the 2009 parliamentary elections the party received 0.08%.
