= 2005 Albanian parliamentary election =

- 3 July 2005
- All 140 seats in Parliament; 71 seats needed for a majority
- Turnout: 49.07% (▼4.55pp)
| Party | Leader | Seats | +/– |
|---|---|---|---|
| PD | Sali Berisha | 56 | +10 |
| PS | Fatos Nano | 42 | −31 |
| PR | Fatmir Mediu | 11 | +6 |
| PSD | Skënder Gjinushi | 7 | +3 |
| LSI | Ilir Meta | 5 | New |
| PDR | Genc Pollo | 4 | +1 |
| PAA | Lufter Xhuveli | 4 | +1 |
| AD | Neritan Ceka | 3 | 0 |
| PDS | Paskal Milo | 2 | New |
| PBDNJ | Vangjel Dule | 2 | −1 |
| PDK | Nard Ndoka | 2 | +2 |
| BLD | Arjan Starova | 1 | New |
| Independents | – | 1 | −1 |
This lists parties that won seats. See the complete results below.
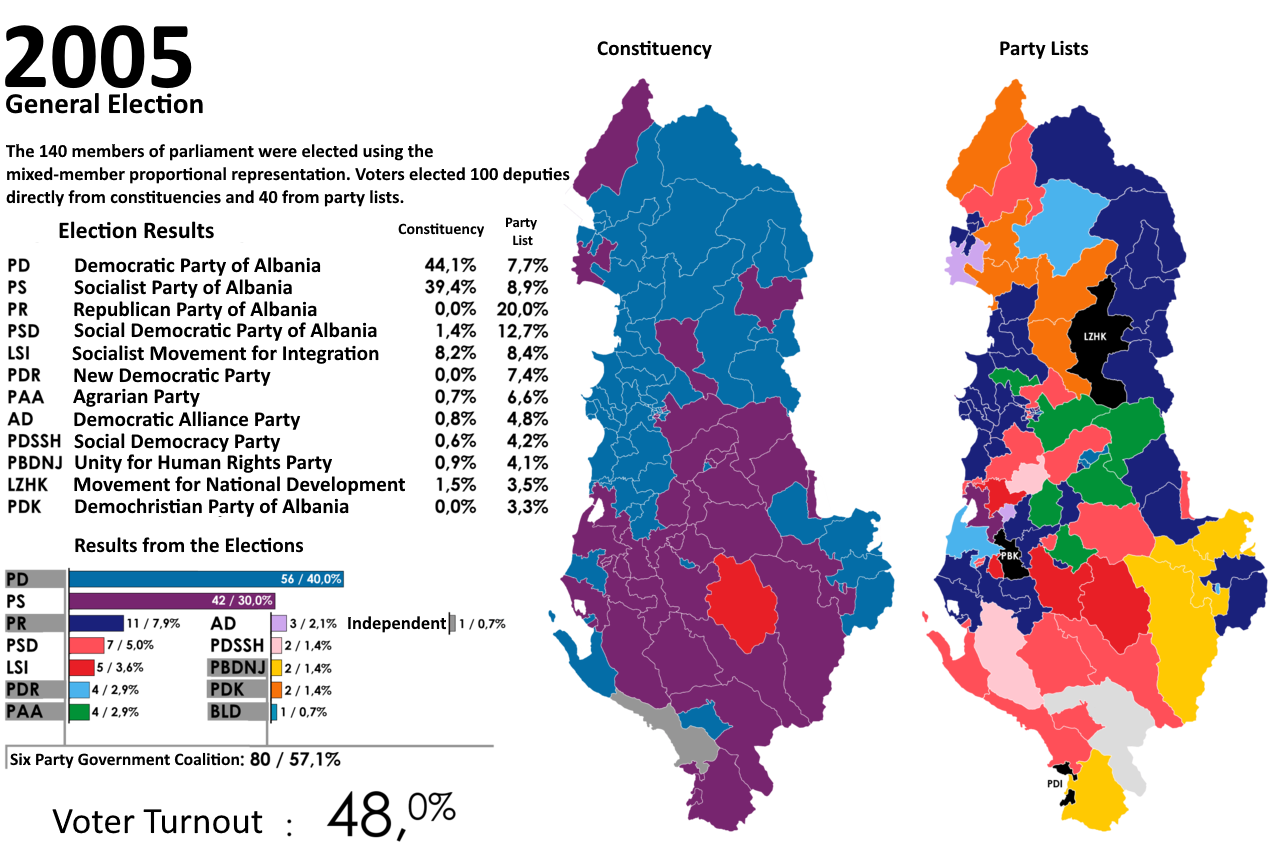
| Prime Minister before | Prime Minister after |
|---|---|
| Fatos Nano; PS | Sali Berisha; PD |

Parliamentary elections were held in Albania on 3 July 2005. The result was a victory for the opposition Democratic Party (PD) and its allies, prominently the Republican Party (PR). Former president Sali Berisha became prime minister as a result of the election.

== Electoral system ==
The 140 members of parliament were elected using the mixed-member proportional representation. Voters elected 100 deputies directly from constituencies and 40 from party lists.

== Conduct ==
The proper conduct of the election was seen as crucial in maintaining Albania's eventual EU hopes. For the most part, election day was peaceful, but OSCE monitors said that the poll only partially complied with international standards, citing disorganization, improper procedures and "a few violent incidents." The Central Election Commission (CEC) received over 300 complaints.

Monitors from the Organization for Security and Co-operation in Europe called the election a “disappointment,” saying it failed to comply with international standards because of “serious irregularities,” intimidation, vote-buying and “violence committed by extremists on both sides.”

== Results ==
On 14 July the CEC released final results for 97 constituencies as well as the tentative national proportional results. The clear winners were the Democratic Party and its allies, though with many close constituency races between the PD and the governing Socialist Party of Albania (PSSh). The only party to win both proportional and constituency-level seats was the Socialist Movement for Integration (LSI) of former prime minister Ilir Meta, as Meta himself won the party's lone constituency mandate. Despite this, the LSI did not fulfill pre-election expectations that it might emerge as a dealmaker in the next parliament.

| Party or alliance | | Constituency | | | Party list | | | Total seats | +/– |
| Party or alliance | | Votes | % | Seats | Votes | % | Seats | Total seats | +/– |
|---|---|---|---|---|---|---|---|---|---|
| Alliance for Freedom, Justice and Welfare | Democratic Party of Albania | 602,066 | 44.06 | 56 | 104,796 | 7.67 | 0 | 56 | +10 |
| Alliance for Freedom, Justice and Welfare | Republican Party of Albania | | | | 272,746 | 19.96 | 11 | 11 | +6 |
| Alliance for Freedom, Justice and Welfare | New Democratic Party | | | | 101,373 | 7.42 | 4 | 4 | +1 |
| Alliance for Freedom, Justice and Welfare | Demochristian Party of Albania | | | | 44,576 | 3.26 | 2 | 2 | +2 |
| Alliance for Freedom, Justice and Welfare | Liberal Democratic Union | | | | 14,418 | 1.06 | 1 | 1 | New |
| Alliance for Freedom, Justice and Welfare | Freedom and Human Rights Movements | | | | 9,027 | 0.66 | 0 | 0 | New |
| Alliance for Freedom, Justice and Welfare | Democratic National Front Party | | | | 7,632 | 0.56 | 0 | 0 | New |
| Alliance for Freedom, Justice and Welfare | Albanian Democratic Union Party | | | | 7,371 | 0.54 | 0 | 0 | 0 |
| Alliance for Freedom, Justice and Welfare | Total | 602,066 | 44.06 | 56 | 561,939 | 41.13 | 18 | 74 | +24 |
| Socialist Party of Albania | | 538,906 | 39.44 | 42 | 121,412 | 8.89 | 0 | 42 | –31 |
| Socialist Movement for Integration | | 112,451 | 8.23 | 1 | 114,798 | 8.40 | 4 | 5 | New |
| Movement for National Development | | 20,955 | 1.53 | 0 | 47,967 | 3.51 | 0 | 0 | New |
| Social Democratic Party of Albania | | 18,365 | 1.34 | 0 | 174,103 | 12.74 | 7 | 7 | +3 |
| Unity for Human Rights Party | | 12,171 | 0.89 | 0 | 56,403 | 4.13 | 2 | 2 | –1 |
| Democratic Alliance Party | | 10,649 | 0.78 | 0 | 65,093 | 4.76 | 3 | 3 | 0 |
| Environmentalist Agrarian Party | | 9,988 | 0.73 | 0 | 89,635 | 6.56 | 4 | 4 | +1 |
| Social Democracy Party of Albania | | 8,514 | 0.62 | 0 | 57,998 | 4.25 | 2 | 2 | New |
| Communist Party of Albania | | 3,891 | 0.28 | 0 | 8,937 | 0.65 | 0 | 0 | New |
| Party of Labour of Albania | | 3,449 | 0.25 | 0 | 9,292 | 0.68 | 0 | 0 | New |
| Alliance for Welfare and Solidarity | | 1,726 | 0.13 | 0 | 5,029 | 0.37 | 0 | 0 | New |
| Social Albanian Parties – National Unity Party | | 1,433 | 0.10 | 0 | 3,260 | 0.24 | 0 | 0 | New |
| Albanian National Front Party (Note: Originally intended to be part of the PD-alliance but due to lack of signatures not allowed to join.) | | 1,277 | 0.09 | 0 | 22,896 | 1.68 | 0 | 0 | New |
| Albanian Democratic Monarchist Movement Party | | 957 | 0.07 | 0 | 774 | 0.06 | 0 | 0 | New |
| Albanian Green League | | 638 | 0.05 | 0 | 1,710 | 0.13 | 0 | 0 | New |
| Albanian Democratic Party for a New Right Democracy | | 555 | 0.04 | 0 | 1,794 | 0.13 | 0 | 0 | New |
| Albanian National Community Party | | 548 | 0.04 | 0 | | | | 0 | New |
| Democratic Movement for Integration | | 505 | 0.04 | 0 | | | | 0 | New |
| Albanian Future Party | | 445 | 0.03 | 0 | | | | 0 | New |
| Albanian Socialist Alliance Party | | 245 | 0.02 | 0 | 6,604 | 0.48 | 0 | 0 | New |
| Albanian Party of Democratic Reforms | | 231 | 0.02 | 0 | | | | 0 | New |
| Communist Party of Albania 8 November | | 124 | 0.01 | 0 | | | | 0 | New |
| Social Christian Party of Albania | | 107 | 0.01 | 0 | | | | 0 | 0 |
| People's Alliance Party | | 99 | 0.01 | 0 | | | | 0 | New |
| Albanian National Reconciliation Party | | 78 | 0.01 | 0 | | | | 0 | New |
| Albanian Emigration Party | | 34 | 0.00 | 0 | | | | 0 | New |
| Green Party of Albania | | 22 | 0.00 | 0 | | | | 0 | New |
| Party for Justice and Integration | | | | | 16,012 | 1.17 | 0 | 0 | New |
| Albanian National Security Party | | | | | 570 | 0.04 | 0 | 0 | New |
| Independents | | 16,077 | 1.18 | 1 | | | | 1 | –1 |
| Total | | 1,366,506 | 100.00 | 100 | 1,366,226 | 100.00 | 40 | 214 | 0 |
| Valid votes | | 1,366,506 | 97.78 | | 1,366,226 | 98.42 | | | |
| Invalid/blank votes | | 31,013 | 2.22 | | 21,973 | 1.58 | | | |
| Total votes | | 1,397,519 | 100.00 | | 1,388,199 | 100.00 | | | |
| Registered voters/turnout | | 2,848,144 | 49.07 | | 2,850,821 | 48.69 | | | |
Source: CLEA (constituency), CEC (compensatory)
