= 23rd Kuvendi =

Albanian legislature

Twenty-Third Legislature of Albania Legjislatura e njëzet e tre e Shqipërisë
- XXIII Legislature; III Pluralist Legislature

Type
- Type: Unicameral
- Term limits: Four years

History
- Founded: March 22, 1992
- Disbanded: May 26, 1996
- Preceded by: 22nd Legislature
- Succeeded by: 24th Legislature

Leadership
- Speaker of the Parliament: Pjetër Arbnori, PD
- Prime Minister: Aleksandër Meksi

Structure
- Seats: 140 deputies
- Political groups: Government (86): PD (85); BSD (1); Opposition (54): PS (38); PSD (6); AD (6); PBDNJ (2); PR (1); PDD (1)

Elections
- Last election: 22 March 1992

The Twenty-third Legislature of Albania (Albanian: Legjislatura e njëzet e tre e Shqipërisë ), officially known as the III Pluralist Legislature of Albania (Albanian: Legjislatura e III Pluraliste e Shqipërisë), was the legislature of Albania following the 1992 Albanian Parliamentary election of Members of Parliament (MPs) to the Albanian Parliament. The party of the Prime Minister Aleksandër Meksi, PD, had originally obtained majority of 100 deputies. Sali Berisha was elected as President of Albania.

== 23rd Legislature ==
The two largest political parties in Albania are the Socialist Party (PS) and the Democratic Party (PD). The former Communist party rebranded as the Socialist Party would come in second place with 38 deputies. Following is a list of political parties and alliances with representation in the Parliament by the 1992 elections. The Democrats originally held 92 seats. However, due to disruptions between members 6 out of the 92 members of the Democratic Party withdrew from the parties institutions. Led by former parliamentary group leader Neritan Ceka. He and Arben Imami would go on into created the Democratic Alliance Party. Which would consist of 6 Democrat dissidents. While not just Neritan Ceka. Petrit Kalakulla would ultimately be expelled from the Democratic party where he would go on and create the Right Democratic Party. His explosion was due to the claims he had made during the parliamentary session that it would be more ennobling for him if someone called him a "fascist" than a "communist". In 1994 The Republican party and the Social Democratic party would pull out of the Democratic parties coalition. Some of the Social Democratic party members would go on to create the Liberal Democratic Union which was originally known as Social Democratic Union Party. Which was led by Teodor Laço.

== Composition ==
Composition as shows following the end of the 23rd parliament session:

Name	Abbr.	Founded	Leader	Ideology	MPs
Democratic Party of Albania Partia Demokratike e Shqipërisë	PD	1990	Tritan Shehu	Liberal conservatism, Conservatism, Centre-right	85 / 140
Socialist Party of Albania Partia Socialiste e Shqipërisë	PS	1991	Fatos Nano	Social democracy, Centre-left	38 / 140
Social Democratic Party of Albania Partia Socialdemokrate e Shqipërisë	PSD	1991	Skënder Gjinushi	Social democracy, Centre-left	6 / 140
Democratic Alliance Party Partia Aleanca Demokratike	AD	1992	Neritan Ceka	Liberalism, Centre	6 / 140
Unity for Human Rights Party Partia Bashkimi për të Drejtat e Njeriut	PBDNJ	1992	Vasil Melo	Social Liberalism, Greek minority interests, Centre	2 / 140
Republican Party of Albania Partia Republikane e Shqipërisë	PR	1991	Sabri Godo	National conservatism, Social conservatism, Centre-right	1 / 140
Right Democratic Party Partia Demokratike e Djathtë	PDD	1995	Petrit Kalakulla	Conservatism, Far Right	1 / 140
Social Democratic Union Party Partia Bashkimi Social Demokrat	BSD	1995	Teodor Laço	Liberalism, Social democracy, Centre	1 / 140
