= Tom Doshi =

Albanian businessman and politician

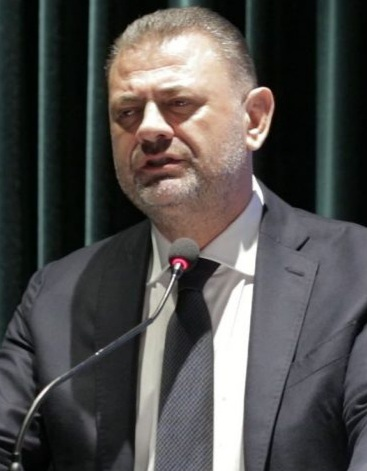
- Doshi in 2021

Member of the Albanian Parliament
- In office 2 September 2005 – 27 May 2021
- Constituency: Shkodër

Chairman of the Social Democratic Party of Albania
- Incumbent
- Assumed office 17 December 2020
- Preceded by: Skënder Gjinushi

Personal details
- Born: 6 June 1966 (age 60) Shkodër, Albania
- Party: Social Democratic Party (2017–present)
- Other political affiliations: Independent (2015–2017); Socialist Party (2005–2015)
- Spouse: Xhovana Doshi
- Children: 4
- Education: State University of Tetova

Tom Doshi (born 6 June 1966) is an Albanian businessman and politician. He is the chairman of the Social Democratic Party of Albania and a member of parliament for Shkodër County. Until 2015 he was a member of the Socialist Party. He was expelled from the Socialist Party after a dispute with Prime Minister Edi Rama. In 2017 he joined the Social Democratic Party instead and in 2020 he became its chairman. He led the party for the 2021 and 2025 parliamentary elections, winning 3 seats each time. Despite his previous dispute with Rama, the PSD cooperates with the Socialist Party in Parliament.

Allegations of corruption, electoral fraud and various criminal activities have been made against him in Albania, Australia and the United States. In April 2018, he and his family were barred from entering the United States on this basis.

== Biography ==
A scion of a prominent family from Kelmendi, Doshi spent his childhood in the village of Velipojë, 31 km northwest of Shkodër. He graduated in Law from the State University of Tetova. For some time Doshi lived in Australia where his four children were born.

After returning to Albania, Doshi conducted a series of manoeuvres in the business field acquiring various businesses, such as a milk processing plant and the biggest pharmaceutical company in the country.

== Politics ==
Doshi entered politics with the Socialist Party of Albania under the leadership of Fatos Nano in the legislature that began in 2005, and continued to stay in the Socialist Party even after the arrival of the new leader Edi Rama. During his years as a deputy, from 2005 to 2007, Doshi has served as a member of the Committee of Labour, Social Affairs and Health. Doshi is the chairman of the Social Democratic Party of Albania.

== Controversies ==
=== Assault on journalist ===
In March 2008 Tom Doshi was accused of assaulting the Balkan Investigative Reporting Network (BIRN) journalist Besar Likmeta in front of another MP. Likmeta was investigating the origin of Doshi's diploma.

=== Alleged murder plot ===
On March 2, 2015, Doshi was expelled from the Socialist Party's parliamentary group. The expulsion came after Doshi had filed harsh criticisms against Prime Minister Edi Rama, Defence Minister Saimir Tahiri and the Speaker of the Parliament Ilir Meta. Doshi commented: "Today Rama has a tutor called Ilir Meta, who has paid lek [money] and ordered to kill me and Mhill Fufi."

Days later, Doshi released the video of a private conversation between him and Durim Bani, the assassin paid to eliminate Doshi. In the video Bani states that "there are over 200,000 euros for the head of Doshi" and that "the killers will have the support of the government and Ilir Meta."

=== Investigation in Australia ===
OCCRP (Investigative Journalists Group) claims that Doshi is suspected of leading an organized criminal group implicated in money laundering, drug trafficking, and other offenses in Australia, according to assessment by the Australian Criminal Intelligence Commission (ACIC)

== Sanctions ==
On 16 April 2018, Doshi and his family members were banned from entering the United States of America.

The Department (of State) is publicly designating Albanian Member of Parliament Mr. Tom Doshi [...] due to his involvement in significant corruption. [...] the Department is also publicly designating Mr. Doshi’s spouse, Xhovana Doshi, his adult daughter, Briana Doshi, his adult son, James Doshi, and his minor children.

— U.S Department of State
