= Legality Movement Party =

Political party in Albania

Legality Movement Party Partia Lëvizja e Legalitetit
- Chairman: Shpëtim Axhami
- Secretary-General: Lurian Mena
- Deputy Leader: Edmond Guri
- National Council Leader: Fatmir Haveriku
- Founded: 24–25 November 1962
- Registered: 20 February 1992
- Preceded by: Legality Movement
- Headquarters: Rruga Muhamet Gjollesha, Tirana
- Newspaper: Gazeta Atdheu
- Youth wing: PLL Youth Forum (Leader: Martin Toro)
- Women Wing: Legalist Women's Forum (Leader: Anila Biba)
- Diaspora Wing: Legalist Diaspora (Leader: Sulejman Gjana)
- Ideology: Conservatism; Constitutional monarchism; Albanian nationalism
- Political position: Right-wing
- National affiliation: Union for Victory (2001–2005); Alliance for a Magnificent Albania (since 2025)
- International affiliation: International Monarchist Conference
- Colors: Yellow, Red
- Slogan: Atdheu mbi të gjitha ('Homeland above all')
- Parliament: 1 / 140
- Council seats: 22 / 1,613

Party flag

Website
- www.legaliteti.al

The Legality Movement Party (Albanian: Partia Lëvizja e Legalitetit, abbr. PLL) is a monarchist political party in Albania led by Shpëtim Axhami. It supports the restoration of the Albanian monarchy under the House of Zogu, with the house's current head Prince Leka crowned as king. The party has also been characterised as conservative and nationalist.

The PLL claims a direct continuity with the original Legality Movement active during World War II, as its founding members were former Legality Movement members or supporters. Exiled members of the Legality Movement held their first congress in exile in 1962, and the party was re-established in Albania in 1992 after the fall of communism in Albania.

== History ==
The PLL traces its roots back to the Legality Movement (1943–1944), a royalist political and paramilitary organisation active during World War II which sought to restore the House of Zogu to the Albanian throne. The 1924 in the PLL's logo is a reference to the 24 December 1924 counter-revolution of Zog I, which restored the king to his throne and deposed the government installed by the June Revolution earlier that year.

Former members of the Legality Movement held their first "congress in exile" from 24 to 25 November 1962, at the Sheraton-Atlantic Hotel in New York City, United States. They held nine more congresses in exile before the fall of communism in Albania and the legalisation of opposition parties in the country. Those former members and their supporters subsequently registered the Legality Movement Party as a political party on 20 February 1992.

The party contested its first parliamentary election in 1996, receiving 2.07 percent of the popular vote and no seats. In early elections held the following year, the party garnered 3.25 percent of the popular vote and won two seats.

In the 2001 parliamentary election, the PLL was part of the Union for Victory electoral coalition, which received 37% of the popular vote and won 46 seats.

The party returned to parliament with the election of one deputy in 2021. It joined the Alliance for a Great Albania electoral coalition in the lead up to the 2025 parliamentary election.

== Ideology and program ==
The PLL has been described as conservative, monarchist, and nationalist. A royalist party, the PLL advocates the establishment of a constitutional monarchy in Albania with Prince Leka (not to be confused with his father, Crown Prince Leka), the current head of the House of Zogu, crowned as King of the Albanians. However, the party's program states that this should be done only if a majority of Albanians vote for it in a referendum on the republic. Nonetheless, Cas Mudde, a Dutch political scientist specialising in political extremism and populism in Europe, describes the PLL as an "extreme-right monarchist party".

In its program, the party emphasises the rule of law, democratic institutions, and civil liberties, particularly freedom of speech, freedom of religion, and freedom of assembly. It supports the rights of ethnic minorities in Albania "on equal and reciprocal terms", the autonomy of trade unions, and the integration of the Albanian diaspora into domestic politics and society. The PLL maintains a strong anti-communist stance and seeks the legal recognition and support of former political prisoners of the socialist era. The party also supports a secular state.

== Leadership ==
The PLL is chaired by Shpetim Axhami, a former city councillor and educator during the 1990s and 2000s.

=== Leader of the Party ===
	Leader	Term of office	
1	Nuçi Kotta	24 November, 1962	20 July, 1965
2	Selim Damani	20 July, 1965	2 September, 1968
3	Fuad Myftija	2 September, 1968	30 May,1993
4	Guri Durollari	30 May, 1993	12 April, 1998
5	Ekrem Spahiu	12 April, 1998	24 November, 2013
6	Sulejman Gjana	24 November, 2013	25 November, 2017
7	Shpëtim Axhami	25 November, 2017	incumbent

=== Internal leadership ===
- Chairman - Shpetim Axhami
- General Secretary - Lurian Mena
- Deputy Chairman - Edmond Guri
- National Council Leader - Fatmir Haveriku
- Political Secretary - Nazif Sula
- Property and land Secretary - Ferit Nela
- Diaspora Secretary - Sulejman Gjana
- Urban Development Secretary - Arben Kollçaku
- Secretary of Electoral Human Resources - Afrim Kice
- Finance Secretary - Eda Shehu
- Justice Secretary - Hajredin Janina

== International relations ==
The PLL is a member of the International Monarchist Conference.

== Election results ==
PLL parliamentary election results
Election	Votes	%	Seats	+/–	Outcome
1996	34,019	2.07 (#6)	0 / 140	New	Extraparliamentary opposition
1997	42,567	3.25 (#3)	2 / 140	▲2	Opposition
2001	Part of the UV coalition		5 / 140	▲3	Opposition
2005	Did not participate		0 / 140	▼5	Opposition
2009	10,711	0.71 (#)	0 / 140		Extraparliamentary opposition
2013	6,089	0.35 (#)	0 / 140	0	Extraparliamentary opposition
2017	Did not participate		0 / 140	0	Extraparliamentary opposition
2021	Part of PD-AN		2 / 140	▲2	Opposition
2025	Part of ASHM		1 / 140	▼1	Opposition

== Members of Parliament ==
=== Current ===
Denisa Vata MP for Dibër, 2025–present

=== Former ===
- Guri Durollari MP for Korçë, 1997–2001
- Behri Kollçaku MP for Berat, 2001–2005, later on April, 2021 – May, 2021
- Sadedin Balla MP for Elbasan, 2001–2005
- Athem (Et’hem) Fejzollari MP, 2001–2005
- Sali Shehu MP for Tirana, 2001–2009
- Ekrem Spahiu MP for Dibër, 2001–2013
- Andia Ulliri MP for Durrës, 2021–2025
- Petrit Doda MP for Tirana, 2021–2025

== Councillors ==
- Plarent Anamali – Shkoder
- Bajo Bajro – Kukes
- Abdulla Jupa – Has
- Vjollca Perbati – Tropoje
- Klarisa Balliu – Peshkopi
- Elker Durici – Bulqize
- Emanuel Perjaku – Lezhe
- Ilir Myrta – Kurbin
- Nazif Sulaj – Kamez
- Sokol Gosa – Rrogozhine
- Erion Bano – Lushnje
- Sahit Ibrahimaj Divjake
- Perparim Benga – Mallakaster
- Edmond Guri – Gramsh
- Gazmira Frakulli – Cerrik
- Ismail Paja – Belsh
- Libeta Beshir – Belsh
- Armand Tatazi – Permet
- Oliver Mulla – Devoll
- Jolio Dine – Sarande
- Anjeza Dike – Sarande
- Enio Selmani – Konispol

== See also ==
- Eqerem Spahia
- Skënder Zogu
- Albanian Democratic Monarchist Movement Party
