= 1996 Albanian parliamentary election =

National Election

← 1992	26 May 1996 (first round); 2 June 1996 (second round)	1997 →
- All 140 seats in People's Assembly; 71 seats needed for a majority
- Turnout: 89.08%
Party	Leader	Vote %	Seats	+/–
PD	Tritan Shehu	55.53	122	+30
PS	Fatos Nano	20.37	10	−28
PR	Sabri Godo	5.74	3	+2
PBK	Abas Ermenji	4.97	2	New
PBDNJ	Vasil Melo	4.04	3	+1
This lists parties that won seats. See the complete results below.
Prime Minister before	Prime Minister after
Aleksandër Meksi; PD	Aleksandër Meksi; PD

Parliamentary elections were held in Albania on 26 May 1996, with a second round of voting for 25 seats on 2 June. The result was a victory for the ruling Democratic Party of Albania, which won 122 of the 140 seats. Voter turnout was 89.1%.

On the day of the first round of voting, six opposition parties led by the Socialist Party of Albania withdrew from the election, accusing the Democratic Party of intimidation. International observers noted that the elections were marred by "a number of irregularities and technical shortcomings" and concluded that the election "did not meet international standards for free and fair elections", nor the standards of Albanian law. After the first round results were released on 29 May, the Socialist Party of Albania announced that they would not take up their seats in the National Assembly. Almost all opposition parties boycotted the second round as a result.

== Results ==
Party	Votes	%	Seats	+/–
Democratic Party of Albania	914,218	55.53	122	+30
Socialist Party of Albania	335,402	20.37	10	–28
Republican Party of Albania	94,567	5.74	3	+2
Albanian National Front Party	81,822	4.97	2	New
Unity for Human Rights Party	66,529	4.04	3	+1
Legality Movement Party	34,019	2.07	0	–
Social Democratic Union	32,430	1.97	0	New
Democratic Alliance	25,679	1.56	0	New
Social Democratic Party of Albania	25,019	1.52	0	–7
Demochristian Party of Albania	21,068	1.28	0	New
Albanian Democratic Union Party	11,789	0.72	0	New
National Unity Party	3,939	0.24	0	–
Total	1,646,481	100.00	140	0
Valid votes	1,646,481	83.86		
Invalid/blank votes	316,863	16.14		
Total votes	1,963,344	100.00		
Registered voters/turnout	2,204,002	89.08		
Source: Nohlen & Stöver, Vickers & Pettifer
