= 1997 Albanian parliamentary election =

- 29 June 1997 (first round); 6 July 1997 (second round)
- Turnout: 72.56% (▼16.52pp)
| Party | Leader | Vote % | Seats |
|---|---|---|---|
| PS | Fatos Nano | 52.75 | 100 |
| PD | Tritan Shehu | 25.70 | 27 |
| PLL | Ekrem Spahiu | 3.25 | 2 |
| PBDNJ | Vasil Melo | 2.84 | 4 |
| AD | Neritan Ceka | 2.72 | 2 |
| PSD | Skënder Gjinushi | 2.49 | 9 |
| PR | Sabri Godo | 2.41 | 1 |
| PBK | Abas Ermenji | 2.35 | 1 |
| PDK | Zef Bushati | 0.97 | 1 |
| DBSH | | – | 3 |
| Independents | – | – | 3 |
This lists parties that won seats. See the complete results below.
| Prime Minister before | Prime Minister after |
|---|---|
| Bashkim Fino; PS | Fatos Nano; PS |

Early parliamentary elections were held in Albania on 29 June 1997 alongside a simultaneous referendum on restoring the monarchy, with a second round of voting for 32 seats on 6 July. The elections were called as a response to the 1997 Albanian civil unrest. The result was an overwhelming victory for the opposition Socialist Party of Albania, which won 100 of the 151 seats. Voter turnout was 72.6%.

== Results ==
| Party | Proportional | | | Constituency | | | Total seats |
| Party | Votes | % | Seats | Votes | % | Seats | Total seats |
|---|---|---|---|---|---|---|---|
| Socialist Party of Albania | 690,003 | 52.75 | 22 | | | 78 | 100 |
| Democratic Party of Albania | 336,167 | 25.70 | 11 | | | 16 | 27 |
| Legality Movement Party | 42,567 | 3.25 | 2 | | | 0 | 2 |
| Unity for Human Rights Party | 37,191 | 2.84 | 1 | | | 3 | 4 |
| Democratic Alliance Party | 35,598 | 2.72 | 1 | | | 1 | 2 |
| Social Democratic Party of Albania | 32,537 | 2.49 | 1 | | | 8 | 9 |
| Republican Party of Albania | 31,573 | 2.41 | 1 | | | 0 | 1 |
| Albanian National Front Party | 30,693 | 2.35 | 1 | | | 0 | 1 |
| Demochristian Party of Albania | 12,728 | 0.97 | 0 | | | 1 | 1 |
| Democratic Union Party | 10,997 | 0.84 | 0 | | | | 0 |
| Social Democratic Union Party | 10,457 | 0.80 | 0 | | | | 0 |
| Agrarian Party | 10,421 | 0.80 | 0 | | | 1 | 1 |
| Right Democratic Party | 9,837 | 0.75 | 0 | | | | 0 |
| Movement for Democracy Party | 3,802 | 0.29 | 0 | | | | 0 |
| National Unity Party | 3,784 | 0.29 | 0 | | | 1 | 1 |
| Christian Democratic Union Party | 3,734 | 0.29 | 0 | | | | 0 |
| Conservative Party | 3,400 | 0.26 | 0 | | | | 0 |
| National League Party | 1,865 | 0.14 | 0 | | | | 0 |
| Democratic Progress Party | 669 | 0.05 | 0 | | | | 0 |
| Albanian United Right | | | | | | 3 | 3 |
| Independents | | | | | | 3 | 3 |
| Total | 1,308,023 | 100.00 | 40 | | | 115 | 155 |
| Valid votes | 1,308,023 | 92.58 | | | | | |
| Invalid/blank votes | 104,906 | 7.42 | | | | | |
| Total votes | 1,412,929 | 100.00 | | | | | |
| Registered voters/turnout | 1,947,235 | 72.56 | | | | | |
Source: Nohlen & Stöver, IFES
