= Social Democracy Party of Albania =

Political party in Albania

Social Democracy Party of Albania Partia Demokracia Sociale e Shqipërisë
- Leader: Paskal Milo
- Founded: 2003
- Split from: Social Democratic Party of Albania
- Headquarters: Tirana
- Ideology: Social democracy
- Political position: Centre-left
- Colours: Red, Green
- Council seats: 18 / 1,613

Website
- pds.al

The Social Democracy Party of Albania (Albanian: Partia Demokracia Sociale e Shqipërisë) is a social-democratic Albanian political party. It was established in 2003. In the July 2005 elections it won two seats in Parliament. Its leader is Paskal Milo.

At the 2009 elections it won 0.68 percent. It won 2,473 votes (0.16%) in the 2017 elections.
