= Socialist Alliance =

Socialist Alliance may refer to:

- Albanian Socialist Alliance Party
- Alternative Socialist Alliance - Independents (in Bulgaria)
- Scottish Socialist Alliance
- Socialist Alliance (Australia)
- Socialist Alliance (Burkina Faso)
- Socialist Alliance (England)
- Samajwadi Alliance (in India)
- Socialist Alliance (Mexico)
- Socialist Alliance (Sri Lanka)
- Socialist Alliance Party (in Romania)
- Socialist Alliance of Working People of Yugoslavia
- Socialist Environmental Alliance (in Northern Ireland)
- Socialist Labour Alliance (in Ireland)
- Socialist Popular Alliance Party (in Egypt)
- Socialist Trade and Labor Alliance (in the United States)
- Socialist Youth Alliance (in Portugal)
- Welsh Socialist Alliance
- Young Socialist Alliance (in the United States)

== See also ==
- Anti-Capitalist Alliance
