= Ekrem Spahiu =

Albanian politician

Chairman of the Legality Movement Party
- In office 12 April, 1998 – 24 November, 2013
- Preceded by: Guri Durollari
- Succeeded by: Sulejman Gjana

Personal details
- Born: 18 April, 1960 Albania
- Party: Legality Movement Party
- Occupation: Politician

Ekrem Spahiu (born 18 April 1960) was a Member of the Albanian Parliament in XVIth legislature (from 2001). Eqerem Spahia was arrested for "organising armed uprising, participating in it and violating institutions" after an armed protest near the parliament building that aimed to topple the Nano government and bring to power Crown Prince Leka, son of Zog of Albania, in September 1998.

Ekrem Spahiu made the most disputed case of homophobia and hate speech in Albania as he stated in 2012 to a local newspaper: “What remains to be done is to beat them up with a stick. If you don't understand this, I can explain it: to beat them with a rubber stick”. The EU Delegation in Tirana, Human Rights Watch, Amnesty International and ILGA Europe, the local and international media covered and condemned this statement, even Prime Minister Sali Berisha condemned it publicly, but the Commissioner failed to follow up the case.

== See also ==
- Politics of Albania
