= Institute for the Integration of Former Political Victims =

- Instituti i Integrimit për Ish të Përndjekurit Politikë
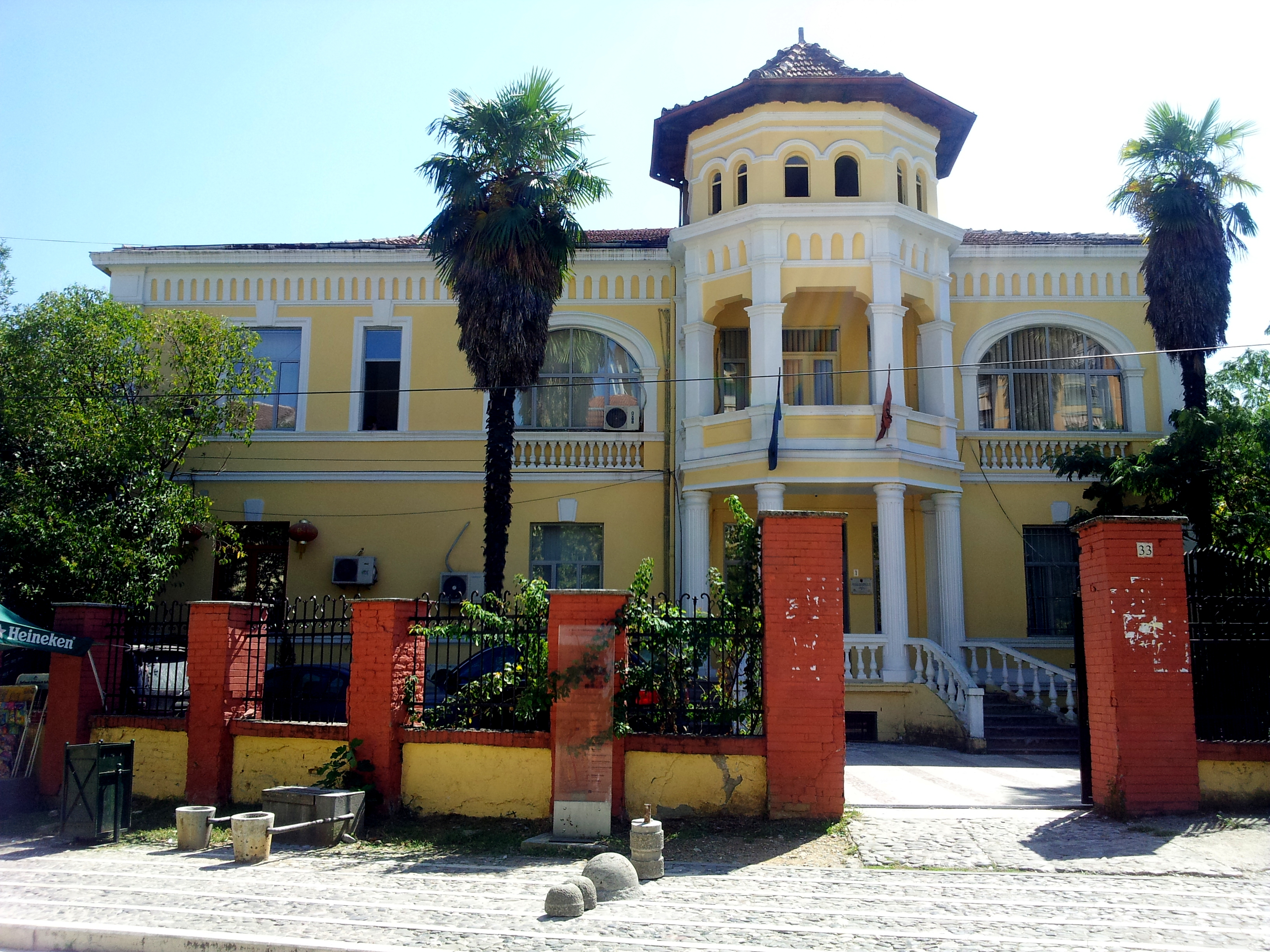
- Official headquarters

Government agency overview
- Formed: 1 October 1997 (28 years ago)
- Jurisdiction: Council of Ministers
- Headquarters: Rruga “Xhorxh W. Bush”, Vila 2-katëshe nr.7, Tirana, Albania
- Minister responsible: Ogerta Manastirliu, Minister of Health and Social Protection
- Government agency executive: Bilal Kola, Director General
- Website: ishperndjekurit.gov.al

The Institute for the Integration of Former Political Victims (Albanian: Instituti i Integrimit për Ish të Përndjekurit Politikë – IIPP) is a budgetary entity of the Albanian government, designated with the granting of financial compensation by the state, to former political prisoners of the communist regime and to the family members of those executed or interned at concentration camps, as an affirmation from the state in acknowledging the crimes committed by the previous totalitarian system.

== Overview ==
The creation of a central state institution for the compensation and rehabilitation of all citizens unjustly accused and convicted by the previous regime, came as a priority need of the government to ensure with material and moral support the full integration into society for the former persecuted class.

In January 1993, a committee of former convicts and political prisoners was established in Albania. During this time period, Law no. 7748 dated 29.07.1993 "On the Status of Former Convicts and the Politically Persecuted by the Communist System" was approved, followed by Decision no. 184 dated 04.05.1994 "On the granting of Financial Compensation to Former Convicts and the Politically Persecuted by the Communist System". In implementation of this law and the council of minister's decision, around 120 officials were assigned throughout all districts and prefectures of the country, to conduct voluminous work in collecting the proper documentation that was to be used as evidence in the granting of Status and Property Compensation.

From January 1995 until October 1997, the committee was transformed into a General Directorate under the supervision of the Ministry of Labor and Social Affairs. IIPP as an institution was officially regulated by Law no. 8246, dated 1.10.1997.

The method of financial compensation towards ex-convicts and the politically persecuted, was processed mainly via the issuance of securities from the treasury and only a small percentage of cases would be compensated in cash.

In January 1998, the institution came under the umbrella of the Ministry of Justice and from January 1, 2014, it became part of the Ministry of Social Welfare and Youth. Presently, IIPP is a subordinate institution of the Ministry of Health and Social Protection.
