= Arben Imami =

Albanian politician and actor

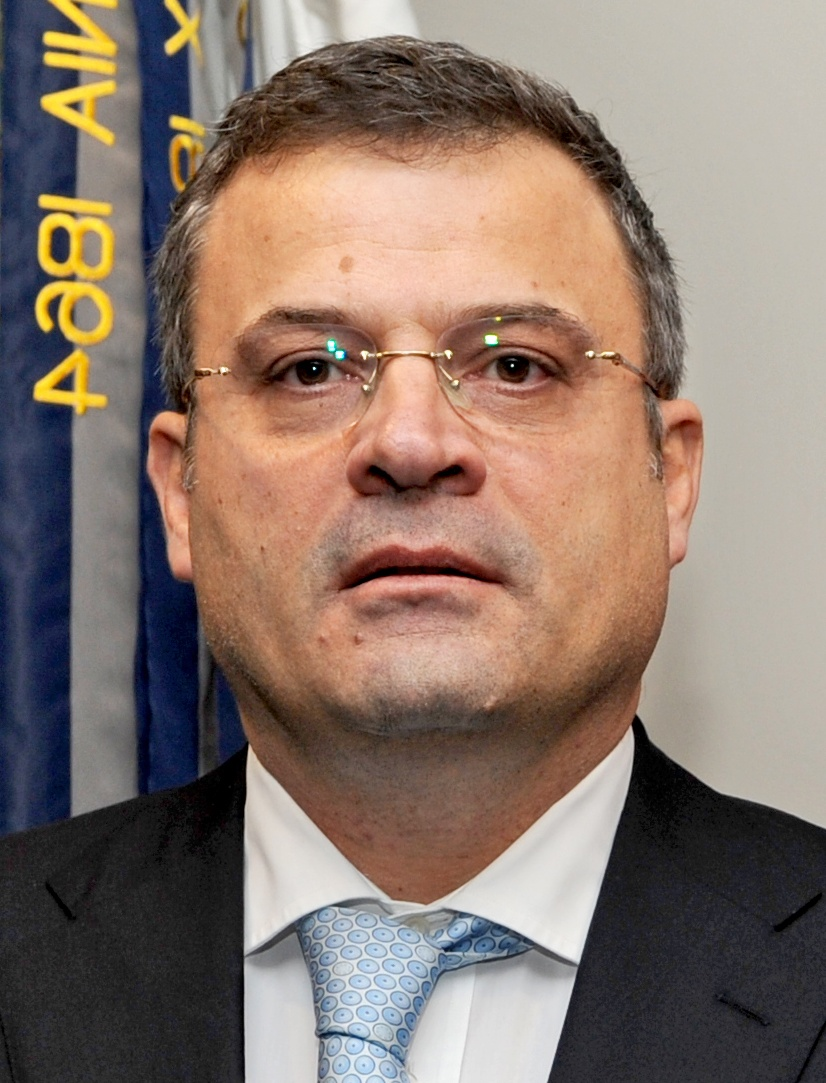
- Arben Imami during a visit to The Pentagon in 2009

Member of the Albanian parliament
- In office 1991–2017

32nd Defence Minister of Albania
- In office 17 September 2009 – 15 September 2013
- Prime Minister: Sali Berisha
- Preceded by: Gazmend Oketa
- Succeeded by: Mimi Kodheli

Personal details
- Born: Arben Fahri Imami; 21 January 1958 (age 68) Tirana, People's Republic of Albania (now Albania)
- Party: Democratic Party
- Other political affiliations: Democratic Alliance Party (1996-2005)
- Education: Academy of Arts of Tirana

Arben Fahri Imami (born 21 January 1958) is an Albanian politician and former actor. He served as the minister of defense between 2009 and 2013.

== Biography ==
Imami was born in Tirana, and attended the High Institute of Arts of Tirana between 1977 and 1981. Later he was a professor at the Academy of Arts of Tirana. He is one of the founders of the Democratic Party of Albania in 1990, and has been elected a Member of Parliament in five legislatures.

Political posts Imami has held include minister of legislative reform and parliament relations from 1997 to 1999, minister of justice from 2000 to 2001, minister of local government and decentralization from 2000 to February 2002, and from 2005 to 2009 he was the chief of cabinet of the prime minister.

During 1999 and 2000, he had a fellowship at the School of Foreign Service of Georgetown University in Washington, D.C.

He has acted in three films, Face to Face (1979) "Në çdo stinë" (1980) and (Vajzat me kordele te kuqe) Te shoh ne sy (1986)

== See also ==
- 1997 rebellion in Albania
