= Democratic Alliance Party (Albania) =

Democratic Alliance Party Partia Aleanca Demokratike
- Leader: Eduart Abazi
- Founded: 1992
- Split from: Democratic Party of Albania
- Headquarters: Tirana
- Ideology: Liberalism
- Political position: Center
- Colours: White, Blue
- National Assembly: 0 / 140
- Municipality: 0 / 61
- Council Seats: 10 / 1,613

Website
- aleanca.integrimi.org

The Democratic Alliance Party (Albanian: Partia Aleanca Demokratike) is a liberal political party in Albania. The party was formed in 1992 by Neritan Ceka and other dissidents of the Democratic Party of Albania. They opposed the leadership of the party's leader Sali Berisha.

== History ==
PAD was founded in early 1992 by including two of the original founders Gramoz Pashko and Arben Imami. The reason for the split is still disputed by the principals involved. Although the Democratic Alliance Party had six deputies in the 23rd Legislature of Albania, the number needed to form a parliamentary group, they were denied such recognition by the leadership of parliament. The Democratic Alliance Party blamed the government for an incident that occurred in January 1994, when the leader of the Shkoder branch of the party was shot and killed after a rally.

The founders of the Democratic Alliance, formed the party on the right side of the political spectrum, where some of the former founders of the Democratic Party, its former deputies, as well as the December students. Over time, it moved from the right side towards the centre and in 2008, it presented itself as a liberal party. The Democratic Alliance Party became part of a socialist led government in 1997. In the June 2001 elections it received 2.4% of the vote and three members of parliament. The party continued in government. In the elections in July 2005 it won 3 seats in Parliament. Although they opposed Sali Berisha. In the 2009 election they Joined the Democratic Party and its alliance. Since 2009 the Democratic Alliance has been Extra-parliamentary opposition. In 2013 Party founder Neritan Ceka had been succeed by Eduart Abazi. The Democratic Alliance since 2015 had switched away from the Democratic party and rejoined the Socialist Party's Alliance.

== MPS ==
Deputies from 1997-2001
Neritan Ceka
Preç Zogaj
Deputies from 2001-2005
Arben Imami
Neritan Ceka
Preç Zogaj
Deputies from 2005-2009
Neritan Ceka
Pirro Lutaj
Pashko Ujka

== Election results ==
Election	Votes	%	Seats	+/–	Government
1996	25,679	1.52 (#8)	0 / 140	▼6	Extraparliamentary opposition
1997	35,598	2.72 (#5)	2 / 140	▲2	Coalition
2001	34,262	2.61 (#6)	3 / 140	▲1	Coalition
2005	65,093	4.76 (#8)	3 / 140	0	Opposition
2009	4,682	0.31 (#)	0 / 140	▼3	Extraparliamentary opposition
2013	1,384	0.08 (#)	0 / 140	0	Extraparliamentary opposition
2017	547	0.03 (#)	0 / 140	0	Extraparliamentary opposition
