= Albanian National Reconciliation Party =

Political party in Albania

- Leader: Spartak Dobi
- Founded: 1998

Albanian National Reconciliation Party (in Albanian: Partia e Pajtimit Kombëtar Shqiptar) is a political party in Albania, led by Spartak Dobi. The party was founded in 1998. It had 0.02% of the votes in the National Lower House Elections in 2001.
