= Albanian Socialist Alliance Party =

Political party in Albania

- Leader: Rasim Mulgeci
- Ideology: Socialism
- Political position: Left-wing

Albanian Socialist Alliance Party (in Albanian: Partia Aleanca Socialiste Shqiptare, abbreviated PASSH) is a political party in Albania. It is led by Rasim Mulgeci.

PASSH took part in the 2005 parliamentary elections. PASSH received 0.5% of the votes on the proportional list. In the single-member constituency Zone 36 in Tirana, PASSH launched Andi Skender Kosturi against socialist leader Andis Harasani and received 119 votes (0.7%).
