= Alliance for Welfare and Solidarity =

Political party in Albania

- Leader: Koço Danaj

Party flag

Alliance for Welfare and Solidarity (in Albanian: Aleanca per Mirqenie dhe Solidaritet) is a political party in Albania. It is led by Koço Danaj.
