= Albanian Democratic Monarchist Movement Party =

- Leader: Guri Durollari
- Founded: 2004; 22 years ago
- Ideology: Monarchism; Royalism

Albanian Democratic Monarchist Movement Party (Albanian: Partia Lëvizja Monarkiste Demokrate Shqiptare) is a political party in Albania led by Guri Durollari. The party contested the 2005 parliamentary elections, and got around 0.1% of the votes.

== See also ==
- Legality Movement Party
