= Albanian Party of Democratic Reforms =

Political party in Albania

- Leader: Skender Halili
- Merged into: Democratic Movement for Integration

Albanian Party of Democratic Reforms (in Albanian: Partia e Reformave Demokratike Shqiptare) is a political party in Albania led by Skender Halili.

PRDSH is part of the coalition Democratic Movement for Integration. Halili is the leader of the coalition.
