= Paskal Milo =

Albanian historian and politician

Paskal Milo (born 22 February 1949) is an Albanian historian, politician, and leader of the Social Democracy Party of Albania. He has also been a member of the Albanian Parliament since 1992, and a professor of Albanian and Foreign literature. Milo has held various posts under the Albanian government in the late 1990s and early 2000s, notably that of Foreign Minister.

Milo was born in Palasë, a village of the Himarë municipality, Vlorë County. He graduated in the University of Tirana and holds a PhD degree. After the post of Foreign Minister of Albania, he has been a Minister for the European Integration of Albania in 2001–2002.
