= Albanian National Security Party =

Political party in Albania

Albanian National Security Party (in Albanian: Partia e Sigurisë Kombëtare Shqiptare) is a political party in Albania, led by Haxhi Bardhi. PSKSH contested the 2005 parliamentary elections. The party gathered less than 0.05% of the votes on the proportional list.
