= Communist Party of Albania 8 November =

- Leader: Preng Çuni
- Ideology: Communism
- Political position: Far-left

Communist Party of Albania 8 November (in Albanian: Partia Komuniste e Shqipërisë 8 Nëntori) is a political party in Albania. It is led by Preng Çuni.

In the 2007 municipal elections, PKSH 8 Nëntori won one seat in three municipalities; Cërrik, Tunja and Balldren i Ri.

In the 2013 elections, PKSH 8 Nëntori, supporting the coalition of Edi Rama, got 1404 votes nationwide (approx. 0,08%).
