= Social Democratic Party of Albania =

Albanian political party

Social Democratic Party of Albania Partia Socialdemokrate e Shqipërisë
- Abbreviation: PSD; PSDSH
- Leader: Tom Doshi
- Founder: Skënder Gjinushi
- Founded: March 1991
- Preceded by: Party of Labour of Albania
- Headquarters: Rr. Hoxha Tasim, nr. 187/1, Tirana
- Ideology: Social democracy; Pro-Europeanism
- Political position: Centre-left
- International affiliation: Socialist International (1992–2014)
- Colours: Green and red
- National Assembly: 3 / 140
- Council Seats: 116 / 1,613

Website
- psd.al

Former party logo

The Social Democratic Party of Albania (Albanian: Partia Socialdemokrate e Shqipërisë, PSD or PSDSH) is a minor social democratic political party in Albania. Its founder is Skënder Gjinushi, a former Minister of Education (1987–1991) and Speaker of Parliament (1997–2001). Its current chairman is Deputy Tom Doshi.

== History ==
The PSD was formed in March 1991 by former members of the Party of Labour of Albania who embraced social democracy, and was admitted into the Socialist International at its XIX congress in 1992. The party placed third in the 1992 parliamentary election, winning seven seats. It won only 1.52% and no seats in the 1996 election, but contested the 1997 election in an alliance with the Socialist Party, with the PSD winning nine seats.

In the 2001 elections the party was reduced to four seats competing independently. The 2005 elections saw the party increase its representation back to seven seats. For the 2009 election it was part of the "Unification for Changes" alliance with the Socialist Party, but received just 1.8% of the national vote and lost all its seats. In the 2017 election it returned to parliament with one seat. The 2021 election saw the party win three seats which it retained at the 2025 election.

The party's political base is in the north of the country, specifically Shkodër and Kukës counties. In the 2025 parliamentary election the party won 16% of the vote in Shkodër and 13% in Kukës, its two strongest performances. Social Democrat Edmond Ndou holds the office of Chairman of the Shkodër County Council.

== Chairman of the Social Democratic Party of Albania ==
- Skënder Gjinushi (March 1991 – 17 December 2020)
- Tom Doshi (17 December 2020 – present)

== Election results ==
=== Parliament ===
Election	Leader	Votes	%	Seats	+/–	Rank	Status
1992	Skënder Gjinushi	73,820	4.04	7 / 140		3rd	Opposition
1996	Skënder Gjinushi	25,019	1.52	0 / 140	▼7	▼8th	Extra-parliamentary
1997 (Note: In coalition with PS)	Skënder Gjinushi	245,181	17.35	9 / 140	▲9	▲3rd	Coalition
2001	Skënder Gjinushi	48,911	3.65	4 / 140	▼5	▼4th	Coalition
2005 (Note: Compensatory)	Skënder Gjinushi	174,103	12.74	7 / 140	▲3	4th	Opposition
2009	Skënder Gjinushi	26,700	1.76	0 / 140	▼7	▼5th	Extra-parliamentary
2013	Skënder Gjinushi	10,220	0.59	0 / 140	0	▼9th	Extra-parliamentary
2017	Skënder Gjinushi	14,993	0.95	1 / 140	▲1	▲5th	Support
2021	Tom Doshi	35,477	2.25	3 / 140	▲2	▲4th	Support
2025	Tom Doshi	49,890	3.10	3 / 140	0	4th	Support
