= 1992 Albanian parliamentary election =

National election

- 22 March 1992 (first round); 29 March 1992 (second round)
- All 140 seats in People's Assembly; 71 seats needed for a majority
Party	Leader	Vote %	Seats	+/–
PD	Sali Berisha	57.61	92	+17
PS	Fatos Nano	23.87	38	−131
PSD	Skënder Gjinushi	4.06	7	New
PR	Sabri Godo	2.89	1	+1
PBDNJ	Vasil Melo	2.69	2	−3
This lists parties that won seats. See the complete results below.
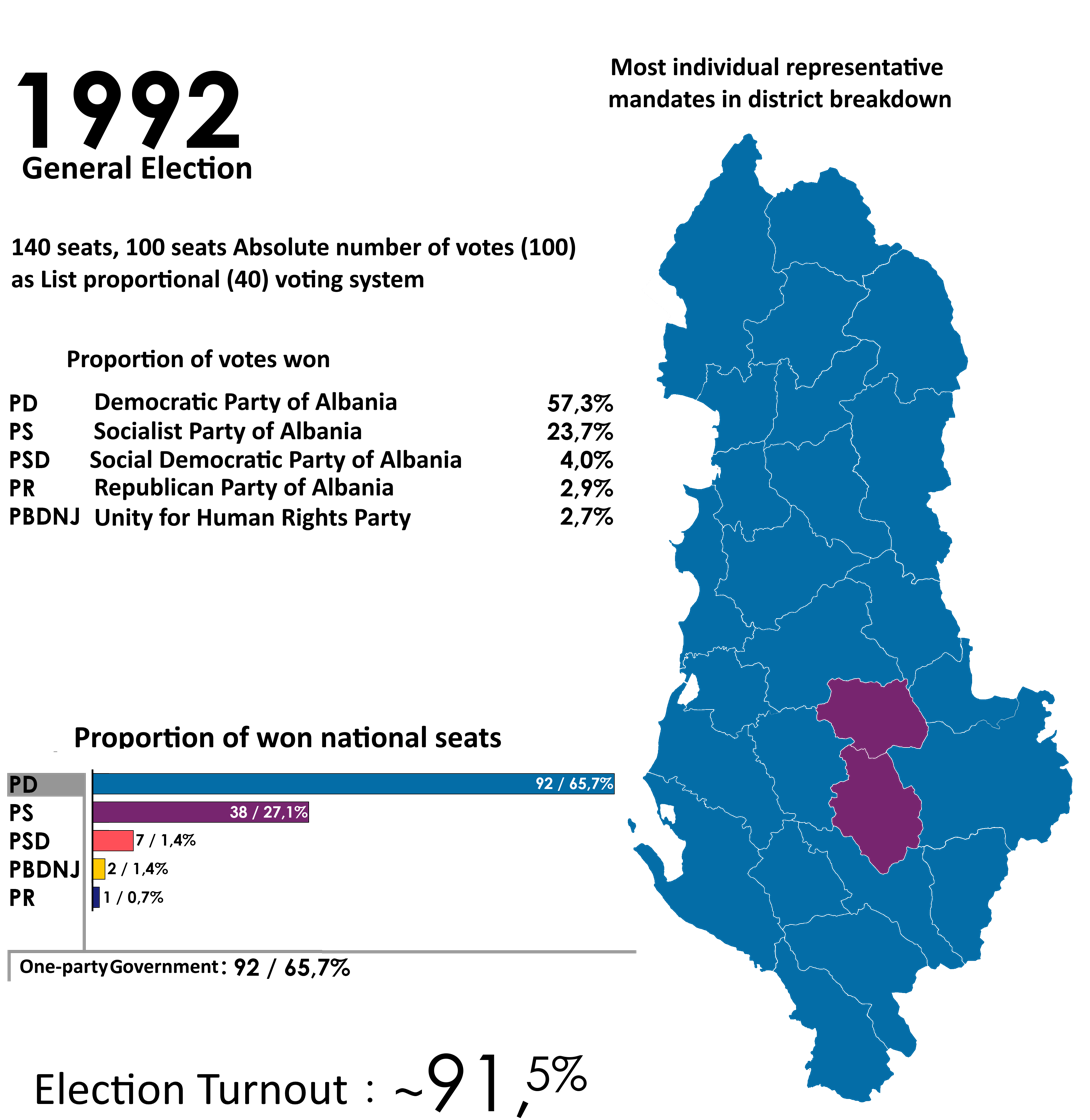
Results by district
Prime Minister before	Prime Minister after
Vilson Ahmeti; PS	Aleksandër Meksi; PD

Parliamentary elections were held in Albania on 22 March 1992, with a second round of voting for eleven seats on 29 March. The result was a victory for the opposition Democratic Party of Albania, which won 92 of the 140 seats. After the elections Aleksandër Meksi became prime minister and Sali Berisha became president.

== Background ==
Amid the economic crisis and increasing social destabilization that accompanied Albania's transition from a one-party communist regime led by the Party of Labour to a multi-party representative democracy, the March 1991 parliamentary elections resulted in a political stalemate caused by the split of the Albanian electorate: while the urban population, constituting a minority of the electorate, actively voted for opposition parties (primarily for the newly formed center-right Democratic Party), the rural population, constituting the majority of the electorate, continued to remain loyal to the ruling party, which led to the victory of the communists with an absolute majority.

The opposition did not readily accept the election results and from the outset called for a series of protests and strikes against the elected government, receiving support from independent trade unions who demanded a 50% increase in wages, union control over working conditions and the bringing to justice of those responsible for the Shkodra massacre on 2 April. While the opposition in parliament boycotted votes on projects proposed by the communist government, mass protests and strikes virtually paralyzed the country. Under these conditions, the People's Assembly yielded to the demands of the strikers, deciding to form a new government and hold early elections for a parliament reduced to 140 seats. On 5 June, the cabinet of Fatos Nano was replaced by the “national stability Government” led by Ylli Bufi, also a representative of the reformist wing. New elections were scheduled for March next year. On 10 December Bufi was replaced at the head of the government by the non-partisan Vilson Ahmeti, who was considered the “technical prime minister” for the period before early elections.

== Campaign ==
The ruling Party of Labour, under the leadership of then Prime Minister Fatos Nano, who represented the reformist wing of the party, abandoned communist ideology and changed its name to the Socialist Party of Albania, proclaiming a course towards building democracy and a market economy. The country, in turn, also changed its official name: after eliminating the adjectives Socialist and People's, it officially became the Republic of Albania. Nano's government sought to implement structural reforms that would gradually move the country toward capitalism while allowing ex-communists to retain power.

American officials supported the Democratic Party, with US Ambassador William Rierson appearing at their rallies. In response, the Socialist Party accused the Americans of providing "illegitimate support".

== Results ==
Party	Votes	%	Seats	+/–
Democratic Party of Albania	1,046,193	57.61	92	+17
Socialist Party of Albania	433,602	23.87	38	–131
Social Democratic Party of Albania	73,820	4.06	7	New
Republican Party of Albania	52,477	2.89	1	+1
Unity for Human Rights Party	48,923	2.69	2	–3
Other parties	161,127	8.87	0	–
Total	1,816,142	100.00	140	–110
Registered voters/turnout	2,021,169	–		
Source: Nohlen & Stöver

== Aftermath ==
The Democratic Party under Sali Berisha became the first non-socialist party to rule Albania since the end of World War II. Privatization programs were started and Albania opened towards the West: it signed the Partnership for Peace agreement in 1994, and became a member of the Council of Europe in 1995. However, economic mismanagement and the rapid proliferation of pyramid schemes shook faith in the new government. The schemes began failing in December 1996 and demonstrators took to the streets accusing the government of having stolen the money. In the midst of the crisis, which had escalated into civil unrest, Berisha was re-elected president for a second five-year term on 3 March 1997 by a parliament totally controlled by the Democratic Party. To try and put a stop to the civil strife, new elections were held in June 1997, which saw an overwhelming victory for the Socialist Party.
