= Neritan Ceka =

Albanian archaeologist and politician (born 1941)

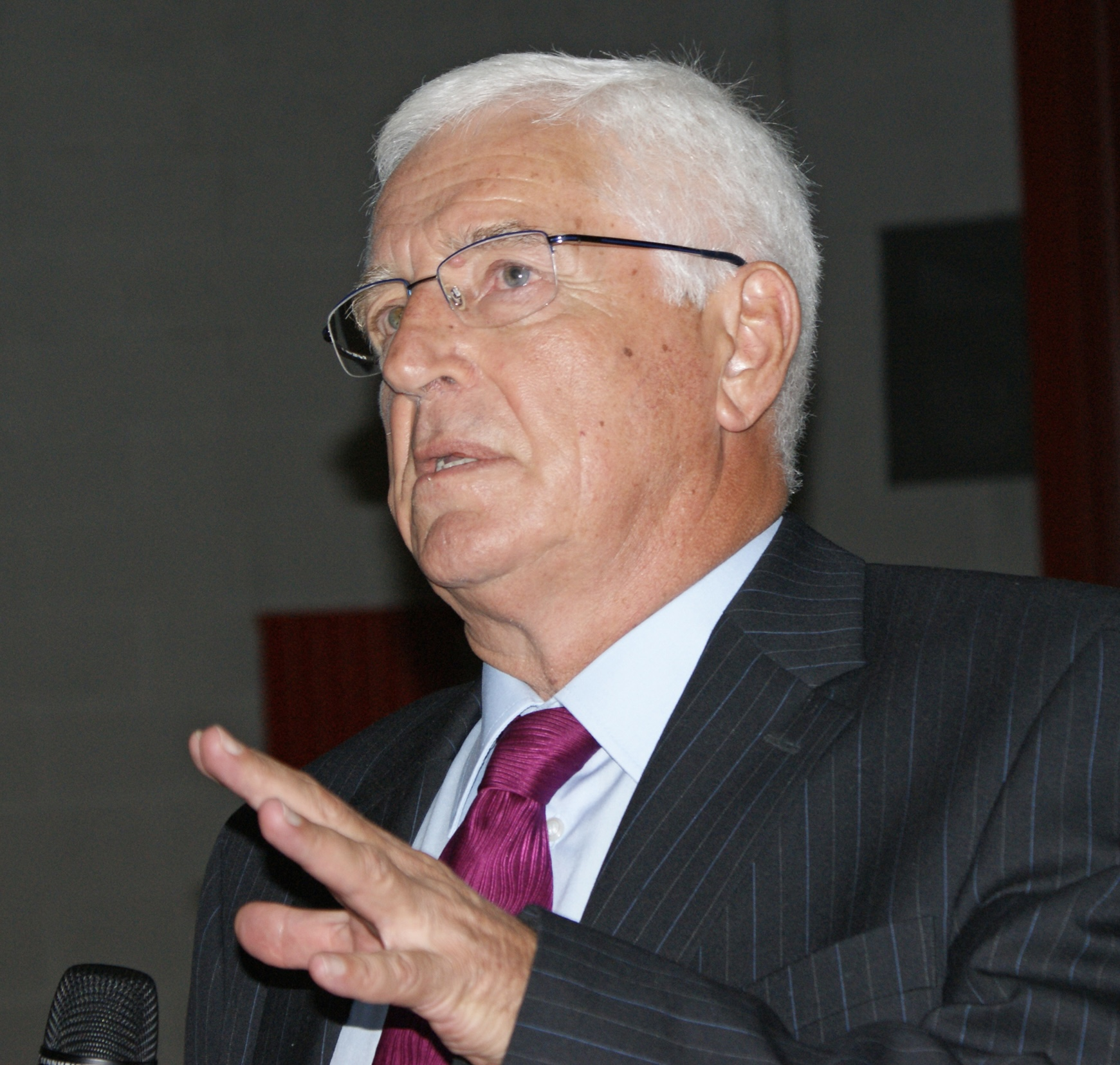
- Neritan Ceka in 2012, at a conference in Geneva, Switzerland.

48th Minister of Internal Affairs
- In office 27 July 1997 – 18 April 1998
- President: Rexhep Meidani
- Prime Minister: Fatos Nano
- Preceded by: Ali Kazazi
- Succeeded by: Perikli Teta

Personal details
- Born: 11 February 1941 (age 85) Tirana, Albania
- Occupation: Archaeologist, academic, politician
- Known for: Archaeological research in Albania; political activity in the 1990s

Neritan Ceka (Albanian: [nɛɾiˈtan ˈtsɛka]; born 11 February 1941) is an Albanian archaeologist, academic and former politician. He is known for his extensive archaeological research in Albania, his role as a founding member of the Democratic Party and for serving as Minister of Internal Affairs from 27 July 1997 to 18 April 1998, in the government of Prime Minister Fatos Nano.

== Early life and education ==
Neritan Ceka was born on 11 February 1941, in Tirana. He is the son of Hasan Ceka, a renowned archaeologist who greatly influenced his decision to pursue archaeology. He completed his secondary education at the Qemal Stafa High School and went on to further his studies at the University of Tirana, graduating with a degree in archaeology.

== Archaeological career ==
After graduation, Ceka dedicated himself to archaeological research, participating in and leading excavations at major ancient sites across Albania, including Apollonia, Butrint, Byllis and elsewhere. His work has focused on Illyrian, Greek and Roman periods, contributing to a deeper understanding of Albania’s ancient past. He has also served as professor of archaeology and director of the Archaeological Institute.

== Political career ==
Ceka was a founding member of the Democratic Party of Albania in the early 1990s, following the collapse of the communist regime. In 1992, after internal disagreements, he left the party and established his own political faction, the Democratic Alliance, a liberal political entity which later entered into a governing coalition with the Socialist Party. He served as Albania’s Minister of Internal Affairs from 27 July 1997 until 18 April 1998.

== Selected works ==
Ceka has published numerous books and scholarly works on classical archaeology and historic sites.

- Apollonia: History and Monuments (ISBN 99943-672-5-0)
- Arkeologjia: Greqia, Roma, Iliria with Muzafer Korkuti
- Buthrotum: Its History and Monuments (ISBN 99927-801-2-6)
- Butrint (ISBN 0-9535556-0-7)
- Byllis: Its History and Monuments with Skender Mucaj (ISBN 99943-672-7-7)
- Iliret (ISBN 99927-0-098-X)
