= Skënder Gjinushi =

Albanian politician and academic

President of the Academy of Sciences
- Incumbent
- Assumed office 2019
- Preceded by: Gudar Beqiraj

32nd Speaker of the Parliament of Albania
- In office 24 July 1997 – 4 September 2001
- Preceded by: Pjetër Arbnori
- Succeeded by: Namik Dokle

Chairman of the Social Democratic Party of Albania
- In office March 1991 – 17 December 2020
- Preceded by: Office established
- Succeeded by: Tom Doshi

Personal details
- Born: 24 December 1949 (age 76) Vlorë, People's Republic of Albania
- Party: Social Democratic Party of Albania
- Children: 2
- Education: University of Tirana

Skënder Gjinushi (born 24 December 1949 in Vlorë, Albania) is an Albanian politician and academic. He has served in several high-ranking positions in the Albanian government, including as Speaker of Parliament and Deputy Prime Minister. He founded the Social Democratic Party of Albania and served as its chairman from 1991 to 2019. He is currently serving as the president of the Academy of Sciences of Albania.

== Early life and academic career ==
Skënder Gjinushi was born 24 December 1949 in Vlorë. He was educated at a high school in Tirana, and graduated from the University of Tirana in 1972 with a degree in mathematics. He completed postgraduate studies at Pierre and Marie Curie University in France, earning a doctoral degree in functional analysis. He has published several articles in mathematics.

== Political career ==
Gjinushi was Minister of Education from 1987 to 1991, during Albania's communist regime. In 1991, after the fall of communism, he founded the Social Democratic Party of Albania (PSD), and served as the party's first chairman.

Gjinushi was elected to Parliament in the 1992 elections. He served as Speaker of Parliament from 1997 to 2001. He then had a stint as Deputy Prime Minister from 2001 to 2002, in the Meta II and Majko II governments. During this period, he also served as Minister of Labour and Social Affairs.

In 2000, Koha Jonë published an interview with Dhori Kule, a former secretary-general of the PSD. In the interview Kule accused PSD leaders of corruption and nepotism, and was particularly critical of Gjinushi. Gjinushi responded to the interview, which referred to him as a "dangerous mafioso in politics", by bringing libel charges against the reporter who conducted it. The case has been cited as an example of the Albanian government's failure to protect press freedoms.

== Return to academics ==
Gjinushi was elected president of the Academy of Sciences of Albania on 24 May 2019. This election was accused of being a political appointment by Prime Minister Edi Rama, who threatened to withhold funding if Gjinushi was not elected. For several years prior, Gjinushi had been a member of the Academy in violation of the law, which states that no one holding a political position may be a member. At a press conference immediately after his election was announced, Gjinushi sexually harassed a female journalist.

President of Albania Ilir Meta refused to approve Gjinushi's election, citing his leadership of the PSD while competing for the position. The day after Meta's statement, the Academy called his refusal "absolutely invalid". Consequently, Parliament passed a law stating that the Academy can override the president's veto, giving it the power to complete Gjinushi's nomination. Gjinushi was ultimately confirmed as president of the Academy.

As a result of his election, Gjinushi resigned from the PSD, and was replaced as party leader by Ëngjëll Bejtaj.

== Personal life ==
Gjinushi is married and has two children.
