= Sabri Godo =

Albanian writer, activist and politician (1929–2011)

- Born: 8 August 1929; Delvinë, Albania
- Died: 3 December 2011 (aged 82); Tirana, Albania
- Resting place: Tufine, Tirana, Albania
- Occupations: Writer; Screenwriter; Politician
- Known for: Founder and Chairman of the Republican Party of Albania; Honorary President and Chairman of the National Assembly of PR; Chair of the Foreign Affairs Committee co-chairman in drafting the New Constitution of the Republic of Albania in 1998
- Office: Leader of the Republican Party
- Predecessor: none
- Successor: Fatmir Mediu
- Political party: Republican Party of Albania
- Spouse: Nevin Godo (Vrioni)
- Children: Ermira Godo, Anila Godo

Sabri Godo (8 August 1929, Delvinë – 3 December 2011 Tiranë) was an Albanian writer, conservative politician and screenwriter. He came from a culture-loving family with deep rooted patriotic traditions. Being brought up in the Totaj family from his mother's side, Godo spent his youth in a literary and patriotic environment.

== Early life and education ==
Godo attended primary school in the city of his birth, Delvina, south Albania. Then he transferred to Tirana for high school, which was forced to interrupt during the third year after being actively involved in the anti-fascist war. For 23 months, from July 1943 to May 1945, Godo was part of the 6th Brigade and took part in all of its battles throughout Albania and Yugoslavia, where he was awarded for remarkable bravery.

He served as an officer in the army until 1948 and then was dismissed as "politically unwanted". In 1953 expelled from the communist party, which had joined in February 1944. With the expulsion begins his cavalcade through the years of the dictatorship. Because of the marriage with a girl from an aristocratic family (Vrioni) and his belonging to a family of intellectuals, opponents of the regime, who were shot, imprisoned and/or in exile, his life was multiple times of the razor's edge, up to the verge of incarceration.

== Literary career ==
Godo is known as a "rare pen", with historical novels, the most sensational and discussed are Skënderbeu and Ali Pashë Tepelena. He never stopped researching and rewriting these figures that exceeded the size of the nation. These critically acclaimed novels have been translated into several languages and reprinted and revised several times.

As a connoisseur of the human character, he wrote novels and short stories about the war. The works suffered a hard censorship and the regime accused him of depicting the war in a non-heroic way. In 1974 he was expelled from the "League of Writers" for "deviations from socialist realism" and sent to "reeducation" for 11 years (1974–1985). Godo had an intense activity in journalism, particularly in the journal "Hosteni", with over four thousand published pages with critical articles and editorials.

== Political career ==
In the 1990s, he was involved from the beginning in the anti-communist movement and on January 10, 1990, formed the Republican Party of Albania, (PR) a right-wing party, allied with the Democratic Party. PR had underlying in its program the respect for private property, family, and the nation's unification. For eight years, Godo was chairman of the party, to resign later, paving the way for the young people. From 1998 until his last days, he was Honorary President and Chairman of the National Assembly of PR.

Sabri Godo was a Member of the Albanian Parliament in two legislatures, (1996–2002) simultaneously holding the position of the Chair of the Foreign Affairs Committee. During this period and later, he played an active role in the intensification of Albanian relationships with European structures and other countries, extending his recognition to the highest levels of important political personalities.

Godo's role in resolving the Kosovo issue, for which he fought for 22 consecutive years, from the first day of the Republican Party establishment until the last days of his life, is undeniable. For this, the people and personalities in Kosovo have explicitly expressed their gratitude. It is known his role and struggles for the cause of the Cham Albanians, for the Albanians in Macedonia, Serbia and elsewhere.

Godo played a crucial role as co-chairman in drafting the New Constitution of the Republic of Albania in 1998. Often referred to, as "Father of the Constitution". He was one of the most important figures in Albanian political life, especially in difficult moments. His unwavering stance in the most sensitive and controversial causes, during heated political terms, and his constant efforts to find the path of reason, brought the people, media, and politicians to call him "the wise old Godo". "

== Death ==
Godo died after battling pulmonary cancer on 3 December 2011. He was buried in Tufine, Tirana, the following day. The government decided to make the following day a National mourning day, with flags flying at half-mast, from 12.30 to 14.30.

Homages were held on 4 December at the premises of the plenary hall of the Assembly of the Republic of Albania. Funebre music was broadcast during the funeral, by the Albanian national public Radio-Television (RTSH)

The Municipality of Tirana, unveiled a statue of Godo on the premises of the Assembly of the Republic of Albania, on May 10, 2013.

== Honours ==
On December 12, 2012, the President of Republic of Albania, Bujar Nishani, posthumously awarded Godo the Order of Skanderbeg " with the citation: "To the prominent national personality in politics and culture, to the wise and visionary politician, with valuable contribution to democratic processes, to the writer and screenwriter who put his talent in the service of his country and people".

On December 14, 2012, the President of the Italian Republic, his Excellency, Giorgio Napolitano, awarded Godo the honorary title of Commendatore of the Order of Merit of the Italian Republic with the citation: "In consideration of the merits of the individual, and the proposal of the President of the Council of Ministers, by decree dated 27 December 2011, submits Mr. Sabri Godo, honorary title of" Commendatore ", with the right to enjoy the relevant honors and to be recorded in the Commendatore's book."

== Literary work ==
- "Plaku i Butkës", Historical novel (1966);
- "sq:Ali Pashë Tepelena (roman)", novel (1970);
- "Zëra nga burime të nxehta", storybook (1972);
- "Intendenti", short story (1973);
- "sq:Skënderbeu (roman historik)" Historical Novel (1975);
- "Prova e zjarrit", novel (1977);
- "Kohët që shkojnë, kohët që vijnë", chronicles (1985);
- "Ujërat e qeta", novel, (1988);
- "Koha e njeriut", novel (1990);
- "Udhëtari", novel (2009).

== Screenplay ==
- "Dritat e qytezës " (1983)
- "Intendenti" (1980)
