= Socialist Party of Albania =

Political party in Albania

Socialist Party of Albania Partia Socialiste e Shqipërisë
- Abbreviation: PS; PSSh; SP
- Chairman: Edi Rama
- Leader of the Parliamentary Group: Taulant Balla
- General Secretary: Blendi Klosi
- Founded: 13 June 1991
- Preceded by: Party of Labour of Albania
- Headquarters: Sheshi Austria 4, 1001 Tirana
- Newspaper: Zëri i Popullit
- Youth wing: Euro-Socialist Youth Forum
- Membership (2025): 93,000
- Ideology: Social democracy Pro-Europeanism
- Political position: Centre-left
- European affiliation: Party of European Socialists (associate)
- International affiliation: Socialist International
- Colours: Official: Red; Green (official) (Note: Used in the party logo and flag.); Customary: Purple; Magenta (customary) (Note: Used by the party in campaigning and media, and by the Albanian government in parliamentary diagrams.)
- Slogan: Për Shqipërinë që duam ("For the Albania that We Want")
- Parliament: 82 / 140
- Municipality: 54 / 61
- Council Seats: 757 / 1,613

Website
- ps.al

The Socialist Party of Albania (Albanian: Partia Socialiste e Shqipërisë, PSSh), also known as simply the Socialist Party (Albanian: Partia Socialiste, PS), is a social-democratic centre-left political party in Albania. It is the successor to the Party of Labour of Albania, which reconstituted itself under its current name on 13 June 1991 after the fall of communism in an effort to adapt to the new political landscape. It has been the country’s Governing Party since 2013. The Socialist Party is one of the two major parties in Albanian politics along with the Democratic Party. The PS is an associate of the Party of European Socialists and a member of the Socialist International.

== History ==
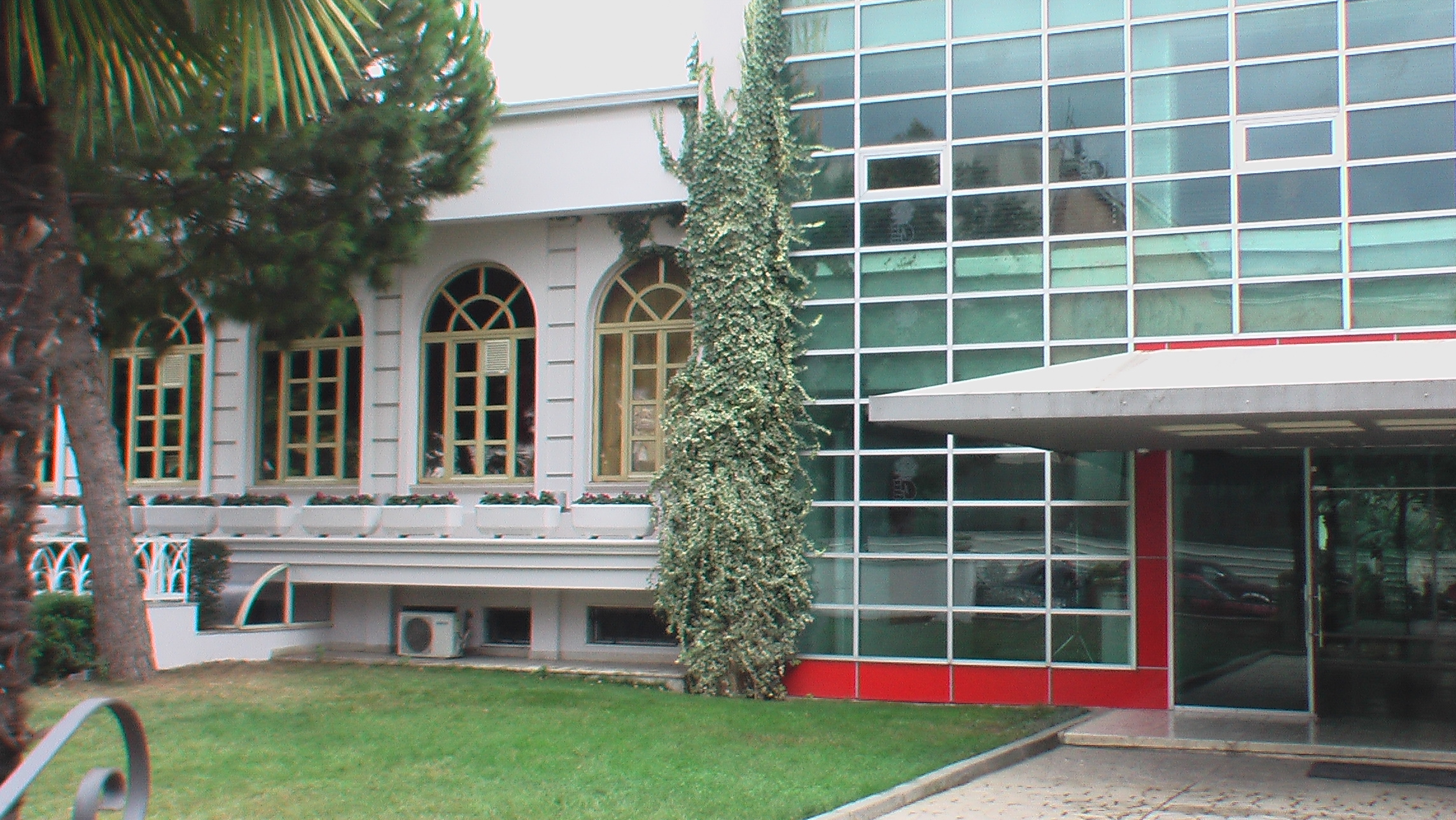
Party headquarters in Tirana

The Socialist Party of Albania emerged in the aftermath of the fall of communism in Albania that had dominated Albanian politics since the end of World War II. The dissolution of the People's Socialist Republic prompted a reevaluation of political ideologies and a quest for democratic governance, paving the way for the rise of multiple political entities. The roots of the Socialist Party can be traced back to the Party of Labour of Albania under its founder Enver Hoxha, which had been the ruling party for over four decades. Hoxha's successor Ramiz Alia was forced to introduce limited reforms in the late 1980s. On 11 December 1990, Alia announced that the PPSh had given up its monopoly of power. The PPSh won the 1991 Albanian Constitutional Assembly election, the first free elections held in the country in almost 80 years. By this time, it was no longer a Marxist–Leninist party. At an extraordinary congress on 10–13 June 1991, the PPSh reorganized as the PS in an effort to adapt to survive in the new system.

Fatos Nano, a man from the intelligentsia, was elected the new chairman. Nano helped to reform the old Communist party and made it a member of the Socialist International. A faction of the party, led by Ilir Meta, split away from the PS in 2004 and formed the Socialist Movement for Integration (Lëvizja Socialiste për Integrim, LSI).

On 10 October 2005, Nano resigned as the chairman of the PS after losing the 2005 Albanian parliamentary election, and was succeeded by Edi Rama. Under Rama's lead, the PS formed the Alliance for a European Albania, which united several political parties. The alliance won the 2013 Albanian parliamentary election, thus returning the Socialists to the government after 8 years.

The Socialist Party, now running alone, again won the 2017 election and the 2021 election, winning 74 seats in both of them and is thus currently able to rule Albania alone, although it is externally supported by the Social Democratic Party in parliament.

== Political positions ==
As a party in Albania, the Socialist Party of Albania is described as social-democratic and centre-left. In its 2013 party platform, the party has pledged to replace the flat tax with a progressive tax, and also supports universal health care. Party leader Edi Rama has indicated that he supports LGBT rights in Albania. The party is also pro-European, supports the accession of Albania to the European Union, NATO membership, and considers Kosovo "Albania's main strategic partner and ally".

== Organisation ==
=== Logos ===
The current logo is based on the fist and rose logo in the version created by José María Cruz Novillo for the Spanish Socialist Workers Party in 1977. The PS logo is used without official consent and agreement with PSOE.

2013–2023

=== Party leaders ===
No.	President	Born–died	Term start	Term end	Time in office
1	Fatos Nano	(1952—2025)	13 June 1991	10 October 2005	14 years, 119 days
2	Edi Rama	(born 1964)	10 October 2005	Incumbent	21 years, 27 days

== Election results ==
=== Parliamentary elections ===
Election	Leader	Votes	%	Seats	+/–	Rank	Government
1992	Fatos Nano	433,602	23.87	38 / 140	▼131 (Note: The Socialist Party is a successor of the former Communist Party.)	▼2nd	Opposition
1996	Fatos Nano	335,402	20.37	10 / 140	▼28	2nd	Opposition
1997	Fatos Nano	413,369	52.75	101 / 155	▲97	▲1st	Majority
2001	Fatos Nano	555,272	42.27	73 / 140	▼28	1st	Majority
2005	Fatos Nano	538,906	39.44	42 / 140	▼31	▼2nd	Opposition
2009	Edi Rama	620,586	40.85	65 / 140	▲23	▲1st	Opposition
2013	Edi Rama	713,407	41.36	65 / 140	Steady	1st	Coalition
2017	Edi Rama	764,761	48.19	74 / 140	▲9	1st	Majority
2021	Edi Rama	768,177	48.68	74 / 140	Steady	1st	Majority
2025	Edi Rama	856,177	53.27	83 / 140	▲9	1st	Majority

== See also ==
- Political Academy of the Socialist Party of Albania
- List of political parties in Albania
