= People's Socialist Republic of Albania =

Albanian state from 1946 to 1991

People's Republic of Albania (1946–1976) Republika Popullore e Shqipërisë People's Socialist Republic of Albania (1976–1991) Republika Popullore Socialiste e Shqipërisë
- 1946–1991
- Flag Emblem
- Motto: Ti Shqipëri, më jep nder, më jep emrin Shqipëtar "Albania, you give me honor, you give me the name Albanian"; Proletarë të të gjitha vendeve, bashkohuni! "Proletarians of all countries, unite!"
- Anthem: Himni i Flamurit "Hymn to the Flag"
- The People's Republic of Albania in 1989
- Status: Satellite state of the Soviet Union (until 1961), member of the Warsaw Pact (until 1968) and Comecon (until 1987)
- Capital and largest city: Tirana
- Official languages: Albanian
- Religion: 1946–1967; Secular state (de jure); State atheism (de facto); 1967–1990; State atheism (official); 1990–1991; Secular state (de jure); State atheism (de facto)
- Demonym: Albanian
- Government: Communist state
- De facto leader
  - 1946–1985: Enver Hoxha
  - 1985–1990: Ramiz Alia
- Chairman of the Presidium of the People's Assembly
  - 1946–1953: Omer Nishani
  - 1953–1982: Haxhi Lleshi
  - 1982–1991: Ramiz Alia
- Prime Minister
  - 1946–1954: Enver Hoxha
  - 1954–1981: Mehmet Shehu
  - 1981–1991: Adil Çarçani
- Legislature: People's Assembly
- Historical era: Cold War
  - Democratic Government: 20 October 1944
  - People's Republic formed: 11 January 1946
  - Albanian–Soviet split: 1956–1961
  - Constitution amended: 28 December 1976
  - Sino-Albanian split: 1972–1978
  - Fall of communism: 11 December 1990
  - Democratic elections: 31 March 1991
  - Communist state abolished: 29 April 1991

Area
  - Total: 28,748 km^{2} (11,100 sq mi)

Population
  - Estimate: 3,266,790 (1990)
- GDP (PPP): 1989 estimate
  - Total: $4 billion
  - Per capita: $1,163
- HDI (1990 formula): 0.790 high
- Currency: Franga (1946–1947); Albanian lek (1947–1991)
- Calling code: +355
Preceded by	Succeeded by
Democratic Government of Albania	Republic of Albania
- Today part of: Albania

The People's Socialist Republic of Albania (Albanian: Republika Popullore Socialiste e Shqipërisë) was the communist state that existed in Albania from 11 January 1946 to 29 April 1991. Originally founded as the People's Republic of Albania from 1946 to 1976, it was governed by the Party of Labour of Albania (PPSh), which had a constitutionally enshrined monopoly on state power.

The PPSh enforced its monopoly on state power by controlling the state and other mass organizations, and by controlling Albania's supreme organ of state power, the People's Assembly.

Communist Albania was established after the end of World War II, succeeding the communist-dominated National Liberation Movement-led (or LANÇ) Democratic Government of Albania. Under the leadership of the PPSh and especially Enver Hoxha, Albania pursued an anti-revisionist Stalinist form of Marxism-Leninism, which led to the Albanian-Soviet split in 1956 and then the Sino-Albanian split in 1978. The state was first led by Enver Hoxha from 1946 to 1985, and then by Ramiz Alia from 1985 to 1991. The period of Enver Hoxha's leadership is commonly referred to as Hoxhaist Albania and as the Hoxhaist regime.

Governed as a totalitarian dictatorship, travel and visa restrictions made Albania one of the most difficult countries to visit or travel from. Being Europe's only Muslim-majority country at the time, it declared itself the world's first explicitly atheist state (Note: Numerous countries, including Albania, had already functioned as atheist states, but they had all technically been de jure secular states.) in 1967, completely criminalising religion. It was the only Warsaw Pact member to formally withdraw from the alliance before 1990, an action which was occasioned by the Warsaw Pact invasion of Czechoslovakia in August 1968. The government implemented reforms which were aimed at modernizing Albania, and they resulted in significant gains in the areas of industry, agriculture, education, the arts, and culture, which contributed to a general increase in the Albanian population's standard of living. However, these developments coincided with political repression by the secret police, the Sigurimi, for the purposes of preventing a counter-revolution, which included dismissal from employment, imprisonment in forced labor camps and executions.

The first multi-party elections in Socialist Albania took place on 31 March 1991 – the Communists gained a majority in an interim government. The Republic of Albania was proclaimed on 29 April 1991 and the country's first parliamentary elections were held on 22 March 1992 leading to the anti-communist oppositional victory. On 7 April 1992, all communist symbols were removed and the legal foundation of the People's Socialist Republic of Albania was only repealed on 28 November 1998 upon the adoption of the new Constitution of Albania.

== History ==
=== Consolidation of power and initial reforms ===
On 29 November 1944, Albania was liberated from German occupation by the National Liberation Movement (In Albanian: Lëvizja Anti-fashiste Nacional-Çlirimtare, or LANÇ), having previously formed a provisional government (Anti-Fascist National Liberation Council) in May that year.

The government, like the LANÇ, was dominated by the two-year-old Communist Party of Albania, and the party's first secretary, Enver Hoxha, became Albania's prime minister. From the start, the LANÇ government was an undisguised Communist regime. In most of the rest of what became the Eastern Bloc, the Communist parties were nominally part of a coalition government for a few years before seizing full control and creating one-party states.

Having sidelined the nationalist Balli Kombëtar after their collaboration with the Nazis, the LANÇ quickly moved to consolidate its power, liberate the country's tenants and workers, and fraternally link Albania with other socialist countries.

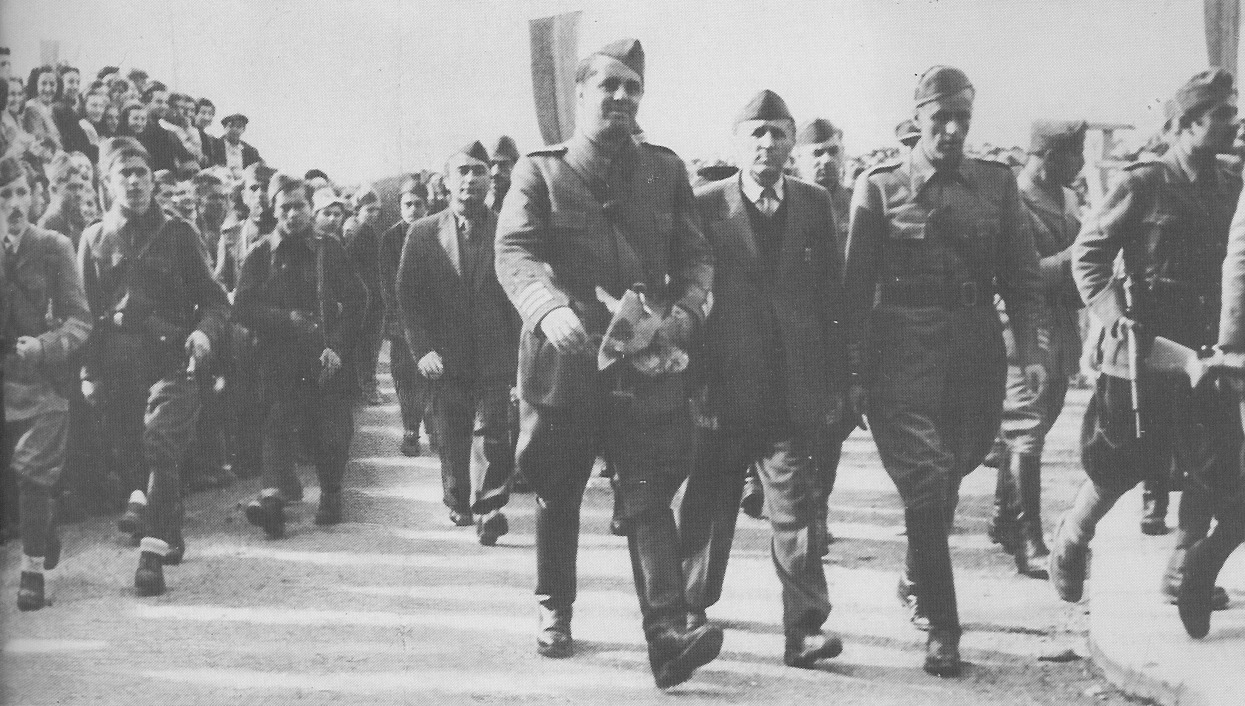
Partisans entering Tirana on 29 November 1944

The internal affairs minister, Koçi Xoxe, "an erstwhile pro-Yugoslavia tinsmith", presided over the trial of many non-communist politicians who were condemned as "enemies of the people" and "war criminals". Many were sentenced to death. Those spared were imprisoned for years in work camps and jails and later settled on state farms built on reclaimed marshlands.

In December 1944, the provisional government adopted laws allowing the state to regulate foreign and domestic trade, commercial enterprises, and the few industries the country possessed. The laws sanctioned confiscation of property belonging to political exiles and "enemies of the people". The state also expropriated all German- and Italian-owned property, nationalized transportation enterprises, and canceled all concessions granted by previous Albanian governments to foreign companies.

In August 1945, the provisional government adopted the first sweeping agricultural reforms in Albania's history. The country's 100 largest landowners, who controlled close to a third of Albania's arable land, had frustrated all agricultural reform proposals before the war. The communists' reforms were aimed at squeezing large landowners out of business, winning peasant support, and increasing farm output to avert famine. The government annulled outstanding agricultural debts, granted peasants access to inexpensive water for irrigation, and nationalized forest and pastureland.

Under the Agrarian Reform Law, which redistributed about half of Albania's arable land, the government confiscated property belonging to absentee landlords and people not dependent on agriculture for a living. The few peasants with agricultural machinery were permitted to keep up to 40 hectares (99 acres) of land. Landholdings of religious institutions and peasants without agricultural machinery were limited to 20 hectares (49 acres). Finally, landless peasants and peasants with tiny landholdings were given up to 5 hectares (12 acres), although they had to pay nominal compensation.

In December 1945, Albanians elected a new People's Assembly, but voters were presented with a single list from the Communist-dominated Democratic Front (previously the National Liberation Movement). Official ballot tallies showed that 92% of the electorate voted and that 93% of the voters chose the Democratic Front ticket.

The assembly convened in January 1946. Its first act was to formally dethrone Zog I, abolish the monarchy and to declare Albania a "people's republic". Zog was barred from Albania after being dethroned.

Albania had already been under out-and-out Communist rule for just over two years. After months of angry debate, the assembly adopted a constitution that mirrored the Yugoslav and Soviet constitutions. A couple of months later, the assembly members chose a new government, which was emblematic of Hoxha's continuing consolidation of power: Hoxha became simultaneously prime minister, foreign minister, defense minister, and the army's commander in chief. Xoxe remained both internal affairs minister and the party's organizational secretary.

In late 1945 and early 1946, Xoxe and other party hard-liners purged moderates who had pressed for close contacts with the West, a modicum of political pluralism, and a delay in the introduction of strict communist economic measures until Albania's economy had more time to develop. Hoxha remained in control despite the fact that he had once advocated restoring relations with Italy and even allowing Albanians to study in Italy.

The government took major steps to introduce a Stalinist-style centrally planned economy in 1946. It nationalized all industries, transformed foreign trade into a government monopoly, brought almost all domestic trade under state control, and banned land sales and transfers. Planners at the newly founded Economic Planning Commission emphasized industrial development and in 1947 the government introduced the Soviet cost-accounting system.

=== Albanian–Yugoslav tensions ===
Until Yugoslavia's expulsion from the Cominform in 1948, Albania was effectively a Yugoslav satellite. In repudiating the 1943 Albanian internal Mukaj agreement under pressure from the Yugoslavs, Albania's communists had given up on their demands for a Yugoslav cession of Kosovo to Albania after the war. In January 1945, the two governments signed a treaty establishing Kosovo as a Yugoslav autonomous province. Shortly thereafter, Yugoslavia became the first country to recognize Albania's provisional government.

In July 1946, Yugoslavia and Albania signed a treaty of friendship and cooperation that was quickly followed by a series of technical and economic agreements laying the groundwork for integrating the Albanian and Yugoslav economies. The pacts provided for coordinating the economic plans of both states, standardizing their monetary systems, and creating a common pricing system and a customs union. So close was the Yugoslav-Albanian relationship that Serbo-Croatian became a required subject in Albanian high schools.

Yugoslavia signed a similar friendship treaty with the Bulgarian People's Republic, and Marshal Josip Broz Tito and Bulgaria's Georgi Dimitrov talked of plans to establish a Balkan Federation to include Albania, Yugoslavia, and Bulgaria. Yugoslav advisers poured into Albania's government offices and its army headquarters. Tirana was desperate for outside aid, and about 20,000 tons of Yugoslav grain helped stave off famine. Albania also received US$26.3 million from the United Nations Relief and Rehabilitation Administration immediately after the war but had to rely on Yugoslavia for investment and development aid.

Joint Albanian–Yugoslav companies were created for mining, railroad construction, the production of petroleum and electricity, and international trade. Yugoslav investments led to the construction of a sugar refinery in Korçë, a food-processing plant in Elbasan, a hemp factory at Rrogozhinë, a fish cannery in Vlorë, and a printing press, telephone exchange, and textile mill in Tirana. The Yugoslavs also bolstered the Albanian economy by paying three times the international price for Albanian copper and other materials.

Relations between Albania and Yugoslavia declined, however, when the Albanians began complaining that the Yugoslavs were paying too little for Albanian raw materials and exploiting Albania through the joint stock companies. In addition, the Albanians sought investment funds to develop light industries and an oil refinery, while the Yugoslavs wanted the Albanians to concentrate on agriculture and raw-material extraction. The head of Albania's Economic Planning Commission, and Hoxha's right-hand man, Nako Spiru, became the leading critic of Yugoslavia's efforts to exert economic control over Albania. Tito distrusted the intellectuals (Hoxha and his allies) of the Albanian Party and, through Xoxe and his loyalists, attempted to unseat them.

In 1947, Yugoslavia acted against anti-Yugoslav Albanian communists, including Hoxha and Spiru. In May, Tirana announced the arrest, trial, and conviction of nine People's Assembly members, all of whom were known for opposing Yugoslavia, on charges of antistate activities. A month later, the Communist Party of Yugoslavia's Central Committee accused Hoxha of following "independent" policies and turning the Albanian people against Yugoslavia. This was the closest Hoxha ever came to being removed from power. Apparently attempting to buy support inside the Albanian Communist Party, Belgrade extended Tirana credits which were worth US$40 million, an amount which was equivalent to 58% of Albania's 1947 state budget. A year later, Yugoslavia's credits accounted for nearly half of Albania's 1948 state budget. Relations worsened in the fall, however, when Spiru's commission developed an economic plan that stressed self-sufficiency, light industry, and agriculture. The Yugoslavs complained bitterly. Subsequently, at a November 1947 meeting of the Albanian Economic Central Committee, Spiru came under intense criticism, which was spearheaded by Xoxe. Failure to win support from anyone within the party (he was effectively a fall guy for Hoxha) he was assassinated the very next day and his death framed as a suicide.

The insignificance of Albania's standing in the communist world was clearly highlighted when the emerging Eastern European nations did not invite the Party of Labour of Albania to the September 1947 founding meeting of the Cominform. Rather, Yugoslavia represented Albania at Cominform meetings. Although the Soviet Union gave Albania a pledge to build textile and sugar mills and other factories and provide agricultural and industrial machinery to Albania, Joseph Stalin told Milovan Djilas, at the time a high-ranking member of Yugoslavia's communist hierarchy, that Yugoslavia should "swallow" Albania.

The pro-Yugoslav faction wielded decisive political power in Albania well into 1948. At a party plenum in February and March, the communist leadership voted to merge the Albanian and Yugoslav economies and militaries. Hoxha even denounced Spiru for attempting to ruin Albanian-Yugoslav relations. During a party Political Bureau (Politburo) meeting a month later, Xoxe proposed appealing to Belgrade to admit Albania as a seventh Yugoslav republic. However, when the Cominform expelled Yugoslavia on 28 June, Albania made a rapid about-face in its policy towards Yugoslavia. Three days later, Tirana gave the Yugoslav advisers in Albania 48 hours to leave the country, rescinded all bilateral economic agreements with its neighbor, and launched a virulent anti-Yugoslav propaganda blitz that transformed Stalin into an Albanian national hero, Hoxha into a warrior against foreign aggression, and Tito into an imperialist monster.

Albania entered an orbit around the Soviet Union, and in September 1948 Moscow stepped in to compensate for Albania's loss of Yugoslav aid. The shift proved to be a boon for Albania because Moscow had far more to offer Albania than hard-strapped Belgrade had. The fact that the Soviet Union had no common border with Albania also appealed to the Albanian regime because it made it more difficult for Moscow to exert pressure on Tirana. In November at the First Party Congress of the Albanian Party of Labor (APL), the former Albanian Communist Party which renamed itself at Stalin's suggestion, Hoxha pinned the blame for the country's woes on Yugoslavia and Xoxe. Hoxha had Xoxe sacked as Albania's internal affairs minister in October, and he was replaced with Mehmet Shehu. After a secret trial in May 1949, Xoxe was executed. The subsequent anti-Titoist purges in Albania brought the liquidation of 14 members of the party's 31 person Central Committee and 32 of the 109 People's Assembly deputies. Overall, the party expelled about 25% of its members. Yugoslavia responded by launching a propaganda counterattack and canceling its treaty of friendship with Albania and in 1950, it withdrew its diplomatic mission from Tirana.

=== Deteriorating relations with the West ===
Albania's relations with the West soured after the Communist government's refusal to allow free elections in December 1945. Albania restricted the movement of United States and British personnel in the country, charging that they had instigated anti-Communist uprisings in the northern mountains. Britain announced in April that it would not send a diplomatic mission to Tirana; the United States withdrew its mission in November; and both the United States and Britain opposed admitting Albania to the United Nations (UN). Albania feared that the United States and Britain, which were supporting anti-Communist forces in the ongoing civil war in Greece, would back Greek demands for territory in southern Albania; and anxieties grew in July when a United States Senate resolution backed the Greek demands.

A major incident between Albania and Britain erupted in 1946 after Tirana claimed jurisdiction over the channel between the Albanian mainland and the Greek island of Corfu. Britain challenged Albania by sailing four destroyers into the channel. Two of the ships struck mines on 22 October 1946, and 44 crew members died. Britain complained to the UN and the International Court of Justice which, in its first case ever, ruled against Tirana.

After 1946 the United States and the United Kingdom began implementing an elaborate covert plan to overthrow Albania's Communist government by backing anti-Communist and royalist forces within the country. By 1949 the United States and British intelligence organizations were working with King Zog and the mountainmen of his personal guard. They recruited Albanian refugees and émigrés from Egypt, Italy, and Greece; trained them in Cyprus, Malta, and the Federal Republic of Germany (West Germany); and infiltrated them into Albania. Guerrilla units entered Albania in 1950 and 1952, but Albanian security forces killed or captured all of them. Kim Philby, a Soviet double agent working as a liaison officer between the British intelligence service and the United States Central Intelligence Agency, had leaked details of the infiltration plan to Moscow, and the security breach claimed the lives of about 300 infiltrators.

Following a wave of subversive activity, including the failed infiltration and the March 1951 bombing of the Soviet embassy in Tirana, the Communist authorities implemented harsh internal security measures. In September 1952, the assembly enacted a penal code that required the death penalty for anyone over eleven years old who was found guilty of conspiring against the state, damaging state property, or committing economic sabotage. Political executions were common and between 5,000 and 25,000 people were killed in total during the Communist era.

=== In the Soviet sphere ===
Albania primarily depended on Soviet assistance and know-how after its break with Yugoslavia in 1948. In February 1949, Albania gained membership in the communist bloc's organization for coordinating economic planning, the Council for Mutual Economic Assistance (Comecon). Tirana soon entered into trade agreements with Poland, Czechoslovakia, Hungary, Romania, and the Soviet Union. Soviet and East European technical advisers took up residence in Albania, and the Soviet Union also sent Albania military advisers and built a submarine installation on Sazan Island. After the Soviet-Yugoslav split, Albania and Bulgaria remained the only countries that the Soviet Union could use to supply war material to the communists fighting in Greece. What little strategic value Albania offered the Soviet Union, however, gradually shrank as nuclear-arms technology developed.

Aligned with the orthodox line of Stalin, Albania's Communist Party implemented elements of Stalinist policy and economics. In 1949 Albania adopted the basic elements of the Soviet fiscal system, under which state enterprises paid direct contributions to the treasury from their profits and kept only a share authorized for self-financed investments and other purposes. In 1951 the Albanian government launched its first five-year plan, which emphasized utilizing the country's oil, chromite, copper, nickel, asphalt, and coal resources; expanding electricity production and the power grid; increasing agricultural output; and improving transportation. The government began a program of rapid industrialization after the APL's Second Party Congress and a campaign of collectivization of farmland in 1955. At the time, private farms still produced about 87% of Albania's agricultural output, but by 1960 the same percentage came from collective or state farms.

Soviet-Albanian relations remained warm during the last years of Stalin's life, although Albania was an economic liability for the Soviet Union. Albania conducted all its foreign trade with Soviet European countries in 1949, 1950, and 1951 – and over half its trade with the Soviet Union itself. Together with its satellites, the Soviet Union underwrote shortfalls in Albania's balance-of-payments with long-term grants.

Although far behind Western practice, health care and education improved dramatically for Albania's 1.2 million people in the early 1950s. The number of Albanian doctors increased by a third to about 150 early in the decade (although the doctor-patient ratio remained unacceptable by most standards), and the state opened new medical-training facilities. The number of hospital beds rose from 1,765 in 1945 to about 5,500 in 1953. Better health-care and living conditions produced an improvement in Albania's dismal infant-mortality rate, lowering it from 112.2 deaths per 1,000 live births in 1945 to 99.5 deaths per 1,000 births in 1953. The education system, geared towards cementing communism and creating the academic and technical cadres necessary for construction of a socialist state and society, also improved dramatically. The number of schools, teachers, and students doubled between 1945 and 1950. Illiteracy declined from perhaps 85% in 1946 to 31% in 1950. The Soviet Union provided scholarships for Albanian students and supplied specialists and study materials to improve instruction in Albania. The State University of Tirana (later the University of Tirana) was founded in 1957 and the Albanian Academy of Sciences opened 15 years later.

Stalin died in March 1953, and apparently fearing that the Soviet leader's demise might encourage rivals within the Albanian party's ranks, neither Hoxha nor Shehu risked traveling to Moscow to attend his funeral. The Soviet Union's subsequent movement toward rapprochement with the Yugoslavs alarmed the two Albanian leaders. Tirana soon came under pressure from Moscow to copy, at least formally, the new Soviet model for collective leadership. In July 1953, Hoxha handed over the foreign affairs and defense portfolios to loyal followers, but he kept both the top party post and the premiership until 1954, when Shehu became Albania's prime minister. The Soviet Union, responding with an effort to raise the Albanian leaders' morale, elevated diplomatic relations between the two countries to the ambassadorial level.

Despite some cautious expressions of enthusiasm, Hoxha and Shehu quickly turned against Nikita Khrushchev's programs of "peaceful coexistence" and "different roads to socialism". Raising concerns over supposed steps towards Marxist revisionism, the Albanian Communists relationship with the Union began to decline. Tirana and Belgrade renewed diplomatic relations in December 1953, but Hoxha refused Khrushchev's repeated appeals to posthumously rehabilitate the pro-Yugoslav Xoxe as a gesture to Tito. The Albanian duo instead entrenched their political position, expanding their control over their country's domestic life and letting the propaganda war with the Yugoslavs grind on. In 1955 Albania became a founding member of the Warsaw Treaty Organization, better known as the Warsaw Pact, the only military alliance the nation ever joined. Although the pact represented the first promise Albania had obtained from any of the communist countries to defend its borders, the treaty did nothing to assuage the Albanian leaders' deep mistrust of Yugoslavia.

Hoxha and Shehu, utilizing their immediate successes and Albanians' deep-seated fear of Yugoslav domination, were able to successfully maintain power during the Twentieth Party Congress of the Communist Party of the Soviet Union in 1956, when Khrushchev denounced Stalin's Administration in his "secret speech". Hoxha, deeply alarmed by the denunciation, defended Stalin and refused to follow Khrushchev's attempt at stepping away from the prior Soviet Administration. As the first years of the Khrushchev Administration passed, Hoxha continued to maintain this position, including through the disturbances in Poland and the rebellion in Hungary in 1956. Hoxha during this period purged party moderates with pro-Soviet and pro-Yugoslav leanings, however toned down his anti-Yugoslav rhetoric after a successful April 1957 trip to Moscow. This trip proved pivotal for the Albanian State, Hoxha having won cancellation of about US$105 million in outstanding loans and about US$7.8 million in additional food assistance. By 1958, however, tensions had re-sparked between Hoxha and Tito, with continued conflict over the issue of Albanians in Kosovo. There was further tension over a Comecon plan for integrating the East European economies, which called for Albania to produce agricultural goods and minerals instead of emphasizing the development of heavy industry. On a twelve-day visit to Albania in 1959, Khrushchev reportedly tried to convince Hoxha and Shehu that their country should aspire to become "socialism's orchard".

=== In the Chinese sphere ===
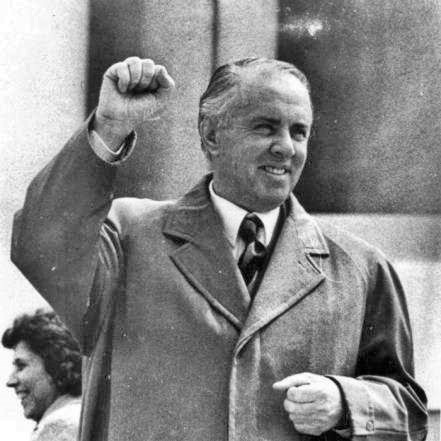
Enver Hoxha in 1971

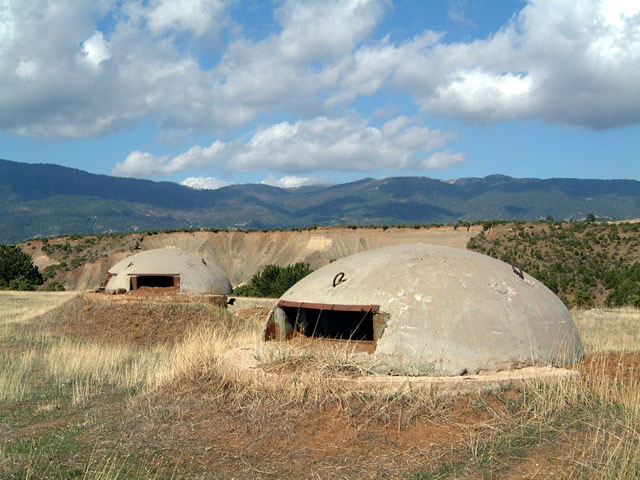
Bunkers in Albania built during Hoxha's rule to avert the possibility of external invasions. By 1983 approximately 173,371 concrete bunkers were scattered throughout the country.

Albania played a pronounced role in the Sino-Soviet split. By 1958, Albania stood with the People's Republic of China (PRC) in opposing Moscow on issues of peaceful coexistence, de-Stalinization, and Yugoslavia's "separate road to socialism" through decentralization of economic life. The Soviet Union, other Eastern European countries, and China all offered Albania large amounts of aid. Soviet leaders also promised to build a large Palace of Culture in Tirana as a symbol of the Soviet people's "love and friendship" for the Albanians. But despite these gestures, Tirana was dissatisfied with Moscow's economic policy towards Albania. Hoxha and Shehu apparently decided in either May or June 1960 that Albania was assured of Chinese support, and when sharp polemics erupted between the PRC and the Soviet Union, they openly sided with the former. Ramiz Alia, at the time a candidate-member of the Politburo and Hoxha's adviser on ideological questions, played a prominent role in the rhetoric.

The Sino-Soviet split burst into the open in June 1960 at a Romanian Workers' Party congress, at which Khrushchev attempted to secure condemnation of Beijing. Albania's delegation, alone among the European delegations, supported the Chinese. The Soviet Union immediately retaliated by organizing a campaign to oust Hoxha and Shehu in the summer of 1960. Moscow cut promised grain deliveries to Albania during a drought, and the Soviet embassy in Tirana overtly encouraged a pro-Soviet faction in the Party of Labour of Albania (APL) to speak out against the party's pro-Chinese stance. Moscow also apparently involved itself in a plot within the APL to unseat Hoxha and Shehu by force. But given their tight control of the party machinery, army, and Shehu's secret police, the Directorate of State Security (Drejtorija e Sigurimit të Shtetit—Sigurimi), the two Albanian leaders easily parried the threat. Four pro-Soviet Albanian leaders, including Teme Sejko and Tahir Demi, were eventually tried and executed. The PRC immediately began making up for the cancellation of Soviet wheat shipments despite a paucity of foreign currency and its own economic hardships.

Albania again sided with the People's Republic of China when it launched an attack on the Soviet Union's leadership of the international communist movement at the November 1960 Moscow conference of the world's 81 communist parties. Hoxha inveighed against Khrushchev for encouraging Greek claims to southern Albania, sowing discord within the APL and army, and using economic blackmail. "Soviet rats were able to eat while the Albanian people were dying of hunger," Hoxha railed, referring to purposely delayed Soviet grain deliveries. Communist leaders loyal to Moscow described Hoxha's performance as "gangsterish" and "infantile", and the speech extinguished any chance of an agreement between Moscow and Tirana. For the next year, Albania played proxy for China. Pro-Soviet Communist parties, reluctant to confront China directly, criticized Beijing by castigating Albania. China, for its part, frequently gave prominence to the Albanians' fulminations against the Soviet Union and Yugoslavia, which Tirana referred to as a "socialist hell".

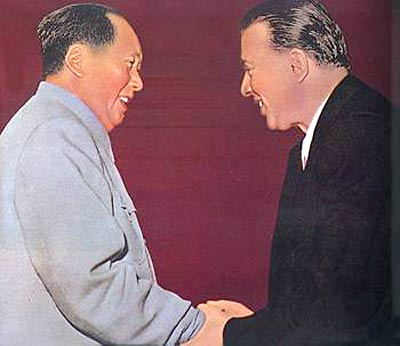
Mao Zedong and Hoxha in 1956

Hoxha and Shehu continued their harangue against the Soviet Union and Yugoslavia at the APL's Fourth Party Congress in February 1961. During the congress, the Albanian government announced the broad outlines of the country's Third Five-Year Plan (1961–65), which allocated 54% of all investment to industry, thereby rejecting Khrushchev's wish to make Albania primarily an agricultural producer. Moscow responded by canceling aid programs and lines of credit for Albania, but China again came to the rescue.

After additional sharp exchanges between Soviet and Chinese delegates over Albania at the Communist Party of the Soviet Union's Twenty-Second Party Congress in October 1961, Khrushchev lambasted the Albanians for executing an allegedly pregnant, pro-Soviet member of the Albanian party Politburo Liri Gega, and the Soviet Union finally broke diplomatic relations with Albania in December. Moscow then withdrew all Soviet economic advisers and technicians from the country, including those at work on the Palace of Culture, and halted shipments of supplies and spare parts for equipment already in place in Albania. In addition, the Soviet Union continued to dismantle its naval installations on Sazan Island, a process that had begun even before the break in relations.

China again compensated Albania for the loss of Soviet economic support, supplying about 90% of the parts, foodstuffs, and other goods the Soviet Union had promised. China lent Albania money on more favorable terms than Moscow, and, unlike Soviet advisers, Chinese technicians earned the same low pay as Albanian workers and lived in similar housing. China also presented Albania with a powerful radio transmission station from which Tirana sang the praises of Stalin, Hoxha, and Mao Zedong for decades. For its part, Albania offered China a beachhead in Europe and acted as China's chief spokesman at the United Nations. To Albania's dismay, however, Chinese equipment and technicians were not nearly as sophisticated as the Soviet goods and advisers they replaced. Ironically, a language barrier even forced the Chinese and Albanian technicians to communicate in Russian. Albanians no longer took part in Warsaw Pact activities or Comecon agreements. The other East European communist nations, however, did not break diplomatic or trade links with Albania. In 1964, the Albanians went so far as to seize the empty Soviet embassy in Tirana, and Albanian workers pressed on with construction of the Palace of Culture on their own.

The shift away from the Soviet Union wreaked havoc on Albania's economy. Half of its imports and exports had been geared toward Soviet suppliers and markets, so the souring of Tirana's relations with Moscow brought Albania's foreign trade to near collapse as China proved incapable of delivering promised machinery and equipment on time. The low productivity, flawed planning, poor workmanship, and inefficient management at Albanian enterprises became clear when Soviet and Eastern European aid and advisers were withdrawn. In 1962, the Albanian government introduced an austerity program, appealing to the people to conserve resources, cut production costs, and abandon unnecessary investment.

==== Withdrawal from the Warsaw Pact ====
In October 1964, Hoxha hailed Khrushchev's fall from power, and the Soviet Union's new leaders made overtures to Tirana. It soon became clear, however, that the new Soviet leadership had no intention of changing its basic policies to suit Albania, and relations failed to improve. For decades, Tirana's propaganda continued to refer to Soviet officials as "treacherous revisionists" and "traitors to Communism", and in 1964, Hoxha said that Albania's terms for reconciliation were a Soviet apology to Albania and reparations for damages which it had inflicted on the country. Albania had also been feuding with Moscow over suggestions that Albania should focus on agriculture to the detriment of industrial development. Soviet-Albanian relations dipped to new lows after the Warsaw Pact invasion of Czechoslovakia in 1968, and Albania felt that the Soviet Union had become too liberal since the death of Joseph Stalin. The invasion served as the tipping point, and within one month (September 1968) Albania formally withdrew from the Warsaw Pact. Leonid Brezhnev made no attempt to force Albania to remain.

==== Cultural and Ideological Revolution ====
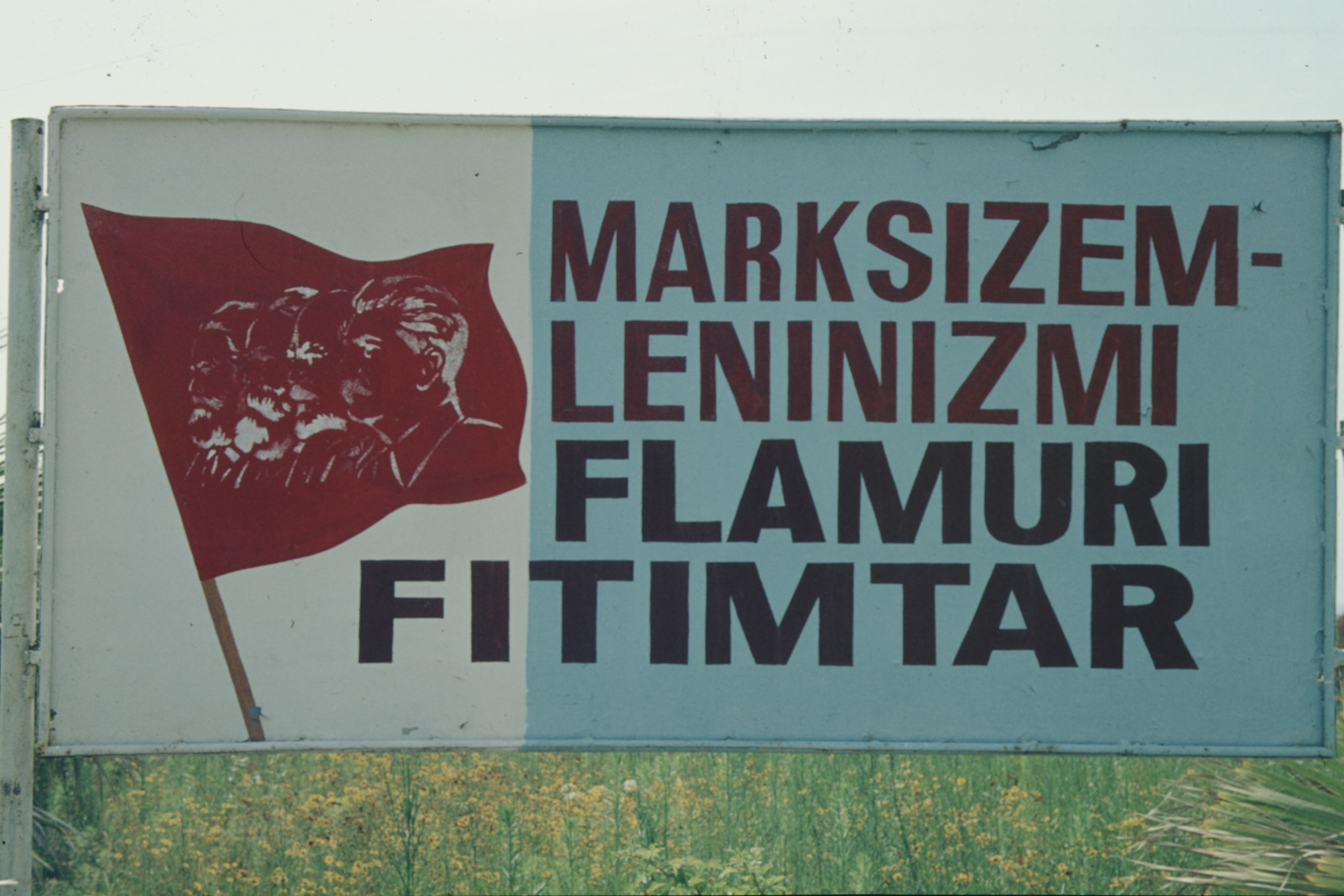
Albanian poster in 1978: Marxism-Leninism: Victorious flag

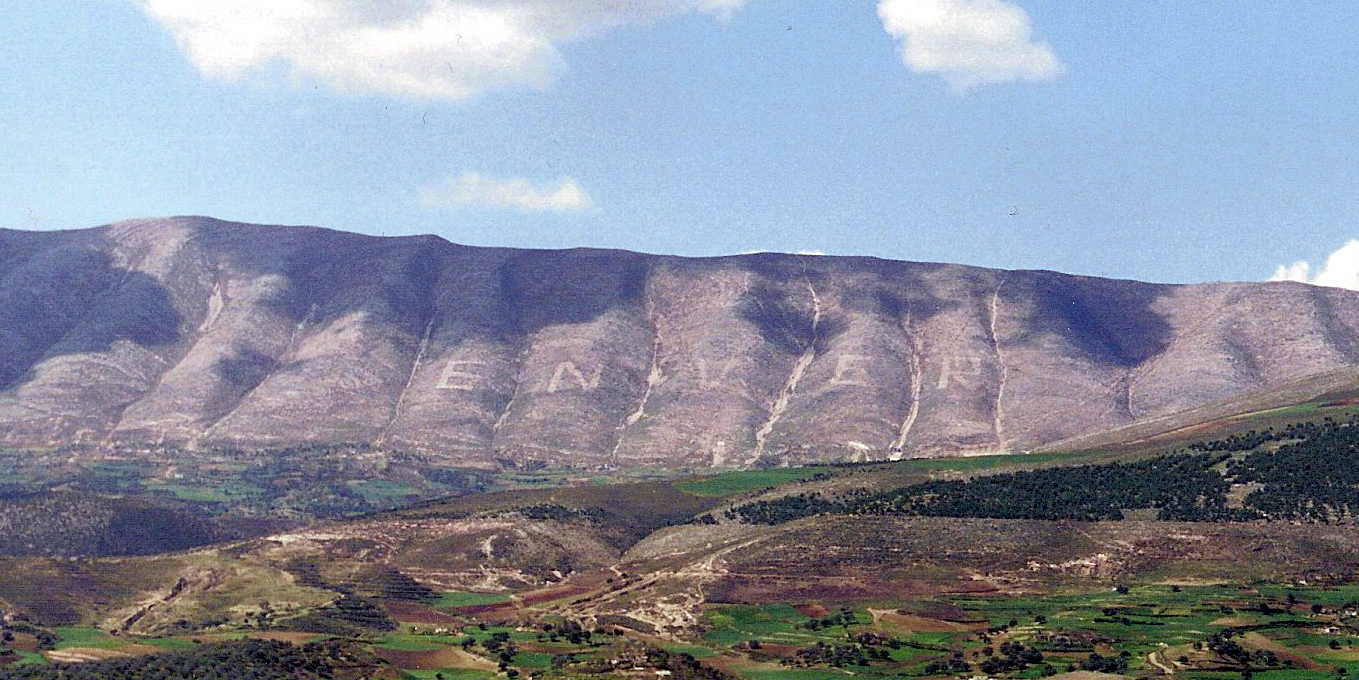
Mount Shpiragu as seen from Berat showing the name of Enver written on its side

In the mid-1960s, Albania's leaders grew wary of a threat to their power by a burgeoning bureaucracy. Party discipline had eroded. People complained about malfeasance, inflation, and low-quality goods. Writers strayed from the orthodoxy of socialist realism, which demanded that art and literature serve as instruments of government and party policy. As a result, after Mao Zedong unleashed the Cultural Revolution in China in 1966, Hoxha launched his own Cultural and Ideological Revolution. The Albanian leader concentrated on reforming the military, government bureaucracy, and economy as well as on creating new support for his system. The regime abolished military ranks, reintroduced political commissars into the military, and renounced professionalism in the army. Railing against a "white-collar mentality", the authorities also slashed the salaries of mid- and high-level officials, ousted administrators and specialists from their desk jobs, and sent such persons to toil in the factories and fields. Six ministries, including the Ministry of Justice, were eliminated. Farm collectivization even spread to the remote mountains. In addition, the government attacked dissident writers and artists, reformed its educational system, and generally reinforced Albania's isolation from European culture in an effort to keep out foreign influences.

After the 5th Congress of the Party of Labor of Albania and Enver Hoxha's speech on 6 February 1967, the authorities launched a violent campaign to extinguish religious life in Albania, claiming that religion had divided the Albanian nation and kept it mired in backwardness. Student agitators combed the countryside, forcing Albanians to quit practicing their faiths. Despite complaints, even by APL members, all churches, mosques, monasteries, and other religious institutions were closed or converted into warehouses, gymnasiums, and workshops by year's end. A special decree abrogated the charters by which the country's main religious communities had operated. The campaign culminated in an announcement that Albania had become the world's first atheistic state, a feat which was trumpeted as one of Enver Hoxha's greatest achievements. While the Albanian Constitution had at least guaranteed freedom of religion to the Albanian people on paper right up until that time, religious freedom was virtually non-existent after 1967. The 1976 Constitution of the People's Socialist Republic of Albania later stipulated in Article 37 that "The state recognizes no religion whatever and supports atheist propaganda for the purpose of inculcating the scientific materialist world outlook in people" and Article 55 explicitly forbade the formation of "any type of organization of a fascist, anti-democratic, religious, and anti-socialist character" and stated that "Fascist, anti-democratic, religious, war-mongering, and anti-socialist activities and propaganda, as well as the incitement of national and racial hatred are prohibited."

On 1 November 1977, Enver Hoxha claimed in his Report submitted to the 7th Congress of the Party of Labor of Albania on the activity of the Party's Central Committee that the 1976 Constitution was an embodiment of the free will of the Albanian people, because genuine democracy was necessary in order for socialism to actually exist. He said that, "the broad masses of the working people freely aired their views on the new Fundamental Law of our state of the dictatorship of the proletariat. About 1,500,000 people, practically the entire adult population of the country, participated in the meetings which were held, and about 300,000 people contributed to the discussion... The great popular discussion, characterized by a free and fruitful thrashing out of opinions, by lively and constructive debate, was a clear expression of our socialist democracy in action and the genuine sovereignty of the people. It demonstrated in practice that in socialist Albania the people are the masters, that nothing is done against their will." The numerous testimonies of those who suffered under the religious persecution of this era, however, casts serious doubts into how "free and fruitful" the thrashing out of opinions in this grand debate were, and consequently as critics of the regime would argue, the genuinely socialist character of Albania's socialist democracy.

During the Cultural and Ideological Revolution, traditional kinship links in Albania, which were centered on the patriarchal family, were shattered by the postwar repression of clan leaders, collectivization of agriculture, industrialization, migration from the countryside to urban areas, and suppression of religion. The postwar regime brought a radical change in the status of Albania's women. Considered second-class citizens in traditional Albanian society, women did most of the work at home and they also did most of the work in the fields. Before World War II, about 90% of Albania's women were illiterate, and in many areas, they were regarded as chattel under ancient tribal laws and customs. During the Cultural and Ideological Revolution, the party encouraged women to take jobs outside the home in an effort to compensate for labor shortages and overcome their conservatism. Hoxha himself proclaimed that anyone who trampled on the party's edict on women's rights should be "hurled into the fire."

=== Self-reliance ===
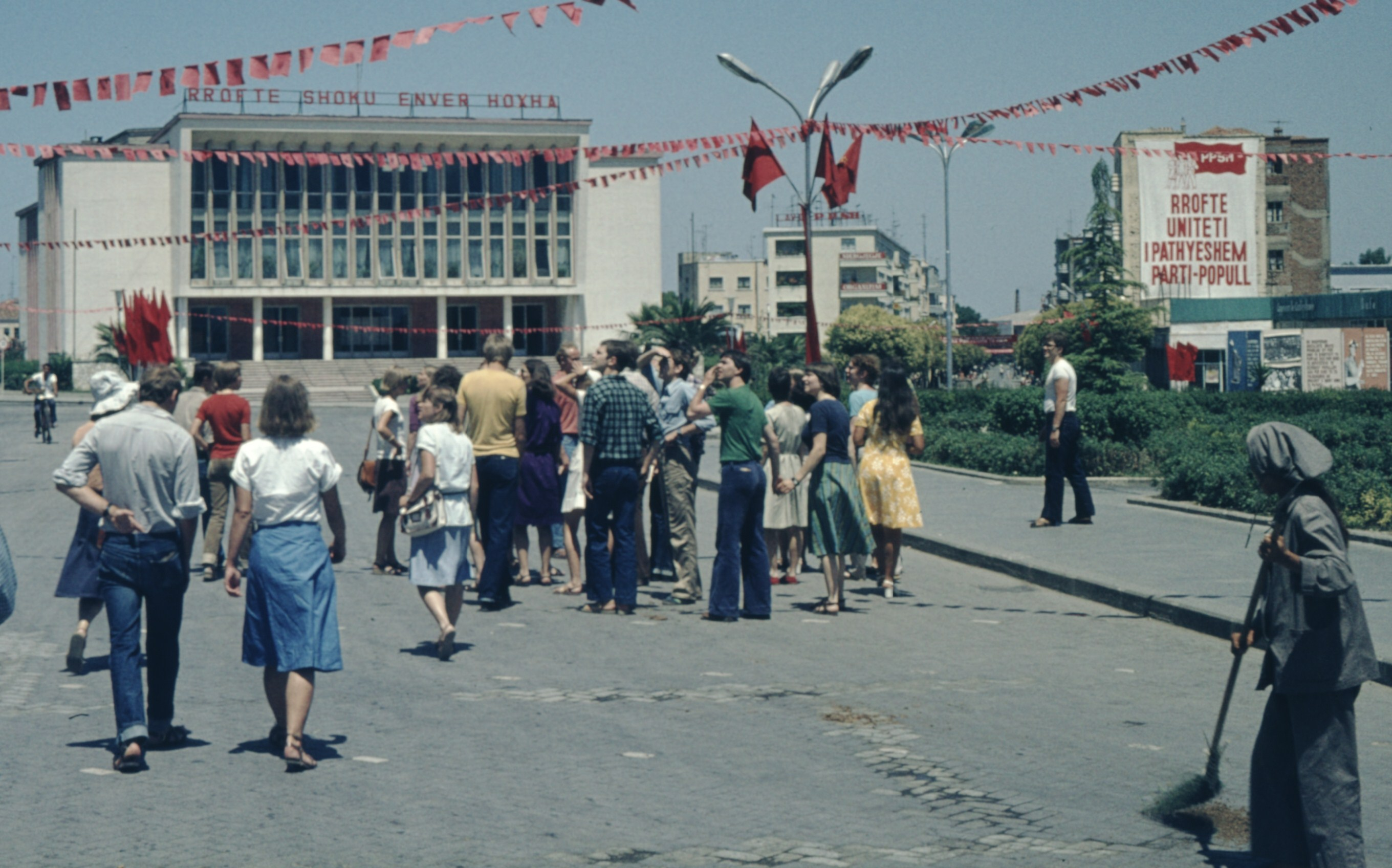
Durrës in 1978

Albanian-Chinese relations had stagnated by 1970, and when China began to reemerge from isolation and the Cultural Revolution in the early 1970s, Mao and the other Chinese leaders reassessed their commitment to Albania. In response, Albania began to broaden its contacts with the outside world. Albania opened trade negotiations with France, Italy, and the recently independent Asian and African states, and in 1971 it normalised relations with Yugoslavia and Greece. Albania's leaders abhorred the contacts of China with the United States in the early 1970s, and its press and radio ignored President Richard Nixon's trip to Beijing in 1972. Albania actively worked to reduce its dependence on China by diversifying trade and improving diplomatic and cultural relations, especially with Western Europe. But Albania shunned the Conference on Security and Cooperation in Europe, and it was the only European country that refused to take part in the Helsinki Conference of July 1975. Soon after Mao's death in 1976, Hoxha criticized the new leadership as well as Beijing's pragmatic policy towards the United States and Western Europe. China retorted by inviting Tito to visit Beijing in 1977 and ending assistance programs for Albania in 1978.

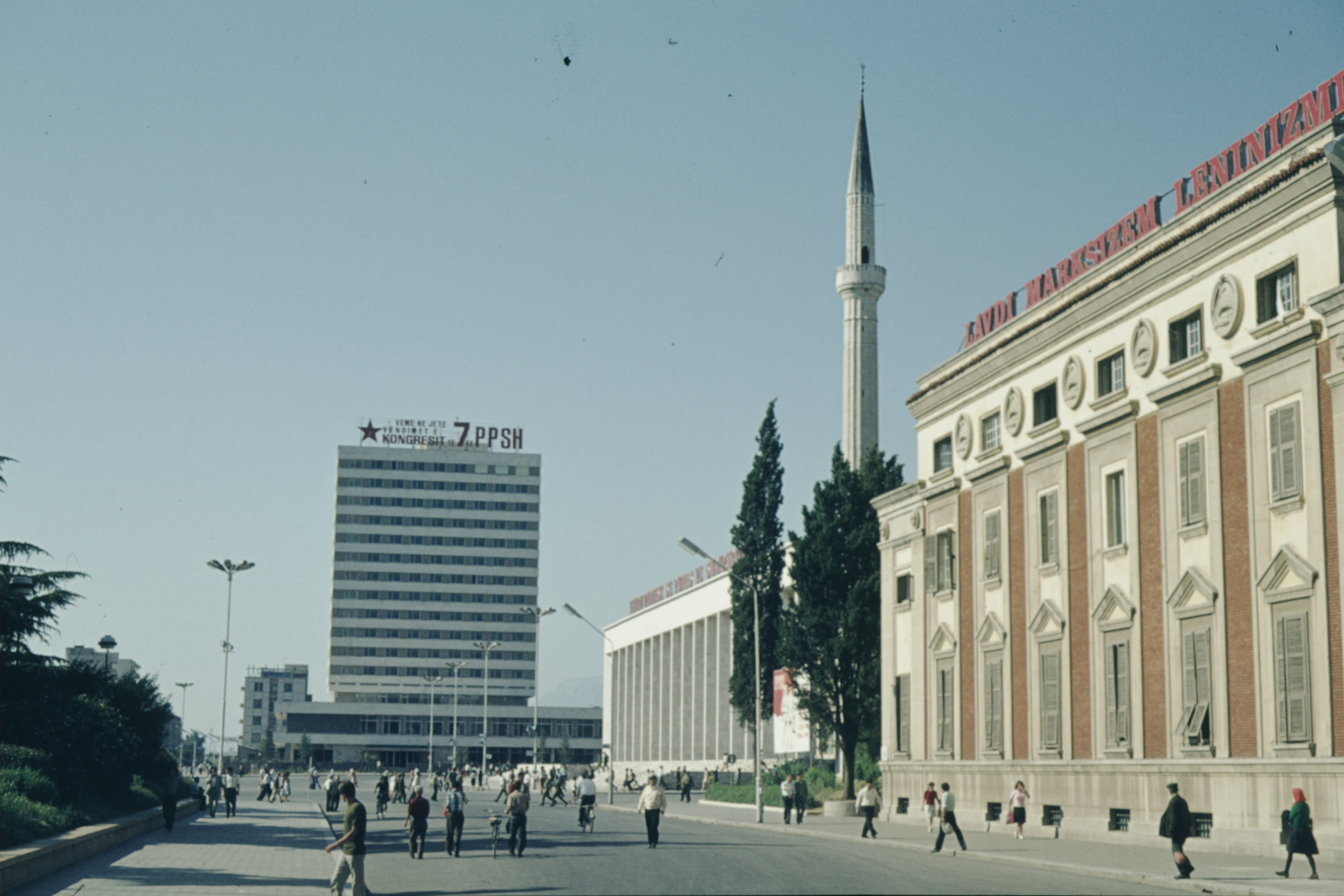
Center of Tirana in 1978, with slogans and propaganda on all of the main buildings

The Sino-Albanian split left Albania with no foreign benefactor. Albania ignored calls to normalize relations by the United States and the Soviet Union. Instead, Albania expanded its diplomatic ties with Western Europe and the developing nations, and it also began to stress the principle of self-reliance as the keystone of the country's strategy for economic development. Albania, however, did not have many resources of its own, and Hoxha's cautious opening to the outside world was not enough to bolster Albania's economy, and nascent movements for change stirred up inside Albania. Without Chinese or Soviet aid, the country began to experience widespread shortages of everything from machine parts to wheat and animal feed. Infrastructure and living standards began to collapse. According to the World Bank, Albania netted around US$750 in gross national product per capita throughout much of the 1980s. As Hoxha's health slipped, muted calls arose for the relaxation of party controls and greater openness. In response, Hoxha launched a fresh series of purges that removed the defense minister and many top military officials. A year later, Hoxha purged ministers who were responsible for the country's economy and replaced them with younger people.

As Hoxha began to experience more health problems, he progressively withdrew from state affairs and took longer and more frequent leaves of absence. Meanwhile, he began to plan an orderly succession. He worked to institutionalize his policies, hoping to frustrate any attempt which his successors might make to venture from the Stalinist path which he had blazed for Albania. In December 1976, Albania adopted its second Stalinist constitution of the postwar era. The document guaranteed Albanians freedom of speech, the press, organization, association, and assembly but subordinated these rights to the individual's duties to society as a whole. The constitution continued to emphasize national pride and unity, the idea of autarky was enshrined in law and the government was prohibited from seeking financial aid or credits or forming joint companies with partners from capitalist or revisionist communist countries. The constitution's preamble also boasted that the foundations of religious belief had been abolished in Albania.

In 1980, Hoxha tapped Ramiz Alia to succeed him as Albania's communist patriarch, overlooking his long-standing comrade-in-arms, Mehmet Shehu. Hoxha first tried to convince Shehu to voluntarily step aside, but when this move failed, Hoxha arranged for all of the members of the Politburo to rebuke him for allowing his son to become engaged to the daughter of a former bourgeois family. Shehu allegedly committed suicide on 17 December 1981. Some suspect that Hoxha had him killed. Hoxha had Shehu's wife and three sons arrested, one of whom killed himself in prison. In November 1982, Hoxha announced that Shehu had been simultaneously working as a foreign spy for the United States, British, Soviet, and Yugoslav intelligence agencies in planning the assassination of Hoxha himself. "He was buried like a dog", Hoxha wrote in the Albanian edition of his book, The Titoites.

In 1983 Hoxha relinquished many of his duties due to poor health, and Alia assumed responsibility for Albania's administration. Alia traveled around Albania extensively, standing in for Hoxha at major events and delivering addresses laying down new policies and intoning litanies to the enfeebled leader. Hoxha died on 11 April 1985. Alia was formally elected first secretary of the APL two days later. In due course, he became a dominant figure in the Albanian media, and his slogans were painted in crimson letters on signboards across the country.

=== Transition ===
After Hoxha's death, Ramiz Alia maintained firm control of the country and its security apparatus, but Albania's desperate economic situation required Alia to introduce some reforms. Continuing a policy set by Hoxha, Alia reestablished diplomatic relations with West Germany in return for development aid and also courted Italy and France. The very gradual and slight reforms intensified as Mikhail Gorbachev introduced his new policies of glasnost and perestroika in the Soviet Union, culminating in the fall of the Berlin Wall in November 1989 and the collapse of communist governments across Central and Eastern Europe.

After Nicolae Ceaușescu (the leader of Communist Romania) was executed in a revolution in December 1989, Alia expedited his reforms, apparently concerned about violence and his own fate if radical changes were not made. He signed the Helsinki Agreement (which was signed by other countries in 1975) which respected some human rights. On 11 December 1990, under enormous pressure from students and workers, Alia announced that the Party of Labor had abandoned its guaranteed right to rule, that other parties could be formed, and free elections would be held in the spring of 1991.

Alia's party won the elections on 31 March 1991—the first free elections held in decades. Nevertheless, it was clear that the change would not be stopped. The position of the communists was confirmed in the first round of elections under a 1991 interim law, but two months later, it fell during a general strike. A committee of "national salvation" took over but it also collapsed within six months. On 22 March 1992, the Communists were trumped by the Democratic Party in national elections. The change from dictatorship to democracy came with many challenges. The Democratic Party had to implement the reforms it had promised, but they were either too slow or did not solve the country's problems, so people were disappointed when their hopes for fast prosperity went unfulfilled.

In the general elections of June 1996 the Democratic Party tried to win an absolute majority by manipulating the results. This government collapsed in 1997 in the wake of additional collapses of pyramid schemes and widespread corruption, which caused chaos and rebellion throughout the country. The government attempted to suppress the rebellion by military force but the attempt failed, due to long-term corruption of the armed forces, forcing other nations to intervene. Pursuant to the 1991 interim basic law, Albanians ratified a constitution in 1998, establishing a democratic system of government based upon the rule of law and guaranteeing the protection of fundamental human rights. The name "People's Socialist Republic of Albania" was officially illegitimate after November 28, 1998 with the new Constitution of Albania, although the old communist symbols were already withdrawn and got replaced with the current coat of arms and flag of Albania.

== Government ==
During its communist era, Albania was governed by the Party of Labor of Albania which defined itself as a Stalinist party. All oppositional parties were banned and Albania was governed predominantly as a totalitarian dictatorship.

According to the Albanian constitution of 1976, legislative powers were vested in the People's Assembly, which the constitution described as "the supreme organ of state power". Its competences included directing the internal and external policies of Albania, approving and amending the constitution and laws, approving plans for economic and cultural development as well as state budget, ratifying international treaties, granting amnesty, defining the "administrative and territorial structure", and deciding on popular referendums. It also elected and dismissed the Presidium of the Peoples Assembly, the Council of Ministers, and the Supreme Court of Albania. The People's Assembly was composed of 250 deputies who were "elected in constituencies with an equal number of inhabitants" for a term of four years. It met in normal session twice per year.

The Presidium of the People's Assembly was described as "a superior organ of the state power with permanent activity" in the 1976 constitution. It was composed of a President, three Vice-Presidents, one Secretary, and ten other members.

The supreme and executive organ of the government was the Council of Ministers. They were appointed from among the ranks of the People's Assembly. Like the People's Assembly, it also had its own presidium, which was composed of a Chairman and Vice-Chairmen.

== Economy ==
Having emerged as Europe's poorest nation in the post-war period, Albania embarked on a radical economic postwar program along the lines of Stalinism.

Beginning as early as 1945, Albania issued the agrarian reform law which saw private landholdings confiscated by the state and dismantled, although the collectivization of agriculture was the slowest sector to be government-owned in Albania, due to the rugged terrain, and was not completed until 1967. In 1946, the communist regime targeted private business owners, taxing them at prohibitive levels in order to expropriate their enterprises and bring them under state control. By 1947, the state had taken control of all domestic industry.

By 1951, Albania had effectively wiped out any semblance of a market economy and instead replaced it with a centrally planned economy, modeled along the lines of Stalin's USSR. The first five year plan with Soviet assistance began, leaning on heavy industry. The State Planning Commission was the organ responsible for such endeavors and by 1959, the Soviet system of economics was fully adopted. Despite these advances, Albania frequently suffered from chronic shortages of goods and foodstuffs throughout the 1950s, despite Soviet foreign aid. As foreign aid accounted for half the Albanian economy at the time, productivity was low. The cessation of relations between Albania and the USSR damaged the Albanian economy by 1961 and the country embarked on austerity measures by 1962; in spite of this, Albania became more self-sufficient (in part due to Chinese foreign aid) in the 1960s, manufacturing its own televisions, radios, firearms, bricks, cement, light bulbs, textiles, foodstuffs, agricultural exports as well as mining chromium. By the 1970s, Albania became the third largest exporter of chromium in the world.

State enterprises, entities which were meant to generate revenue briefly operated on market terms until 1948 when they were subject to central planning as well. State Companies ranged from 700 workers to over 4,000 and typically engaged in various sectors. Despite the increased industrial output, salary cutbacks were common and wages remained very low and productivity on the lower end. By the late 1980s, due to aging equipment, the industrial base began to collapse.

In 1983, Albania imported 280 million dollars' worth of goods and exported 290 million dollars resulting in a trade surplus of US$10 million.

Between 1983 and 1988, a prolonged drought brought economic hardship because it lowered the water level in hydropower reservoirs, reducing the electricity supply needed for chromium mining. The economy was further impacted by the 1983 OPEC oil price cut.

== Legacy ==
The policies which were pursued by Enver Hoxha and his followers influenced political and economic thought around the world. Thus, Hoxhaist parties were founded in many countries and they based their ideology on Enver Hoxha's ideas as to how a communist state should be constructed and embraced his strict adherence to Marxism–Leninism. Following the fall of the People's Socialist Republic of Albania in 1991, the Hoxhaist parties regrouped as an international conference and the publication Unity and Struggle.

Encyclopædia Britannica emphasizes that "Hoxha's modernization program aimed to transform Albania from a backward agrarian country into a modern industrial society, and indeed, within four decades, Albania made respectable, even historic, progress in the development of industry, agriculture, education, arts and culture. One of the most notable achievements has been the drainage of coastal swamps-formerly breeding grounds for malaria mosquitoes-and the reclamation of land for agricultural and industrial use. The historic reform of the language, which merged elements of the Gheg and Tosk dialects into a unified literary language, was also a symbol of this change."

The overall perception of Hoxha is mixed by Albanian residents. A 2016 survey conducted by the Institute for Development Research and Alternatives (IDRA), showed that 42% of Albanians believe that Enver Hoxha had a positive impact on history – not much less than 45% who see his impact as negative. Citizens in the regions of southern and southwestern Albania that were interviewed, had the most positive view of Hoxha, with 55%. Approximately 35% of respondents said that the communist past was not a problem for them, while 62% saw it as "at least somewhat problematic".

In some Albanian academic circles, Hoxha's legacy is viewed more negatively, with many noting his repressive means of governance, isolation, and political persecution of 100,000 Albanians under his totalitarian rule.

== List of leaders ==
First Secretaries of the Party of Labour of Albania:

- Enver Hoxha (1946–1985)
- Ramiz Alia (1985–1991)

Chairmen of the Presidium of the People's Assembly:

- Omer Nishani (1946–1953)
- Haxhi Lleshi (1953–1982)
- Ramiz Alia (1982–1991)

Prime Ministers:

- Enver Hoxha (1946–1954)
- Mehmet Shehu (1954–1981)
- Adil Çarçani (1981–1991)

== Military ==
The Albanian People's Army (Albanian: Ushtria Popullore Shqiptare, UPSh) was the term for the national army of the People's Socialist Republic of Albania from 1946 to 1990. After withdrawing from Warsaw Pact activities in 1968, it conducted a self-reliance policy for national defence. It was dissolved in 1990 and is retained in its current form through the Albanian Armed Forces.

Socialist Albania's Military Equipment
Name	Image	Origin	Number	Notes
Tanks
T-34/85		Soviet Union	190	Serviceability doubtful
Type-59		China	190	Serviceability doubtful
Type-62		China	N/A	
Tank Destroyers
SU-76		Soviet Union	N/A	(Kept in reserve).
SU-100		Soviet Union	N/A	
Armoured Fighting Vehicles
BA-64		Soviet Union	N/A	(Kept in reserve).
Armoured Personnel Carriers
Type-63		China	N/A	
Type-77		China	N/A	
Armoured Recovery Vehicles
T-34-T		Soviet Union	N/A	
Type 73		China	N/A	
Amphibious Transport Vehicles
BAV 385		Soviet Union	N/A	
Bridgelayers
Jiefang CA30		China	N/A	
Artillery Tractors
AT-S		Soviet Union	N/A	
AT-T		Soviet Union	N/A	
Type-60-1		China	N/A	
Heavy Mortars
120mm 120-PM-38		Soviet Union	N/A	
120mm 120-PM-43		Soviet Union	N/A	
160mm M160		Soviet Union	N/A	
160mm Type-56		China	N/A	
Towed Artillery
76mm ZiS-3		Soviet Union	N/A	
76mm M-1943		Soviet Union	N/A	
85mm D-44		Soviet Union	N/A	
100mm BS-3		Soviet Union	N/A	
122mm M-30		Soviet Union	N/A	
122mm Type-54		China	N/A	
122mm Type-60		China	N/A	
130mm Type-59		China	N/A	
130mm Type-59-I		China	N/A	
130mm SM-4-1		Soviet Union	N/A	
152mm ML-20		Soviet Union	N/A	
152mm D-1		Soviet Union	N/A	
152mm Type-66		China	N/A	
Multiple Rocket Launchers
107mm Type-63		China	N/A	(Towed).
107mm Type-63		China	N/A	(Jeep-Based).
130mm Type-63		China	N/A	
132mm BM-13 'Katyusha'		Soviet Union	N/A	
Anti-Aircraft Guns
12.7mm DShK		Soviet Union	N/A	
12.7mm Type-54		China	N/A	
14.5mm ZPU-2		Soviet Union	N/A	
14.5mm ZPU-4		Soviet Union	N/A	
14.5mm Type-56		China	N/A	
37mm M-1939		Soviet Union	N/A	
37mm Type-65		China	N/A	
57mm AZP S-60		Soviet Union	N/A	
85mm 52-K M1939		Soviet Union	N/A	
100mm KS-19		Soviet Union	N/A	
100mm Type-59		China	N/A	
Static Surface-To-Air Missile Systems
HQ-2		China	~4 sites, 22 launchers	
Radars
P-35		Soviet Union	N/A	
SNR-75		China	N/A	(For HQ-2), (Not yet seen).
SON-9		China	N/A	(For 57mm S-60 and 100mm KS-19 AA guns).
Utility Vehicles
GAZ-69		Soviet Union	N/A	
Beijing BJ212		China	N/A	
ARO 244		Romania	N/A	
Trucks
Berliet GBC8 MT		France	N/A	
ZiL-151		Soviet Union	N/A	
Jiefang CA10		China	N/A	
Jiefang CA30		China	N/A	
Yuejin NJ-130		China	N/A	
IFA W 50		East Germany	N/A	

== See also ==
- Bunkers in Albania
- Islam in the People's Socialist Republic of Albania
- Institute for the Integration of Former Political Victims
- Fall of communism in Albania
- History of Albania
- Captive Nations
