= 29th Kuvendi =

Twenty-ninth Legislature of Albania Legjislatura e njëzet e nëntë e Shqipërisë
- XXIX Legislature; VIII Pluralist Legislature

Type
- Type: Unicameral
- Term limits: Four years

History
- Founded: September 9, 2013
- Disbanded: September 10, 2017
- Preceded by: 28th Legislature
- Succeeded by: 30th Legislature

Leadership
- Chairman of the Parliament: Ilir Meta, LSI
- Prime Minister: Edi Rama

Structure
- Seats: 140 deputies
- Political groups: Government (83): PS (65); LSI (16); PBDNJ (1); PKDSH (1); Opposition (57): PD (50); PDIU (4); PR (3)

Elections
- Last election: 23 June 2013

Website
- www.parlament.al

The Twenty-ninth Legislature of Albania (Albanian: Legjislatura e Njëzet e nëntë e Shqipërisë), officially known as the VIII Pluralist Legislature of Albania (Albanian: Legjislatura e VIII Pluraliste e Shqipërisë), is the legislature of Albania following the 2013 general election of Members of Parliament (MPs) to the Albanian Parliament. (Note: A direct dictionary translation would be "Assembly." However, the Albanian government uses the translation "Parliament.") The party of the Prime Minister Edi Rama, PS, with its coalition partners obtained an absolute majority of 83.

== Composition of the Parliament ==
=== Election of chairperson ===
==== Procedure for election of the Chairperson of the Parliament ====
The procedure for the election of the Chairperson is foreseen by the Article 6 of Parliament's Rules which states that:

1. A candidate for Chairperson of the Parliament shall be nominated by at least 15 deputies. An MP can not support more than one candidate. The proposal should be made with writing, contains the relevant signatures and is submitted to the Provisional Secretariat of Parliament.
2. The Chairperson of the Parliament shall be elected without debate and by secret ballot, by majority vote, in the presence of more than half of all members of the Parliament. If none of the candidates has won the required majority, it is followed by a second round, where they vote for the two candidates that have received the most votes.
3. Voting is publicly organized and chaired by a 5-member Voting Committee that reflects, as far as possible, the political composition of the Parliament. The oldest member by age also exercises the function of the Chairperson the Voting Committee and announce the voting results.
4. The Speaker of the session immediately invites the elected Chairperson of the Parliament to take his place.

==== Critics and pre-election process ====
On September 13, 2013, which was the inauguration day of the VI Legislature of the Albanian Parliament, began the morning with the oath of the 140 new deputies elected in the general elections of June 23, 2013.

On the afternoon of the same day, a second session was called for the election of the new Chairperson of the Parliament of Albania.

==== Voting Session ====
The voting session in parliament. There were 140 deputies in the session. Ilir Meta was elected Chairman of the Parliament with 91 votes in favor and 45 votes against.

Voting for Chairperson of the Parliament
Pro	Against	Abstentions
91 votes	45 votes	4 vote
Total of 140 votes.

=== Parliamentary groups ===
- Parliamentary Group of the Socialist Party

The parliamentary group of the Socialist Party of Albania is chaired by Mr. Gramoz Ruci, who is the leader of this parliamentary group in the previous legislature of the Parliament. The Socialist Party's parliamentary group consists with a total of 65 deputies, emerged from the June 2013 elections; thus obtaining the majority in the Parliament of Albania with its coalition partner the socialist Movement for integration.

- Parliamentary Group of the Democratic Party

The parliamentary group of the Democratic Party of Albania consists of 50 deputies, emerged from the June 2013 elections. It is the second largest group in the Albanian Parliament and is chaired by Mr. Edi Paloka. Despite the fact that the Democratic Party won 50 deputies in the general elections of June 2013 Losing 18 seats.

- Parliamentary Group of the Socialist Movement for Integration

The parliamentary group of the Socialist Movement for Integration consists of 16 deputies elected in the June 2013 general elections, in which LSI was represented under the electoral alliance with Socialist party and prior being allied with the Democratic Party; and its former ally in the previous legislature. The group is chaired by Mr. Luan Rama.

- Parliamentary Group of the Justice, Integration and Unity

The Party for Justice, Integration and Unity was represented by Shpëtim Idrizi. Who was a member of the Socialist Party of Albania. The PDIU was a merger party between Party for Justice and Integration and the Party for Justice and Unity. The PDIU during the 2013 elections. Had joined the Democratic Party of Albania and its electoral alliance.

- Parliamentary Group of the Republican Party

The Republican Party was represented in the June 2013 elections under the Alliance for Employment, Prosperity and Integration on the basis of a pre-election political agreement between the allied parties in the opposition, Central Election Commission. The party is led by Fatmir Mediu.

=== Bureau of the Parliament ===
The Parliament Bureau pursues and decides the administrative issues and the interior functioning of the Parliament and of its bodies. The Bureau of Parliament is composed of the Chairperson of the Parliament, the Deputy Chairpersons, two secretaries on the budget and four secretaries. The bureau is led by the chairperson. The composition of the Bureau of Parliament must reflect, as much as possible, the political composition of the Parliament. It cannot be elected more than one secretary on budget or secretary from the same parliamentary group. One Deputy Chairperson must belong to the biggest opposition party.

The Chairperson of Parliament consults with the leaders of the parliamentary groups about the composition of the Bureau. The composition of the Parliament Bureau is agreed upon with consensus in the meeting of the chairperson with the parliamentary groups' leaders. The Chairperson proposes to vote it at the plenary sitting, which takes the decision with open voting.

The Bureau decides on the budget of the Parliament based on the proposals of the secretaries on the budget; decides on the complaints in the cases of the constitution of the parliamentary groups and the complaints of the parliamentary groups on the composition of the standing committees of the Parliament.

The Bureau of Parliament, with the proposal of the Secretary General, approves the Internal Regulation on Organization and Functioning of Parliament Services. The Bureau of Parliament issues the orders and regulations regarding:

- the organization of the services in the Parliament and the assigned tasks to all its sections in compliance with the functioning of the Parliament.
- the legal status, the economic treatment and conditions of services to all the Parliament's employees.

The Bureau examines and decides about the disciplinary measures proposed by the Chairperson of the Parliament according to the Article 65/2 of the Parliament Rule. The Bureau of Parliament, with the proposal of the Chairperson of Parliament, appoints the Secretary General of Parliament on the basis of three candidatures from the competition procedures according to the law on civil service. It can approves the annual report of the Parliament's activity prepared by the Secretary General and decides on its publication.

== Composition of the Parliament ==
The Constitution of Albania mandates that the Parliament consists of not less than 140 members, elected by a direct elected secret ballot for four-year terms. The electoral system is closed list proportional representation. There are 12 multi-member constituencies corresponding to the 12 administrative regions of the country. Parliamentary elections are held within 60 days to 30 days before the end of the mandate and not later than 45 days after dissolution.

As specified by the current electoral legislation in Albania, 140 members of the Parliament are elected in multi-seat constituencies. Within any constituency, parties must meet a threshold of 3 percent of votes, and pre-election coalitions must meet a threshold of 5 percent of votes.

=== 29th Parliament ===
The two largest political parties in Albania are the Socialist Party (PS) and the Democratic Party (PD). The last elections were held on 23 June 2013. Following is a list of political parties with representation in the Parliament by the 2013 Albanian parliamentary election:

Name	Abbr.	Founded	Leader	Ideology	MPs
Socialist Party of Albania; Partia Socialiste e Shqipërisë	PS	15 August 1991	Edi Rama	Social democracy, Third Way, Progressive, Centre-left, Western, Modernism, Social liberalism	65 / 140
Democratic Party of Albania; Partia Demokratike e Shqipërisë	PD	19 December 1990	Lulzim Basha	Liberal conservatism, Conservatism, Nationalism, Pro-Europeanism, Centre-right, Economic liberalism	50 / 140
Socialist Movement for Integration; Lëvizja Socialiste për Intigrim	LSI	23 September 2004	Ilir Meta	Social democracy, Progressivism, Centre-left	16 / 140
Party for Justice, Integration and Unity; Partia për Drejtësi, Integrim dhe Unitet	PDIU	1 March 2011	Shpëtim Idrizi	Nationalism, Right-wing, Ethnic nationalism, Cham issue	4 / 140
Republican party of Albania; Partia Republikane e Shqipërisë	PR	10 January 1991	Fatmir Mediu	National conservatism, Right-wing, Social conservatism, Pro-Europeanism	3 / 140
Unity for Human Rights Party; Partia Bashkimi për të Drejtat e Njeriut	PBDNJ	1992	Vangjel Dule	Social Liberalism, Greek minority interests, Centre	1 / 140
Christian Democratic Party of Albania; Partia Kristian Demokrate e Shqipërisë	PKDSH	26 March 2013	Dhimitër Muslia	Christian democracy, Centre-right	1 / 140

== List of MPs elected in the general election ==
The following is a list of 140 members elected to the parliament in the 2013 general election. It consists of the representative's name, party, and they are divided according to the 12 constituencies of Albania to which they belong, in addition to noting members assigned to government, resigned or deceased, with their parliamentary functions, chair and deputy chairs of standing committees and parliamentary leaders of the parties.

Thirteen representatives are members of Rama I Cabinet and a fourteenth its elected as Chairperson of the Parliament. MP's can exercise the function of the minister and at the same time hold the post of deputy.

=== Partia Demokratike ===
1. Albina Deda
2. Aldo Bumçi
3. Alban Zeneli
4. Albana Vokshi
5. Arben Imami
6. Arben Ristani
7. Ardian Turku
8. Astrit Patozi
9. Astrit Veliaj
10. Bedri Hoxha
11. Bedri Mihaj
12. Besnik Dushaj
13. Dashamir Shehi
14. Edi Paloka
15. Edmond Spaho
16. Eduard Halimi
17. Eduard Selami
18. Eleina Qirici
19. Flamur Noka
20. Florjon Mima
21. Genc Pollo
22. Genc Ruli
23. Gent Strazimiri
24. Gerti Bogdani
25. Gjergji Papa
26. Gjovalin Bzhetaj
27. Halim Kosova
28. Helidon Bushati
29. Igli Cara
30. Jorida Tabaku
31. Jozefina Topalli
32. Kastriot Islami
33. Keltis Kruja
34. Kozma Dashi
35. Liljana Elmazi
36. Luçiano Boçi
37. Majlinda Bregu
38. Mesila Doda
39. Myqerem Tafaj
40. Oerd Bylykbashi
41. Ridvan Bode
42. Roland Keta
43. Sali Berisha
44. Sokol Olldashi
45. Sherefedin Shehu
46. Voltana Ademi
47. Shpëtim Idrizi
48. Gjovalin Kadeli

=== Partia Socialiste ===
1. Adelina Rista
2. Alfred Peza
3. Anastas Angjeli
4. Andrea Marto
5. Anduel Xhindi
6. Anila Agalliu
7. Arben Ndoka
8. Arben Çuko
9. Armando Prenga
10. Armando Subashi
11. Arta Dade
12. Artan Gaçi
13. Bashkim Fino
14. Ben Blushi
15. Besnik Baraj
16. Blendi Klosi
17. Blerina Gjylameti
18. Dashamir Kamberi
19. Dashamir Peza
20. Eduard Bejko
21. Eduard Shalsi
22. Enkelejda Shkreli
23. Erion Braçe
24. Erion Veliaj
25. Erjeta Alhysa
26. Ervin Bushati
27. Ervin Koçi
28. Esmeralda Shkjau
29. Fatmir Toçi
30. Fatmir Xhafa
31. Fidel Ylli
32. Gentian Bejko
33. Gramoz Ruçi
34. Ilir Beqaj
35. Ilir Xhakolli
36. Ilirjan Pendavinji
37. Klodiana Spahiu
38. Koço Kokëdhima
39. Luiza Xhuvani
40. Luljeta Arapi
41. Majlinda Bufi
42. Mimoza Hafizi
43. Mimi Kodhelin
44. Musa Ulqini
45. Namik Dokle
46. Namik Kopliku
47. Olta Xhaçka
48. Pandeli Majko
49. Parid Cara
50. Paulin Stërkaj
51. Piro Lutaj
52. Pjerin Ndreu
53. Rakip Suli
54. Sadri Abazi
55. Shkëlqim Cani
56. Saimir Tahiri
57. Taulant Balla
58. Tom Doshi
59. Valentina Leskaj
60. Vasilika Hysi
61. Vexhi Muçmata
62. Vladimir Kosta
63. Xhemal Qefalia
64. Ylli Ziçishti
65. Damian Gjiknuri

=== Lëvizja Socialiste për Integrim ===
1. Agron Çela
2. Bujar Derveni
3. Bujar Kollgjeri
4. Gledion Rehovica
5. Gjovalin Kadeli
6. Ilir Meta
7. Kejdi Mehmetaj
8. Luan Rama
9. Monika Kryemadhi
10. Petrit Vasili
11. Përparim Spahiu
12. Piro Kapurani
13. Robert Bitri
14. Silva Caka
15. Spartak Braho
16. Shkëlqim Selami
17. Vangjel Tavo

=== Partia Republikane ===
1. Agron Duka
2. Fatmir Mediu
3. Ylli Shehu

=== Partia për Drejtësi, Integrim dhe Unitet ===
1. Aqif Rakipi
2. Dashamir Tahiri
3. Omer Mamo
4. Tahir Muhedini

== See also ==
- Parliament of Albania
- 2013 Albanian parliamentary election
