= 30th Kuvendi =

Thirtieth Legislature of Albania Legjislatura e tridhjetë e Shqipërisë
- XXX Legislature; IX Pluralist Legislature

Type
- Type: Unicameral
- Term limits: Four years

History
- Founded: September 9, 2017
- Disbanded: September 10, 2021
- Preceded by: 29th Legislature
- Succeeded by: 31st Legislature

Leadership
- Chairman of the Parliament: Gramoz Ruçi, PS
- Prime Minister: Edi Rama

Structure
- Seats: 140 deputies
- Political groups: Government (74): PS (74); Supported by (4): PSD (1); PDIU (3); Opposition (62): PD (43); LSI (19)

Elections
- Last election: 25 June 2017

Website
- www.parlament.al

The Thirtieth Legislature of Albania (Albanian: Legjislatura e tridhjetë e Shqipërisë), officially known as the IX Pluralist Legislature of Albania (Albanian: Legjislatura e IX Pluraliste e Shqipërisë), is the legislature of Albania following the 2017 general election of Members of Parliament (MPs) to the Albanian Parliament. (Note: A direct dictionary translation would be "Assembly." However, the Albanian government uses the translation "Parliament.") The party of the Prime Minister Edi Rama, PS, obtained an absolute majority of 74 deputies, alongside its ally, the Social Democratic Party (PSD), which secured 1 seat and Party for Justice, Integration and Unity (PDIU) 3 seats.

== Composition of the Parliament ==
=== Election of chairperson ===
==== Procedure for election of the Chairperson of the Parliament ====
The procedure for the election of the Chairperson is foreseen by the Article 6 of Parliament's Rules which states that:

1. A candidate for Chairperson of the Parliament shall be nominated by at least 15 deputies. An MP can not support more than one candidate. The proposal should be made with writing, contains the relevant signatures and is submitted to the Provisional Secretariat of Parliament.
2. The Chairperson of the Parliament shall be elected without debate and by secret ballot, by majority vote, in the presence of more than half of all members of the Parliament. If none of the candidates has won the required majority, it is followed by a second round, where they vote for the two candidates that have received the most votes.
3. Voting is publicly organized and chaired by a 5-member Voting Committee that reflects, as far as possible, the political composition of the Parliament. The oldest member by age also exercises the function of the Chairperson the Voting Committee and announce the voting results.
4. The Speaker of the session immediately invites the elected Chairperson of the Parliament to take his place.

==== Critics and pre-election process ====
On September 9, 2017, which was the inauguration day of the IX Legislature of the Albanian Parliament, began the morning with the oath of the 140 new deputies elected in the general elections of June 25, 2017.

On the afternoon of the same day, a second session was called for the election of the new Chairperson of the Parliament of Albania.

Only the Socialist Party, which was the winner of the elections, made a proposal for the post of the Chairman of parliament. The PS proposed Mr. Gramoz Ruçi, who is one of the long-standing MPs in the pluralist Albanian parliamentary history. His candidacy received prior consensus from PDIU and the PSD parties.

While the biggest opposition party PD opposed Ruçi's as candidature as chairman with the claim that he was a Sigurimi employee and Minister of Internal Affairs at the end of the communist dictatorship.

The Democratic Party along with ex-politically persecuted people who protested outside the parliament the election of Mr. Ruçi's as Chairman of the Parliament, by linking him with the murder of 4 protesters killed by the police in Shkodër on 2 April 1991, time Mr. Ruçi was Minister of Internal Affairs.

==== Voting Session ====
The voting session in parliament was chaired by the oldest parliamentary deputy of parliament, who was Mr. Besnik Bare. There were 121 deputies in the session, since the 19 deputies of the Socialist Movement for Integration were absent, due to the objections they had with the proposal by the Socialist Party. Mr. Ruci was elected Chairman of the Parliament with 80 votes in favor and 40 votes against.

Voting for Chairperson of the Parliament
Pro	Against	Abstentions
80 votes	40 votes	0 vote
Total of 121 votes, of which 1 invalid vote.

=== Parliamentary groups ===
Deputies can form parliamentary groups according to party affiliation or political orientation. Within 3 days from the date of election of the Chairperson of the Parliament, each MP declares, in writing, membership in a parliamentary group. Deputies elected during the legislature make the declaration within 3 days of the oath. A minimum of 7 MPs is required for the creation of a parliamentary group. Every MP may only be a member of a parliamentary group. A member leaving the parliamentary group may join another parliamentary group only after six months from the date of leaving from the actual parliamentary group. Each parliamentary group, at its first meeting, chooses its leadership.

- Parliamentary Group of the Socialist Party

The parliamentary group of the Socialist Party of Albania is chaired by Mr. Taulant Balla, who replaces in this position Mr. Gramoz Ruci, who was the leader of this parliamentary group in the previous legislature of the Parliament. The Socialist Party's parliamentary group consists with a total of 74 deputies, emerged from the June 2017 elections; thus obtaining the absolute majority in the Parliament of Albania.

- Parliamentary Group of the Democratic Party

The parliamentary group of the Democratic Party of Albania consists of 33 deputies, emerged from the June 2017 elections. It is the second largest group in the Albanian Parliament and is chaired by Mr. Edmond Spaho who replaces the former leader of the group for previous legislature, Mr. Edi Paloka. Despite the fact that the Democratic Party won 43 deputies in the general elections of June 2017, they are not included DP parliamentary group because some of them are leaders of the ally parties (such as PR; PDK; PBDNJ etc.) of the DP; based on a political agreement made between the allied parties before the elections, they decide to be represented in a single list to increase the chances of winning in some constituencies.

- Parliamentary Group of the Socialist Movement for Integration

The parliamentary group of the Socialist Movement for Integration consists of 19 deputies elected in the June 2017 general elections, in which LSI was represented solely by challenging the two traditional parties, such as the Democratic Party; and its former ally in the previous legislature, the Socialist Party. The group is chaired by Mr. Petrit Vasili, who is also the deputy chairman of LSI.

- Parliamentary Group of the Republican Party

The Republican Party was not represented in the June 2017 elections under its own name, but some of its candidacies were included in the PD list on the basis of a pre-election political agreement between the allied parties in the opposition, which was then submitted to the Central Election Commission. However, after the constitution of the parliament, the Republican Party created its own parliamentary group consisting of 7 deputies. The group is chaired by Mr. Fatmir Mediu, who is also the chairman of the party.

- MPs not included in Parliamentary Groups

There are 7 deputies who are not involved in any of the parliamentary groups formed after the parliament constitution. Three of them belong to the Party for Justice, Integration and Unity, which failed to obtain the quorum needed (7 MPs) to form its own group. One MP belong to Social Democratic Party, Mr. Tom Doshi.

There are also three leaders of allied parties of the Democratic Party who were elected from its list in the June 2017 elections, but who decided not included themselves in the DP Parliamentary Group. They are: Dashamir Shehi chairman of the Movement for National Development (LZHK); Nard Ndoka chairman of the Demochristian Party (PDK); Vangjel Dule chairman of the Unity for Human Rights Party (PBDNJ).

=== Bureau of the Parliament ===
The Parliament Bureau pursues and decides the administrative issues and the interior functioning of the Parliament and of its bodies. The Bureau of Parliament is composed by the Chairperson of the Parliament, the Deputy Chairpersons, two secretaries on the budget and four secretaries. The bureau its led by the Chairperson. The composition of the Bureau of Parliament must reflect, as much as possible, the political composition of the Parliament. It cannot be elected more than one secretary on budget or secretary from the same parliamentary group. One Deputy Chairperson must belong to the biggest opposition party.

The Chairperson of Parliament consults with the leaders of the parliamentary groups about the composition of the Bureau. The composition of the Parliament Bureau is agreed upon with consensus in the meeting of the Chairperson with the parliamentary groups' leaders. The Chairperson proposes to vote it at the plenary sitting, which takes the decision with open voting.

The Bureau decides on the budget of the Parliament based on the proposals of the secretaries on the budget; decides on the complaints in the cases of the constitution of the parliamentary groups and the complaints of the parliamentary groups on the composition of the standing committees of the Parliament.

The Bureau of Parliament, with the proposal of the Secretary General, approves the Internal Regulation on Organization and Functioning of Parliament Services. The Bureau of Parliament issues the orders and regulations regarding:

- the organization of the services in the Parliament and the assigned tasks to all its sections in compliance with the functioning of the Parliament.
- the legal status, the economic treatment and conditions of services to all the Parliament's employees.

The Bureau examines and decides about the disciplinary measures proposed by the Chairperson of the Parliament according to the Article 65/2 of the Parliament Rule. The Bureau of Parliament, with the proposal of the Chairperson of Parliament, appoints the Secretary General of Parliament on the basis of three candidatures from the competition procedures according to the law on civil service. It can approves the annual report of the Parliament's activity prepared by the Secretary General and decides on its publication.

== Composition of the Parliament ==
The Constitution of Albania mandates that the Parliament consists of not less than 140 members, elected by a direct elected secret ballot for four-year terms. The electoral system is closed list proportional representation. There are 12 multi-member constituencies corresponding to the 12 administrative regions of the country. Parliamentary elections are held within 60 days to 30 days before the end of the mandate and not later than 45 days after dissolution.

As specified by the current electoral legislation in Albania, 140 members of the Parliament are elected in multi-seat constituencies. Within any constituency, parties must meet a threshold of 3 percent of votes, and pre-election coalitions must meet a threshold of 5 percent of votes.

=== 31st Parliament ===
The two largest political parties in Albania are the Socialist Party (PS) and the Democratic Party (PD). The last elections were held on 25 June 2017. Following is a list of political parties with representation in the Parliament by the 2017 Albanian parliamentary election:

Logo	Name	Abbr.	Founded	Leader	Ideology	MPs
	Socialist Party of Albania; Partia Socialiste e Shqipërisë	PS	15 August 1991	Edi Rama	Social democracy, Third Way, Progressive, Centre-left, Western, Modernism, Social liberalism	74 / 140
	Democratic Party of Albania; Partia Demokratike e Shqipërisë	PD	19 December 1990	Lulzim Basha	Liberal conservatism, Conservatism, Nationalism, Pro-Europeanism, Centre-right, Economic liberalism	43 / 140
	Socialist Movement for Integration; Lëvizja Socialiste për Intigrim	LSI	23 September 2004	Monika Kryemadhi	Social democracy, Progressivism, Centre-left	19 / 140
	Party for Justice, Integration and Unity; Partia për Drejtësi, Integrim dhe Unitet	PDIU	1 March 2011	Shpëtim Idrizi	Nationalism, Right-wing, Ethnic nationalism, Cham issue	3 / 140
	Social Democratic Party of Albania; Partia Socialdemokrate e Shqipërisë	PSD	23 April 1991	Ëngjëll Bejtaj	Social democracy, Centre-left	1 / 140

=== Post-February 2019 parliamentary composition ===
During the political crisis, opposition parties announced that all their MP's in the Parliament would resign from the parliament on 22 February, more than 40 seats were vacated and the Central Elections Commission started in the following days the procedures to replace the MP's with mostly unknown and inexperienced figures that were part of the candidate lists during the 2017 election.

After weeks of filling the vacancies, in the end the parliament had this composition.

Logo	Name	Abbr.	Founded	Leader	Ideology	MPs
	Socialist Party of Albania; Partia Socialiste e Shqipërisë	PS	15 August 1991	Edi Rama	Social democracy, Third Way, Progressive, Centre-left, Western, Modernism, Social liberalism	74 / 140
	Party for Justice, Integration and Unity; Partia për Drejtësi, Integrim dhe Unitet	PDIU	1 March 2011	Shpëtim Idrizi	Nationalism, Right-wing, Ethnic nationalism, Cham issue	3 / 140
	Social Democratic Party of Albania; Partia Socialdemokrate e Shqipërisë	PSD	23 April 1991	Ëngjëll Bejtaj	Social democracy, Centre-left	1 / 140
	Democratic Group; Grupi Demokrat					8 / 140
	Right-wing group Grupi partitë e djathta					7 / 140
	Independent; Të Pavarur					9 / 140
	Vacant Seats					18 / 140

== List of MPs elected in the general election ==
The following is a list of 140 members elected to the parliament in the 2017 general election. It consists of the representative's name, party, and they are divided according to the 12 constituencies of Albania to which they belong, in addition to noting members assigned to government, resigned or deceased, with their parliamentary functions, chair and deputy chairs of standing committees and parliamentary leaders of the parties.

Thirteen representatives are members of Rama II Cabinet and a fourteenth its elected as Chairperson of the Parliament. MP's can exercise the function of the minister and at the same time hold the post of deputy.

County	Full name	Party	Notes
Berat County	Adnor Shameti	PS	
Berat County	Blendi Klosi	PS	Minister of Tourism and Environment in Rama's II Cabinet.
Berat County	Eduard Halimi	PD	Deputy Chair of the Committee on Legal Affairs, Public Administration and Human Rights
Berat County	Ermonela Velikaj (Felaj)	PS	Chair of the Committee on National Security
Berat County	Fadil Nasufi	PS	
Berat County	Gledjon Rehovica	LSI	
Berat County	Nasip Naço	LSI	
Dibër County	Almira Xhembulla	PS	
Dibër County	Dhurata Çupi	PD	
Dibër County	Ilir Beqaj	PS	
Dibër County	Përparim Spahiu	LSI	
Dibër County	Reme Lala	PDIU	
Dibër County	Xhemal Gjunkshi	PD	
Durrës County	Edi Paloka	PD	
Durrës County	Eglantina Gjermeni	PS	
Durrës County	Fatbardha Kadiu	PD	
Durrës County	Fidel Ylli	PS	
Durrës County	Florjon Mima	PD	Deputy Chair of the Committee on Production Activities, Trade and Environment
Durrës County	Ilir Ndraxhi	PS	
Durrës County	Jurgis Çyrbja	PS	
Durrës County	Klodiana Spahiu	PS	
Durrës County	Lefter Koka	LSI	
Durrës County	Milva Ekonomi	PS	Deputy Chair of the Committee on Education and Public Information
Durrës County	Nora Malaj	LSI	
Durrës County	Oerd Bylykbashi	PD	
Durrës County	Rolant Xhelilaj	PS	
Durrës County	Rrahman Rraja	PS	
Elbasan County	Anastas Angjeli	PS	
Elbasan County	Aqif Rakipi	PDIU	
Elbasan County	Vacancy	PDIU	After the resignation of MP Bujar Muça
Elbasan County	Arben Kamami	PS	
Elbasan County	Edmond Haxhinasto	LSI	
Elbasan County	Edmond Spaho	PD	Leader of the Parliamentary Group of Democratic Party
Elbasan County	Endri Hasa	PD	
Elbasan County	Elvis Kushi	PS	
Elbasan County	Luan Duzha	PS	
Elbasan County	Luçiano Boçi	PD	
Elbasan County	Monika Kryemadhi	LSI	
Elbasan County	Musa Ulqini	PS	
Elbasan County	Nuri Belba	PS	
Elbasan County	Taulant Balla	PS	Leader of the Parliamentary Group of Socialist Party
Fier County	Adelina Rista	PS	
Fier County	Anduel Xhindi	PS	
Fier County	Antoneta Dhima	PS	
Fier County	Bashkim Fino	PS	
Fier County	Bujar Çela	PS	
Fier County	Enkelejd Alibeaj	PD	
Fier County	Erion Braçe	PS	Chair of the Committee on Economy and Finance
Fier County	Genc Pollo	PD	
Fier County	Gramoz Ruçi	PS	Chairperson of the Parliament of Albania
Fier County	Ismet Beqiraj	PS	
Fier County	Luan Baci	PD	
Fier County	Myslim Murrizi	PD	
Fier County	Petrit Vasili	LSI	Chair of the Committee on Labour, Social Affairs and Health; Leader of the Parliamentary Group of Socialist Movement for Integration
Fier County	Robert Bitri	LSI	
Fier County	Tatjana Piro (Nurçe)	PS	
Fier County	Xhevit Bushaj	PS	
Gjirokastër County	Bledar Çuçi	PS	Deputy Chair of the Committee on European Integration
Gjirokastër County	Flamur Golemi	PS	
Gjirokastër County	Mirela Kumbaro Furxhi	PS	Ministry of Culture in Rama's II Cabinet.
Gjirokastër County	Tritan Shehu	PD	
Gjirokastër County	Vangjel Tavo	LSI	
Korçë County	Edlira Bode	PS	
Korçë County	Edmond Panariti	LSI	
Korçë County	Eduard Shalsi	PS	Chair of the Committee on Production Activities, Trade and Environment
Korçë County	Elisa Spiropali	PS	Deputy Chair of the Committee on Labour, Social Affairs and Health
Korçë County	Ervin Salianji	PD	
Korçë County	Hekuran Hoxhalli	PD	
Korçë County	Ilir Xhakolli	PS	
Korçë County	Ilirian Pandavinji	PS	
Korçë County	Klevis Balliu	PD	
Korçë County	Niko Peleshi	PS	Minister of Agriculture and Rural Development in Rama's II Cabinet.
Korçë County	Valentina Duka	PD	
Kukës County	Flamur Noka	PD	Deputy Chair of the Committee on National Security
Kukës County	Isuf Çelaj	PD	
Kukës County	Mimi Kodheli	PS	Chair of the Committee on Foreign Policy
Lezhë County	Aldo Bumçi	PD	
Lezhë County	Andon Frrokaj	PD	
Lezhë County	Gjetan Gjetani	PS	
Lezhë County	Lindita Nikolla	PS	Minister of Education, Sports and Youth in Rama's II Cabinet.
Lezhë County	Lindita Metaliaj	PD	
Lezhë County	Pjerin Ndreu	PS	
Lezhë County	Viktor Tushaj	LSI	
Shkodër County	Agron Çela	LSI	
Shkodër County	Bardh Spahia	PD	
Shkodër County	Ditmir Bushati	PS	Minister for Europe and Foreign Affairs in Rama's II Cabinet.
Shkodër County	Izmira Ulqinaku	PD	
Shkodër County	Lorenc Luka	PD	
Shkodër County	Luan Harusha	PS	
Shkodër County	Nard Ndoka	PD	
Shkodër County	Paulin Sterkaj	PS	
Shkodër County	Romeo Gurakuqi	PD	
Shkodër County	Senida Mesi	PS	Deputy Prime Minister in Rama's II Cabinet.
Shkodër County	Tom Doshi	PSD	
Tiranë County	Albana Vokshi	PD	Chair of the Committee on Education and Public Information
Tiranë County	Arben Ahmetaj	PS	Minister of Finance and Economy in Rama's II Cabinet.
Tiranë County	Arben Pëllumbi	PS	
Tiranë County	Besnik Baraj	PS	
Tiranë County	Blerina Gjylameti	PS	
Tiranë County	Dashamir Shehi	PD	
Tiranë County	Elona Hoxha	PS	
Tiranë County	Endrit Brahimllari	LSI	
Tiranë County	Ervin Bushati	PS	
Tiranë County	Fatmir Mediu	PD	
Tiranë County	Fatmir Xhafaj	PS	Ministry of Internal Affairs in Rama's II Cabinet.
Tiranë County	Flojda Kërpaçi	LSI	
Tiranë County	Gent Strazimiri	PD	
Tiranë County	Grida Shqima	PD	
Tiranë County	Halim Kosova	PD	
Tiranë County	Jorida Tabaku	PD	Deputy Chair of the Committee on Economy and Finance
Tiranë County	Klajda Gjosha	LSI	Deputy Chair of the Committee on Foreign Policy
Tiranë County	Klotilda Bushka	PS	
Tiranë County	Luan Rama	LSI	
Tiranë County	Lulzim Basha	PD	
Tiranë County	Ogerta Manastirliu	PS	
Tiranë County	Olta Xhaçka	PS	
Tiranë County	Orjola Pampuri	PD	
Tiranë County	Pandeli Majko	PS	
Tiranë County	Rakip Suli	PS	
Tiranë County	Rudina Hajdari	PD	
Tiranë County	Sadi Vorpsi	PS	
Tiranë County	Sadri Abazi	PS	
Tiranë County	Sajmir Tahiri	PS	
Tiranë County	Sali Berisha	PD	
Tiranë County	Ulsi Manja	PS	
Tiranë County	Vasilika Hysi	PS	
Tiranë County	Xhemal Qefalia	PS	
Vlorë County	Vullnet Sinaj	PS	
Vlorë County	Agron Shehaj	PD	
Vlorë County	Alket Hyseni	PS	
Vlorë County	Andrea Marto	PS	
Vlorë County	Damian Gjiknuri	PS	
Vlorë County	Edi Rama	PS	
Vlorë County	Edmond Leka	PS	
Vlorë County	Fatmir Velaj	PS	
Vlorë County	Nadire Meçorapaj	PD	
Vlorë County	Sezai Rokaj	LSI	
Vlorë County	Vangjel Dule	PD	
Vlorë County	Vilma Bello	PS	

== See also ==
- Parliament of Albania
- 2017 Albanian parliamentary election
