= Erion Veliaj =

Albanian politician (born 1979)

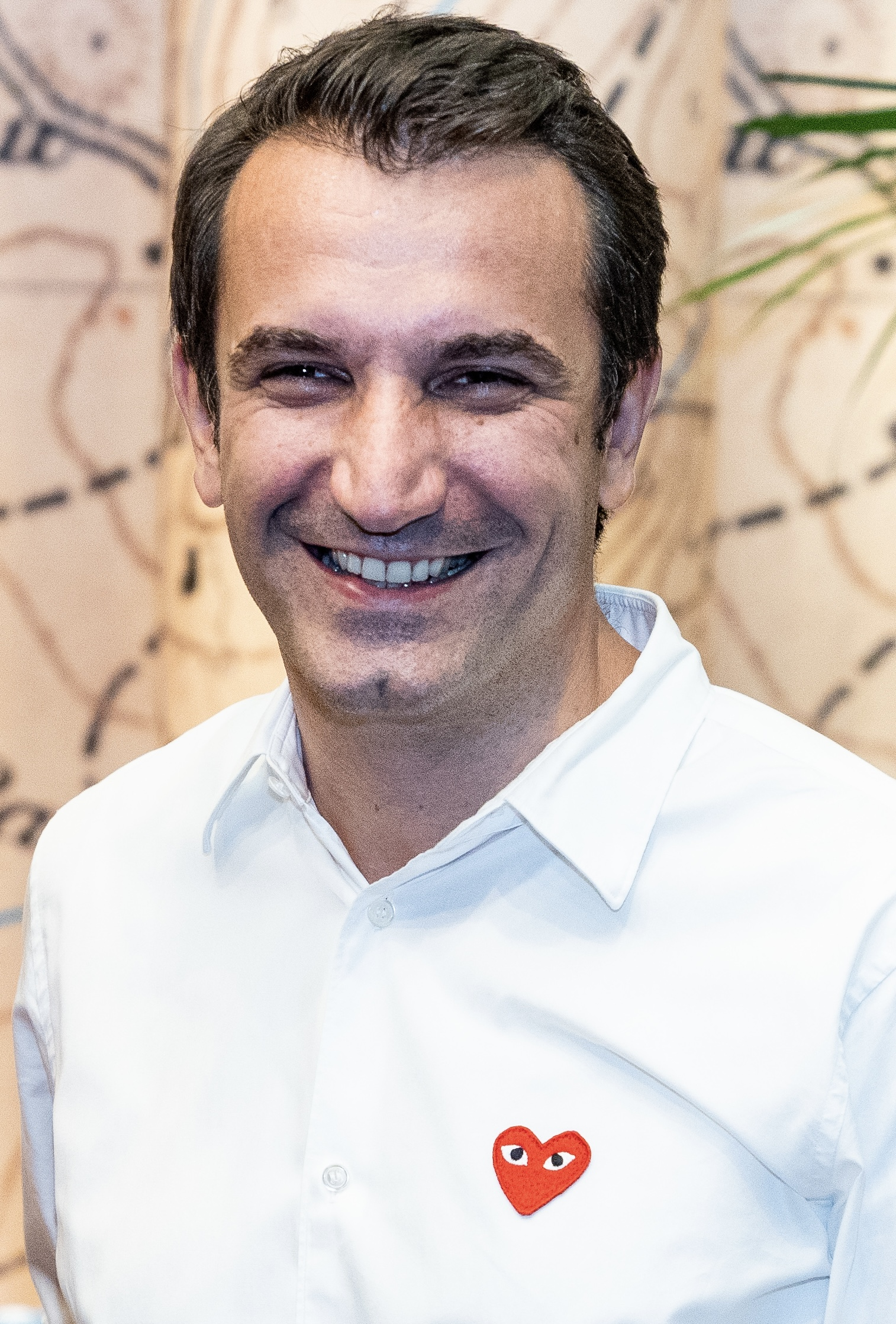
- Veliaj in 2018

42nd Mayor of Tirana
- Incumbent
- Assumed office 21 July 2015 (Note: Anuela Ristani served as acting mayor while Veliaj's mayoral powers and duties were suspended by the government from 10 February 2025 to 3 November 2025 due to his arrest, but the Constitutional Court later reinstated him as mayor.)
- Preceded by: Lulzim Basha

Minister of Social Welfare and Youth
- In office 15 September 2013 – 30 April 2015
- Prime Minister: Edi Rama
- Preceded by: Spiro Ksera
- Succeeded by: Blendi Klosi

Personal details
- Born: 17 December 1979 (age 46) Tirana, PSR Albania
- Party: G99 (2008–2010); Socialist Party (2010–3rd November 2025)
- Spouse: Ajola Xoxa (m. 2014)
- Children: 2
- Education: Grand Valley State University, University of Sussex

Erion Veliaj (born December 17, 1979) is an Albanian politician who is the mayor of Tirana, the capital and largest city of Albania. Beginning as an activist and the leader of MJAFT!, Veliaj joined the Socialist Party of Albania in 2011, where he was appointed Secretary for Youth and Immigration. He served as a member of parliament for Gjirokastër and as Minister of Social Welfare and Youth under Prime Minister Edi Rama. In April 2015, Veliaj was appointed as the mayoral candidate of the Socialist Party in Tirana. He won the 2015 Albanian local elections and took office as mayor of Tirana on July 31, 2015. He was re-elected in 2019 and 2023.

In May 2024, the Special Prosecution against Corruption and Organized Crime (SPAK) initiated an investigation into the assets of Veliaj and his family after corruption allegations regarding the Tirana incinerator project. On February 10, 2025, SPAK arrested Veliaj on charges related to corruption and money laundering, and placed him in pre-trial detention due to concerns about witness intimidation. Veliaj denied any wrongdoing. Veliaj's lawyers have challenged his pre-trial detention in the Constitutional Court and Supreme Court, which have upheld the detention.

== Personal life and education ==
Erion Veliaj was born on December 17, 1979, in Tirana, Albania. His father Luan Veliaj served as an officer in the Albanian Army, and his mother was a personnel manager in the military. He said he sold figs in his youth to support himself. He attended the Sami Frashëri High School in Tirana, then attended Grand Valley State University in Allendale, Michigan, where he graduated with a B.A. in political science. He received his master's degree in European Integration from the University of Sussex. Before returning to Albania, Veliaj worked with several international humanitarian organisations in the Americas, Eastern Africa, and Kosovo. Veliaj is from an atheist family. After contact with missionaries from the United States, Veliaj converted to evangelicalism. He is married and has 2 sons.

== Early political career ==
=== MJAFT! ===
Veliaj founded and led MJAFT!, a civic organization created in 2003 that protested social and political injustices in Albania. In 2004, MJAFT! was granted the United Nations Award for Civil Society for its efforts to "strengthen a sense of community, promote good governance, and improve the image of Albania worldwide." Veliaj was involved with MJAFT! until November 2007. The organization lost staff and influence after he departed to enter politics.

=== G99 ===
In 2008, Veliaj and other activists from MJAFT! created G99 (Group 99), a center-left political party. While initially unaligned, G99 joined other political parties of the center-left coalition in the 2009 Parliamentary Election. Veliaj ran as G99's leading candidate for the district of Tirana. G99 earned 0.86% of the vote in 2009, failing to win a seat in the Parliament.

=== Socialist Party of Albania ===
In 2011, Veliaj joined the Socialist Party of Albania. In the Socialist Party, Veliaj was nominated to serve as Secretary for Youth and Emigration. In 2013, he was nominated as a candidate for MP representing the district of Gjirokastër. The center-left coalition of political parties won the 2013 Parliamentary Election, and Veliaj was appointed to serve as Minister of Social Welfare and Youth in Edi Rama's new cabinet. He resigned in 2015 due to being nominated as the Socialist Party's candidate for Mayor of Tirana.

== Mayor of Tirana ==
=== First term (2015–2019) ===
In April 2015, Veliaj was the mayoral candidate of the Socialist Party in the city of Tirana. Veliaj was elected Mayor of Tirana in the June 2015 Albanian local elections with 53.58% of the vote. The candidate representing the oppositional Democratic Party was Halim Kosova, a well-known gynecologist, serving as a Member of Parliament at the time. Other candidates were Gjergj Bojaxhi, a former Democratic politician, and Sazan Guri, an environmental activist. Veliaj took office on 31 July 2015.

==== Urban initiatives ====
A case study by Innovations for Successful Societies said that after Veliaj was elected in 2015, his administration "worked with private donors and international experts to quickly construct parks, playgrounds, nurseries, schools, and pedestrian spaces" to improve city life. Tirana has chronic air pollution and heavy traffic, and the role of the car is controversial. In 2015, Tirana organized two car-free days. Public art projects included an exhibit of Reja (the cloud), from Sou Fujimoto, in 2016.

In January 2017, a renovated Skanderbeg Square was inaugurated by Veliaj and the Prime Minister. That project won the 2018 European Prize for Urban Public Space. In an urban renewal project, the Pazari i Ri ("New Bazaar") neighbourhood was rebuilt. In 2021 Veliaj said that Tirana opened 14 new schools in one year, more than any previous year in the city. In July 2017, the Municipality of Tirana voted to raise the water tariff significantly; Veliaj promoted this action by arguing that it would eventually make drinking water available 24 hours a day, and help improve access and quality. The municipality had a plastic bag reduction initiative in 2017.

==== Controversial comments ====
A 17-year-old boy died on 7 August 2016 working in very poor conditions in the landfill of Sharrë, which became controversial because the company that managed the landfill of Sharrë, "3R", was promoted by Veliaj as having good working conditions. The prosecutor attested that Tirana "signed a contract that transferred all the liability to the company 3R, therefore… no evidence implicating the municipality has come up." Two journalists who investigated the situation were fired, possibly due to pressure from the mayor or prime minister.

On 27 November 2018, in a televised speech to the City Council, Veliaj reacted to the developing story about a police officer who lost her fingers in clashes with protesters in Tirana, by saying "We are all men here. Would any of us have eyes to marry someone with no fingers?" In response to criticism, Veliaj said that he was only referring to prejudice that the officer would face in the future. In April 2019, Veliaj said that half of the construction permits issued in Tirana 2018 were for public works, and a reporter found no evidence to support this. Veliaj also said in April 2019 that he worked with dozens of volunteers to plant 25,000 trees in one day in Tirana, which tree experts said was not a realistic number. In 2022, he said he had planted one million trees in Tirana, but the World Bank said in 2024 that tree cover had decreased in Tirana.

=== Second term (2019–2023) ===
Veliaj was elected to a second term as mayor in the June 2019 Albanian local elections.

==== Construction of new National Theatre (2020) ====
The National Theatre is a remnant of state commissions from the 1930s and 1940s, developed under successive authorities: the Albanian monarchy, the Italian fascist occupation, and later the communist regime. In the late 2010s, the Albanian government sought to renovate the theatre. In 2018, following a design competition, the Albanian government awarded the contract for a new theatre to BIG (Bjarke Ingels Group), which pledged to deliver a modernized venue aligned with Tirana's and Albania's contemporary cultural needs.

Amidst the protests against the construction of a new National Theatre building in place of Tirana's old National Theatre, in May 2020, the Albanian government transferred ownership of the land of the National Theatre to the Tirana Municipality through a special law. This law emphasized that the land must be used only for the construction of a new theatre building. The old theatre was demolished on May 17, 2020, by bulldozers with heavy police presence. This decision drew condemnation from several local activists, opposition political parties, and artists against the Municipality of Tirana and the Albanian government. Europa Nostra called the demolition of the theatre as illegal and against the rule of law. The Delegation of EU in Albania voiced their concern regarding the lack of dialogue between the authorities and activists before the demolition took place.

=== Third term (2023–present) ===
Veliaj won a third term as mayor in the 2023 Albanian local elections.

==== Incinerators ====
Several key people in the municipality were implicated in a scandal surrounding the misappropriation of funds dedicated towards the garbage incineration plants of the city. Veliaj and the Municipal Council were criticized for allowing continued public payments related to the incinerators after SPAK started investigating corruption. Veliaj and his family denied involvement in any impropriety with respect to the incinerators.

In 2026, Veliaj won a defamation lawsuit against Italian citizen Gabriele Tarroni Longinotti, with the Tirana General Jurisdiction Court. The case was filed over Langinotti's specific claim that Veliaj had been involved in the purchase of a failed incinerator, a piece of equipment that an Italian company had acquired from Romania as scrap. During the proceedings, Longinotti admitted he had no direct contact with Veliaj and that he had made some of his public statements with the expectation of financial gain.

==== 5D construction company ====
In 2024, five high-ranking directors in the Municipality were found to have conspired in creating a firm named 5D, to which several public tenders were granted. Other companies were not properly considered during the tender processes, as is required by law. The scandal angered the opposition, which organized protests in front of the Mayor's offices, calling for his arrest. Veliaj denied any involvement.

==== Pre-trial detention ====
During Veliaj's pre-trial detention in 2025, four deputy mayors took over much of the mayor's duties. On 23 September 2025, Veliaj was discharged by the Tirana Municipal Council, a decision overturned by the Constitutional Court of Albania ruling that the dismissal was unconstitutional, reinstating him as mayor and halting plans for special elections.

== Investigation, arrest, and pre-trial detention ==
=== Investigation into wealth ===
In April 2024, Veliaj spent eight hours at the Special Structure against Corruption and Organized Crime (SPAK) office providing clarifications regarding the Tirana incinerator and 5D construction company controversies. Following a second round of questioning in May 2024, SPAK opened an inquiry into the assets of Veliaj and his family and requested information from second-level banks in Albania regarding financial transactions, banking activities, and loans connected to Veliaj and his relatives. Eventually, SPAK abandoned its cases against most of the other family members, aside for his wife, who was charged with "passive corruption." Veliaj's relatives denied all wrongdoing by the mayor or his family. Veliaj's wife accused SPAK of seeking to manipulate public opinion through distortions.

=== Arrest and pre-trial detention ===
On 10 February 2025, SPAK ordered Erion Veliaj's arrest on nine charges of corruption and money laundering. The charges included laundering money from developers via a process that involved non-profit organizations, including organizations controlled by family members. According to Balkan Insight, "Prosecutors allege he improperly received some 1.1 million euros in connection with nine public contracts or building permits issued under his signing." Since his arrest, has been held in pre-trial detention in the Durrës Detention Center awaiting trial. SPAK determined that he should be held in pre-trial detention due to attempts to tamper with evidence and intimidate witnesses and prosecutors. Veliaj was formally indicted in July 2025. On 11 February 2025, Veliaj designated Deputy Mayor Anuela Ristani to serve as Acting Mayor. While still in pre-trial detention in August 2026, Veliaj dismissed Ristani and requested "practical conditions" to enable serving as mayor from jail.

==== Defense ====
Veliaj hired the American law firm Kasowitz Benson Torres and British law firm Mishcon de Reya. Veliaj's lawyers have objected to the length of the pre-trial detention, arguing that by late 2025 Veliaj had been detained for many months without a full hearing while most of his co-defendants were released. Politicians from both sides of Albania's political spectrum have criticized SPAK's handling of Veliaj's case. SPAK has significant support from the general public in Albania. In May 2025, British political strategist Alastair Campbell wrote that Veliaj's pre-trial detention raised concerns about due process and the rule of law in Albania in the context of the country's bid for European Union membership.

Also in 2025, Veliaj published a letter from Istanbul Mayor Ekrem İmamoğlu, who welcomed the Albanian Constitutional Court's decision restoring Veliaj's mandate and expressed support while noting his own imprisonment in Turkey. Prime Minister Edi Rama has called for Veliaj's release. In January 2026, Prime Minister Edi Rama criticized SPAK, accusing it of relying on anonymous denunciations while failing to resolve long-standing, high-profile cases such as the January 21, 2011 killings of four protesters. In January 2026, 76 mayors from the B40 Balkan Cities Network published a letter calling to "end the indefinite detention of Mayor Ekrem İmamoğlu [mayor of Istanbul] and Mayor Erion Veliaj."

Veliaj has PR consultants working for him and his lawyers. Balkan Insight described Veliaj's media campaign related to his case as an effort to pressure the judiciary. His law firm has lobbied on his behalf to American politicians, including making allegations against the prosecutor for his case. The media campaign has involved articles that critique Veliaj's detention as unfair, published on websites such as EU Reporter and Independent Policy Digest. Some posts were translated and republished in Albanian media, described by VNA as a form of "information laundering".

==== Charges and court challenges ====
SPAK completed their investigation in September 2025 and sent the case to trial. The 13 charges filed against Veliaj included passive corruption, money laundering, failure to declare assets, abuse of office, and bringing items into prison; the charges against his wife include passive corruption, money laundering, failure to declare assets, and concealment of income. On 3 November 2025 Albania's Constitutional Court ruled that Veliaj could remain in office while on trial, overturning the municipal council's attempt to dismiss him. In January 2026, nearly a year into his pre-trial detention, Veliaj requested that his pre-trial detention be replaced with less restrictive measures.

On 25 May 2026, the Albanian Constitutional Court ordered the country's Supreme Court to reassess Veliaj's detention ruling, seeking reasoning regarding its proportionality. On 28 May 2026 the Supreme Court rejected Veliaj's request to replace the "pre-trial detention" with a lighter security measure such as bail or obligatory reporting, upholding the decision of the Special Court of Appeal. The Constitutional Court held in July 2026 that the Supreme Court had not individually analyzed all defense claims or demonstrated that all aspects of his pre-trial detention were proportionate when weighed against lighter security measures (such property guarantees) and the impact on Veliaj's mandate as elected mayor. The Supreme Court scheduled a hearing for 15 September 2026 to review his security measures. On 15 September, the Supreme Court ruled in favor of allowing authorities to continue to detain him. On October 6 Veliaj, while still in detention, released an AI-generated video of himself pledging to make sure that the schools in the capital would offer free lunches to children.

== Awards and honors ==
- Doctor Honoris Causa, Grand Valley State University (2017)
- Excellence in Public Service award from the Abraham Lincoln Foundation in Albania (2017)
- 21Heroes2021 from the Transformative Urban Mobility Initiative (TUMI) (2021)
- Special mention in the Innovation Business & Leader Awards from the National Association of Young Innovators (ANGI) (2024)

== Notes and references ==
=== References ===
Political offices
Preceded by Spiro Ksera	Minister of Social Welfare and Youth; 2011–2013	Succeeded by Blendi Klosi
Preceded by Lulzim Basha	Mayor of Tirana; 2015 –	Succeeded by incumbent
