= 2019 Albanian opposition protests =

2019 opposition-led protests in Albania

The 2019 Albanian protests were demonstrations and protests led by the opposition, between February and June 2019, calling for the cancellation of the 2019 Albanian local elections, fresh elections, the resignation of prime minister Edi Rama and his entire cabinet and the installation of a new technocratic government.

== Background ==
Albania has been plagued by civil unrest since the 2011 Albanian opposition demonstrations and the 2017 Albanian opposition protest. Major protests erupted after allegations that prime minister Edi Rama had engaged in vote-rigging and corruption. Allegations of organised crime in the government triggered almost daily protest actions. After the leaks, thousands took to the streets and waved the Albanian flag and posters denouncing Rama.

== Protests ==
Despite heavy police presence and brutality during previous uprisings, the protesters came in their hundreds of thousands, demonstrating and calling for the resignation of the government in Tirana. Protesters attacked the prime minister's residence and were met with tear gas. Opposition protesters clashed with riot police during the next couple of days of anti-government street rallies. Rioting played a major role during the movement, violence had flared during weekly marches. Marches, rallies, picketing, rioting and protest movement, demonstrations, general strike actions and unrest would have turned into a conflict, but it managed to prevent that. Violent protests and opposition rallies erupted in March.

Countrywide protests turned violent as police quelled stone-throwing protesters who attempted to strip parliament and demanded democratic reforms and better conditions, calling and chanting for the resignation of the government of Edi Rama and new elections, led by opposition leader Lulzim Basha between March 21-March 28. However, episodes of nonviolent rallies occurred in Tirana, where thousands then tens of thousands of protesters participated in nonviolent protests, with police presence scarce. Looting, labour strikes and peaceful protest became an unprecedented national protest movement and protests become increasingly popular.

Widespread protests and popular demonstrations however turned violent again as protesters used stones, banners, projectiles, gates, labour protests urged the government to resign in Shkodra and Vandalism was on the rise. Symbols and human chains was linked as a way of nonviolence, however, it is broken up by Water cannon. In Late-May and June, violent protests occurred during political chaos and rallies, marches turned into increasingly violent protests characterised by crackdown and violence. Police and the army fired Tear gas, Rubber bullets and Water cannon at every protest calling for the resignation of the government. Crowds with Phonelights and candles marched in downtown streets in Tirana for the first week of July, the last week of protest actions in 2019.

Disputed protests and protesters called for the resignation of the government was increasing, while the opposition chanted ouster slogans. In July, popular protests ended with violence and clashes. Street battles occurred when protesters threw Petrol bombs and hurled broken bricks at police, who responded with Tear gas, Water cannon, Stun grenade, Rubber bullets and Flash grenade. Demonstrators threw bottles and flared slogans during the scuffles. One of the demonstrator's main demands was fresh elections and the cancellation of the 2019 Albanian local elections, the elections was scheduled for June 30 but was annulled and cancelled.

== See also ==
- 2019-2020 Albanian political crisis
