= Justice and Unity Party =

Justice and Unity Party may refer to:

- Party for Justice and Unity, Albania
- Indonesian Justice and Unity Party

== See also ==
- Justice Unity Party, Thailand
