= Sfida për Shqipërinë =

Political party in Albania

Challenge for Albania SFIDA për Shqipërinë
- Leader: Hektor Ruci
- Founded: 2016
- Headquarters: Tirana
- Ideology: Populism; Direct democracy
- Political position: Centre to centre-right
- European affiliation: None
- International affiliation: None
- Colours: Orange
- National Assembly: 0 / 140
- Municipality: 0 / 61

Website
- sfidapershqiperine.com sfida.org.al

SFIDA! për Shqipërinë (CHALLENGE! for Albania or simply SFIDA!) is an Albanian political party, founded in 2016. SFIDA is an anti-establishment party that promotes direct democracy, mandate limitation and vetting for politicians. SFIDA is a follow-up of the movement "Ne, Tirana" which supported Gjergj Bojaxhi during local elections in 2015, where he ran as an independent candidate for Tirana's city hall. The party does not have a traditional leader. Instead, this role is split between an administrative chairman (held by Hektor Ruci) and a political representative, Gjergj Bojaxhi.

== History ==
In June 2015, Bojaxhi ran as an independent candidate in the local elections for the city hall of Tirana. This candidacy was supported by an organized civil movement called "Ne, Tirana". Erion Veliaj won the elections; however, Bojaxhi won over 16,000 votes. Based on this significant public support, in 2016 Bojaxhi and several other founders created "SFIDA! për Shqipërinë" in order to extend "Ne, Tirana" to a national scale. SFIDA participated for the first time in the national general elections in June 2017.

== Ideology ==
Sfida për Shqipërinë is a centrist party.

== Parliamentary representation ==
National Assembly
Election	Leader	Votes		Seats		Role
Election	Leader	#	%	#	±	Role
2017	Hektor Ruci	3,523	0.2	0 / 140	new	extra-parliamentary

== Links ==
- sfidapershqiperine.com
- sfida.org.al
- Facebook page
