= 2019 Albanian local elections =

2019 Albanian Local Elections
- 30 June 2019
- Turnout: 22.97% (▼24.86 pp)

Map of Albania's Municipalities

Local elections were held in Albania held on 30 June 2019. Voters were asked to elect mayors, municipal council members, municipal unit mayors and municipal unit members. These were the second local elections in Albania since substantial administrative reforms legislated in 2014 reduced the number of municipalities in the country to 61.

The Central Election Commission of Albania was responsible for administrating the elections.

== Background ==
Following months of political crisis, opposition parties promised to not participate in the election, accusing the government and the Prime Minister of vote buying, voter intimidation and links with criminal organizations which had contributed to the Socialist Party's majority in previous elections.

The President originally attempted to postpone the elections, instead opting to hold them on October 13 after many protests were held by opposition parties, some of which turned violent. The postponement was, however, not accepted by the government and the CEC, which decided to continue with the process on the original date.

The Socialists ran uncontested in 31 municipalities, facing smaller parties and independent candidates in the other 30 municipalities, including the newly formed Bindja Demokratike, resulting in an absolute win by the Socialists in all municipalities except Finiq, and the Socialists gaining the most votes in all city council elections except Finiq and Pukë.

In most areas, turnout was low, ranging between under 10% in Shkodra to around 38% in Librazhd. Only one municipality, Pustec, was outside of this range, and had a turnout of over 50%.

== Parties and coalitions ==
Following the decision of the Albanian opposition to not run in the elections, the incumbent Socialist Party and their alliance faced very little competition in most municipalities, only having to counter small parties and independents.

The Democratic Party opted to not partake in the elections, following several months of protests.

Number	Party	Acronym	Chairman	Coalition
1	Fryma e Re Demokratike	FRD	Bamir Topi	–
2	Partia Demokracia e Re Europiane	PDRE	Koci Tahiri	Shpresa për Ndryshim
3	Partia Balli Kombëtar Shqiptar	PBK	Adriatik Alimadhi	Shpresa për Ndryshim
4	Partia Bashkimi Liberal Demokrat	BLD	Arian Starova	Shpresa për Ndryshim
5	Aleanca Kuq e Zi	AK	Lumturi Ratkoceri	Shpresa për Ndryshim
6	Partia Ora e Shqiperise	POSH	Zef Shtjefni	Shpresa për Ndryshim
7	Partia Emigracionit Shqiptar	PESH	Kostaq Papa	Shpresa për Ndryshim
8	Partia Komuniste e Shqipërisë	PKSH	Qemal Cicollari	–
9	Partia Personat me Aftesi te Kufizuar	PPAK	Gjovalin Shqalshi	–
10	Aleanca për Barazi dhe Drejtësi Europiane	ABDE	Valentino Mustaka	Aleanca për Shqipërinë Europiane
11	Partia Aleanca Arbnore Kombetare	AAK	Gjet Ndoj	Aleanca për Shqipërinë Europiane
12	Partia Demokracia Sociale e Shqipërisë	PDS	Paskal Milo	Aleanca për Shqipërinë Europiane
13	Partia Kristian Demokrate e Shqipërisë	PKD	Dhimiter Muslia	Aleanca për Shqipërinë Europiane
14	Partia Lëvizja Punëtore Shqiptare	PLPSH	Genc Sakaj	Aleanca për Shqipërinë Europiane
15	Partia e Pajtimit Kombëtar Shqiptar	PPK	Spartak Dobi	Aleanca për Shqipërinë Europiane
16	Partia e Gjelbër e Shqipërisë	PGJ	Edlir Petanaj	Aleanca për Shqipërinë Europiane
17	Partia G99	G99	Redi Shtino	Aleanca për Shqipërinë Europiane
18	Partia e Reformave Demokratike Shqiptare	PRDSH	Krenar Rryçi	Aleanca për Shqipërinë Europiane
19	Partia Aleanca Demokristiane	ADK	Zef Bushati	Aleanca për Shqipërinë Europiane
20	Partia Socialpunëtore Shqiptare	PSP	Ramadan Ndreka	Aleanca për Shqipërinë Europiane
21	Partia Aleanca për Demokraci dhe Solidaritet	ADS	Gaqo Apostoli	Aleanca për Shqipërinë Europiane
22	Partia për Mbrojtjen e të Drejtave të Emigrantëve e Shqipërisë	PMDE	Ymer Kurti	Aleanca për Shqipërinë Europiane
23	Partia Demokrate Per Integrim e Prosperitet	PDIP	Kujtim Muca	Aleanca për Shqipërinë Europiane
24	Partia Aleanca Demokratike	AD	Eduart Abazi	Aleanca për Shqipërinë Europiane
25	Partia Socialiste e Moderuar	PSM	Gjergj Koja	Aleanca për Shqipërinë Europiane
26	Partia Ardhmëria Shqiptare	PASH	Emin Subashi	Aleanca për Shqipërinë Europiane
27	Partia e Unitetit Kombëtar Shqipëtar	PUK	Idajet Beqiri	Aleanca për Shqipërinë Europiane
28	Partia Socialdemokrate e Shqipërisë	PSD	Engjell Bejtaj	Aleanca për Shqipërinë Europiane
29	Partia e të Drejtave të Mohuara	PDM	Ilir Vata	Aleanca për Shqipërinë Europiane
30	Partia Socialiste e Shqipërisë	PS	Edi Rama	Aleanca për Shqipërinë Europiane
31	Partia Aleanca Maqedonase për Integrimin Europian	AMIE	Edmond Themelko	–
32	Partia për Mbrojtjen e të Drejtave të Punëtorëve	PMDPSH	Kadri Isufaj	–
33	Partia Kombetare Konservatore	PKKA	Kujtim Gjuzi	–
34	Partia per Liri Demokraci dhe Etike	LDE	Arian Galdini	–
35	Raporti i auditimit për Partia Minoriteti Etnik Grek për të Ardhmen	MEGA	Kristo Kiço	–
36	Partia Bindja Demokratike	BD	Astrit Patozi	–

== Results ==
Five days after the election, on July 4, 2019, only preliminary results were available. The final results were not published until the end of July.

Shkodër and Finiq remained led by the opposition, despite boycotts. Other municipalities returned a majority for the Socialist Party. According to official figures, turnout was 22.97%, equivalent to 812,249 people. The opposition stated that, according to their calculations, only 534,528 people took part, which means that the turnout was 15.12%. The elections were declared as a farce by leader of the opposition Lulzim Basha at the time.

Shkodër was handed back to Voltana Ademi following a trial against the official winner who was suspected to have been involved in trafficking.

County	Municipality	Council Seats	Vote Share PS (Socialist Party)	ASHE Seats (Socialist Party)	Other parties and independent candidates	Winner
Berat	Berat	31	90.79 %	30 (29)	1	Socialist Party
Berat	Kuçova	31	82.28 %	31 (26)	0	Socialist Party
Berat	Poliçan	15	87.07 %	15 (13)	0	Socialist Party
Berat	Skrapar	15	85.32 %	14 (13)	1	Socialist Party
Berat	Ura Vajgurore	21	74.34 %	21 (15)	0	Socialist Party
Dibër	Bulqizë	21	33.55 %	20 (7)	1	Socialist Party
Dibër	Dibër	31	45.72 %	29 (14)	2	Socialist Party
Dibër	Klos	21	28.26 %	21 (6)	0	Socialist Party
Dibër	Mat	21	51.69 %	21 (11)	0	Socialist Party
Durrës	Durrës	51	87.13 %	50 (46)	1	Socialist Party
Durrës	Krujë	31	69.37 %	31 (23)	0	Socialist Party
Durrës	Shijak	21	73.76 %	20 (+6)	1	Socialist Party
Elbasan	Belsh	21	80.14 %	20 (18)	1	Socialist Party
Elbasan	Cërrik	21	88.13 %	21 (19)	0	Socialist Party
Elbasan	Elbasan	51	80.43 %	49 (43)	2	Socialist Party
Elbasan	Gramsh	21	47.74 %	21 (10)	0	Socialist Party
Elbasan	Librazhd	21	54.21 %	18 (12)	3	Socialist Party
Elbasan	Peqin	21	84.85 %	21 (18)	0	Socialist Party
Elbasan	Përrenjas	21	64.45 %	21 (13)	0	Socialist Party
Fier	Divjakë	31	81.95 %	31 (26)	0	Socialist Party
Fier	Fier	51	91.19 %	51 (48)	0	Socialist Party
Fier	Lushnjë	41	83.08 %	40 (33)	1	Socialist Party
Fier	Mallakastër	21	64.74 %	21 (15)	0	Socialist Party
Fier	Patos	21	89.82 %	21 (19)	0	Socialist Party
Fier	Roskovec	21	92.06 %	21 (19)	0	Socialist Party
Gjirokastër	Dropull	21	76.99 %	18 (16)	3	Socialist Party
Gjirokastër	Gjirokastër	31	63.09 %	30 (19)	1	Socialist Party
Gjirokastër	Këlcyra	15	22.78 %	13 (4)	2	Socialist Party
Gjirokastër	Libohovë	15	73.63 %	14 (12)	1	Socialist Party
Gjirokastër	Memaliaj	21	77.76 %	21 (17)	0	Socialist Party
Gjirokastër	Përmet	15	44.17 %	15 (7)	0	Socialist Party
Gjirokastër	Tepelena	15	80.21 %	15 (12)	0	Socialist Party
Korçë	Devoll	21	68.54 %	21 (15)	0	Socialist Party
Korçë	Kolonja	15	60.74 %	15 (10)	0	Socialist Party
Korçë	Korça	41	76.94 %	39 (33)	2	Socialist Party
Korçë	Maliq	31	82.34 %	31 (26)	0	Socialist Party
Korçë	Pogradec	31	62.06 %	30 (20)	1	Socialist Party
Korçë	Pustec	15	43.04 %	11 (6)	4	Socialist Party
Kukës	Has	21	22.4 %	20 (5)	1	Socialist Party
Kukës	Kukës	31	24.17 %	27 (8)	4	Socialist Party
Kukës	Tropojë	21	31.31 %	21 (7)	0	Socialist Party
Lezhë	Kurbin	31	54.28 %	28 (11)	3	Socialist Party
Lezhë	Lezhë	41	35.27 %	30 (15)	1	Socialist Party
Lezhë	Mirditë	21	24.77 %	21 (5)	0	Socialist Party
Shkodër	Fushë-Arrëz	15	32.27 %	13 (5)	2	Socialist Party
Shkodër	Malësia e Madhe	31	34.56 %	26 (11)	5	Socialist Party
Shkodër	Pukë	15	27.66 %	15 (4)	0	Socialist Party
Shkodër	Shkodër	51	75.83 %	51 (40)	0	Socialist Party
Shkodër	Vau i Dejës	31	43.99 %	31 (14)	0	Socialist Party
Tirana	Kamëz	41	87.61 %	40 (36)	1	Socialist Party
Tirana	Kavajë	31	94.36 %	31 (29)	0	Socialist Party
Tirana	Rrogozhinë	21	93.94 %	21 (20)	0	Socialist Party
Tirana	Tirana	61	85.82 %	59 (56)	2	Socialist Party
Tirana	Vorë	21	82.43 %	20 (18)	1	Socialist Party
Vlorë	Delvinë	15	100.0 %	15 (15)	0	Socialist Party
Vlorë	Finiq	21	34.49 %	12 (8)	9	MEGA
Vlorë	Himarë	21	63.82 %	20 (14)	1	Socialist Party
Vlorë	Konispol	15	100.0 %	15 (15)	0	Socialist Party
Vlorë	Sarandë	31	68.09 %	27 (23)	4	Socialist Party
Vlorë	Selenicë	21	66.41 %	21 (15)	0	Socialist Party
Vlorë	Vlorë	51	86.65 %	49 (47)	2	Socialist Party

== By-elections of March 2022 ==
After the results of the 2019 elections, by-elections were announced on March 6, 2022, as at the time there was no elected mayor in Vorë, Dibër, Shkodër, Lushnjë, Rrogozhine and Durrës. Several candidates that had been elected in June 2019 had not taken office either due to their death, or they had been arrested on corruption charges.

Between the 2019 elections and the March 2022 by-elections, Sali Berisha had been expelled from the PD by the party's leadership. However, he had previously personally conducted a party congress in which participants had deposed the party leadership of Lulzim Basha.

In the partial elections of the aforementioned six municipalities, a candidate from the Democratic Party and a Berisha candidate ran alongside a candidate from the Socialist Party. The Berisha loyalist candidates ran under the coalition name Shtëpia e Lirisë ("House of Freedom"). In all communities, House of Freedom candidates received significantly more votes than the official PD representatives. Berisha's candidate managed to win in Shkodër, while the rest of the municipalities were won by the Socialist Party.

In the three voting stations of Bruçaj, Ndrejaj and Palaj, small villages in the northern mountains of Albania, elections were not held due to bad weather from heavy snowfall causing power cuts.

Results from the partial election
Municipality	Turnout	Winner	Political party	PS	PD	SHeL
Vorë	41.04%	Blerim Shera	Socialist Party	69.39%	6.29%	24.33%
Dibër	41.99%	Rahim Spahiu	Socialist Party	60.82%	19.28%	19.46%
Lushnjë	35.88%	Eriselda Sefa	Socialist Party	58.80%	10.43%	30.77%
Shkodër	28.05%	Bardh Spahia	House of Freedom	39.51%	16.82%	43.67%
Durrës	26.57%	Emiriano Sako	Socialist Party	58.47%	11.85%	29.68%
Rrogozhinë	28.45%	Edison Memolla	Socialist Party	60.73%	21.96%	17.31%
