= Party for Justice and Integration =

Party for Justice and Integration Partia për Drejtësi dhe Integrim
- Leader: Tahir Muhedini
- Founded: May 2004
- Dissolved: February 17, 2011
- Merged into: Party for Justice, Integration and Unity
- Headquarters: Tirana, Albania
- Ideology: Cham issue
- Political position: Centre-right
- Colours: Blue; Green
- Kuvendi (2009): 1 / 140

Website
- pdi-al.com

Party for Justice and Integration (Albanian: Partia për Drejtësi dhe Integrim, or PDI) was a political party in Albania that represented the Cham Albanians in politics. In February 2011, it dissolved into the Party for Justice, Integration and Unity.

== Formation ==
The party was formed in 2005 and declares in its statute that it belongs to the center right, which is the political homeland for the vast majority of Chams marginalized by the Communist regime. Since the demise of the one-party state, the Chams have consistently put their faith in the center right parties to pursue their rights with Greece. However, the Chams are fully aware that Tirana’s politicians, whether Democrats or Socialists, only really focus on the Cham question during election time.

== Elections ==
The party won the plurality of seats in the municipality of Saranda, Delvina, Konispol, Markat, Xarrë and was one of the main parties in big municipalities like Vlora, Fier, etc., on the last municipal elections in 2007. At the 2009 national elections, the party received around 14.477 (0,95%) votes and one seat on the Albanian parliament.

== Dissolution ==
On 17 February 2011 it merged with the Party for Justice and Unity to form the Party for Justice, Integration and Unity.

== See also ==
- Cham Albanians
- Cham issue
- Chameria
- Politics of Albania
