= Braho =

Braho is a surname. Notable people with the surname include:

- Sefedin Braho (1953–2024), Albanian footballer
- Spartak Braho (born 1951), Albanian politician
