= Mimoza Hafizi =

Albanian physicist and politician

Member of the Albanian parliament
- In office 2013–2017

Personal details
- Born: 20 February 1962 (age 64) Shkodër, Albania
- Party: Socialist Party (2009–2016); LIBRA (2016–current)
- Education: University of Tirana; École Normale Supérieure

Mimoza Hafizi (born 1962) is an Albanian politician and physicist who is a former member of the Assembly of the Republic of Albania for the LIBRA Party. She has been representing the Socialist Party from 2013 until 2016. In October 2016, together with Ben Blushi, she created LIBRA. She failed to win a second mandate on the 2017 election.

She was born on 20 February 1962 in Shkodër. She graduated from the University of Tirana in Physics and is a well known astrophysicist in the country. She later continued her doctoral studies in France, in the École Normale Supérieure in Paris. She is a prominent figure, a well known academic and an MP since 2013 for the Shkodër County.

== Education ==
- Doctorate in Theoretical Physics from the Paris 7 University, France (1995)
- Masters of Theoretical Physics from the Paris 7 University, France (1991)
- Graduate of Advanced Physics from the University of Tirana, Faculty of Natural Sciences (1875)
- Associated professor of Physics (2000)
