= Besnik, Rožaje =

Besnik Бесник
- Village
- Location within Montenegro
- Country: Montenegro
- Municipality: Rožaje

Population (2011)
  - Total: 349
- Time zone: UTC+1 (CET)
  - Summer (DST): UTC+2 (CEST)

Besnik (Serbian Cyrillic: Бесник) is a village in the municipality of Rožaje, Montenegro.

== Name ==
The name of the village comes from the Albanian masculine name Besnik.

== Demographics ==
According to the 2011 census, its population was 349, all but three of them Bosniaks.
