= Dashamir =

Dashamir is an Albanian masculine given name. Notable people with the name include:

- Dashamir Shehi (born 1957), Albanian politician
- Dashamir Tahiri (born 1966), Albanian politician
- Dashamir Xhika (born 1989), Albanian footballer
