= Party for Justice and Unity =

Party for Justice and Unity Partia për Drejtësi dhe Unitet
- Abbreviation: PDU
- Leader: Shpëtim Idrizi
- Founded: September 2009
- Dissolved: February 17, 2011
- Split from: Party for Justice and Integration; Socialist Party of Albania
- Merged into: Party for Justice, Integration and Unity
- Headquarters: Tirana, Albania
- Ideology: Cham issue
- Political position: Centre-right
- Colours: Red; Blue
- Kuvendi (2009): 2 / 140

Website
- pdu-al.com

The Party for Justice and Unity (Albanian: Partia për Drejtësi dhe Unitet, or PDU) was a political party in Albania whose primary aim is promotion of the Cham issue.

The party was created after the 2009 parliamentary elections, in September by two deputies of the Albanian parliament: the sole representative of Party for Justice and Integration, Dashamir Tahiri and Shpëtim Idrizi, a Cham MP of the Socialist Party.

On 17 February 2011 it merged with the Party for Justice and Integration to form the Party for Justice, Integration and Unity.
