= Shoqata Çamëria =

Albanian think tank

Shoqëria Politike Atdhetare Çamëria
- Founded: January 22, 1991
- Type: NGO
- Location: Tirana, Albania
- Origins: Cham people

Shoqata Çameria is a national political organisation supporting the rights of the Cham people and advocacy of the Cham issue. It is one of the main NGOs in Albania. It was created on 22 January 1991, which makes it one of the first NGOs registered since the pluralism.
