= Hysni Milloshi =

Albanian politician (1946–2012)

General Secretary of the Communist Party of Albania
- In office 14 December 1991 – 25 April 2012
- Preceded by: Position established
- Succeeded by: Qemal Cicollari

Personal details
- Born: 26 January 1946 Macukull, People's Republic of Albania (now Albania)
- Died: 25 April 2012 (aged 66) Tirana, Albania
- Party: Party of Labour (until 1991); Communist Party (1991–2012)

Hysni Milloshi (26 January 1946 – 25 April 2012) was the founder and General Secretary of the Communist Party of Albania, successor to the Party of Labor of Albania.

== Biography ==
Milloshi was born in Macukull, Mat District, Albania, on January 26, 1946. During communist rule, Milloshi, who was a member of the Party of Labour, was a writer and a somewhat obscure figure. He established the "Enver Hoxha" Voluntary Activists' Union, an organization loyal to the principles and policies of Enver Hoxha, at Berat on 22 February 1991, apparently with the backing of some leading hard-liners in the Party of Labour. The organization waged a prominent and vocal struggle to prevent the unraveling of communist rule. Milloshi was also a modest author and poet.
He died in Tirana's "Senatorium" hospital, on April 25, 2012, after struggling with pulmonary fibrosis.

== Elections ==
Milloshi participated more than once in the local elections, running for Mayor of Tirana Municipality. He was considered a key factor in 2011 Pyrrhic victory of Lulzim Basha over former Mayor Edi Rama in Albanian Local Elections 2011, gaining around 1400 votes.
