= Besnik =

Besnik is an Albanian masculine given name, which means loyal or faithful. People named Besnik include:

- Besnik Bekteshi (born 1941), Albanian politician
- Besnik Bisha (born 1958), Albanian film director and actor
- Besnik Bislimi (born 1971), Kosovo Albanian economist, academic and politician
- Besnik Dushaj (born 19??), Albanian politician
- Besnik Ferati (born 2000), Macedonian footballer
- Besnik Hasi (born 1971), Kosovar-Albanian footballer and manager
- Besnik Krasniqi (born 1990), Kosovar-Albanian footballer
- Besnik Musaj (born 1973), Albanian cyclist
- Besnik Mustafaj (born 1958), Albanian writer and diplomat
- Besnik Podvorica (born 1986), Kosovar-Albanian basketball player
- Besnik Prenga (born 1969), Albanian footballer
