= Democratic Conviction =

Political party in Albania

Democratic Conviction Partia Bindja Demokratike
- Abbreviation: BD
- Leader: Astrit Patozi
- Founded: 23 April 2019; 7 years ago
- Split from: Democratic Party
- Merged into: LZHK
- Headquarters: Rruga Pjetër Bogdani, ndërtesa 13, hyrja 6/1,Tirana
- Ideology: Conservatism; Liberal conservatism
- Political position: Centre-right
- Colours: Blue
- National Assembly: 0 / 140
- Municipality: 0 / 61

Website
- Official website

The Democratic Conviction (Note: News sources have reported on the party under various English names: Democratic Conviction Party or Democratic Obedience Party. However, on its own website, it has referred to itself in English as Democratic Conviction.) (Albanian: Partia Bindja Demokratike, BD) was a political party in Albania that was registered on April 23, 2019, belongs to the center-right political spectrum. Its coordinator is Astrit Patozi.

== History ==
Democratic Conviction was created during the 2019 Albanian protests. It participated in the 2021 Albanian parliamentary election, winning 0.5% of the vote and no seats. They merged with LZHK on 31 January 2025.

== See also ==
- List of political parties in Albania
