= Libra Party =

Equal List Lista e Barabartë
- Abbreviation: LIBRA
- Leader: Endri Tafani
- Founders: Ben Blushi; Mimoza Hafizi
- Founded: 1 November 2016; 9 years ago
- Split from: Socialist Party
- Headquarters: Rr. "Brigada 8-të" Pallati 2, Tirana
- Ideology: Social liberalism Civic nationalism Pro-Europeanism
- Political position: Centre to centre-left
- Colours: Yellow
- National Assembly: 0 / 140
- Municipality: 0 / 61

Website
- libra.al

The Libra Party or Equal List (Albanian: Lista e Barabartë) is a political party in Albania. It was founded in 2016.

== History ==
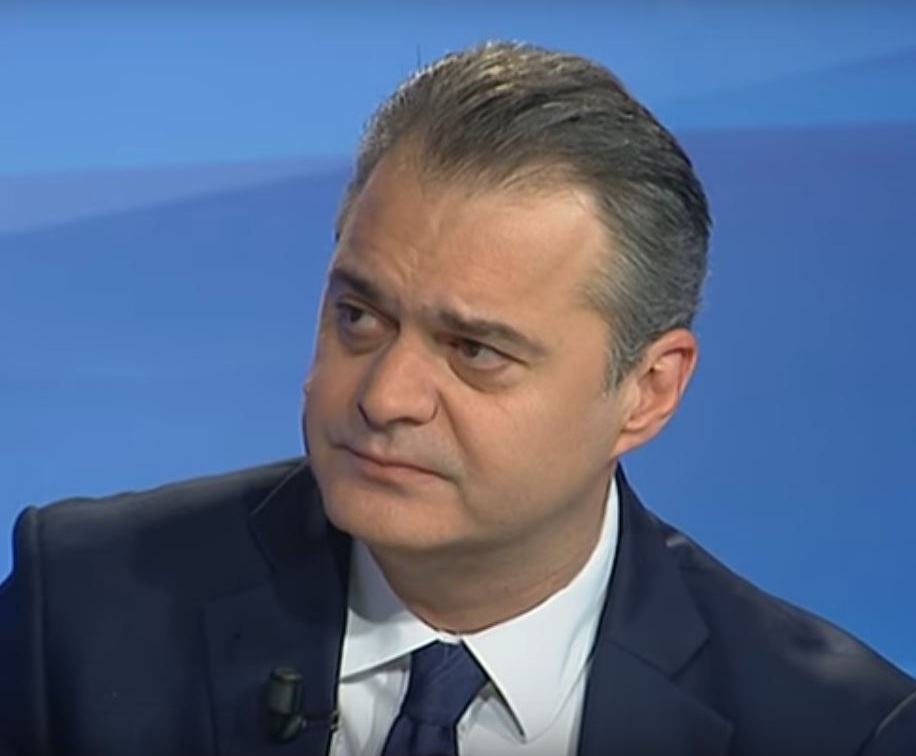
Ben Blushi

The party was founded by Ben Blushi, a prominent politician/writer, and Mimoza Hafizi; both former MPs of the Socialist Party of Albania. They left the Socialist Party after months of discussions with the leader Edi Rama and opposed the government's decisions. The pair wanted elections to be held within the party to elect a new leader. In October 2016, after leaving the party they created LIBRA, which in Albanian is an acronym for 'Lista e Barabartë' (The equal list).

Currently both Ben Blushi and Mimoza Hafizi serve as Members of the National Assembly from the LIBRA Party.

== Ideology ==
Libra means Knowledge, Freedom and Balance. It is a centre-left political party with centrist tendencies, which promotes equality and human rights. Social liberalism, civic nationalism and pro-Europeanism are its 3 main ideologies. It promotes democracy and education and believes that all people should be treated as equal. The main goal is to help reduce poverty and to create a society that lives in harmony and justice.

== Leader ==
No.	Name	Took office	Left office
1	Ben Blushi	1 November 2016	20 January 2018
2	Endri Tafani	20 January 2018	present

== Parliamentary representation ==
National Assembly
Election	Leader	Votes		Seats		Role
Election	Leader	#	%	#	±	Role
2017	Ben Blushi	19,666	1.3	0 / 140	new	extraparliamentary
