= EU Reporter =

European Union news website

- Available in: English
- Founded: 2002
- Headquarters: Brussels, {{{location_country}}}
- Owners: EU Reporter Media & Communications Ltd, Dublin, Ireland
- Founder: Chris White
- Editor: Colin Stevens
- Website: eureporter.co
- OCLC number: 1232992027

EU Reporter is a Brussels-based news website publishing content related to the European Union, founded in 2002. It has been run by Colin Stevens since 2010. The website includes both news and sponsored content, and other news organizations have criticized some of its articles and practices, including accusations of undisclosed lobbying.

== History ==
In the 2000s a printed magazine edition was available for subscription, and distributed free to Members of the European Parliament (MEPs), and European Council and Commission officials. In 2009 its target readership was elected representatives, large and small business leaders, and commentators about the EU.

In 2010 it was taken over by Colin Stevens. It had previously been owned by publisher Chris White, who continued writing for EU Reporter as a guest contributor. Stevens has worked as a journalist and television executive, and in public relations and political lobbying. Former ITV Wales executive Nick Powell was Political Editor for EU Reporter from 2021 to 2024.

== Reputation ==
In 2021 Politico Europe described EU Reporter as a "blend of corporate press releases, original news and paid-for content", and said that some of the website's sponsored content is native advertising intended to look like a news article, without disclosing the sponsor. It said that EU Reporter was a "Belt and Road Initiative of China Media partner" and posted "extensive positive coverage" of Kazakhstan and Azerbaijan. According to Politico Europe, EU Reporter paraphrased Huawei press releases and published them as news articles. A group of fake Twitter accounts posted links to the EU Reporter articles in an apparent attempt to influence a legislative process in Belgium; Stevens said he did not know anything about the accounts. EU Reporter rejected Politico Europe's accusation of undercover lobbying, characterising the reporting as "an attack by Politico Europe on a smaller but successful rival publication," and said that they have engaged with NewsGuard to monitor their output and make its findings publicly available.

In 2023 Malta Today reported that EU Reporter had reprinted allegations of government corruption with questionable origins; EU Reporter took down the article for fact-checking after the subject denied the allegations. In 2024 Byline Times reported that EU Reporter published a video of a staged protest in Moldova in a way that spread disinformation. EU Reporter took down the article after Byline Times inquired about it, and Stevens said that it would examine their criteria for articles contributed by third parties. In 2026, in response to criticism from CNA, an Albanian news website, about an EU Reporter article about politician Erion Veliaj, Stevens said that EU Reporter "publishes articles from a variety of external sources expressing a wide range of views".
