= Përlindja e Shqipërisë =

- Owner: Part of Party for Justice, Integration and Unity
- Publisher: PDIU
- Founded: 27 March 2011
- Political alignment: Centre-right
- Language: Albanian
- Headquarters: Tirana, Albania
- Website: pdiu.al

Përlindja e Shqipërisë is a free newspaper published in Albania. Përlindja e Shqipërisë is a politically affiliated daily newspaper and is part of Party for Justice, Integration and Unity.

== Content ==
=== Sections ===
The newspaper is organized in three sections, including the magazine.

1. News: Includes International, National, Tirana, Politics, Business, Technology, Science, Health, Sports, Education.
2. Opinion: Includes Editorials, Op-Eds and Letters to the Editor.
3. Features: Includes Arts, Movies, Theater, and Sport.

=== Web presence ===
Përlindja e Shqipërisë has had a web presence since 2011. Accessing articles requires none registration.
