= G99 =

G99 (Group 99) G99 (Grupimi 99)
- Leader: Redi Shtino
- Founded: 2008
- Headquarters: Tirana
- Ideology: Secularism; Reformism; Progressivism; Youth rights Anti-corruption; Anti-conservatism
- Political position: Centre-left
- Colours: Red, Black

G99 (in Albanian Grupimi 99) is a centre-left and progressive political party in Albania created in 2008 by a group of activists who have previously participated in the Movement Mjaft!. Members of this party are under 29 years old and consider themselves as representatives of the youth in Albanian politics.

== History ==
The party was founded in the summer of 2008, by activists from Mjaft Movement! and student, unhappy because the political game and the kink in the system of governance in Albania was not any longer tolerable The Mjaft! Movement was the largest non-governmental organizations in Albania, which protest against the Albanian government and politics since 2003. Only in 2008 this group, with the participation of other students, decided that the only solution to their demands was political participation. With their first demonstration made known their plan to participate in elections in 2009, with the intention to get some seats in the Assembly and to be represented in the government. In 2009 they joined the "Union for Change" (Bashkimi per Ndryshim in Albanian) a coalition of the Left which aims to take power in upcoming elections.

== Last elections ==
In the 2009 parliamentary elections. G-99 received 0.86% of the votes (12,989 votes).

== Ideology ==
G99 highlighted some issues which were forgotten or not reported for years. The party declared that it has no political ideology such as conservatism or socialism, but only wants to change the actual situation. For this it was appropriate to join the Left. Some shocking facts from the statistics on education, physical and psychological violence, the economic situation in Albania, one of the European worsened, especially after the global economic crisis. Among the numerous commination were youth participation in politics.

It's not simple to define the ideology of this party: it is clear that it is part of the center-left and it is against all conservative ideas. This is demonstrated by their continuous criticism of the government in power, bringing evidence against politicians. This youth movement proposes different political ideas, which, according to their proclamation, must change radically. G99, since participation is only for the young, has played that card by engaging youth through various activities, like rock music and meetings open to all. The reason for choosing this young party so quickly when G99 just came on the political scene is that, for the first time, it stated that policy should be driven by a large turnout of young boys and girls, because they make up 50% of the population in Albania.

Finally, the G99 movement can be classified as a party with the ideology of progressive liberalism.

As regards the economy, they support a free capitalist economy, but they declare that the government should intervene to prevent the formation of social classes. This allows them to be considered a party with a social-liberal ideology. However, they do not make any statements defending this position, only describing the party as a youth movement for change.

== See also ==
- Politics of Albania
- Elections in Albania
- Social democracy
- MJAFT
