= 2019–2021 Albanian political crisis =

Protests against the government in Albania

- Date: 16 February 2019 – 25 April 2021 (2 years, 2 months, 1 week and 2 days)
- Location: Albania
- Caused by: Suspected vote buying in the 2017 Albanian parliamentary election; Corruption; Organized crime in the government
- Goals: Removal of Edi Rama as Prime Minister; New elections
- Methods: Protests; Civil disobedience; Barricades; Blocking traffic; Rioting; Insurgency; Vandalism
- Result: Socialist Party wins 2019 and 2021 elections; Democratic Party fractures after Berisha is expelled by party leader Basha following Berisha's non-grata status declaration by the US

Parties
Democratic Party of Albania; Socialist Movement for Integration; Party for Justice, Integration and Unity; Republican Party of Albania	Government of Albania; Socialist Party of Albania

Lead figures
Lulzim Basha	Edi Rama

Starting from 16 February 2019, the opposition parties organized a series of protests and rallies against the government to demand new elections and the formation of a technocrat government that would ensure the fairness of the electoral process, citing electoral fraud and corruption in the government as the main reasons for the need for change.

The opposition coalition consists of the Democratic Party of Albania, the Socialist Movement for Integration, the Party for Justice, Integration and Unity, the Republican Party and other minor opposition parties. After the first protests opposition MPs decided to resign in mass from parliament.

== Background ==
Following a 6-month boycott period, the opposition parties returned to parliament in January and announced mass protests to be held against the Rama Government. Meanwhile, the government was reshuffled as an aftermath of the student protests.

In a similar rhetoric as in 2017 the opposition coalition accused the government of corruption and electoral fraud. The first nationwide protest was announced on 16 February 2019 in Tirana. Prior to that, the State Police issued a warning about the presence of criminal elements in the protest which was condemned as a form of intimidation by the opposition coalition.

== Protests and mass resignation ==
On 16 February 2019, opposition supporters from different cities gathered in Tirana demanding new elections and the resignation of the Rama Government. The protest turned violent as there were clashes with the police and use of tear gas and water cannon against the protesters. Some of them tried to enter the Prime Minister's Office as they broke through police ranks. Thousands of opposition supporters attended the protest that was considered as being one the biggest protests that the country had seen in years.

In the aftermath, the opposition parties announced that all their MPs in the parliament would resign from the parliament in an unprecedented act. On 22 February 2019 another protest was announced outside the parliament's building, while other MPs were attending the plenary session. The peaceful demonstration culminated in a march led by opposition leader Lulzim Basha and members of the opposition parties in the parliament, to hand over signed statements giving up their parliamentary seats and demanding fresh elections. More than 40 seats were vacated and the Central Elections Commission started in the following days the procedures to replace the MPs with mostly unknown and inexperienced figures that were part of the candidate lists during the 2017 election.

Some MPs from opposition parties refused to resign their mandate, among them the daughter of one of the founders of the Democratic Party, Rudina Hajdari.

On 16 March 2019, another big demonstration was announced. It started outside the Prime Minister's Office building and continued outside the parliament, where once again protesters clashed with police and water cannons and tear gas were used to controlling the situation.

Another big protest was called on 18 April 2019, this time in the afternoon. In the days prior to the protest, the two main opposition parties have refused to enlist in the local elections of 30 June, signaling a boycott.

== Boycotting local elections ==
The opposition parties decided to boycott the local elections previously set to be held on 30 June.

=== Wiretap scandal ===
Wiretaps part of an investigation still on process by the prosecution office in Albania, were released by Bild on June, where government and socialist party officials were taped dealing with vote buying and forcing people to vote for the Socialist Party in the elections of Dibra. Among the officials in the tapes was also the Prime Minister Edi Rama, former minister of Energy Damian Gjiknuri and former minister of interior Saimir Tahiri.

== Reactions ==
After the protest of 16 February turned violent, the US Embassy in Tirana issued a press statement condemning the violence and destruction. Other foreign embassies issued similar statements condemning the violence and calling for political dialogue to solve the situation.

The mission of OSCE in Albania called the instigators and the perpetrators to "bear the responsibility for the incidents".

Following the mass resignation of the opposition MPs, the European Union condemned the extreme action through a joint statement issued by the EU Diplomatic Chief Federica Mogherini and Enlargement Commissioner Johannes Hahn, considering the acts as counterproductive and against the democratic choice of Albanian citizens, undermining progress in the path to accessing the European Union and hindering the functioning of democracy in Albania.

== Protests in 2020 ==
A protest movement erupted in May after the demolition of the national theatre at the center of Tirana. Police dispersed the demonstrators with tear gas and pepper spray. Another movement erupted in December after a shooting of a man. Tear gas was fired to disperse protesters while protests dwindled.
