= Eglantina Gjermeni =

Albanian politician (born 1968)

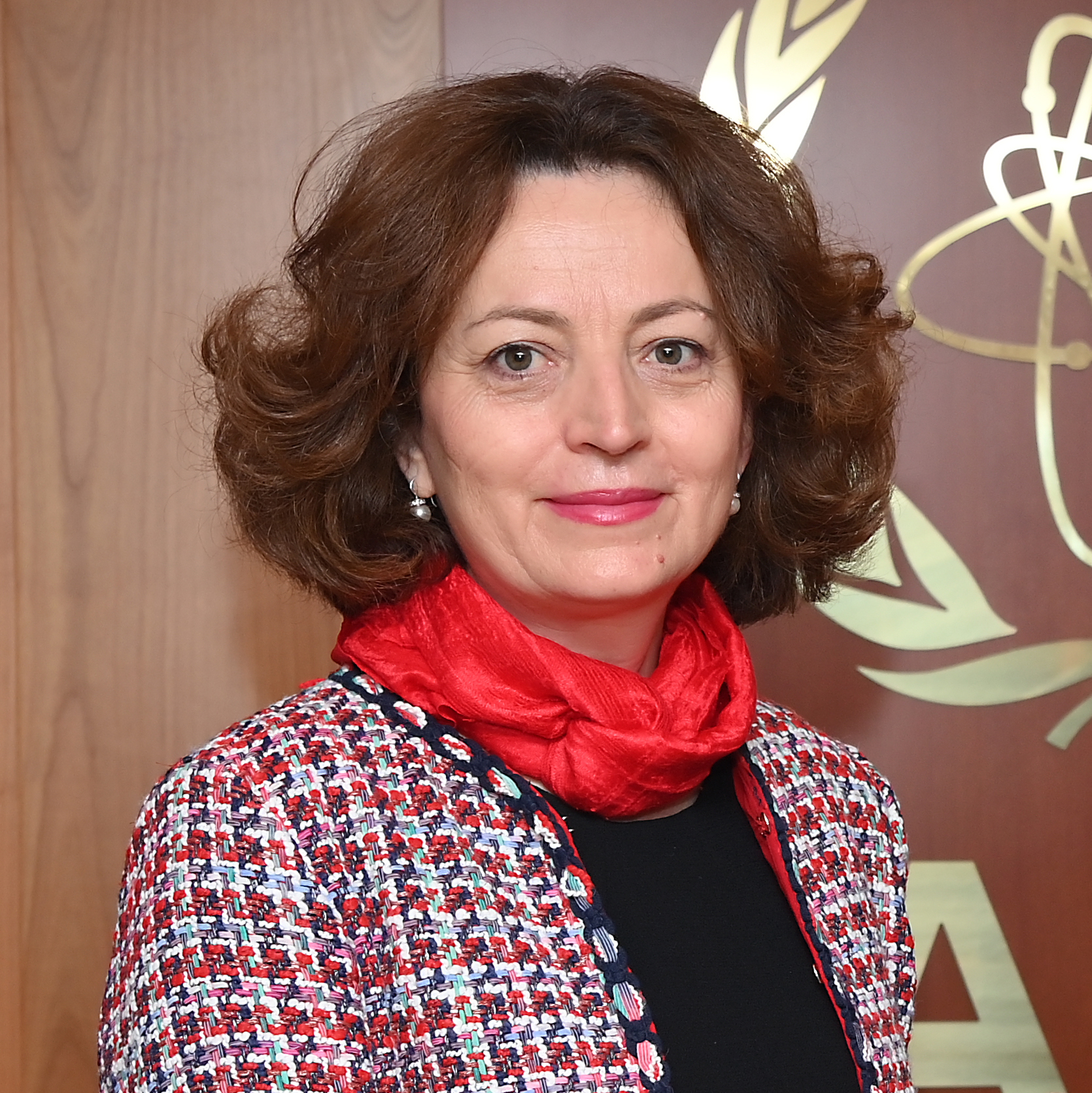
- Born: November 24, 1968 (age 57); Krujë, Albania
- Education: University of Tirana and Grand Valley State University
- Occupations: politician and diplomat
- Known for: Government minister and ambassador
- Political party: Socialist Party of Albania
- Spouse: Marian Gjermeni

Eglantina Gjermeni (born November 24, 1968) is an Albanian politician and diplomat. She is an expert in gender equality and she was a government minister for four years. In 2022, she was appointed Permanent Representative of Albania to the International Organizations in Vienna.

== Life ==
Gjermeni was born in Krujë in 1968 and she initially studied history. She earned a doctorate in social work at the University of Tirana in 1994 after she had gained her masters Grand Valley State University in Michigan, United States. In the following year she began lecturing at the University of Tirana in the Department of Social Affairs. For a decade she led the Gender Alliance for Development Center in Albania.

She was elected to the Albanian Parliament in 2009 and again in 2013. In September 2013 she became Albania's Minister of Urban Development which was a position she held for four years. During this time she gave up full time lecturing.

She is an expert in gender equality and has attended courses abroad. Her paper "Implementation of Gender Quota in Albania" was published in 2014.

In 2017 she was given a "Distinguished Alumni Award" by the ex-students of Grand Valley State University and she began to chair the Albanian Parliament's Subcommittee on Gender Equality and Prevention of Violence against Women.

In 2022 Gjermeni became an Ambassador based in Austria where she became Albania's Permanent Representative to the Organization for Security and Co-operation in Europe, the United Nations (UN) and other International Organizations based in Vienna.

== Private life ==
She is married to Marian Gjermeni and they have two children, Erik and Maggie.
