= Ardian Turku =

Albanian politician

Member of the Albanian parliament
- Incumbent
- Assumed office 2009

Personal details
- Political party: Democratic Party

Ardian Turku is a member of the Assembly of the Republic of Albania for the Democratic Party of Albania. He formerly served as mayor of Elbasan between 2003 and 2004.
