= Alfred Peza =

Albanian politician

General Director of RTSH
- In office June 2023 – September 6, 2024
- Preceded by: Thoma Gëllçi
- Succeeded by: Aurora Polo (acting)

Member of the Albanian Parliament
- In office 2013–2017
- Constituency: Peqin (assuming)

Personal details
- Born: February 27, 1967 (age 59) Peqin, PR Albania
- Party: Socialist
- Profession: Journalist; Politician; Author

Alfred Peza (born February 27, 1967) is an Albanian journalist and politician who has served as the General Director of the Albanian public broadcaster (RTSH) from June 2023 to September 2024, resigning after allegations of sexual harassment against him surfaced in the media.

He was elected unanimously by the Supervisory Council of RTSH for a five-year mandate. Peza, known for his extensive experience in journalism, editing, media analysis, lecturing, and leadership in various media outlets, had ambitious plans to elevate standards at RTSH, aiming to make it 'great once again in this digital era'.

Prior to his role at RTSH, Peza served as a member of parliament for the ruling Socialist Party between 2013 and 2017, being the deputy chair of the Albanian Assembly's Media and Education Committee from 2013 to 2017. Throughout his distinguished media career, he has been the recipient of numerous awards and honors and has authored numerous articles and several novels.
