= Tirana Book Fair =

Book Fair organised in Tirana

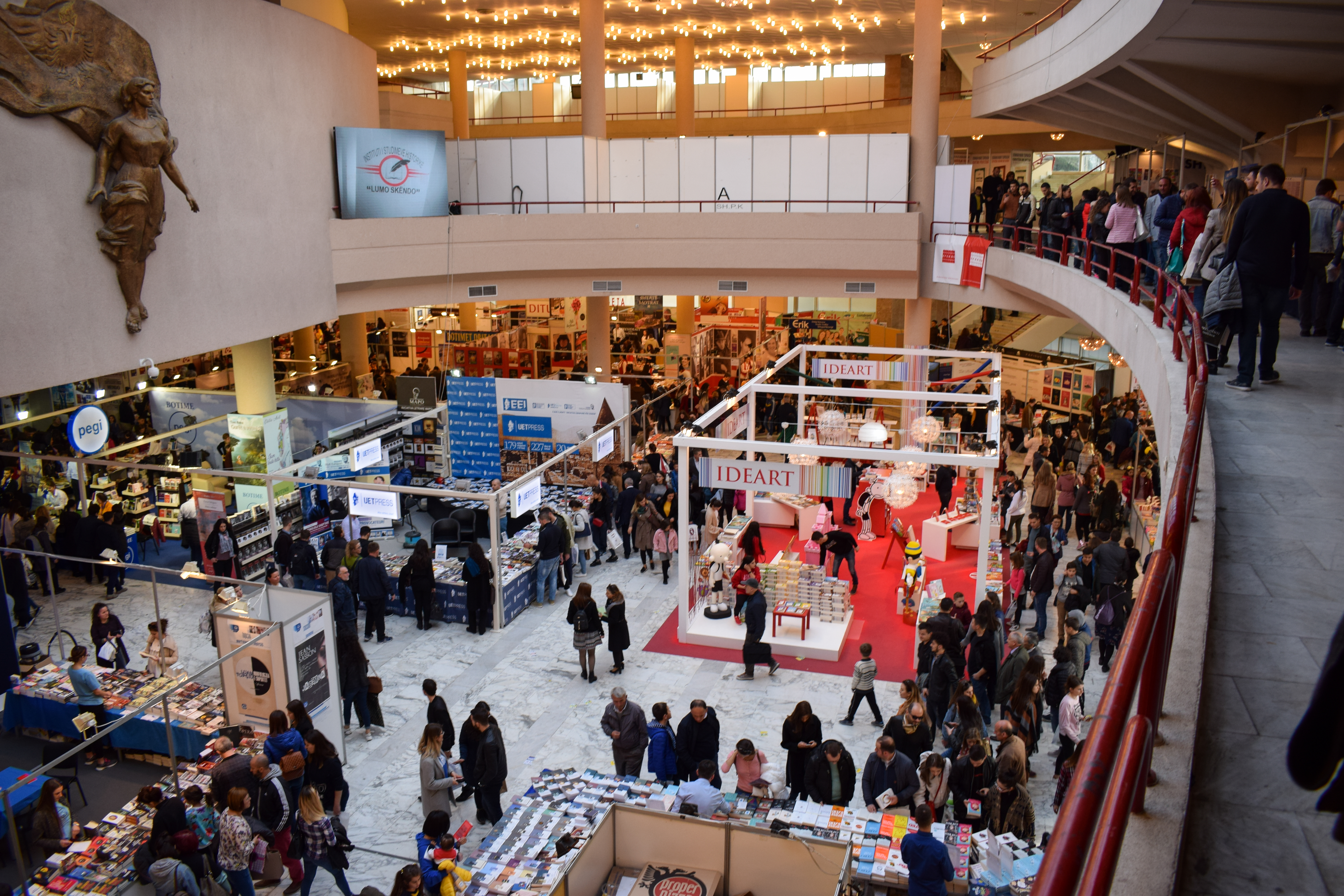
Tirana Book Fair (2018)

The Tirana Book Fair has been held annually in Tirana, Albania, in November since 1997.

Nearly 100 exhibitors, including publishing houses from Albania and neighboring countries like Kosovo, North Macedonia, and Montenegro present their recent publications, including contemporary Albanian fiction and poetry, historical accounts and translations of international bestsellers, as well as special sections dedicated to children's literature.

== See also ==
- Culture of Tirana
- Prishtina Book Fair
