= Ben Blushi =

Albanian politician, writer and journalist

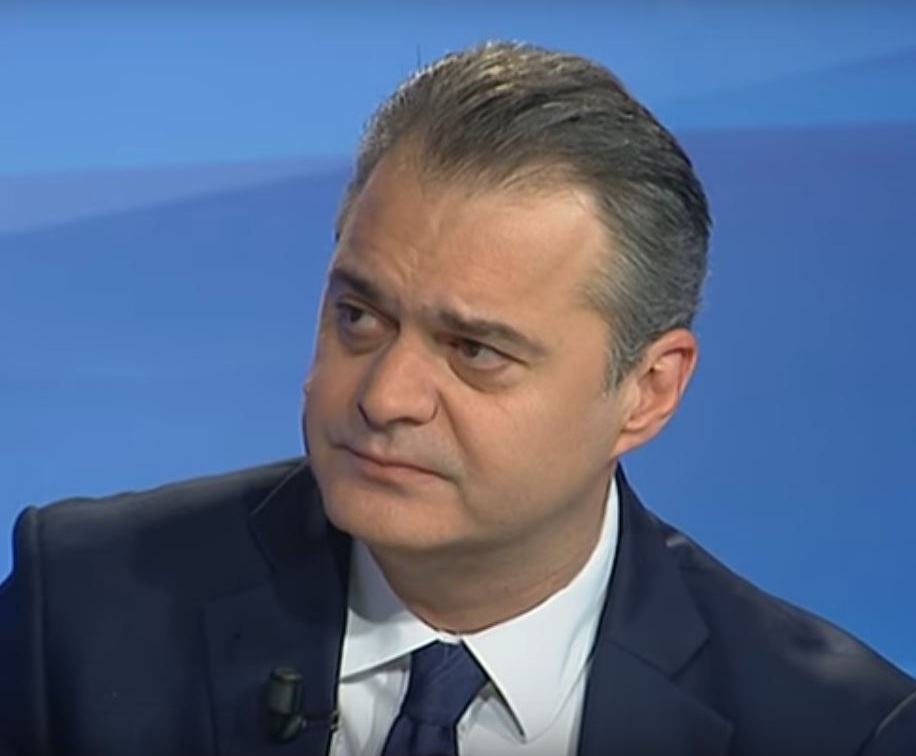

Leader of LIBRA
- In office 1 November 2016 – 20 January 2018
- Preceded by: Office established
- Succeeded by: Endri Tafani

Minister of Local Government and Decentralization
- In office 29 December 2003 – 1 September 2005
- Prime Minister: Fatos Nano
- Preceded by: Et’hem Ruka
- Succeeded by: post abolished

Member of the Albanian Parliament
- In office 6 September 2001 – 13 September 2017
- President: Bamir Topi; Bujar Nishani; Ilir Meta
- Prime Minister: Ilir Meta; Pandeli Majko; Fatos Nano; Sali Berisha; Edi Rama
- Parliamentary group: Socialist Party (until 2016); LIBRA (2016–2017)

Minister of Education and Science
- In office 6 September 2001 – 29 January 2002
- Preceded by: Et’hem Ruka
- Succeeded by: Luan Memushi

Personal details
- Born: 1 January 1969 (age 57) Tirana, Albania
- Party: Socialist Party (1998–2016); LIBRA (2016–2018)
- Education: University of Tirana

Ben Blushi (born 1 January 1969) is an Albanian politician, writer and journalist.

== Biography ==
Ben Blushi, born in Tirana, studied at the University of Tirana, graduating in Albanian language and literature. He was editor-in-chief of the newspaper Koha Jonë. His works deal with Albanian history and contemporary Albania. In April 2008, Ben Blushi published his first novel Të jetosh në ishull (Living on an Island). Within a couple of months, the book had sold over 30,000 copies, a record for the Albanian market. The novel covers Albanian history under the Ottoman Empire (15th–18th centuries), with a broad and not uncontroversial treatment of the country's Islamization. His second novel, Othello, The Moor of Vlora won the European Union Prize for Literature in 2014. His following novels The Candidate and The Prime Minister were the best selling books at the Tirana Book Fair in 2015 and 2016 respectively. Blushi is an atheist.

== Political career ==
In 1999 Blushi embarked upon a political career in the cabinet of Prime Minister Fatos Nano. For several months he served as Deputy Minister of Foreign Affairs, and in late 2000 he became Prefect of Korça. He served as Minister of Education and Minister of Local Governance and Decentralization.

Blushi was a Member of Parliament for the Socialist Party before creating a new party, LIBRA, in October 2016. Subsequently, he was an MP for LIBRA but he failed to win his seat in the 2017 election. In January 2018 he quit the party and politics and became the general director of Top Channel, with a wage that surpasses many of his European colleagues.

== Novels ==
- Të Jetosh Në Ishull. Toena, Tirana 2008
- Otello, Arapi i Vlorës. Toena, Tirana 2009
- Shqipëria. Mapo Editions, Tirana 2011.
- Kandidati. UET, Tirana 2015
- KM: Kryeministri. Mapo Editions, Tirana 2016
- Komploti. PEGI, Tirana 2023
- Parajsa Artificiale. PEGI, Tirana 2024

== Essays ==
- Hëna e Shqipërisë. UET, Tirana 2014.
- Letër një Socialisti, Tirana 2016.

== Awards and honours ==
- European Union Prize for Literature, Albania, Otello, Arapi i Vlorës (Othello, the Moor of Vlora)
