= Innovations for Successful Societies =

Research program at Princeton University

- Abbreviation: ISS
- Formation: 2008
- Location: Princeton, NJ
- Parent organization: Princeton University
- Affiliations: Woodrow Wilson School of Public and International Affairs; Mamdouha S. Bobst Center for Peace and Justice
- Website: Official Site
- Formerly called: Institutions for Fragile States

Innovations for Successful Societies (ISS) is a research program at Princeton University. ISS investigates government efforts to overcome strategic problems and development traps in emerging democracies. ISS is a joint program of Princeton's Woodrow Wilson School and Mamdouha S. Bobst Center for Peace and Justice.

== History ==
The Bobst Center and Woodrow Wilson School first created the program to support educational policy workshops and symposia on fragile states in 2006-7. The program took its current form and the name "Innovations for Successful Societies" in January 2008.

== Research ==
ISS publishes case studies and oral histories about public sector reforms. To date, ISS has published more than 100 case studies of reform efforts and conducted more than 2,000 in-country interviews with local government officials, journalists, activists, and experts. About one fifth of these interviews are recorded, transcribed and published as part of the group's Oral History Project. ISS case studies have been featured by Chris Blattman, Slate, Foreign Policy's "Democracy Lab," and the Tony Blair African Governance Initiative, among others.

The program's research focuses on efforts in civil service, accountable policing, elections, city management, corruption control, centers of government, and decentralization.
