= Gjergj Bojaxhi =

Albanian politician

Deputy Minister of the Economy, Trade and Energy
- In office 2005–2007

Personal details
- Born: 28 March 1974 (age 52) Tirana, Albania
- Party: PD (2005-2011); Sfida për Shqipërinë (2016-current)
- Education: St. John's College; Johns Hopkins University

Gjergj Bojaxhi is an Albanian politician and leader Sfida për Shqipërinë.

== Political career ==
=== Sfida për Shqipërinë ===
In 2016, Bojaxhi founded a party called Sfida për Shqipërinë. Bojaxhi was deputy minister of Economy, Trade and Energy from 2005 to 2007.
