= Edi Paloka =

Albanian politician

Edi Paloka MP

Member of the Albanian Parliament for Durrës
- In office 9 September 2017 – 18 February 2019

Deputy Chairman of the Parliament
- In office 9 September 2017 – 18 February 2019
- Prime Minister: Edi Rama
- Preceded by: Tritan Shehu
- Succeeded by: Myslim Murrizi

Personal details
- Born: 23 December 1965 (age 60) Tirana, Albania
- Party: Democratic
- Spouse: Desara Paloka
- Children: 2
- Education: University of Tirana
- Occupation: Politician

Edi Paloka (born 23 December 1965) is an Albanian Democratic Party politician and former Member of Parliament (MP) for Durrës. He was first elected MP in the 2001 general election and then for three other legislatures successively as a member of the parliamentary group of the Democratic Party.
