= MJAFT! =

Albanian non-government organisation

Mjaft!
- Formation: March 15, 2003; 23 years ago
- Type: NGO
- Purpose: to denounce political scandals and social injustice
- Headquarters: Tirana, Albania
- Leader: Erion Veliaj

MJAFT! (Albanian: Enough!) is a non governmental organisation in Albania that aims to raise awareness of the many political and socioeconomic problems facing Albania. MJAFT! grew out of a grassroots effort by students and other volunteers. The organisation is partly funded by the U.S. government.

== See also ==
- Elisa Spiropali
- Politics of Albania
- Color Revolution
