= Parid Cara =

Albanian politician, businessman (born 1976)

Member of the Albanian parliament
- In office 2013–2017

Personal details
- Born: 11 September 1976 (age 49) Kavajë, Albania
- Political party: Socialist Party of Albania

Parid Cara (born 11 September 1976, in Kavajë) is a businessman and former politician who served as a member of the Assembly of the Republic of Albania representing the Socialist Party.
