= Reme Lala =

Albanian politician (born 1995)

Reme Lala MP

Member of the Albanian Parliament for Dibër
- In office September 9, 2017 – September 10, 2021
- Prime Minister: Edi Rama

Personal details
- Born: 29 September 1995 (age 30) Muhurr, Dibër
- Party: Socialist Party of Albania
- Other political affiliations: PDIU (2017-2021)

Reme Lala (born 29 September 1995) is an Albanian Socialist Party of Albania politician and formerly a Member of Parliament (MP) for Dibër.

Originally belonging to the Party for Justice, Integration and Unity (PDIU), she was elected from Dibër.

On 8 March 2021 she resigned her post as member of the PDIU and joined the socialist party.
