= Tahir Muhedini =

Albanian politician

Tahir Muhedini is the honorary president of the Party for Justice, Integration and Unity. He won a council seat in the Municipality of Tirana as a result of the 2007 local elections.
