= Myslim Murrizi =

Albanian lawyer and politician (born 1968)

Leader of the Lëvizja Demokratike Shqiptare
- Incumbent
- Assumed office October 2020
- Preceded by: Office established

Deputy Speaker of the Parliament of Albania
- In office May 2019 – September 2021

Member of the Albanian Parliament
- In office 2017–2021
- Constituency: Fier County

Member of the Albanian Parliament
- In office 1997–2001
- Constituency: Lushnjë

Personal details
- Born: 14 April 1968 (age 58) Divjakë, PR Albania
- Party: Lëvizja Demokratike Shqiptare
- Other political affiliations: Democratic Party of Albania
- Education: University of Tirana; Agricultural University of Tirana
- Profession: Lawyer, politician

Myslim Murrizi (born 14 April 1968) is an Albanian lawyer, entrepreneur and politician. He is a Member of the National Council of the Democratic Party of Albania, and was later elected as a member of the Parliament of Albania for Lushnjë from 1997 to 2001, and was later elected as a member of parliament for Fier County in the 2017 parliamentary elections, serving until 2021, representing the Democratic Party of Albania. He also served as Deputy Speaker of the Parliament from May 2019 to September 2021.

In October 2020, he founded the Lëvizja Demokratike Shqiptare (Albanian Democratic Movement Party) and was elected as its first leader.

== Early life and education ==
Myslim Murrizi was born on 14 April 1968 in Divjakë, Albania.

He studied at the Faculty of Veterinary Medicine at the Agricultural University of Tirana from 1987 to 1992. Later, he attended the Faculty of Law at the University of Tirana from 2000 to 2004. In September 2005, he obtained his license to practice law (Nr. 2518).

During his student years, he participated in the 1990–1992 student movement and served as Secretary of the Democratic Party of Students at the Agricultural Institute of Tirana.

== Early career ==
Before entering politics, Murrizi held several positions in Albania's financial and tax administration: - 1992–1993: Chairman of the Financial Police, Lushnjë (Major) - 1993–1995: Chairman of the Financial Police, Berat and Lushnjë - 1995: Inspector, Ministry of Finance - 1995–1996: Chairman of Taxes and Tax Police, Lushnjë - 1996–1997: Deputy General Director of Taxes of Albania - 2002–2005: Head of Sector, Supreme State Control - 2005–2017: Worked in the private sector

== Political career ==
Murrizi has been active in Albanian politics since the 1990s as a member of several right-wing political groups. He was first elected to the Parliament of Albania representing Lushnjë in 1997, serving until 2001. He returned to parliament in 2017 as a representative for Fier County, serving until 2021. He returned to parliament in 2017 as a representative for Fier County, serving until 2021.

In 2020, he co-founded the Albanian Democratic Movement Party (LDSH) with several other deputies, presenting it as a new political force distinct from the established parties.
