= Spartak Braho =

Albanian politician

Member of Parliament
- In office 1997–2005
- In office 2013–Present

Personal details
- Born: July 17, 1951 (age 74)
- Party: Socialist Party of Albania
- Known for: Confrontations with other public figures

Spartak Braho (born July 17, 1951) is an Albanian politician and member of the Parliament, currently representing the Socialist Party of Albania. He served as a member of Parliament from 1997 to 2005, and then again from 2013 and on.

== Background ==
A former judge in communist times, Spartak Braho was involved in various controversies, where he accused former political prisoners as collaborators as neo-fascists and as people who are trying to dishonor the National War Against Nazi-Fascist Occupations.

During an interview for the Kujto.al portal, former political prisoner Gjergj Hani confessed that he was convicted in 1985 on charges of national treason, in an attempt to cross the Albanian border. According to testimony, his conviction was signed by Spartak Braho, then a judge of the military college during the communist dictatorship.

In 2019, he also accused Agron Tufa of insulting the anti-fascist resistance during WWII through the publication of books that claim that war crimes were committed by Communist guerrilla fighters.

Braho and other MPs proposed legal changes that would ban the institute from researching communist crimes. The public discourse, public threats from Braho and other figures forced Tufa to resign as head of the Institute of the Study of the Crimes of Communism and flee to Switzerland, where he also asked for political asylum.
