= Party for Justice, Integration and Unity =

Albanian political party

Party for Justice, Integration and Unity Partia Drejtësi, Integrim dhe Unitet
- Abbreviation: PDIU
- Leader: Shpëtim Idrizi
- Founded: 1 March 2011
- Merger of: Party for Justice and Integration, Party for Justice and Unity
- Headquarters: Behind the “Shqipëria Sot” exposition, Tirana
- Newspaper: Përlindja e Shqipërisë
- Youth wing: Klubi i Patriotëve të Rinj
- Ideology: Cham interests
- Political position: Right-wing
- National affiliation: Alliance for a Magnificent Albania
- Colours: Light blue Green
- Parliament: 1 / 140
- Municipality: 0 / 61
- Council Seats: 26 / 1,613

Website
- pdiu.al

The Party for Justice, Integration and Unity (Albanian: Partia Drejtësi, Integrim dhe Unitet, PDIU) is a single-issue political party in Albania whose primary aim is the promotion of Cham national issues. The party focuses on highlighting national issues, including Kosovo recognition, Albanians in North Macedonia, Montenegro, Presevo Valley and especially the Cham issue.

== Formation and leadership ==
It was formed as a union of the Party for Justice and Integration and the Party for Justice and Unity. Shpëtim Idrizi is its current chairman, while Tahir Muhedini is now the honorary president.

== PDIU involvement in 2011 general registration ==
In early October 2011, the Albanian government announced that a census would be conducted throughout the country, which would tally the exact number of ethnic minorities for the first time after 1989. However, after a proposal by the PDIU, the Albanian parliament changed the Census law, establishing a fine of $1,000 to every citizen that declares an ethnicity different from what was written down on his or her birth certificate. This applies even if the certificate was written during the communist era before 1989, where ethnic minorities were pressured to renounce their minority status.

Because of these developments, organizations that represent five minority groups in Albania decided unanimously to boycott the upcoming census. On the other hand, the PDIU, claimed that this decision was a national victory, prohibiting that way a part of local citizens (according to PDIU also non-Greek) to register as Greeks.

== Local elections ==
The PDIU placed candidates in the following places:

- Dibër County

Komuna Kalaja e Dodës - Zyber Lita

- Tiranë County

Njësia Bashkiake nr. 7 Tiranë - Krenar Alimehmeti
Bashkia Rrogozhinë - Ndriçim Dushku
Komuna Golem - Engjëll Murrizi

- Durrës County

Bashkia Sukth - Sherif Fortuzi
Komuna Bubq, Krujë - Skënder Gjoni

- Elbasan County

Bashkia Librazhd - Shefki Çota
Komuna Kukri, Gramsh - Behar Kokla

- Fier County

Bashkia Patos - Dilaver Kamberaj

- Vlorë County

Komuna Markat - Ismail Myrtaj
Komuna Shushicë - Lulzim Petani

In the Albanian local elections, 2011 the Party for Justice, Integration and Unity won a total of 59,499 votes throughout the country, and won the Librazhd, Sukth, and Rrogozhinë municipalities, plus Markat and Shushicë communes.

=== 2015 local elections ===
In 2015 local elections PJIU won in three municipalities: Peqin, Rrogozhine and Konispol.

== Parliamentary representation ==
Election	Votes	%	Seats	+/–	Government
2013	44,957	2.61	5 / 140		Coalition
2017	76,064	4.81	3 / 140	▼2	External support
2021	Supported PD–AN	Supported PD–AN	2 / 140	▼1	Opposition
2025	Part of ASHM	Part of ASHM	1 / 140	▼1	Opposition

=== 2013 election ===
PDIU joined the Alliance for Employment, Prosperity and Integration (Albanian: Aleanca për Punësim, Mirëqenie dhe Integrim) in the 2013 elections. The coalition was led by former Prime Minister Sali Berisha. PDIU got 44,957 votes, 2.61% translated in 4 seats in the new parliament. Shpëtim Idrizi got elected as well, bringing the number of seats to 5, but he came through the list of Democratic Party in Fier County.

1. Aqif Rakipi for Elbasan County
2. Dashamir Tahiri for Vlorë County
3. Omer Mamo for Fier County
4. Tahir Muhedini for Tiranë County
5. Mesila Doda for Fier County (joined after leaving the Democratic Party)

=== 2017 parliamentary elections ===
In 2017, PDIU won three mandates of deputies: 2 in Elbasan (Aqif Rakipi and Bujar Muca) and 1 in Diber (Reme Lala). Shpetim Idrizi and Mesila Doda published videos in Facebook that their votes were stolen from another party, so the votes in Tirana were recounted, but they couldn't get their mandates either.

=== 2021 parliamentary elections ===
In 2021, PDIU joined the Coalition PD–AN (Note: Alliance led by PD. The other members are PDIU, PR, PAA, LZHK, PDK, FRD, PBKD, PBDNJ, BLD, PBD, PLL, PKD) and won three mandates of deputies.

1. Nusret Avdulla for Fier County
2. Shpetim Idrizi for Tiranë County
3. Mesila Doda for Tiranë County

== See also ==
- Shoqata Çameria
