= Vasilika Hysi =

Albanian politician and diplomat (born 1963)

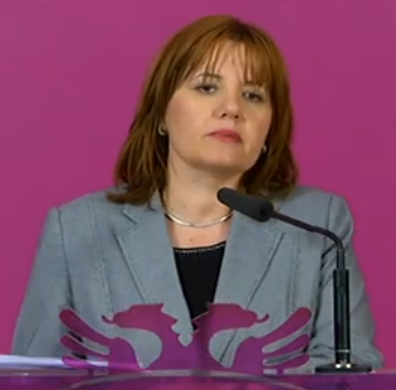
- At a press conference in 2013

Permanent Representative of Albania to the United Nations Office at Geneva
- Incumbent
- Assumed office July 2023
- President: Bajram Begaj
- Prime Minister: Edi Rama

Deputy Speaker of the Parliament of Albania
- In office 2017–2021

Member of the Albanian Parliament
- In office 2009–2021

Personal details
- Born: Vasilika Llambi Hysi; 13 January 1963 (age 63) Tirana, PR Albania
- Party: Socialist Party of Albania
- Education: University of Tirana
- Occupation: Politician, diplomat, jurist

Vasilika Hysi (born 13 January 1963) is an Albanian politician, jurist and diplomat who has served as Albania's Permanent Representative to the United Nations Office and other International Organizations in Geneva since July 2023. She previously served as Deputy Speaker of the Albanian Parliament and as a member of Parliament from 2009 to 2021.

== Early life and education ==
Hysi was born in Tirana, Albania. She completed her secondary education at Qemal Stafa High School in 1981.

From 1981 to 1985, she studied law at the Faculty of Political and Legal Sciences at the University of Tirana, where she earned the title of Jurist.

Between 1985 and 1992, she pursued postgraduate studies at the Faculty of Law at the University of Tirana and was awarded the academic degree of Candidate of Sciences in law.

== Political and diplomatic career ==
Hysi was first elected to the Parliament of Albania in 2009 and was re-elected for two more terms, serving until 2021. During her tenure, she focused on legislative matters concerning human rights, judicial reform, and gender equality. From 2017 to 2021, she served as Deputy Speaker of the Parliament.

In July 2023, she was appointed as the Permanent Representative of Albania to the United Nations Office at Geneva. In this role, she represents Albania in international forums and organizations, including the World Health Organization, UNHCR, and the World Trade Organization.
