= Besnik Dushaj =

Albanian politician

Member of the Albanian parliament
- Incumbent
- Assumed office 2009

Personal details
- Political party: Democratic Party

Besnik Dushaj is a member of the Assembly of the Republic of Albania for the Democratic Party of Albania.
