= Communist Party of Albania (1991) =

Communist party in Albania

Communist Party of Albania Partia Komuniste e Shqipërisë
- Abbreviation: PKSH
- General Secretary: Qemal Cicollari
- Founder: Hysni Milloshi
- Founded: 14 December 1991
- Split from: PPSH
- Preceded by: PPSH
- Headquarters: Tirana
- Newspaper: Zëri i së Vërtetës (The Voice of Truth)
- Youth wing: Communist Youth of Albania
- Ideology: Communism; Marxism–Leninism; Hoxhaism
- International affiliation: ICMLPO; IMCWP
- Seats in Parliament: 0 / 140

Website
- http://www.pksh.al

The Communist Party of Albania (Albanian: Partia Komuniste e Shqipërisë, PKSh) is an anti-revisionist Marxist–Leninist party in Albania. The party was formed in 1991, as a split from the Party of Labour of Albania, which converted itself into the Socialist Party of Albania. It upholds Enver Hoxha and Hoxhaism. The party was led by Hysni Milloshi until he died in 2012.

Nexhmije Hoxha, Enver Hoxha's wife, was a member of the party.

== History ==
On 16 July 1992, the Albanian parliament voted to ban the party and its newspaper. A law that took effect in June allowed leaders of political parties, members of parliament, and government ministers to keep weapons and as the party was banned, its leader, Hysni Milloshi, was arrested on 22 July 1992 for illegal weapons possession.

The law banning the Communist Party of Albania was repealed in April 1998, and the PKSH became the first communist party after 1991 to legally register at the Electoral Commission.

In 2002, a faction of PKSH split and merged into the refounded Albanian Party of Labour. In a 2006 unification congress, the Communist Party of Albania, Albanian Party of Labour and smaller communist parties merged as the Communist Party of Albania. 300 members of these parties participated in this congress and Hysni Milloshi was the leader of the unified party.

In the 2005 parliamentary elections, the party gained 8,901 votes (0.7%) on the proportional list. However, at the 2013 elections, its number of votes declined sharply, gathering 899 votes nationwide. In the 2017 parliamentary elections, it gathered 1,029 votes (0.07%).

In October of 2026, the Communist Party of Albania expressed its support of the 2026 student protests in Albania. They condemned police actions against the demonstrators and stated their demands were very legitimate.

PKSH publishes Zëri i së Vërtetës ('The Voice of Truth'). The youth wing of the party is known as the Communist Youth of Albania.

== General Secretaries of the Communist Party of Albania ==
- Hysni Milloshi (14 December 1991 – 25 April 2012)
- Qemal Cicollari (25 April 2012 – present)

== See also ==
- List of anti-revisionist groups
