= 2017 Albanian parliamentary election =

- 25 June 2017
- All 140 seats in the Parliament of Albania; 71 seats needed for a majority
- Turnout: 46.75% (▼6.71pp)
Party	Leader	Vote %	Seats	+/–
PS	Edi Rama	48.34	74	+9
PD	Lulzim Basha	28.85	43	−7
LSI	Petrit Vasili	14.28	19	+3
PDIU	Shpëtim Idrizi	4.81	3	−1
PSD	Skënder Gjinushi	0.95	1	+1
This lists parties that won seats. See the complete results below.
Most voted-for party by administrative unit and county
Prime Minister before	Prime Minister after
Edi Rama; PS	Edi Rama; PS

Parliamentary elections were held in Albania on 25 June. They had initially been scheduled for 18 June, but after a possible boycott was announced by opposition parties during a political crisis that lasted three months, an agreement was reached between all parties on 18 May to change the date. The Socialist Party won 74 of the 140 seats.

== Background ==
The previous parliamentary elections were held on 23 June 2013 and resulted in a victory for the Socialist Party of Albania-led Alliance for a European Albania, which received 57.6% of the vote, winning 83 of the 140 seats. The opposition Alliance for Employment, Prosperity and Integration headed by Lulzim Basha of the Democratic Party received almost 39.5% of the vote and won the other 57 seats. The Socialist Party led by Edi Rama formed the government with Rama as Prime Minister.

== Electoral system ==
The 140 members of Parliament were elected in twelve multi-member constituencies based on the twelve counties using closed list proportional representation with an electoral threshold of 3% for parties and 5% for alliances. Seats were allocated to alliances using the D'Hondt method, then to political parties using the Sainte-Laguë method.

Demographic changes led to some changes in the number of seats for some constituencies; Tirana gained two seats and Durrës one, whilst Korça, Berat and Kukës all lost a seat.

#	County	2016 population	Seats	Ch.
1	Berat	139,815	7	▼1
2	Dibër	134,153	6	Steady
3	Durrës	278,775	14	▲1
4	Elbasan	298,913	14	Steady
5	Fier	312,448	16	Steady
6	Gjirokastër	70,331	5	Steady
7	Korçë	221,706	11	▼1
8	Kukës	84,035	3	▼1
9	Lezhë	135,613	7	Steady
10	Shkodër	215,483	11	Steady
11	Tirana	811,649	34	▲2
12	Vlorë	183,105	12	Steady
Source: Instat (populations)

== Contesting parties ==
Name	Abbr.	Ideology	Leader
Albanian Democratic Christian Union	PBDKSH		Eduart Ndocaj
Christian Democratic Alliance	ADK		Zef Bushati
Christian Democratic Party of Albania	PKD	Christian democracy	Dhimiter Muslia
Communist Party	PKSH	Marxism–Leninism, anti-revisionism	Qemal Cicollari
Democratic Alliance	AD	Liberalism, centrism	Eduart Abazi
Democratic Party of Albania	PD	Centre-right, liberal conservatism, conservatism, nationalism, pro-Europeanism, economic liberalism	Lulzim Basha
Libra Party	LIBRA	Centrism, social liberalism, civic nationalism, pro-Europeanism	Ben Blushi
Arbnore National Alliance	AAK		Gjet Ndoj
New Democratic Spirit	FRD	Liberal conservatism, pro-Europeanism	Bamir Topi
Party for Justice, Integration and Unity	PDIU	Right-wing, nationalism, ethnic nationalism, Cham issue	Shpëtim Idrizi
Party for the Future of the Greek Minority	MEGA	Greek minority interests	Kristaq Kiço
People's Alliance for Justice	APD		Bilal Kola
Republican Party of Albania	PR	Right-wing, national conservatism, pro-Europeanism	Fatmir Mediu
Challenge for Albania	SFIDA!	Centrism, pro-Europeanism	Hektor Ruci
Social Democracy Party	PDS	Social democracy	Paskal Milo
Socialist Movement for Integration	LSI	Centre-left, social democracy, progressivism	Ilir Meta
Socialist Party of Albania	PS	Centre-left, social democracy, Third Way, progressivism, social liberalism	Edi Rama

== Opinion polls ==
=== Nationwide ===
Pollster	Date	Sample	PD	PS	LSI	PDIU	Libra	SFIDA!	Other parties	Lead
Exit poll	25 June 2017		30-34%	45-49%	11-15%	3-5%	-	-		15%
IPR + Ora News	19 June 2017		33%	48%	13%	1.8%	2.3%	0.5%		15%
IPR + Ora News	7 June 2017	800	37%	45%	13%	1.5%	2%	0.3%	–	8%
Piepoli	6 June 2017	800	28-32% 41-45 seats	48-52% 69-73 seats	9-13% 14-18 seats	1-2% 2-4 seats	1-3% 1-3 seats	1-3% 1-3 seats	–	20%
IPR + Ora News	29–30 May 2017	2,002	36%	43%	12%	1.8%	2.3%	1.0%	3.9%	7%

=== By county ===
==== Tirana ====
Pollster	Date	Sample	PD	PS	LSI	PDIU	Libra	SFIDA!	Other parties	Lead
IPR + Ora News	29–30 May 2017	1,000	33%	41%	14%	1%	6%	1.5%	3.5%	8%

==== Elbasan ====
Pollster	Date	Sample	PD	PS	LSI	PDIU	Libra	SFIDA!	Other parties	Undecided	Lead
American Eye	4 June 2017	1,034	29.2%	46.1%	6.4%	7.1%	0.7%	-	3.4%	7.1%	16.9%

== Results ==
Graph of the party split among 140 seats.
Party	Votes	%	Seats	+/–
Socialist Party of Albania	764,750	48.34	74	+9
Democratic Party of Albania	456,413	28.85	43	–7
Socialist Movement for Integration	225,901	14.28	19	+3
Party for Justice, Integration and Unity	76,069	4.81	3	–1
Libra Party	19,806	1.25	0	New
Social Democratic Party of Albania	14,993	0.95	1	+1
New Democratic Spirit	5,146	0.33	0	0
Sfida për Shqipërinë	3,546	0.22	0	New
Republican Party of Albania	3,225	0.20	0	–3
Social Democracy Party of Albania	2,473	0.16	0	0
Christian Democratic Party of Albania	2,421	0.15	0	–1
Ethnic Greek Minority for the Future	2,287	0.14	0	0
People's Alliance for Justice	1,505	0.10	0	New
Communist Party of Albania	1,026	0.06	0	0
Albanian Democratic Christian Union	924	0.06	0	New
Christian Democratic Alliance	767	0.05	0	0
Democratic Alliance Party	547	0.03	0	0
National Arbnore Alliance	351	0.02	0	0
Total	1,582,150	100.00	140	0
Valid votes	1,582,150	98.02		
Invalid/blank votes	31,898	1.98		
Total votes	1,614,048	100.00		
Registered voters/turnout	3,452,324	46.75		
Source: KQZ

=== Results by county ===
Constituency	PS			PD			LSI			PDIU			PSD			Seats
Constituency	%	Votes	Seats	%	Votes	Seats	%	Votes	Seats	%	Votes	Seats	%	Votes	Seats	Seats
Berat	54.53	45,637	4	19.48	16,302	1	23.62	19,764	2	0.76	635	–	0.03	26	–	7
Dibër	34.46	24,795	2	29.65	21,331	2	17.05	12,267	1	17.52	12,605	1	0.04	27	–	6
Durrës (Note: KQZ has incomplete or incorrect stats in Gjirokastër County and Durrës County)	49.68	73,066	8	29.35	43,163	4	14.92	21,941	2	3.07	4,519	–	0.33	489	–	14
Elbasan	44.59	72,881	7	20.72	33,868	3	14.40	23,536	2	18.00	29,431	2	0.04	61	–	14
Fier	57.15	104,162	10	25.68	46,799	4	11.73	21,380	2	3.48	6,348	–	0.04	80	–	16
Gjirokastër (Note: KQZ has incomplete or incorrect stats in Gjirokastër County and Durrës County)	50.20	27,222	3	24.57	13,321	1	23.23	12,597	1	0.32	171	–	0.05	26	–	5
Korçë	48.39	62,787	6	32.51	42,177	4	15.00	19,465	1	1.54	2,003	–	0.05	60	–	11
Kukës	43.79	18,387	1	47.48	19,935	2	7.00	2,938	–	0.03	13	–	0.20	82	–	3
Lezhë	41.55	30,406	3	37.65	27,550	3	15.32	11,210	1	2.90	2,125	–	0.04	32	–	7
Shkodër	35.68	39,247	4	37.06	40,763	5	11.58	12,737	1	1.97	2,172	–	12.02	13,226	1	11
Tirana	48.24	200,517	18	30.81	128,065	11	13.45	55,894	5	2.99	12,434	–	0.20	814	–	34
Vlorë	60.31	65,684	8	21.31	23,207	3	11.24	12,246	1	3.31	3,608	–	0.06	64	–	12
Total	48.34	764,750	74	28.85	456,413	43	14.28	225,901	19	4.81	76,069	3	0.95	14,993	1	140
