= Astrit Patozi =

Albanian politician (born 1964)

Member of the Albanian parliament
- In office 2005–2013

Personal details
- Born: July 22, 1964 (age 61) Kavajë, PR Albania
- Party: Democratic Party of Albania (1997–2019); Democratic Obedience Party (2019–2025)

Astrit Patozi (born 22 July 1964 in Kavajë) is an Albanian politician and former member of the Assembly of the Republic of Albania. As one of the closest associates of former prime minister Sali Berisha, he served as deputy leader of the Democratic Party and also as head of its parliamentary group. On 23 April 2019, he became the coordinator of the newly born political party on the center-right of the Albanian political scene, Democratic Conviction.

== Career as a journalist ==
- From 1992 to 1995 he worked at the Albanian Telegraphic Agency and later Newspaper "Rilindja" and "olti".
- From 1995 to 1997 he was the editor-in-chief of Newspaper "Albania".
- From 1997 to 2005 he was the Editor-in-chief of Newspaper "Rilindja Demokratike".

== Career as a politician ==
- 1997–present : Member of the democratic Party's National Council
- 2002–present : Member of the Democratic Party's Directorate
- 2005-2007: Member of the Foreign Affairs Commission
- 2006: Commission Head for the inquiry to prosecute Theodori Sollaku, then Albania's Prosecutor General
- 2007-2009: Head of the Democratic Party's Parliamentary Group
- 2019-2025: Coordinator of Democratic Conviction Party of Albania
