= Cham issue =

Greek-Albanian political dispute

The Cham issue is a controversy which has been raised by Albania since the 1990s over the repatriation of the Cham Albanians, who were expelled from the Greek region of Epirus between 1944 and 1945, at the end of World War II, citing the collaboration of the majority of them with the occupying forces of the Axis powers. While Albania believes that the issue should be re-opened, Greece considers the matter closed. However, it was agreed that a bilateral commission should be created, but only in regard to the issue of property, as a technical problem. The commission was established in 1999, but has not yet functioned.

== Background ==
In the late Ottoman period, tensions between the Muslim Chams and the local Greek Orthodox Christian population emerged as the result of communal conflicts that continued during the Balkan Wars, when part of the historic region of Epirus, including the area of Chameria, became part of Greece. During the course of the First Balkan War, a majority of Cham Albanians, perhaps reluctantly, sided with the Ottoman forces against Greek forces and formed irregular armed units and burned Christian Orthodox-inhabited settlements, with only a few Albanian beys willing to accept Greek rule in the region. As a response to this action, Greek guerilla units were organized in the region. After the Balkan wars and during the interwar period, the Muslim Chams were not integrated into the Greek state and faced discrimination. They were enumerated for the 1923 Population exchange between Greece and Turkey, and some were relocated to Turkey, while their property was confiscated by the Greek state, as part of the Treaty of Lausanne. In addition, Orthodox Cham Albanians were counted as Greeks, and their language and heritage were under great pressure to assimilate.

In the interwar period, Italy's fascist regime initiated an aggressive pro-Albanian propaganda campaign and cultivated Albanian irredentism by committing to the expansion of Albania to include Chameria in Greece as part of a Greater Albanian state and mobilized ethnic Albanians in tactical army units and fascist militia inside Albania, and groups of spies, saboteurs and irregulars in Greece. The latter had orders from Galeazzo Ciano to create unrest in Chameria, while Italy was preparing for an invasion of Greece in October 1940 from Albania, then a protectorate of Italy. In August 1940 the killing, possibly by Greek police, of an Albanian perhaps acting as a saboteur, was used by Italy as a pretext to worsen relations with Greece and as propaganda in Albania. When Italy began its invasion of Greece on 28 October 1940, there were at least two battalions of Albanian fascist militia opposing local Greeks in the Korca area. Italy's Prime Minister, Benito Mussolini claimed publicly that two Albanian battalions were attached to each Italian division that invaded Greece. During the German-Italian occupation of Greece (1941–1944), the Italians gained control of Greek Epirus and proposed its annexation to Albania but the Germans opposed this. However, a small portion of Epirus came under the administration of Tirana, known as "Këshilla".

== Political positions ==
=== Chams' position ===
In January 1991, as the Communist Party of Albania was disintegrating, the Chameria National Political Association was founded as a political lobby to "express and defend" the interests of the people of Chameria. The main demand of the Muslim Cham Albanians is the restoration of Greek citizenship, in addition to continuing citizenship of their country of current residence, and the recognition of a minority status. Restoration of property is another substantial issue, some seeking only financial compensation. According to most Chams, money is not as important as citizenship.

A peaceful resolution of the Cham issue is sought, in regard to the following matters:

- The implementation of basic human rights by the Greek state;
- The recognition of Cham assets and restitution and any other rights which derive from it;
- Recognition of the right of the Cham population to return to its autochthonous lands;
- Recognition and protection of the Cham by the international community;
- The same rights that the Greek minority in Albania enjoys.

=== Albania's position ===
The controversial Cham issue has lain dormant in recent years and none of the post-war Albanian governments, whether communist, democratic or socialist, have made it a key issue in relations with Greece.

Protests held by Cham organizations were ignored in Albania by both the Democratic Party and the Socialist Party. This is seen by some analysts as an attempt to strengthen the negotiating power of the Albanian government by not raising the Cham Issue, while it could legitimately claim that it was obliged to raise the Cham question because of such strong pressure from the Cham community. The major Cham march of 2006, also strengthened the position of the Albanian government because it provided additional arguments in the controversy over the graves of Greek soldiers on Albanian territory. The Albanian government used as a justification the fact that Greece did not allow Chams to pay homage at the graves of their forefathers, while they were asking to build several cemeteries for its soldiers killed in Albania during the Second World War.

Although the Albanian government has avoided addressing the Cham issue, prominent Albanian individuals such as former President Rexhep Meidani and Sabri Godo have raised the subject publicly on a number of occasions.

The Cham issue was raised during a visit to Athens of former Albanian Prime Minister Ilir Meta at the end of 1999, during his meeting with Greek Prime Minister, Kostas Simitis, but it received a negative response.

On December 10, 2012, Shpëtim Idrizi and Dashamir Tahiri, two members of the Albanian Parliament from the Party for Justice, Integration and Unity, presented to other MP's a resolution where the PDIU asked from Greece reparations in the amount of 10 Billion Euros for the Expulsion of Cham Albanians.

=== Greece's position ===
The Greek government considers the Cham Issue closed. The official Greek position is that Cham Albanians will not be allowed to return in Greece "because they have collaborated with the Italian-German invaders during the Second World War, and as such they are war criminals and are punished according to Greek laws". In an attempt to resolve the matter, in 1992 Prime minister Konstantinos Mitsotakis proposed a compromise in regard to property claims, saying that only in cases:

- when it could be established that Chams had not been convicted or participated in crimes against fellow Greeks and they fled Greece only because of the fear of persecution.
- if the Albanian government also agreed to compensate ethnic Greeks who had lost property as the result of persecution during the communist era in Albania

This proposal, however, did not achieve anything.

When the former Albanian Prime-Minister, Ilir Meta raised the issue with his counterpart, Kostas Simitis, the latter believed it was done so mainly for home consumption to Albanian journalists covering his visit. Simitis confirmed that Albania expected the Greek government to solve the issue of Cham properties according to the European conventions by which Greece abides.

The approval of the Cham resolution by the Albanian Parliament was seen by the Greek ambassador in Tirana as "a non-friendly act by Albania.” The leader of the Greek Minority Party in Albania, Vangjel Duke, meanwhile declared that "this resolution comes at a time when the Balkan region is witnessing intensive events and a period of fragile balances, and the approval of such a resolution would damage those balances that could result in a high political cost for Albania’s foreign policy."

=== International position ===
The Cham Issue has not been in the agenda of international organizations. Delegates of the Cham community have started since 1991, an attempt to internationalize the Cham Issue, while the only official support for this issue, has come from Turkey. Meanwhile, in 2006, Members of the European Parliament backed the issue and proposed a resolution, which was not put into vote.

The only major attempt to internationalize the Cham Issue was in 2005, when representatives from the Cham community in Albania met with members of the European Parliament in Strasbourg. European MEP, Doris Pack, Chairperson of the European Parliamentary Delegation for South-Eastern Europe was presented with a dossier about the Cham issue and promised to investigate the possibility for the Chams to visit their homeland and their family graves in Greece, as well as the issue will be discussed with Albania and Greek European MEPs. Other Members of the European Parliament promised to look at the possibility of proposing a Parliamentary Resolution which would seek to open a dialogue between Athens and Tirana, with the representation of Chams and international mediators.

Turkey, meanwhile, is finding the Cham dispute a useful tool with which to draw international attention to the situation of the Muslim minority in western Thrace. Turkish Ministry of Foreign Affairs has accused Greece for genocide onto Muslim Albanians. Turkey asked Greece to acknowledge the Albanian nationality of Albanian-speaking Orthodox Christians in the same area, to compensate the displaced Chams for the property they have lost, to provide an Albanian Orthodox Church for Albanian Christians, to repatriate the Cham minority and to provide them with Greek citizenship.

== Citizenship issue ==
=== Greek vs. Albanian ===
The main part of the Cham issue is the regaining of the Greek citizenship, by Cham Albanians. As Greece does not acknowledge the Cham issue, as an existent problem between Athens and Tirana, the returning of the citizenship has not been discussed at all. Cham Albanians were Greek citizens of Albanian ethnicity, since 1913 when they chose the Greek nationality and not the Turkish one.

When they were expelled, in 1944, the citizenship of 1,930 Cham Albanians was removed after they were sentenced to death in absentia as collaborators. The rest, which formed the majority lost their citizenship, under a special law of 1947. Orthodox Chams remained in Greece and retained the Greek citizenship, but without any minority rights. The evicts were organized as refugees in Albania, under the authority of the National Anti-Fascist Cham Committee, until 1953. At that year the Albanian government disbanded the committee and granted forcefully the Albanian citizenship to the Chams. In Turkey and the United States, Cham Albanians got Turkish and American citizenship respectively.

=== Claims and response ===
Cham Albanians claim the returning of the Greek citizenship, as a first phase in order to resolve the Cham issue. They are reported not to have as a primary issue the regaining of the properties, but the citizenship, because this is seen by Chams as an excuse for their suffering. They argue that the remove of their citizenship was a collective punishment, when even the Greek courts have charged only a minority of Chams for alleged crimes. They have asked the Greek government to have dual citizenship, a policy followed by Greece in the case of the Greek minority in Albania. On the other hand, Greece says that the Cham issue is a closed chapter in the relations between Greece and Albania, and as such, does not accept this claim.

== Property issue ==
=== Background ===
The Alienation of Muslim Chams property did not start at the end of World War II when they were expelled. There were four different laws, from 1923 to 1937, that alienated the properties of the Muslim Cham Albanians, as a stipulation of the Convention Concerning the Exchange of Greek and Turkish Populations. Respectively, the immobile property of Greeks evacuating Asia Minor was allienated by Turkey and given to Muslims from Greece. However, the Greek refugees who came from Asia Minor were three times more than the Muslim refugees who left Greece. Following these events, the Greek policy was that properties belonging to either Muslim citizens in Greece, who were exempt from the exchange of populations, or to foreign citizens to be taken. The first law was passed on 15 February 1923, which alienated the lands and second homes of Muslim Cham Albanians, in order to give it to Greek refuges for Asia Minor and to Greek farmers, that had no land.

After this law, Muslim Cham Albanians tried to regain their properties, under the Greek Law of 1926, which gave them the opportunity to bring to courts this confiscation. Under these circumstances, Greece passed two laws, in 1930 and 1931, which gave bigger compensations to the Muslim community. But, both of them were executed very limited, because of the change of the Greek government. The final law that nationalized the whole properties of Muslim Cham Albanians and other Albanian nationals in Greece was passed in 1937. This law confiscated all properties of Albanians in Greece and the compensation that it provided were delayed, something which was seen as a provocation.

=== Nationalization ===
After World War II, Cham Albanian's properties were put under escrow by the Greek state. In 1953, the Greek parliament passed a law, that considered as "abandoned" the rural immovable properties, whose owner had left Greece without permission or passport. After three years the properties were nationalized. While homes were nationalized in 1959, when a law passed by the Greek parliament considered them abandoned and allowed their conquest by other inhabitants of the region. These two laws nationalized Chams properties, and allowed others to settle in their homes, but the ownership was under the Greek state.

Under these laws, a number of other inhabitants of Epirus settled in Chameria, especially, Vlachs. The homes and properties of Chams came under their administration, but the new inhabitants did not have neither the legal ownership, nor the right to sell or buy other properties of Chams. In the decades of '60s and '70s an ad hoc commission for the property alienation in Thesprotia gave by draw the rural properties to farmers with and without land, while homes and urban properties in Igoumenitsa, Paramithia, Margariti, Filiates, Perdika and Sybota were given to homeless people.

== Minority issue ==
Cham representatives in Albania ask for the return of the community in Greece and minority rights. They also request that a minority status should accepted for the Orthodox Albanian speakers that remained in Greece. Some Albanian politicians tend to support such positions, thus in January 2000, Sali Berisha, then head of the opposition demanded more rights for the Cham minority in Greece, which includes cultural rights for Albanians living in Greece: opening of an Albanian-language school in the town of Filiates, among others.

== Incidents ==
=== Diplomatic incidents ===
In 2005, a diplomatic incident occurred, when the President of Greece, Karolos Papoulias canceled his planned-meeting with Albanian homologue, Alfred Moisiu, in Saranda, because 200 Cham Albanians, were demonstrating for the Cham Issue. The Greek Ministry of Foreign Affairs stated that the Albanian authorities did not take adequate measures in order to protect the Greek President "by deterring known extremist elements, who are trying to hinder the smooth development of Greek-Albanian relations". Albanian president's office stated that President Moisiu expressed deep sorrow at this unexplainable decision, which was based upon misinformation, of the "small, peaceful and well monitored demonstration".

On 29 September 2016 the Enlargement Commissioner of the European Union Johannes Hahn mentioned the Cham issue as an existing unresolved issue between Albania and Greece, alongside other matters that the two countries needed to resolve. This statement was opposed and criticized by the Greek Foreign Minister, Nikos Kotzias, who asked the Commissioner to withdraw and correct his declaration, in what can be considered as one of his harshest tones, with a direct and threatening speech. Meanwhile, on the Albanian Parliament this statement of the Commissioner was greeted by some MP's, including Shpëtim Idrizi, leader of the Party for Justice, Integration and Unity, whose primary aim is the promotion of the cham issues and also by the Foreign Minister of Albania Ditmir Bushati.

=== Liberation Army of Chameria ===
Liberation Army of Chameria (Albanian: Ushtria Çlirimtare e Çamërisë) is a reported paramilitary formation in the northern Greek region of Epirus. The organisation is reportedly linked to the Kosovo Liberation Army and the National Liberation Army, both ethnic Albanian paramilitary organisations in Serbia and North Macedonia respectively. In 2001 the Greek police reported that the group consisted of approximately 30-40 Albanians. It does not have official support from the Albanian government.

== See also ==
- Axis-Cham Albanian collaboration
- Expulsion of Cham Albanians
- Chameria
- Cham Albanians
- Albanians
- Minorities in Greece
- Treaty of London
- Treaty of Bucharest
- Treaty of Lausanne
- Expulsion of Germans after World War II
- Axis occupation of Greece during World War II
- Collaboration during World War II
- Pursuit of Nazi collaborators
- Greek Resistance
