= Dashamir Tahiri =

Albanian politician (born 1966)

Dashamir Tahiri (born 16 September 1966) is member of the Parliament of Albania representing the Party for Justice, Integration and Unity (PDIU).

Tahiri's father was a nephew of the Albanian patriot Veli Gërra.

On 10 December 2012, Tahiri and Shpëtim Idrizi presented to Parliament a resolution in which the PDIU asked Greece for reparations in the amount of 10 billion euros for the expulsion of Cham Albanians.

== See also ==
- Politics of Albania
