= Shpëtim Idrizi =

Albanian politician (born 1967)

Member of the Albanian Parliament
- In office 2 September 2005 – 8 July 2025

Personal details
- Born: 7 July 1967 (age 57); Tirana, Albania
- Political party: Party for Justice, Integration and Unity

Shpëtim Idrizi (born 7 July 1967) is the Albanian leader of the Party for Justice, Integration and Unity (PDIU). He is a deputy in the Albanian Parliament.

On 10 December 2012, Idrizi, and Dashamir Tahiri presented to the Parliament of Albania a resolution where PDIU asked from Greece reparations in the amount of 10 Billion Euros for the Expulsion of Cham Albanians.
