= Meksi I Government =

- 54th Government of Albania
- Date formed: 19 April 1992
- Date dissolved: 6 August 1996

People and organisations
- President: Sali Berisha
- Prime Minister: Aleksandër Meksi
- Member parties: PD, PR and PSD
- Status in legislature: Coalition government
- Opposition parties: PS
- Opposition leader: Fatos Nano

History
- Election: 1992 election
- Predecessor: Technical Government
- Successor: Meksi II Government

The first Government of Prime Minister Aleksandër Meksi also known as "The First Democratic Government", is the 54th Government of the Republic of Albania formed on 19 April 1992, following the early elections of the same year when the Democratic Party led by Sali Berisha managed to win a majority of 92 seats out of 140 in the Parliament. The new government led by Meksi was approved in parliament on 13 April 1992, and took oath on 19 of the same month in the presence of the newly appointed President Sali Berisha.

== Cabinet ==
The Meksi government at the beginning of its term had a structure with 23 positions, where in addition to the prime minister, there were also 2 deputy prime ministers, who also held ministerial posts, a Secretary General of the Council of Ministers, 16 ministers and 3 committee chairmen. The Republican Party left the coalition on 4 December 1994.

Portfolio	Minister	Took office	Left office	Party
Prime Minister	Aleksandër Meksi	19 April 1992	11 July 1996	PD
1st Deputy Prime Minister	Bashkim Kopliku	19 April 1992	3 December 1994	PD
1st Deputy Prime Minister	Dashamir Shehu	4 December 1994	11 July 1996	PD
2nd Deputy Prime Minister	Rexhep Uka	19 April 1992	6 April 1993	PD
2nd Deputy Prime Minister	Dylber Vrioni	4 December 1994	11 July 1996	PD
Ministry of Finances and Economy	Genc Ruli	19 April 1992	23 November 1993	PD
Ministry of Finances and Economy	Dylber Vrioni	4 December 1994	11 July 1996	PD
Ministry of Public Order; From 4 December 1994 it was renamed Ministry of Interior	Bashkim Kopliku	19 April 1992	6 April 1993	PD
Ministry of Public Order; From 4 December 1994 it was renamed Ministry of Interior	Agron Musaraj	6 April 1993	11 July 1996	PD
Ministry of Defence	Safet Zhulali	19 April 1992	11 July 1996	PD
Ministry of Foreign Affairs	Alfred Serreqi	19 April 1992	11 July 1996	PD
Ministry of Justice	Kudret Çela	19 April 1992	3 December 1994	PD
Ministry of Justice	Hektor Frashëri	4 December 1994	11 July 1996	PD
Ministry of Transport and Communications (Note: Both departments merged with the industry department to form the Ministry of Industry, Transport and Trade)	Fatos Bitincka	19 April 1992	3 December 1994	PR
Ministry of Industry, Transport and Trade; Minister of Industry, Mining Resources and Energy (19 April 1992–10 November 1993); Ministry of Industry and Trade (11 November 1993–4 December 1994)	Abdyl Xhaja	19 April 1992	10 November 1993	PD
Ministry of Industry, Transport and Trade; Minister of Industry, Mining Resources and Energy (19 April 1992–10 November 1993); Ministry of Industry and Trade (11 November 1993–4 December 1994)	Selim Belortaja	10 November 1993	4 December 1994	PD
Ministry of Industry, Transport and Trade; Minister of Industry, Mining Resources and Energy (19 April 1992–10 November 1993); Ministry of Industry and Trade (11 November 1993–4 December 1994)	Albert Brojka	4 December 1994	16 August 1995	PD
Ministry of Industry, Transport and Trade; Minister of Industry, Mining Resources and Energy (19 April 1992–10 November 1993); Ministry of Industry and Trade (11 November 1993–4 December 1994)	Suzana Panariti	16 August 1995	11 July 1996	PD
Ministry of Education	Ylli Vejsiu	19 April 1992	6 prill 1993	PD
Ministry of Education	Xhezair Teliti	6 prill 1993	11 July 1996	PD
Ministry of Health and Environmental Protection	Tritan Shehu	19 April 1992	14 January 1994	PD
Ministry of Health and Environmental Protection	Maksim Cikuli	14 January 1994	11 July 1996	PD
Ministry of Agriculture and Food	Rexhep Uka	19 April 1992	5 April 1993	PD
Ministry of Agriculture and Food	Petrit Kalakula	6 April 1993	23 August 1993	PD
Ministry of Agriculture and Food	Hasan Halili	23 August 1993	11 July 1996	PD
Ministry of Culture, Youth and Sports	Dhimitër Anagnosti	19 April 1992	3 December 1994	PD
Ministry of Culture, Youth and Sports	Teodor Laço	4 December 1994	11 July 1996	PSD
Ministry of Tourism	Osman Shehu	19 April 1992	6 prill 1993	PD
Ministry of Tourism	Edmond Spaho	6 prill 1993	4 December 1994	PD
Ministry of Tourism	Dashamir Shehi	4 December 1994	11 July 1996	PD
Ministry of Labor, Immigration, Social Welfare and the Politically Persecuted	Dashamir Shehi	19 April 1992	3 December 1994	PD
Ministry of Labor, Immigration, Social Welfare and the Politically Persecuted	Engjëll Dakli	9 December 1994	11 July 1996	PD
Ministry of Construction, Housing and Territorial Regulation	Ilir Manushi	19 April 1992	4 December 1994	PD
