= 2021 Democratic Party of Albania leadership election =

- 13 June 2021
- Registered: 75,067
- Turnout: 54.75%
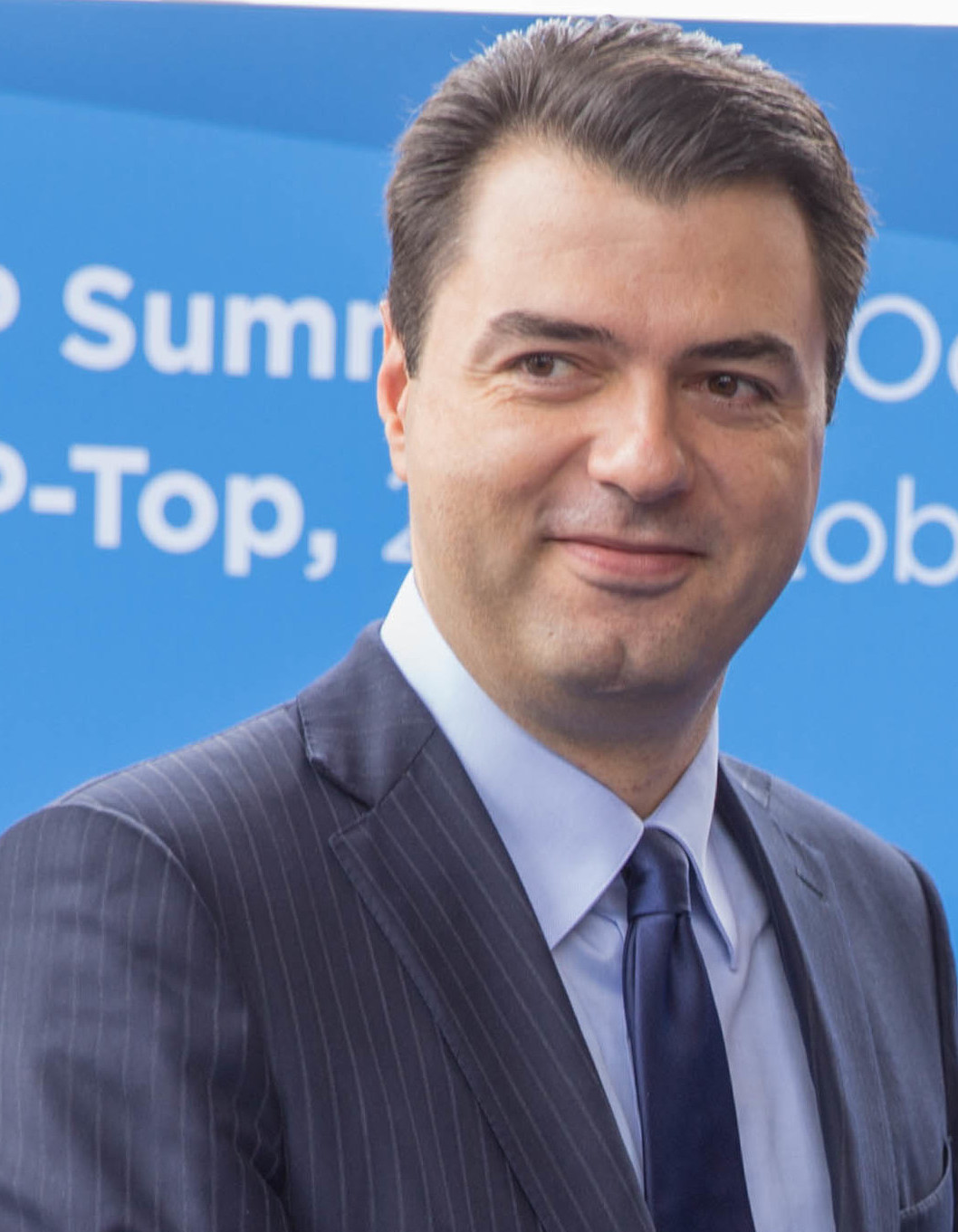

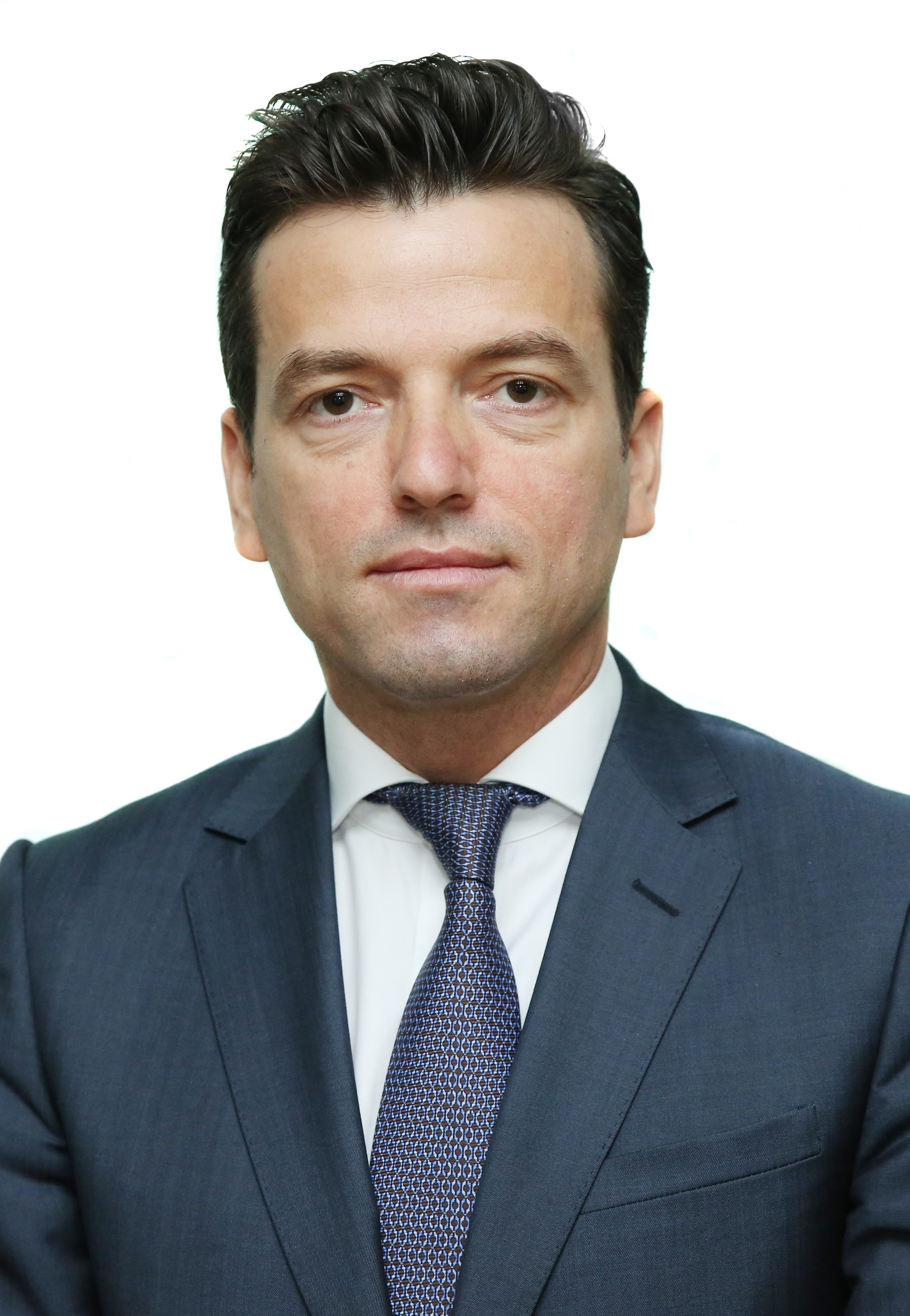
Candidate	Lulzim Basha	Agron Shehaj
Popular vote	32,882	6,038
Percentage	80.8%	14.8%
Leader before election
Lulzim Basha
Elected Leader
Lulzim Basha

The 2021 Democratic Party of Albania leadership election was triggered after the defeat of the Democratic Party in the 2021 Albanian parliamentary election, handing Prime Minister Edi Rama a historic third term for the governing Socialist Party. The election was won by the incumbent, Lulzim Basha who secured a third term as leader of the Democratic Party in a landslide victory.

== Background ==
Lulzim Basha was elected as leader of the Democratic Party following the resignation of Prime Minister Sali Berisha after his defeat in the 2013 Albanian parliamentary election. After the party's third consecutive defeat in the 2021 Albanian parliamentary election, he allowed a leadership challenge to go through, in which he announced that he will partake in the contest, although he did not step down as leader, sparking a controversy within the party ranks.

== Results ==
Candidate	Votes	%
Lulzim Basha	32,882	80.82
Agron Shehaj	6,038	14.84
Edith Harxhi	983	2.42
Fatbardh Kadilli	781	1.92
Total	40,684	100.00
Valid votes	40,684	99.00
Invalid/blank votes	413	1.00
Total votes	41,097	100.00
Registered voters/turnout	75,067	54.75
Source: ISP
