= Halili (name) =

Halili may refer to the following people:

Given name

- Halili Nagime (born 1993), Brazilian-American association football player

Surname

- Abu Zubayr Al Halili, suspected member of al-Qaeda in Morocco
- Armend Halili (born 1997), Kosovan professional footballer
- Antonio Halili (1946–2018), Filipino politician
- Argjent Halili (born 1982), Albanian football goalkeeper
- Dave Halili (born 1968), American fine arts illustrator and graphic designer
- Grent Halili (born 1998), Albanian football forward
- Hasan Halili, Albanian politician
- Jasmin Halili (born 1999), Serbian high jumper
- Katrina Halili (born 1986), Filipina actress and model
- Mahir Halili (born 1975), Albanian football player
- Mary Angeline Halili, Filipino politician
- Merita Halili (born 1966), Albanian folk singer
- Mico Halili, Filipino sports journalist
- Ndriqim Halili (born 1993), German–Albanian football player
- Nevzat Halili (born 1946), Macedonian politician
- Refik Halili, chairman and main sponsor of KF Tirana, Albania
- Sheena Halili (born 1987), Filipina actress
- Skënder Halili (1940–1982), Albanian football player
  - Skënder Halili Complex in Albania
