= Besnik Mustafaj =

Albanian writer and diplomat

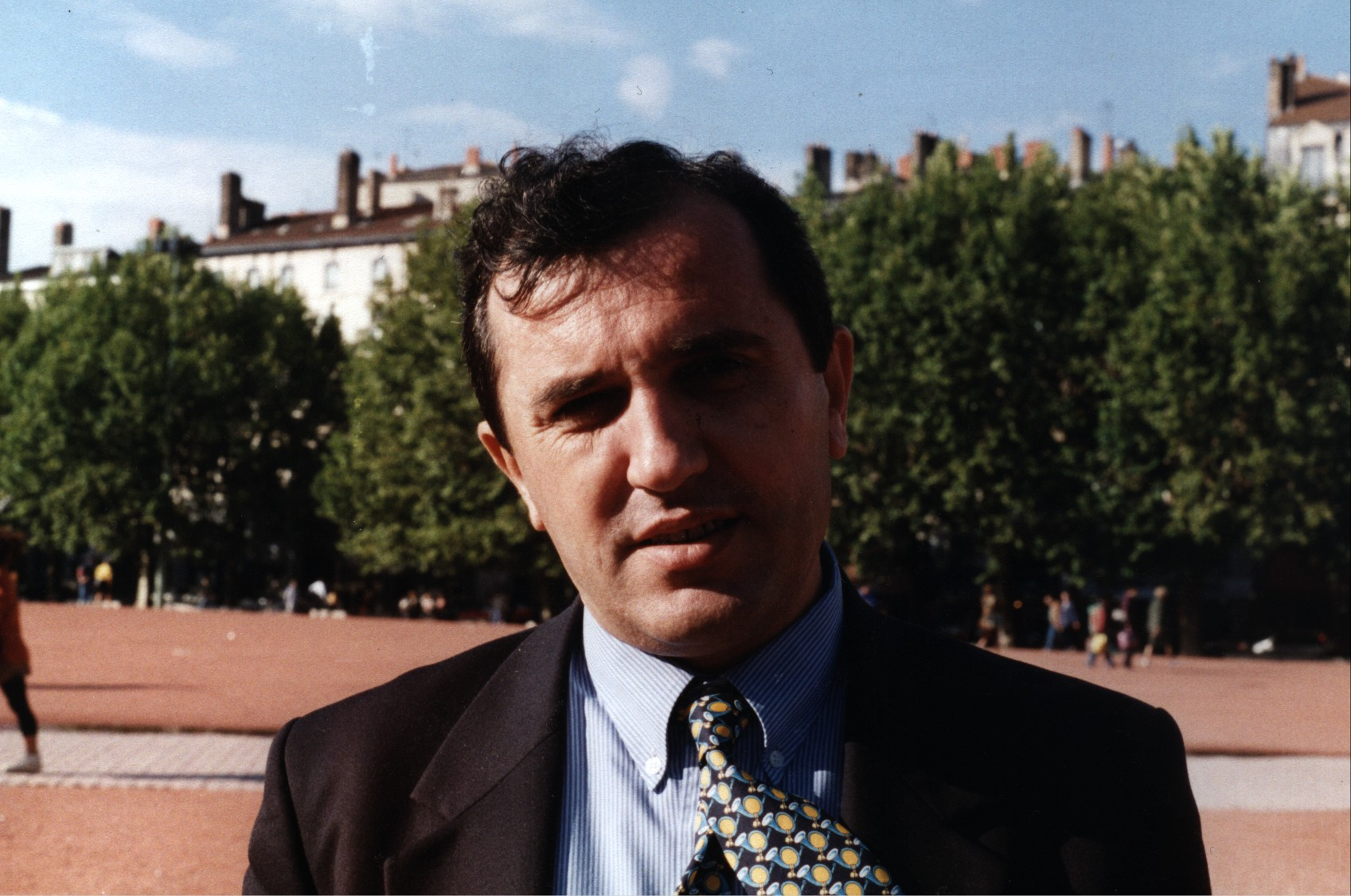
- Besnik Mustafaj in Lyon, September 1995

62nd Minister of Foreign Affairs
- In office 11 September 2005 – 24 April 2007
- Prime Minister: Sali Berisha
- Preceded by: Kastriot Islami
- Succeeded by: Lulzim Basha

Personal details
- Born: 23 September 1958 (age 67) Bajram Curri, Albania
- Party: Democratic Party

Besnik Bajram Mustafaj (born 1958) is an Albanian writer and diplomat. He was a director of the news paper Drita

== Career ==
Mustafaj is a former Albanian ambassador to France. He became 62nd foreign minister of Albania on 11 September 2005 when the government of Prime Minister Sali Berisha took office. He resigned on 24 April 2007 and was replaced by Lulzim Basha on 25 April. His resignation came after strong disagreements with Berisha. Further disagreements with the prime minister led to Mustafaj's withdrawal from politics in May 2009.

He is the board chairman of Albanian Institute for International Studies, a think tank based in Albania.
