= Abdyl Xhaja =

Albanian politician (1943–2025)

Minister of Industry, Mining and Energy
- In office 4 December 1994 – 1 March 1997
- President: Sali Berisha
- Prime Minister: Aleksandër Meksi
- Preceded by: Selim Belortaja
- Succeeded by: Albert Brojka

Deputy Prime Minister of Albania
- In office 18 December 1991 – 13 April 1992
- President: Ramiz Alia
- Prime Minister: Vilson Ahmeti
- Preceded by: Zyhdi Pepa
- Succeeded by: Bashkim Kopliku

Minister of Industry, Energy and Mineral Resources
- In office 18 December 1991 – 13 April 1992
- President: Ramiz Alia
- Prime Minister: Vilson Ahmeti
- Succeeded by: Iljaz Mehmeti

Member of the Albanian Parliament
- In office 1996–1997
- Constituency: Elbasan

Personal details
- Born: 13 March 1943 Elbasan, Albania
- Died: 25 July 2025 (aged 82)
- Party: Democratic Party of Albania

Abdyl Xhaja (13 March 1943 – 25 July 2025) was an Albanian economist and politician who served in several key government roles during the 1990s. He was Minister of Industry, Mining and Energy under Prime Minister Aleksandër Meksi from 1994 to 1997. Earlier, he was Deputy Prime Minister of Albania and Minister of Industry, Energy and Mineral Resources under Prime Minister Vilson Ahmeti from December 1991 to April 1992.

Xhaja was elected as a member of parliament representing Elbasan County from 1996 to 1997 and was a member of the National Council of the Democratic Party of Albania.

Xhaja died on 25 July 2025, aged 82.
