= Flamur Noka =

Albanian politician (born 1971)

Flamur Noka MP

Minister of the Interior
- In office 3 July 2012 – 15 September 2013
- Prime Minister: Sali Berisha
- Preceded by: Bujar Nishani
- Succeeded by: Saimir Tahiri

General Secretary of the Democratic Party
- Incumbent
- Assumed office 3 June 2022
- Preceded by: Gazment Bardhi

Member of the Albanian parliament
- Incumbent
- Assumed office 2009

Personal details
- Born: March 3, 1971 (age 55)
- Party: Democratic Party

Flamur Noka (born March 3, 1971) is an Albanian politician, currently serving as the General Secretary of the Democratic Party of Albania. Born and raised in Kukës, in Albania's northern border with Kosovo, Noka joined the Democratic Party in the early 2000s, and quickly started climbing the ranks. From 2012 to 2013, he was Albania's Minister of the Interior.

== Career ==
Noka is a medical doctor by training, specialising in oncology. He held positions within the Democratic Party of Albania. He was elected as a member of the Assembly of the Republic of Albania from the Democratic Party of Albania for the Kukes district. In June 2012, he was named the Interior Minister following Bujar Nishani's accession to the Presidency of Albania. On 16 February 2017 he went to Erjon Brace sitting in parliament and hit him in the face, he was obligated to leave the parliament. In 2013 he was replaced as Interior Minister by Saimir Tahiri after the heavy electoral defeat of the Democrat Party at the hands of the Socialists led by the new Prime Minister Edi Rama

In 2024, Noka became notable in the Greek public as a pro-Greek by supporting the Greek minority in Himarë, by participating in the electoral campaign held mostly in Greek, in favour of Petros Gikurias, a Greek-American businessman, and using Greek letters in a region non officially part of the Greek Minority zone.

Political offices
Preceded by Bujar Nishani; 2011-2012	Minister of the Interior; 2012	Incumbent
