= Halili =

Halili may refer to:

- Halili (name)
- Fortunato Halili Avenue in Bulacan, Philippines
- Dave Halili American Artist, painter
- Skënder Halili Complex in Albania
