= Zhupa =

Zhupa may refer to:

- A phonetic spelling for Župa
- Eugert Zhupa, Albanian cyclist
- Ina Zhupa, Albanian political scientist
