= Xhaja =

Xhaja is an Albanian surname. Notable people with the surname include:

- Abdyl Xhaja (1943–2025), Albanian economist and politician
- Françesko Xhaja (born 1993), Albanian-born Italian kickboxer
- Juxhin Xhaja (born 1990), Albanian football referee, FIFA-listed
