= Lulzim Basha =

Albanian politician (born 1974)

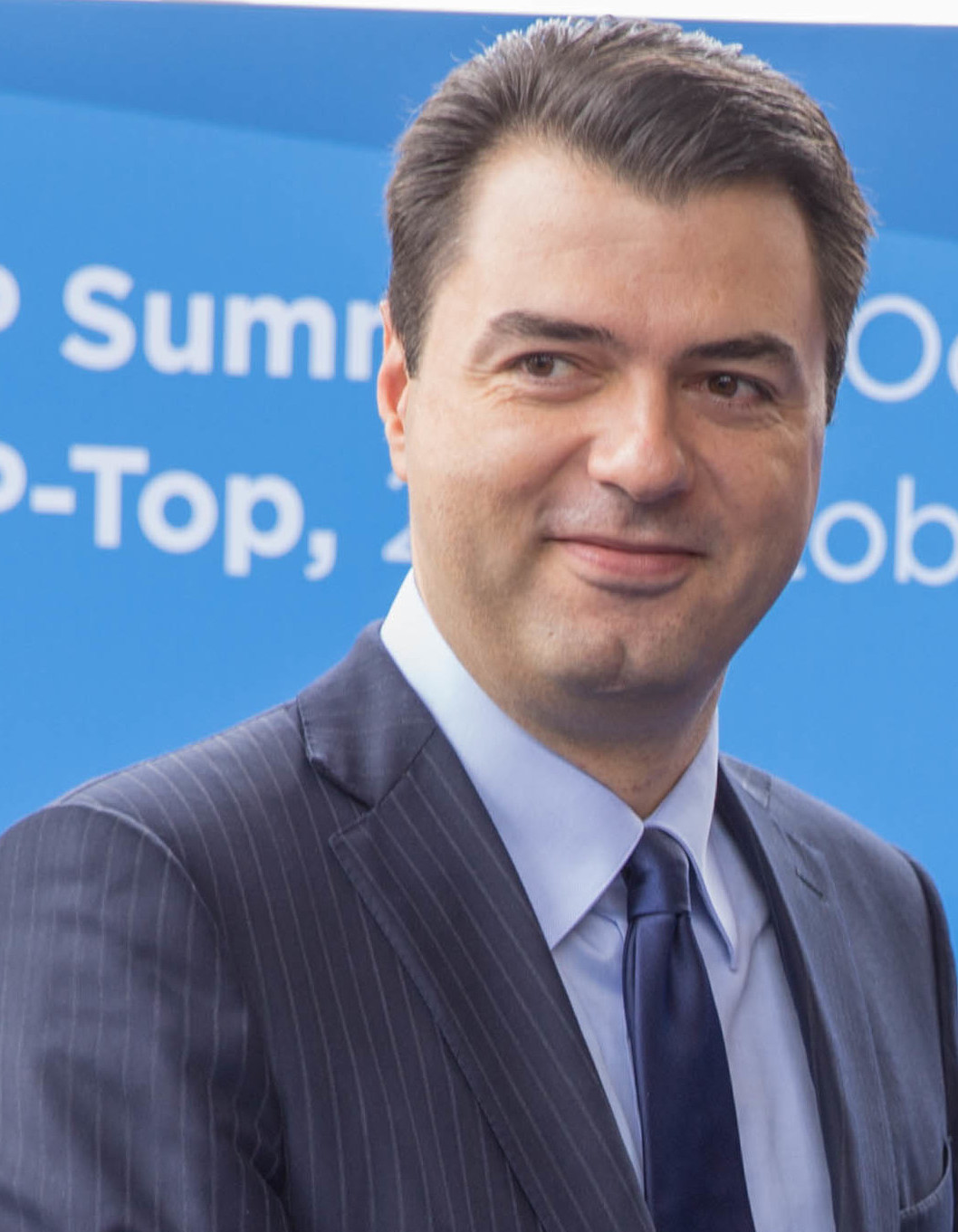
- Basha in 2016

Leader of the Opposition
- In office 15 September 2013 – 22 May 2022
- President: Bujar Nishani; Ilir Meta
- Prime Minister: Edi Rama
- Preceded by: Edi Rama
- Succeeded by: Sali Berisha

Leader of the Democratic Party
- In office 22 July 2013 – 22 May 2022
- Preceded by: Sali Berisha
- Succeeded by: Sali Berisha

41st Mayor of Tirana
- In office 25 July 2011 – 21 July 2015
- Preceded by: Edi Rama
- Succeeded by: Erion Veliaj
Other political offices
28th Minister of the Interior
In office 17 September 2009 – 25 April 2011
Prime Minister	Sali Berisha
Preceded by	Bujar Nishani
Succeeded by	Bujar Nishani
47th Minister of Foreign Affairs
In office 24 April 2007 – 17 September 2009
Prime Minister	Sali Berisha
Preceded by	Besnik Mustafaj
Succeeded by	Ilir Meta
Minister of Public Works, Transport and Telecommunications
In office 11 September 2005 – 24 April 2007
Prime Minister	Sali Berisha
Preceded by	Spartak Poçi
Succeeded by	Sokol Olldashi
Leader of the Euroatlantic Democrats
Incumbent
Assumed office 14 June 2024
Preceded by	Party established
Parliamentary offices
Member of the Albanian Parliament
In office 10 September 2021 – 8 July 2025
Constituency	Tirana County
In office 9 September 2017 – 20 February 2019
Constituency	Tirana County
In office 2 September 2005 – 25 April 2011
Constituency	Tirana County (2009-2011); 33th Constituency (2005-2009)

Personal details
- Born: 12 June 1974 (age 52) Tirana, Albania
- Party: Euroatlantic Democrats (2024–present)
- Other political affiliations: Democratic Party (2005–2024)
- Spouse: Aurela Basha
- Children: 2
- Education: Utrecht University (LLB)
- Occupation: Politician; lawyer

Lulzim Basha; born 12 June 1974) is an Albanian politician and lawyer who served as chairman of the Democratic Party of Albania and as the Leader of the Opposition from 2013 to 2022. He is the founder and leader of the political party Euroatlantic Democrats.

He was the candidate for the position of the prime minister of Albania for the Democratic Party in the 2017 Albanian parliamentary election and in the 2021 Albanian parliamentary election which he lost in both against the incumbent prime minister Edi Rama.

== Early life and education ==
Lulzim Basha was born in Tirana on 12 June 1974 to a Kosovo-Albanian mother and an Albanian father. From his mother's side, he is respectively from Mitrovica (grandfather) and Gjilan (grandmother). After attending the Sami Frashëri High School, he studied law at Utrecht University in the Netherlands and worked for the International Criminal Tribunal for the former Yugoslavia as member of the investigation team of war crimes of Serbian forces in Kosovo (1998–1999).

In 2000, Basha joined the Department of Justice of the UN administration of Kosovo,^{[a]} UNMIK, first as legal advisor and then as deputy chief of cabinet of the director of the UNMIK Justice Department since October 2001. From November 2002 until January 2005 Basha served as special advisor for transition in the same department.

Lulzim Basha is married to Aurela Basha, a Dutch citizen, and they have two daughters, Victoria and Dafina.

== Political career ==
Basha joined the Democratic Party of Albania in January 2005 and became a member of the party's leadership in May of that year. He has since held several ministerial positions in Democratic Party-led governments.

=== Berisha Cabinet (2005–2011) ===
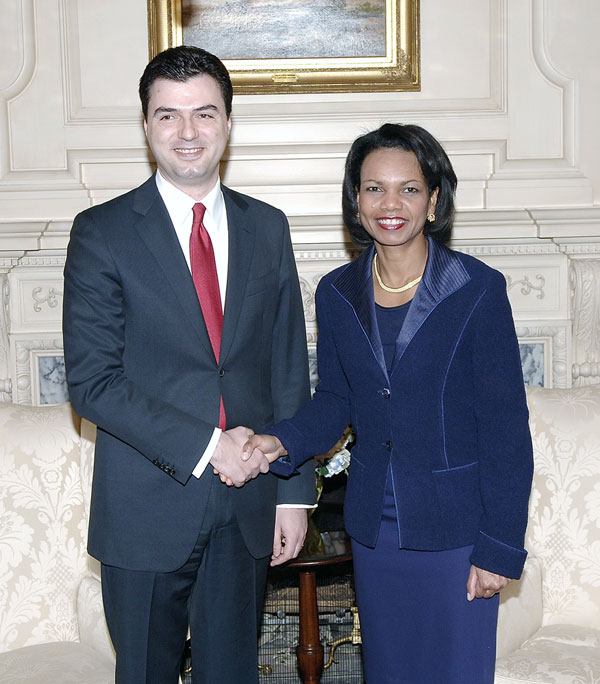
Basha with Condoleezza Rice in 2008

He served as the party's spokesperson during the 2005 parliamentary elections at which he was elected as the MP of Constituency #33 in Tirana. He was then nominated in the Berisha government as Minister of Public Works, Transport and Telecommunications, where he served for two years.

After the 2009 election, Basha was nominated as Ministry of Internal Affairs in the new Berisha government. As Minister of Interior, he implemented all the required criteria for visa-free travel to the Schengen countries, including the modernisation of the Albanian border and immigration police system, the issuing of high security biometric passports and a tougher fight against criminal activity and criminal assets. These steps won international praise, notably by EUROPOL and other law enforcement bodies, and led to the decision of the EU on 8 November 2010 to lift all travel visa requirements for Albanian citizens effective 15 December 2010.

=== Mayor of Tirana (2011–2015) ===
In 2011, Basha was the governing party's candidate for the post of mayor of Tirana. He defeated the leader of the Socialist opposition, Edi Rama, by a very narrow margin (only 81 votes after the recount) in a hotly contested election.

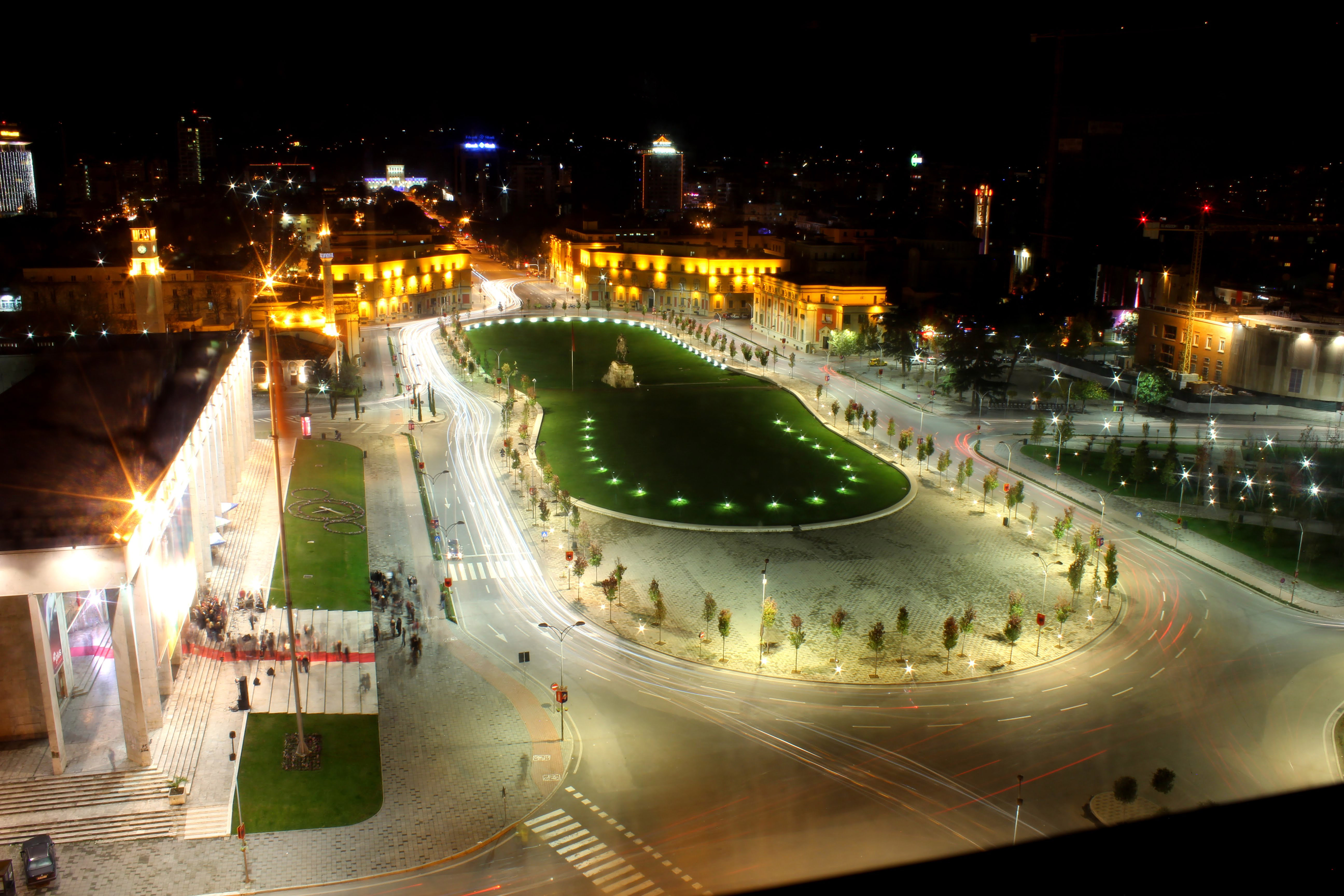
Skanderbeg Square was reconstructed during Basha's mayorship.

During his term as mayor, Basha vowed to lead big reforms in his first hundred days in office, while promising to make the municipality more accessible to citizens and free of political conflicts.

His main focus was the development of the new strategic urban plan, to increase investments and employment and solve the traffic problems in the city centre.

A draft was presented in May 2012 and it was considered as very important for the future economic development of the city. It was one of the first successes of Basha as mayor of Tirana, but the plan was opposed by the opposition.

The new Urban Development Plan proposed a number of measures, primarily with a focus on the road network and, to a smaller degree, on sustainable modes of transport. A tramway system in addition to the bus system was proposed and the plan also included the building of a new boulevard in the northern part of the city and the rehabilitation of the Lanë.

The earlier plan for the Skanderbeg Square was scrapped and a new one introduced. The use of the square by all motor vehicles will be restored through the construction of a narrower road segment around the center of the square including bicycle lanes. The existing green field south of Skanderbeg's statue was extended northward for a few hundred meters, while trees were planted in most places.

In May 2013 the City Hall launched an international tender for the construction of the capital's new northern boulevard, with a length of 1.8 km. The project was expected to be finished before Basha's first mandate as mayor, but after the 2013 parliamentary election, the new Rama Government cut off most of the funds.

Basha did not run for a second mandate in the 2015 local elections, which were won by the Socialist Party candidate Erion Veliaj.

=== Leader of the opposition (2013–2022) ===
After the defeat of the Democratic Party-led coalition in the 2013 parliamentary election and the resignation of Sali Berisha as party leader, Basha was elected as chairman of the Democratic Party on 22 July 2013, following the first one-member-one-vote election in party's history.

On 30 September 2014, a national congress of the Democratic Party was held to elect a new leadership. In the congress a tough reform of the party was announced by Basha.

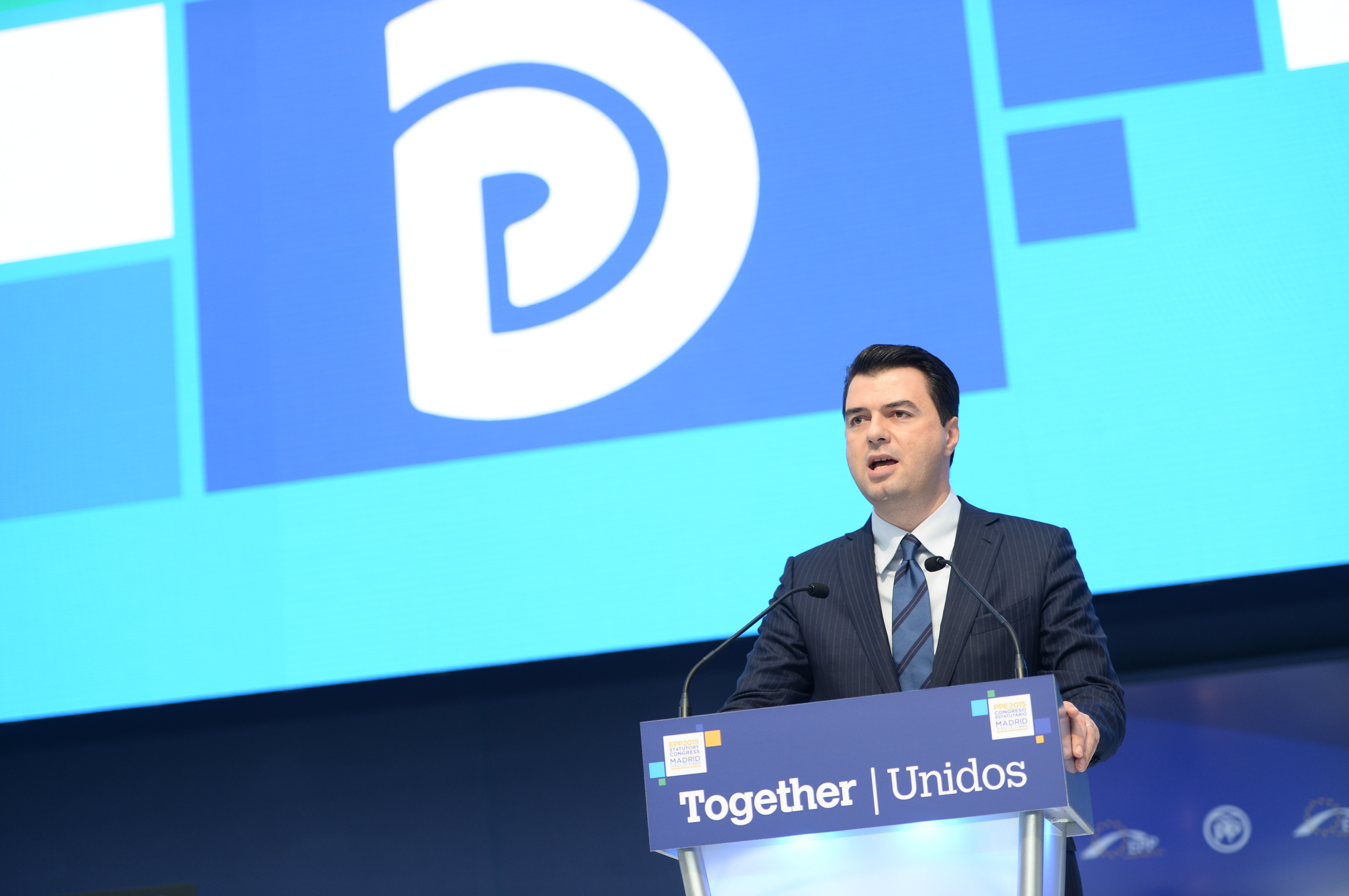
Basha during the EPP Congress in Madrid

During his leadership numerous anti-government demonstrations have been held, accusing the government as corrupt and criminalised. In 2015 the Democratic Party proposed a Decriminalisation Law, which led to several months of negotiations with the government. Finally in December 2015, the law was passed by majority in the Parliament, barring people with criminal convictions from holding public office.

On 11 December 2016, during the celebrations for the 26th anniversary of the Democratic Party, party leader Lulzim Basha announced his program for the further modernization and democratisation of the party ahead of the 2017 parliamentary elections.

After previously promising that 35% of the parliamentary candidates would consist of members from the youth movement of the party, Basha now announced a limitations of all mandates of the party leaders to a two-year term, and the full democratisation of the internal election process.

On 18 February 2017, members of the Democratic Party and other opposition parties, under the leadership of Lulzim Basha pitched a giant tent outside the Prime Minister's office in Tirana after thousands of protesters rallied to demand free elections and a technocrat government. The opposition protest further escalated into a larger political conflict. The Democratic Party and its allies refused to register to take part in the 18 June general election, until the government accepts their conditions to secure a free and democratic election.

Following the aftermath of the Democratic Party's defeat in 2021, which was considered Basha's fourth defeat in Albanian elections, a portion of the party wanted Basha to resign and replace him with a new leader. On 13 June 2021, the Democratic Party held leadership elections, were Basha won with 80% of the vote against Agron Shehaj, Edith Harxhi and Fatbardh Kadilli who managed to get 15.55%, 2.45% and 2% respectively.

=== Dispute with Sali Berisha ===
Following the United States' decision in Public Designation of Sali Berisha, Basha made the decision to expel Berisha from the party. This caused a major split in the party and made Basha unpopular, with many members siding with Berisha and leaving the party. On 11 December 2021, Berisha held an informal congress that voted in favor to remove Basha as leader of the party; this, however, was not recognised by the party, with Basha declaring it illegitimate and non-binding.

On 21 March 2022, Basha resigned as leader of the Democratic Party of Albania, making Enkelejd Alibeaj the leader of the Democratic Party of Albania.

On 30 July 2023, Basha was reelected controversially as leader of the Democratic Party. Prior to the election, Gazment Bardhi claimed that Basha was trying to seize exclusive power in the party.

=== Loss of logo (11 June 2024) ===
On 11 June 11, 2024, the Court of Appeals voted against Lulzim Basha's claim on the logo and signature of the Democratic Party, giving it to the re-establishment faction led by Sali Berisha.

== Political positions ==
=== EU integration ===
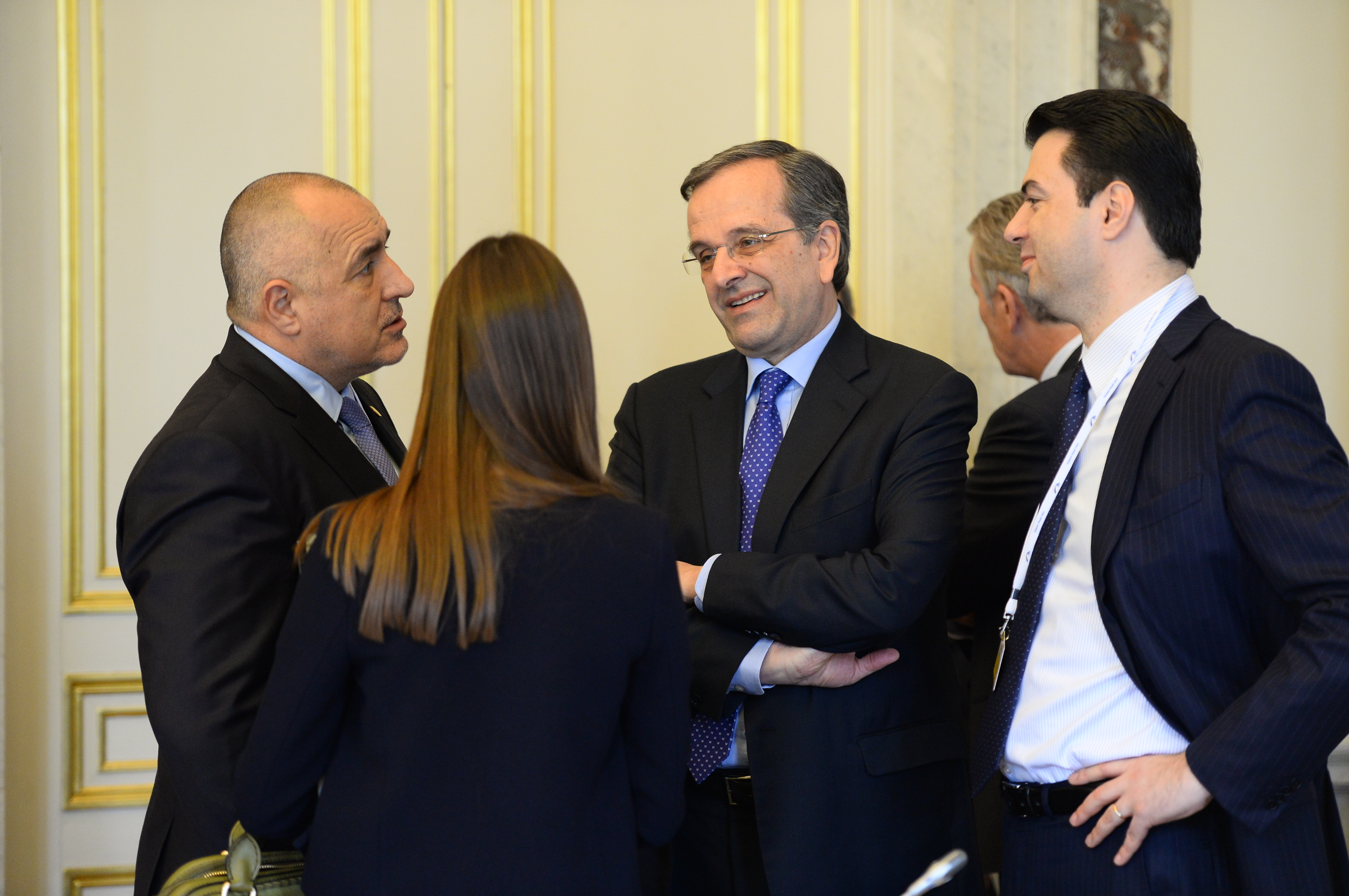
Basha meeting with leaders of the European People's Party during the EPP Summit, March 2015, Brussels

Basha is a strong supporter of Albania joining the EU.

=== Economy ===
During the 2017 Albanian parliamentary election he proposed reinstating the flat tax at a 9% rate. The flat tax was a form of taxation which had been applied by Berisha's government between 2005 and 2013.

=== Foreign affairs ===
In June 2017, Basha met with President Donald Trump during a visit to the US as part of participation in White House Workforce Development week.

== Controversies ==
=== Durrës-Kukës highway allegations ===
As the Minister of Transportation and Public Works from 2005 to 2007, Basha was responsible for the construction of the Durrës-Kukës highway to Kosovo, the country's largest public work. In connection to this, in October 2007, the Prosecutor's Office accused him of abuse of power and breaking tender rules and claimed these irregularities cost Albanians more than €230 million. Eventually the court dismissed the case on technical grounds relating to his immunity as the new minister of interior. Basha asked for his parliamentary immunity to be lifted in order for the justice to conduct a full investigation, and that was lifted by parliament on 28.12.2007.

Political offices
Preceded by Besnik Mustafaj	Minister of Foreign Affairs; 2007–2009	Succeeded by Ilir Meta
Preceded by Bujar Nishani	Minister of the Interior; 2009–2011	Succeeded by Bujar Nishani
Preceded by Edi Rama	Mayor of Tirana; 2011–2015	Succeeded by Erion Veliaj
Preceded by Edi Rama	Leader of the Opposition; 2013–2022	Succeeded by Sali Berisha
Party political offices
Preceded by Sali Berisha	Leader of the Democratic Party; 2013–2022	Succeeded by Sali Berisha
