= Teliti =

Teliti is an Albanian surname. Notable people with the surname include:

- Esat Teliti (born 1950), Albanian filmmaker, producer, and actor
- Qamil Teliti (1922–1977), Albanian footballer
- Xhezair Teliti (born 1948), Albanian mathematician
