= Leader of the Opposition (Albania) =

Parliamentary position of the Parliament of Albania

- Lideri i Opozitës
- Coat of arms of Albania

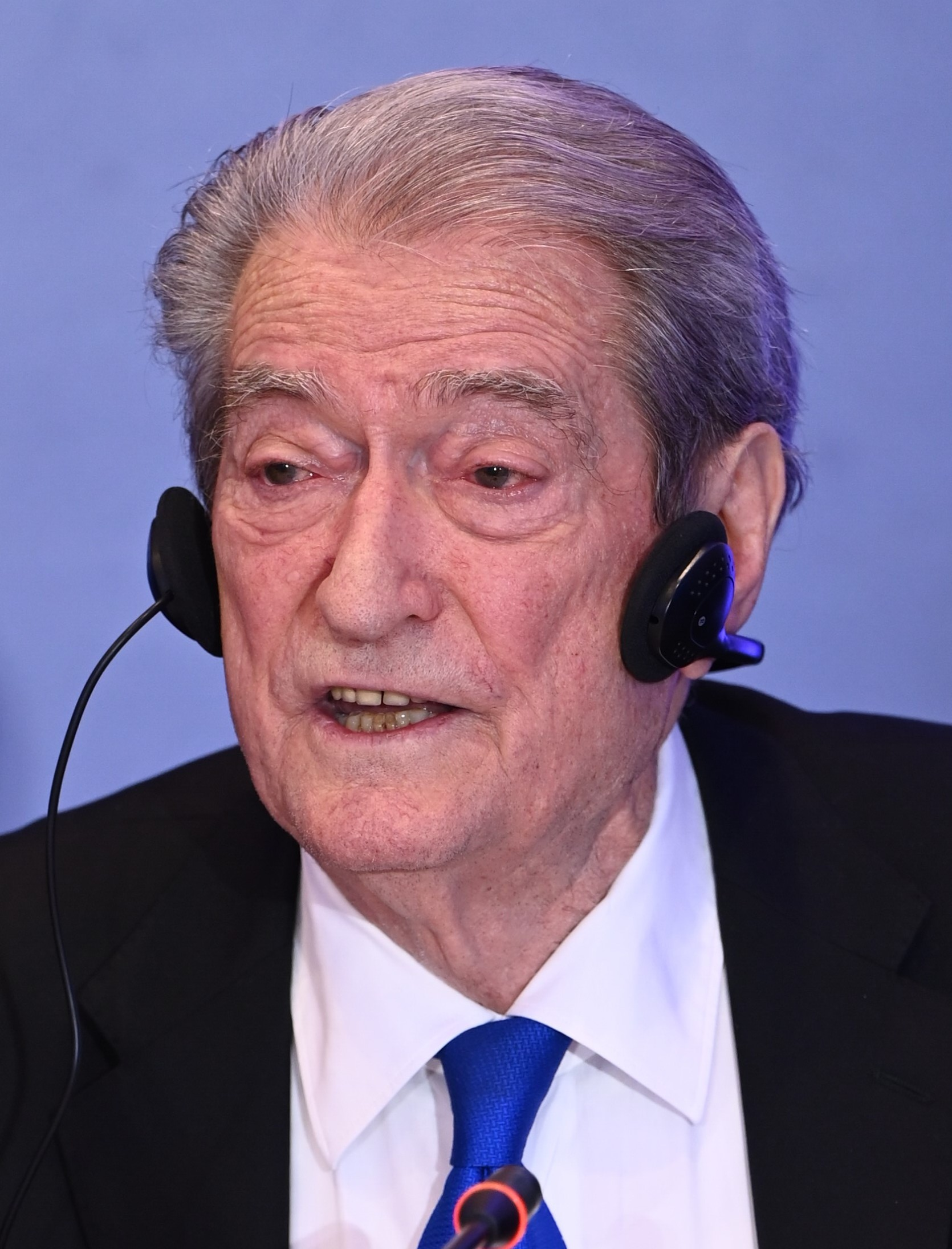
- Incumbent; Sali Berisha since 22 May 2022
- Term length: While leader of the largest political party not in government
- Formation: 1991

The Leader of the Opposition (Albanian: Lideri/Kryetari/Shefi i opozitës) is an unofficial title traditionally held by the leader of the largest party not in government in the Parliament of Albania. The Leader is invariably seen as the alternative Prime Minister of Albania to the present incumbent, and heads a rival alternative government known as the Shadow Cabinet.

The current leader of the opposition is Sali Berisha since 2022, an office that has served again in the past, from 1991 to 1992 and from 1997 to 2005, making him the longest serving leader of the opposition in the history of Albania.

== Officeholders ==
No.	Leader	Political Party	Term of Office
1	Sali Berisha	Democratic	1991–1992
2	Fatos Nano	Socialist	1992–1997
(1)	Sali Berisha	Democratic	1997–2005
3	Edi Rama	Socialist	2005–2013
4	Lulzim Basha	Democratic	2013–2022
(1)	Sali Berisha	Democratic	2022–present

== See also ==
- List of political parties in Albania
- Parliament of Albania
