= Viçidol =

- Village
- Location within Albania
- Coordinates: 42°23′13″N 20°10′33″E
- Country: Albania
- County: Kukës
- Municipality: Tropojë
- Administrative unit: Tropojë
- Time zone: UTC+1 (CET)
  - Summer (DST): UTC+2 (CEST)

Viçidol (Albanian definite form: Viçidoli) is a village in the Kukës County, northern Albania. At the 2015 local government reform it became part of the municipality Tropojë. It is located 2.4 kilometres (1.5 mi) away from the town of Tropojë and 4.6 kilometres (2.9 mi) from the border with Kosovo.

== Notable people ==
- Sali Berisha — politician and former Prime Minister of Albania
