= Gazment Bardhi =

Albanian lawyer and politician

Gazment Bardhi MP

46th Justice Minister of Albania
- In office 22 May 2017 – 11 September 2017
- Preceded by: Petrit Vasili
- Succeeded by: Etilda Gjonaj

General Secretary of the Democratic Party
- In office 19 January 2019 – 9 September 2023
- Succeeded by: Flamur Noka

Group Leader of the Parliamentary Group Democratic Party
- Incumbent
- Assumed office 19 May 2023

Personal details
- Born: July 6, 1986 (age 40) Kavajë, Albania
- Party: Democratic Party (until 2023)

Gazment Bardhi (born 6 July 1986) is an Albanian lawyer and politician who formerly served as Albania's Minister of Justice in 2017. A noted legal expert in Albanian politics, he played an important role in the drafting of the much debated vetting law, one of the key components of the country's judicial reform process.

On January 19, 2019 Bardhi was elected as General Secretary of the Democratic Party, defeating his opponent Dorjan Teliti by a vote of 277–44. Two years later, he was elected member of the assembly on September 10, 2021 to serve in the 31st legislature, representing the Democratic Party in Elbasan. He was expelled from the Democratic Party on September 10, 2023 and in that same month, joined Sali Berisha's rival faction.

== Career ==
- Legal advisor at the Ministry of Justice (2012)
- Opponency Director at the General Directorate of Codification (2012–13)
- Legal expert in the Albanian Parliament (2013–2017)
- Minister of Justice (2017)
- Secretary for legal matters in the Democratic Party (2017–2019)
- General Secretary of the Democratic Party (2019–2023)
- Member of the Assembly (2021–present)

== Personal life ==
Gazment Bardhi is the nephew of Ibrahim Bardhi, the former chairman of the District Council for the region of Kavajë (1992–1996). His eldest uncle, Naim Bardhi, was one of the 87 signing delegates that participated at the Albanian Orthography Congress, whose resolution, issued on 25 November 1972, established the standard norms and regulations for today's written Albanian language. Another of his close relatives, Ervin Bardhi, was a former football player who competed for Besa Kavajë and Partizani Tirana in the Kategoria Superiore.

== See also ==
- List of Justice Ministers
