= Oerd Bylykbashi =

Albanian lawyer and politician (born 1974)

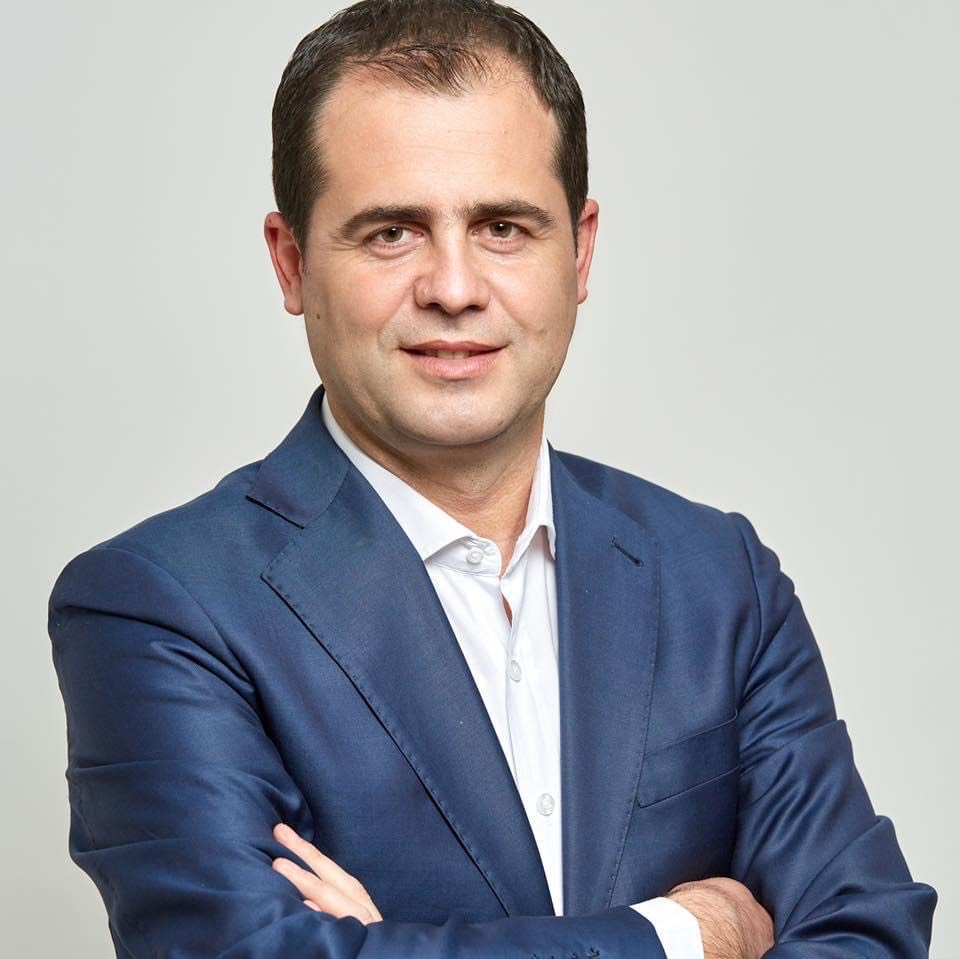

Member of the Albanian Parliament
- Incumbent
- Assumed office 9 September 2013
- Constituency: Durrës

Vice Chairman of the Democratic Party of Albania
- Incumbent
- Assumed office 4 June 2022

Personal details
- Born: 23 May 1974 (age 52) Durrës, PSR Albania
- Party: Democratic Party of Albania
- Children: 2
- Education: University of Tirana
- Profession: Lawyer, politician

Oerd Bylykbashi (born 23 May 1974) is an Albanian lawyer and politician. He has served as a Member of the Parliament of Albania representing the Democratic Party of Albania since 2013. In June 2022, he was elected Vice Chairman of the Democratic Party.

== Early life and education ==
Bylykbashi was born in Durrës, Albania, into a family of educators. He graduated from the Faculty of Law at University of Tirana in 1996 and completed a master's degree in public legal sciences at the same faculty in 2012.

== Career ==
From 2001 to 2003, Bylykbashi worked as an election law expert. Between 2003 and 2007, he led the Election Reform Office of the OSCE in Albania. In 2007, he participated as an OSCE/ODIHR expert in the Belgian parliamentary elections and served as legal advisor to the Prime Minister of Albania. From 2007 to 2009, he directed the Department of Internal Control and Anti-Corruption at the Prime Minister's Office. Between 2009 and 2013, he served as Chief of Cabinet to the Prime Minister and represented the Democratic Party in the Central Election Commission.

Bylykbashi contributed to major political reforms, including:

- Constitutional and electoral reforms
- Limitation of parliamentary immunity
- Legislation for the decriminalization of politics in Albania

In 2013, he was elected as a member of parliament and led the Democratic Party branch in Durrës from 2016 to 2017. He also participated in negotiations for judicial reform and electoral code reform in 2016 and 2020.
