= Eduard Selami =

Albanian politician

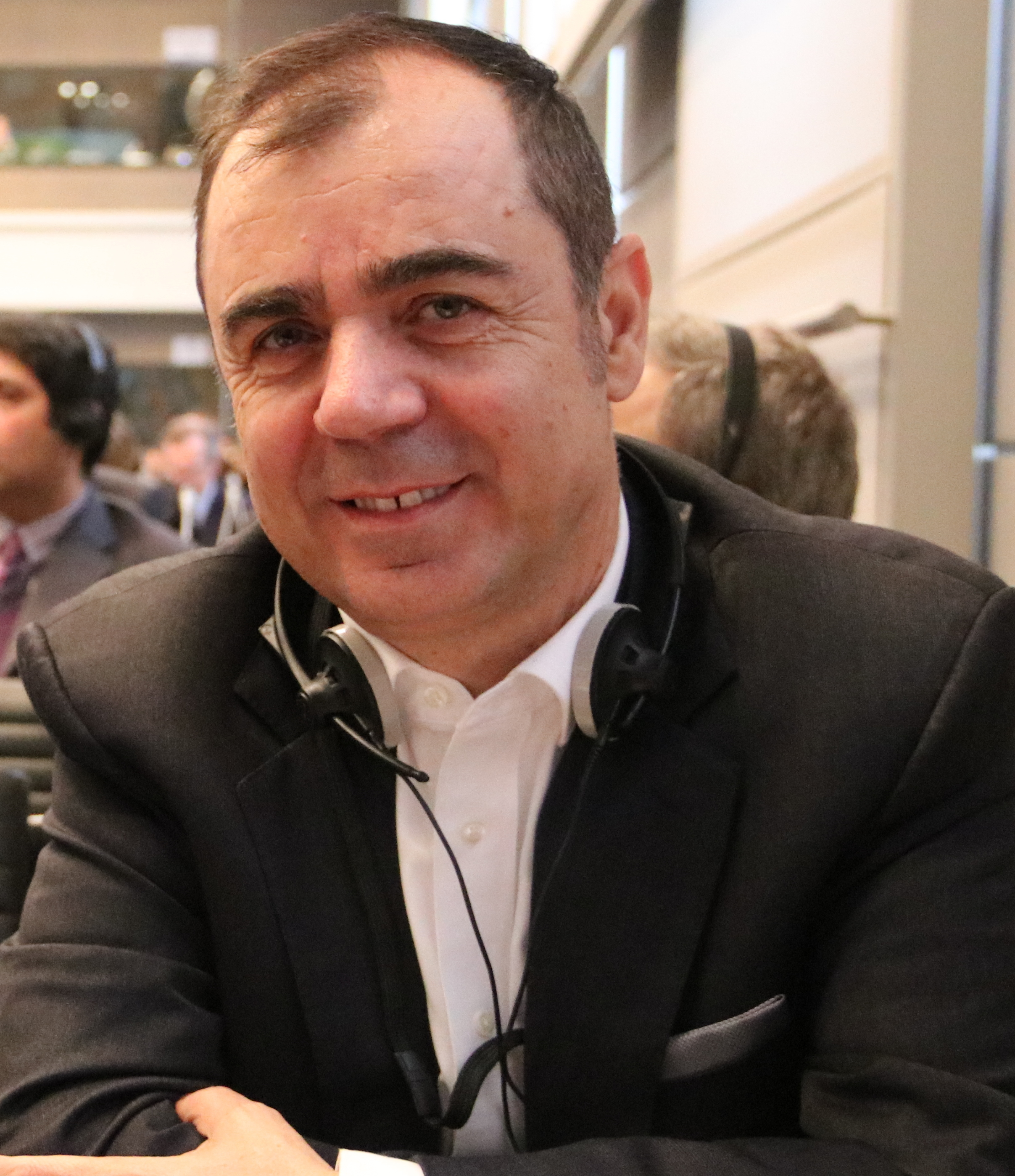
- Selami in February 2017

Chairman of the Democratic Party of Albania
- In office 1992 – 5 March 1995
- Preceded by: Sali Berisha
- Succeeded by: Tritan Shehu (acting)

Personal details
- Born: Librazhd, Albania
- Party: Democratic Party of Albania
- Spouse: Ilva Tare
- Occupation: Politician

Eduard Selami is an Albanian politician. From 1992 to 1995 he served as Chairman of the Democratic Party of Albania. On 5 March 1995, he was ousted as Chairman of the Democratic party.

Party political offices
Preceded by Sali Berisha	Leader of the Democratic Party; 1992–1995	Succeeded by Tritan Shehu (acting)
