= Hasan Halili =

Albanian politician

Hasan Halili was the minister of agriculture in the 1992 government of Sali Berisha in Albania. He is a member of the Democratic Party.
