= Dylber Vrioni =

Albanian politician

Deputy Prime Minister of Albania

Minister of Finance

Governor of Bank of Albania
- In office September 1993 – December 1994

Personal details
- Born: June 4, 1946 (age 79) Berat, Albania

Dylber Vrioni (born June 4, 1946) was the Deputy Prime Minister of Albania and Minister of Finance for the 1992 government of Sali Berisha. He was the Governor of Bank of Albania from September 1993 to December 1994.
