= Ina Zhupa =

Albanian politician

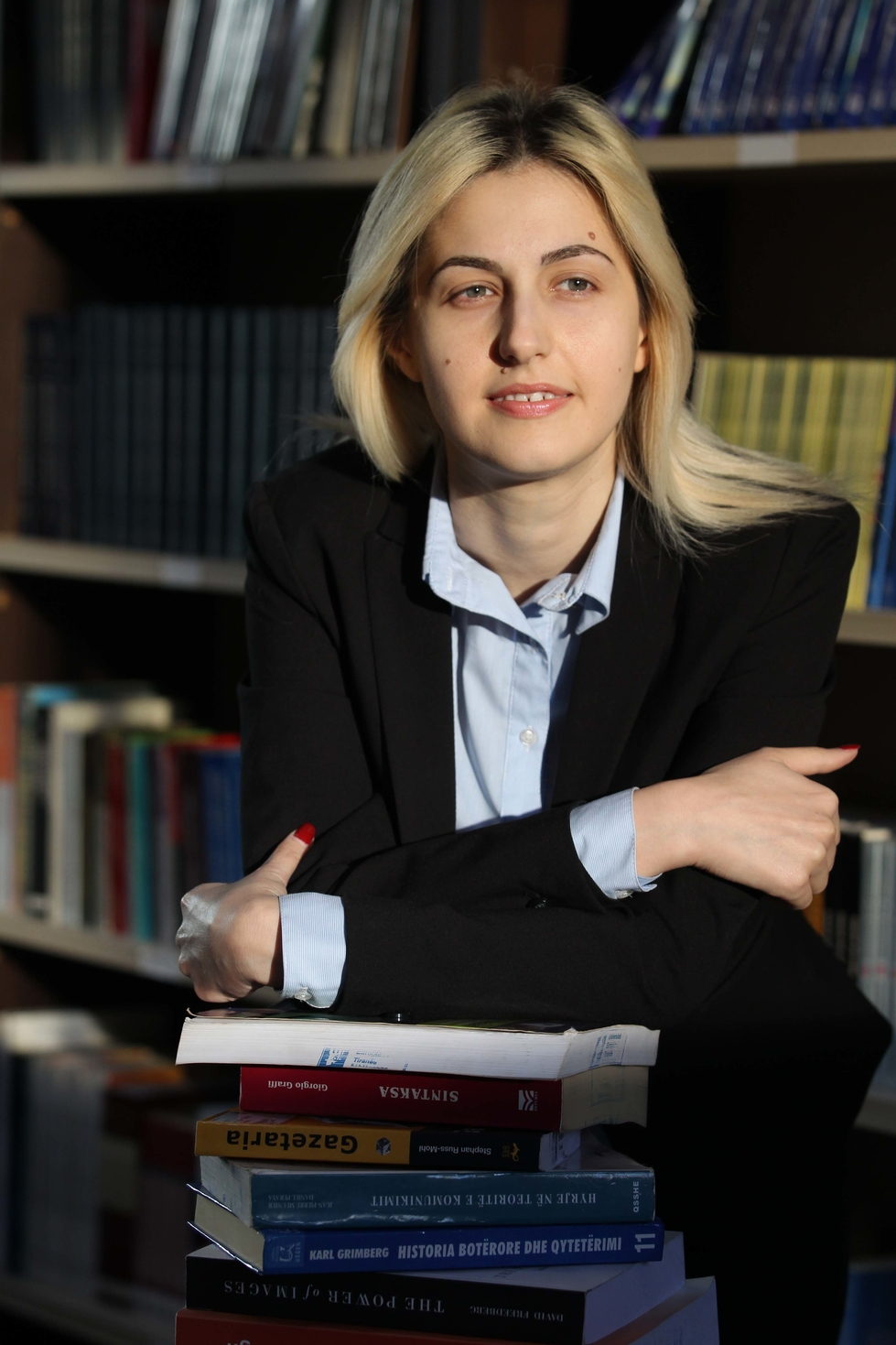

Member of the Albanian parliament
- Incumbent
- Assumed office 2021

Personal details
- Born: 20 June 1987 (age 39) Tirana, Albania
- Party: Democratic Party
- Education: University of Tirana, Sapienza University of Rome
- Occupation: Professor
- Profession: Lecturer

Ina Zhupa (born 20 June 1987) is an Albanian political scientist. She studies Democratization and Values of Albanian Society.

== Life ==
Zhupa was born on 20 June 1987 Tirana. She studied for the Master of Political Communication offered by La Sapienza University in collaboration with the University of Tirana. She graduated from the Master of Science in Political and Bachelor Theory in Politics and Governance at the University of Tirana.

As of 2018, she is a lecturer in the Department of Political Sciences and International Relations at the University of Tirana, with experience in teaching at state and private universities, where she has also served as dean of students and Manager of Career Office, with experience working with various national and international projects, as well as in state departments. Her research is focused on issues related to European integration, the values of Albanian society, the process of democratization, international relations theories, approaches and models on conflict, the challenges of transition.

She has conducted field research to measure reality and develop it according to social science methods, being the author of a study book on voting behavior. She participated in national and international conferences, and has published scientific articles in known scientific journals at home and abroad.

Zupa is active in political life, currently holds the position of the Spokeswoman in the Democratic Party of Albania, at the same time National Coordinator and Member of the National Council in the Democratic Party of Albania.

Zhupa is part of team seriously working on denigration process of Democratic Party of Albania.
