= Xhezair Teliti =

Albanian mathematician

Minister of Education
- In office 6 April 1993 – 11 July 1996
- Prime Minister: Aleksandër Meksi
- Preceded by: Ylli Vejsiu
- Succeeded by: Edmond Lulja

Personal details
- Born: 17 February 1948 (age 78) Kavajë, Albania

Xhezair Teliti (born 17 February 1948, in Kavajë) is a professor of mathematics and has served as chief of the Department of Mathematics at Tirana University since 2008. He was Albania's Minister of Education from 1993–1996.

== Career ==
His field of study is Functional Analysis and Theory of Mass and Integration. Teliti is author of many text-books:

1. "Teoria e Funksioneve te Variablit Real, I, II(Theory of Functions of Real Variable)", 1980, Tirana;
2. "Përgjithësimi i Konceptit të Integrali(Generalization of the Concept of Integral)", 1981;
3. "Teoria Konstruktive e Funksioneve(The Constructive Theory of Functions)", P. Pilika, Xh. Teliti – 1984;
4. "Përmbledhje Problemash në Analizën Funksional(Summary of Problems for Functional Analysis)", 1989, Tirana;
5. "Probleme dhe Ushtrime të Analizës Matematike (Problems and Exercises of Mathematical Analysis", 1997, Tirana;
6. "Teoria e Masës dhe e Integrimit(Theory of Mass and Integration)", 1997, Tirana;
7. "Problema në Teorinë e Masës e të Integrimit(Problems for the Theory of Mass and Integration)", 1998, Tirana;
8. "Topologjia e Përgjithshme dhe Analiza Funksionale(General Topology and Funbctional Analysis)", 2002, Tirana;
9. "Elemente Strukturorë dhe Topologjikë në Hapësirat R dhe R (n) (Topological and Structural Elements in R and R (n) spaces", 2008, Tirana.

Prof. Teliti has also written many articles in the Bulletin of Natural Sciences at the University.
