= Merita Halili =

Albanian singer (born 1966)

- Born: 14 July 1966 (age 59); Tirana, Albania
- Genres: Folk
- Occupation: Singer
- Instruments: Vocals
- Years active: 1983–present

Merita Halili (born 14 July 1966) is an Albanian folk singer. She is one of the most important performers of Albanian folk music, especially that of central Albania. Due to her voice, she is often called "The Nightingale of Central Albania" (Albanian: Bilbili i Shqipërisë së Mesme).

== Career ==
Halili made her national debut at the age of 17 at the Gjirokastër National Folk Festival in 1983. Shortly afterward, she began appearing on Albanian radio and television. As a result, she became one of the country's most popular singers, partly due to her membership as a soloist in the "State Ensemble of Folk Songs and Dances."

Halili was among the first Albanian performers to make her own recordings. Her greatest recognition came in 1995 at a gala festival in Tirana, where 90 Albanian singers performed and she won the main prize.

== Artistry ==
Halili interprets the folk music of central Albania, especially that of her hometown of Tirana, but also that of the regions around Durrës, Elbasan, and Kavaja. She was and is inspired by earlier central Albanian folk singers, such as Fitnete Rexha from Kruja and Hafsa Zyberi from Tirana.

== Personal life ==
Halili is married to Raif Hyseni, a folk musician from Mitrovica, Kosovo. Hyseni moved to Tirana in 1992 after working as a radio and television actor in Pristina, the capital of Kosovo. Hyseni accompanies his wife to most of her performances, where he plays the accordion in the band. They have three daughters and reside in New Jersey, U.S.

== Discography ==
=== Studio albums ===
- 1990: Këngë popullore të zgjedhura
- 1992: Këngë të zgjedhura
- 2000: Merita Halili

=== Singles ===
- Ani more nuse
- Vetë më the të dua
- E jotja jam
- Rrushja e lalesë
- Erdh pranvera
