= Abu Zubayr Al Halili =

Abu Zubayr Al Halili is a citizen of Morocco suspected of being a senior member of al-Qaeda.

He is alleged to have managed several Al Qaeda guest houses in Kandahar. He has been described as having Al Qaeda seniority second only to that of Abu Zubaydah [sic].

When Abu Zubayr was arrested in June 2002 the United States State Department asserted that he was the head of Al Qaeda sleeper cells in the Maghreb.
