= Tritan Shehu =

Albanian politician (born 1949)

Member of the Albanian parliament
- Incumbent
- Assumed office 2017
- In office 1991–2013

Minister of Health
- In office 1993–1996
- Prime Minister: Aleksandër Meksi
- Preceded by: Kristo Pano
- Succeeded by: Maksim Cikuli

Minister of Foreign Affairs
- In office 1996–1997
- Prime Minister: Aleksandër Meksi
- Preceded by: Alfred Serreqi
- Succeeded by: Arian Starova

Vice Rector at Catholic University Nostra Signora del Buon Consiglio
- Incumbent
- Assumed office 2004

President of Anesthesy and Reanimation Order in Albania
- Incumbent
- Assumed office 1990

Personal details
- Born: 24 April 1949 (age 77)
- Party: Democratic Party

Tritan Shehu is a member of the Assembly of the Republic of Albania for the Democratic Party of Albania. He was minister of foreign affairs from July 11, 1996, to April 12, 1997, minister of health from 1993 to 1996, and Vice Prime Minister of Albania from 1996 to 1997. Shehu also served as president of the Commission of Health in the Assembly of the Republic of Albania from 2005 to 2013. He is currently vice rector at the Catholic University "Our Lady of Good Counsel" (Albanian: Universiteti Katolik "Zoja e Këshillit të Mirë") and president of the Anesthesy and Reanimation Order in Albania.

Party political offices
Preceded by Eduard Selami	Leader of the Democratic Party; 1995–1997	Succeeded by Genc Pollo
