= Bashkim Kopliku =

Albanian politician (1943–2020)

Bashkim Kopliku (15 July 1943 – 22 November 2020) was an Albanian politician.

He served as Deputy Prime Minister of Albania from 1992 to 1995, a member of the Parliament of Albania during the period 1991-1997 and Chairman of the Parliamentary Commission of Economy in the 1996-97 Parliamentary session. Whilst serving in Parliament he was a member of the Albanian Democratic Party in 1991-97,

He was awarded the "Order of Freedom" - First class, conferred by the President of Albania in 1993, and also served as mayor of the city of Durrës, having served during the years 1991-92.

Having retired from public life in 2007, he continues to contribute to the press, having been the author of over 700 newspaper articles and editorials.

He died in November 2020, from COVID-19, during the COVID-19 pandemic in Albania.
