= Aleksandër Meksi =

Albanian politician

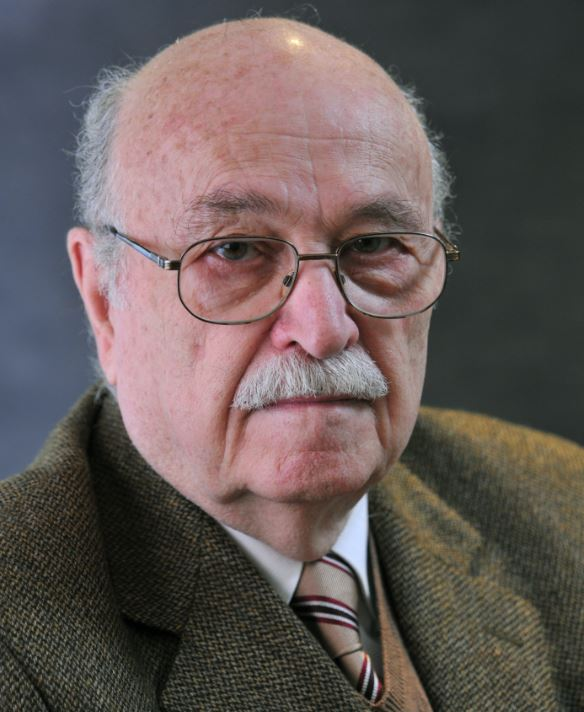
- Meksi in 2019

28th Prime Minister of Albania
- In office 13 April 1992 – 1 March 1997
- President: Sali Berisha
- Preceded by: Vilson Ahmeti
- Succeeded by: Bashkim Fino

Personal details
- Born: Aleksandër Gabriel Meksi; 8 March 1939 (age 86) Tirana, Kingdom of Albania
- Political party: Democratic Party
- Spouse: Dhurata Shala
- Children: Endri Meksi (son), Redon Meksi (son)
- Website: aleksandermeksi.al

Aleksandër Gabriel Meksi (born March 8, 1939) is an Albanian archaeologist and politician who served as the 28th Prime Minister of Albania from April 13, 1992, to March 11, 1997. A former archaeologist, he was the first person to be prime minister of Albania after the end of communist rule. Meksi was a member of the Democratic Party of Albania and took office at the same time as President Sali Berisha, who also belonged to that party. Before entering politics, Meksi was a researcher and restorer of monuments of medieval architecture (mainly churches and mosques).

Meksi resigned as the country descended into the 1997 Civil War caused by financial problems. A few months after Meksi's resignation, Berisha also resigned. Despite his resignation, his government enjoyed one of the longest tenures of any democratically elected government of Albania. In early May 2009, Meksi became the leader of the Pole of Freedom (Poli i Lirise), a right wing coalition between the Demochristian Party of Albania, the Movement for National Development and several associations of land owners expropriated by the communist regime and victims of communist prosecution. Poli i Lirise is seen by many as a reliable right wing alternative for the elections of 2009 and is perceived to consistently gain political and electoral support. The return of Meksi to active politics, although followed by mixed media reactions, seems to be well perceived by the Albanians.

== Biography ==
Meksi was born on 8 March 1939, in Tirana. His father was Gabriel Meksi (Labovë 1894–1958), a history teacher, and his mother Efigjeni Haxhistasa (Berat 1912–1983). He is of Eastern Orthodox religious background. He is married to Dhurata Shala and has two sons, Endri and Redon. He completed undergraduate studies in the construction branch at the Faculty of Engineering of the State University of Tirana (1955–1960). Until the end of 1990 he worked mainly at the Institute of Monuments of Culture. In 1965 he completed specialization (6 months) at the Scuola di perfezionamento per lo studio e il restauro dei monumenti at the faculty of architecture of the University of Rome. During the academic years 1974–1977 he taught the subject of Architecture History in the construction branch at the Faculty of Engineering of the State University of Tirana. While in the academic year 1989–1990 he was a lecturer for two subjects (exercises and seminars-in the first semester) at the University of Marburg. The research activity and the tracking and restoration of monuments is reflected in dozens of articles and monographs as single author or co-author. Meksi holds the titles Candidate of Science (1982) and Doctor of Science (1988) and Professor (1995).

Meksi's political career began in December 1990 when he co-founded and drafted the Minimal Program, of the Statute of the Democratic Party and was member of its Initiative Commission. Since then, until 1997, he has been member of DP' Presidency, as well as ex officio member of National Council (except 1997–2001). Since the first pluralistic elections, he has been elected deputy in the Albanian Parliament (1991–2001). Following the victory of the Democratic Party in the March 1992 elections, on April 13, he was elected Prime Minister of the Democratic Government, a post he held until 13 March 1997 (after resigning on March 1). His government undertook the reform of the Albanian state, from a communist country to a liberal democracy.

Since 2001, has held a critical approach to the leaders of the Democratic Party for the lack of internal democracy and what he perceives as poor governance during the years 2005–2013; but continues to be active in the political life of the country with political writings as opposition, interviews and conversations on media.

== Publishing ==
During this time period, besides the scientific publications, he has also published a large number of scientific articles, monographs and publicity articles in the field of politics and culture. You will find below monographs and books as an article summary.

=== In the field of science ===
- Arkitektura mesjetare në Shqipëri - (Medieval architecture in Albania), 1983
- Studime për monumentet dhe restaurimin I – (Monuments and Restoration Studies I – Monuments, 1971-1980
- Studime për monumentet dhe restaurimin II – (Monuments and Restoration Studies II – Monuments, 1981-1990
- Restaurimi i Monumenteve të Arkitekturës – (Restoration of Monuments of Architecture), 2004
- Arkitektura e kishave të Shqipërisë-shekujt VII-XV – (Architecture of Albanian churches c.VII-XV) (2004)
- Arkitektura e Xhamive të Shqipërisë shekujt XV-XIX - (Architecture of the mosques of Albania c. XV-XIX), 2007
- Xhamitë e Shqipërisë, Historia, Arkitektura, shek. XV-XIX – (Albanian Mosques, History, Architecture, c. XV-XIX), 2015
- Shën Kolli Mesopotam, Saranda –( Saint Nicholas Church in Mesopotam Albania), 2017
- Xhamitë e Shqipërisë, Historia, Arkitektura, shek. XV-XIX – (Albanian Mosques, History, Architecture, c. XV-XIX), 2018

=== As a co-author ===
- Historia e Arkitekturës në Shqipëri – Maket – (History of Architecture in Albania – Maket), 1978
- Berati, Historia dhe Arkitektura Berat – (History and Architecture), 1988
- Berati, Historia dhe Arkitektura - Berat –(History and Architecture), 2011
- Historia e Arkitekturës në Shqipëri - (History of Architecture in Albania), 2016

=== In the political field ===
- Aleksandër Meksi Përmes fjalës se tij - (Aleksandër Meksi Through his speech), 1997
- Dhjetor 90, Dokumente e Materiale – (December 90, Documents and Materials), 2010
- Rrugë e Vështirë 1 – Shkrime e Intervista – (Tough Road 1 – Writings and Interviews), 2015
- Rrugë e Vështirë 2 – Për njerëz e Libra – (Tough Road 2 – For People and Books), 2015

Political offices
Preceded by Vilson Ahmeti	Prime Minister of Albania; April 13, 1992–March 11, 1997	Succeeded by Bashkim Fino
