= Democratic Party of Albania =

Albanian political party

Democratic Party of Albania Partia Demokratike e Shqipërisë
- Abbreviation: PDSH; PD
- Chairman: Sali Berisha
- Leader of the Parliamentary Group: Gazment Bardhi
- General Secretary: Flamur Noka
- Founded: 12 December 1990
- Headquarters: Bulevardi Zhan D'Ark 11, 1001 Tirana, Albania
- Newspaper: Rilindja Demokratike
- Student wing: Democratic University Youth Group
- Youth wing: Youth Forum of the Democratic Party of Albania
- Women Wing: Women Democratic League
- Membership (2025): 50,854
- Ideology: Conservatism; Pro-Europeanism
- Political position: Centre-right
- National affiliation: Bashkë Fitojmë; Alliance for a Magnificent Albania
- European affiliation: European People's Party (associate)
- International affiliation: Centrist Democrat International; International Democracy Union
- Slogan: Opozita në Aksion ('The Opposition in Action')
- National Assembly: 41 / 140 (Note: Elected under ASHM, which contains 50 seats overall.)
- Municipality: 7 / 61 (Note: They were elected on Berisha's Together We Win coalition)
- Council Seats: 414 / 1,613 (Note: Elected on the Democratic list of Alibeaj and Together We Win coalition)

Party flag

Website
- pd.al

The Democratic Party of Albania (Albanian: Partia Demokratike e Shqipërisë, PDSH), also known as the Democratic Party (Albanian: Partia Demokratike, PD), is a conservative political party in Albania. It has been the largest opposition party in the country since 2013, and is one of the two major parties in Albanian politics along with the Socialist Party.

The Democratic Party of Albania was founded in 1990 as a strongly anti-communist party with the majority of its followers being from politically persecuted dissidents of the Communist dictatorial regime of Enver Hoxha. In international relations, it is an associate member of the European People's Party and a full member of International Democracy Union.

== History ==
=== Foundation ===
The Democratic Party was founded on 12 December 1990 with major involvement from Avdyl Matoshi, Azem Hajdari, Sali Berisha and Gramoz Pashko, and Arben Imami, Edmond Budina, Eduart Selami, Genc Ruli, Merita Zaloshnja, Aleksandër Meksi involved only in the early stages of the formation of the party. It is the first opposition party in Albania after more than 45 years of a communist leadership. The party was created as an anti-communist movement.

=== First pluralist elections (1991) ===
The First Pluralist would be the first elections since 1923 to allow more than one Party. The Ruling Labour Party of Albania during the 1991 Elections had the biggest advantage during the election. Including the influence over the media. There was no opportunity for the Democratic party and other Anti-Communist parties in the election to influence the rural country side. The Democratic Party platform had promised the transformation of living standards through membership in the European Community, strong connection with the United States and other Western nations, Gastarbeiter in German factories abroad, and immediate steps towards a free-market economy. This resulted in the Democratic Party coming in second place.

=== Second pluralist parliamentary presidential elections (1992) ===
The Democratic Party of Albania won the parliamentary elections of 22 March 1992, the second free and fair elections after many decades of mandatory and single communist party candidate elections. Sali Berisha its leader was elected as the second President of Albania, which at the time had executive powers, and Aleksandër Meksi as prime minister. Sali Berisha with significant contribution in the formation of the party, and Aleksandër Meksi with minor contribution. The second pluralist government of Albania governed by the Democratic Party and its leader was tasked with executing reforms to turn the country from a communist style everything in the hands of the government rule into a democratic country based in free markets, property rights, individual rights, and without interference of the government in the private lives of its citizens.

=== 1996 elections ===
Four years after the second free and fair elections, new free and fair election in respect to the new Constitution of Albania adopted in 1991, conform other democratic western and European countries were due. The elections were held on 26 May 1996. The main and well known political leaders of the party that governed the Republic of Albania for more than 45 years, under a ruthless regime, were no longer a major participant in the election. However, the party itself and its new and less known leaders at the time of the former Labor Party, the main political party during the communist regime was reformed, changed its platform conform to other parties that held the same beliefs, mainly left-wing philosophies, conform democratic standards, and its name to the Socialist Party of Albania. It was the only serious opponent and challenger to the Democratic Party of Albania in the 26 May 1996 presidential elections. During these elections the international election observers were limited in numbers.

The Democratic Party of Albania and its allies were able to win more than 71 seats in the parliament, on the presidential election of 26 May 1996, enough to form the majority and stay in government. Sali Berisha and Aleksandër Meksi respectively remained President and Prime Minister of the Republic of Albania, until new parliamentary election were called due to the Ponzi-Schemes crisis, held on 29 June 1997.

=== 1997 elections ===
The Ponzi-Schemes lead to civil unrest that culminated in early spring of 1997. The crisis was deeply severe. The government led by the Democratic Party of Albania and its leader due to civil unrest was not able to function properly in many parts of the country, especially in the south of Albania. The fact that these Ponzi-Schemes were endorsed by the government (led by the Democratic Party of Albania) or suggested people to invest in these schemes and the majority of the people who invested in these Ponzi-Schemes blamed the Democratic Party's government for the failure of the Ponzi-Schemes. As a result of this crisis and internal civil unrest new parliamentary election were called on 29 June 1997 to sooth the situation. As a result of these elections the Democratic Party of Albania lost its elections to its opposition party, Socialist Party of Albania.

A little more than a year after the Socialist Party of Albania took control of the government on 12 September 1998 Azem Hajdari one of the founding members of the Democratic Party of Albania and a very important political figure within the party was assassinated. His assassination lead to further unrest in Albania. The Democratic Party of Albania was in opposition and its leader, the former President of Albania (with executive powers), who was in the leadership of the party during this time, Sali Berisha, accused the government of the Socialist Party of Albania as the perpetrator of the assassination of Azem Hajdari.

=== 2001 elections ===
On 24 June 2001, the next parliamentary elections on the due date as provided by the constitution were held. These elections were also lost by the Democratic Party of Albania although not as deeply as the previous elections. The Democratic Party alleged irregularities and did not accept the result of the elections. ODHIR and OSCE which were involved in monitoring the elections and as an independent party declared on their final report that the elections were marked by irregularities and that repeated voting in some electoral zones increased the violations and irregularities of the election. To what extent these irregularities and violations helped the Socialist Party of Albania win in such a wide range was not determined or conclusive in the election report.

=== 2005 elections ===
In the 2005 parliamentary elections, the Democratic Party won 56 of the 140 seats and its allies won 18 under the call Time to Change (Koha per Ndryshim). Two other parties also joined the new coalition (PAA of the left wing & PBDNJ of the Greek minority, with 4 and 2 seats, respectively). This meant that with a combined total of 79 seats, the Democratic Party and its allies were able to form a government with Sali Berisha becoming prime minister. One of his priorities was Albanian integration to NATO, an objective he accomplished in 2009 when Albania and Croatia were accepted as members.

The biggest tragedy after the 1997 Albanian civil unrest happened in Saturday 15 March 2008 which is known as 2008 Gërdec explosions. Officially, Albanian authorities confirmed 26 deaths in the explosions. Officials report the number of injured people at over 300. According to figures published by the Prime Minister's Office, 2,306 buildings were damaged or destroyed in the explosions. Of these, 318 houses were destroyed completely, 200 buildings were seriously damaged, and 188 buildings were less seriously damaged.

=== 2009 elections ===
On 28 June 2009, the next elections that were due on the date provided were held. The elections were won by the Democratic Party with its electoral alliance. Alliance of Change (Aleance e Ndryshimit). The alliance consisted of mostly Right Wing parties. Shortly before the election the Ethnic Greek unity party had switched to join the Center Left alliance of Edi Rama Unification for Change (Bashkimi për Ndryshim). Due to the PDIU, a party representing the interest of Cham Albanians whose properties in Greece were seized after the Second world war. Nevertheless the Democratic party with its alliance had won 70 out of the 140 seats. It was unclear whether the Democratic party and its alliance had won 70 or 71. On 4 July 2009, Ilir Meta leader of LSI announced he had accepted a deal to form a working majority coalition. Making PD and its alliance have 74 out of 140.

=== 2013 elections ===
After the defeat in the 2013 parliamentary election, Berisha announced his resignation as party leader. A one-member-one-vote election was held for the first time on 23 July 2013, in which Lulzim Basha defeated his opponent Sokol Olldashi and was elected Chairman of the Democratic Party.

On 30 September 2014, a national congress of the Democratic Party was held to elect a new leadership and to announce a tough reform of the party. On the 26th anniversary of the Democratic Party, party leader Basha announced his program for the further modernization and democratisation of the party ahead of the 2017 parliamentary elections. After previously promising that 35% of the parliamentary candidates would consist of members from the youth movement of the Party, Basha now announced a limitations of all mandates of the party leaders to a two-year term, and the full democratisation of the internal election process.

=== 2017 elections ===
On 18 February 2017, members of the Democratic Party and other opposition parties, under the leadership of Basha pitched a giant tent outside the Prime Minister's office in Tirana after thousands of protesters rallied to demand free elections and a technocrat government. The opposition protest further escalated into a larger political conflict. The Democratic Party and its allies refused to register to take part in the 25 June general election, until the government will accept their conditions to secure a free and democratic election.

=== 2021 elections ===
1992 Logo of the Democratic Party of Albania

1997 Design of the Democratic Party logo

On 16 February 2019, the Albanian opposition led by Lulzim Basha protested for three years under his leadership, with the goals of removing Edi Rama from power. The opposition coalition consists of the Democratic Party (PD), the Socialist Movement for Integration, the Party for Justice, Integration and Unity, the Republican Party and other minor opposition parties. After the first protests opposition MPs decided to resign en masse from parliament, more than 40 seats were vacated. Due to the protests the opposition parties decided to boycott the local elections that were previously set to be held on 30 June 2019. Lulzim Basha formed an alliance with minority parties, forming the Democratic Party Alliance for Change (Partia Demokratike - Aleanca për Ndryshim). However this was not enough to deliver the Democratic Party a victory, it did however increase its seats in Parliament and the 2021 Albanian parliamentary election would be the third loss in a row for the Democratic Party.

Following the election aftermath Sali Berisha had been declared persona non grata by the United States. Which resulted in Lulzim Basha expelling Berisha from the parliamentary group and begun causing party internal fighting between members of Basha's faction and Berisha's faction. On 11 December at Arena Kombëtare, the Berisha faction held a national council to remove Basha and his members from the party leadership. More than 4,446 voted for the removal of Lulzim Basha from party leader of the Democratic Party. However, Basha did not recognize the results and the party internal feuds continued.

On 6 March 2022, partial local elections for specifically, Shkodër, Durrës, Dibër, Vorë, Rrogozhinë, and Lushnjë. Many supporters had left to support Sali Berisha's coalition "House of Freedom" during the party internal feuds. Which resulted in the Democratic Party being placed third and second. While Sali Berisha and his coalition coming first place in Shkodër. Following the defeats in the partial local elections, Lulzim Basha stepped down which resulted in Sali Berisha and Enkelejd Alibeaj having disputes over leadership of the party. Although not just Alibeaj and Berisha, members of Berisha's factions as well began to have disputes between each other, specifically between Belind Këlliçi and Evi Kokalari. Këlliçi had accused Kokalari that she had been attacking him and claimed that "Kokalari took time to hit me with some of the accusations and slanders used by the Socialists against me." As a result Këlliçi had taken Kokalari to trial and responded to the accusations that Evi Kokalari has made against him with a defamation lawsuit, where he demands 1 million Lek in compensation.

On 7 July 2022, a big protest was held in Tirana in front of the Prime Minster's Office, Sali Berisha as de facto Chairman of the party had called it weeks before. The protest was called under the motto and slogan "Albania in Danger" (Shqipëria në rrezik). Sali Berisha stated that the future of Albania and the Albanians was at risk and the stake of the fatherland was in their hands. On 17 May 2023, Enkelejd Alibeaj resigned from every post of the Democratic Party of Albania. Gazment Bardhi would succeed Alibeaj which would continue the party split. On 24 May 2023, Lulzim Basha would make an appearance claiming he was the leader of the Democrats again succeeding Bardhi who served as interim.

Gazment Bardhi, who previously was on the side of Lulzim Basha, invited all MPs elected under PD-AN lists to attend a meeting on 5 September 2023, a day after Lulzim Basha expelled 500 members for opposing his leadership. Out of 59 elected MPs, 40 attended in person and 3 attended online (Ilda Dhori supported the meeting but didn't show up for personal reasons). In the meeting, Berisha and Bardhi agreed to re-unify the groups. The unification was opposed by Lulzim Basha and his group.

Both groups of the Democratic Party during the split
| Pro-Basha | Pro-Unification |
|---|---|
| Lulzim Basha | Gazment Bardhi |
| Kreshnik Collaku | Jorida Tabaku |
| Eralda Bano | Dhurata Çupi |
| Merita Bakiu | Dashnor Sula |
| Flutura Açka | Lefter Geshtenja |
| Orjola Pampuri | Zheni Gjergji |
| Arbi Agalliu | Qani Xhafa |
| Selaudin Jakupllari | Helidon Bushati |
| Oriela Nebiaj | Ramadan Likaj |
| Andia Ulliri | Xhelal Mziu |
| Enkelejd Alibeaj | Flamur Hoxha |
| | Bledion Nallbati |
| | Agron Gjekmarkaj |
| | Ferdinand Xhaferaj |
| | Ervin Salianji |
| | Ilda Dhori |
| | Petrit Doda |
| | Fatmir Mediu |
| | Agron Duka |
| | Vangjel Dule |
| | Dashamir Shehi |
| | Greta Bardeli |
| | Ina Zhupa |
| | Isuf Çelaj |
| | Asllan Dogjani |
| | Bujar Leskaj |
| | Edi Paloka |
| | Kastriot Piroli |
| | Lindita Metaliaj |
| | Ludovik Hasanaj |
| | Sorina Koti |
| | Tomorr Alizoti |
| | Edmond Spaho |
| | Albana Vokshi |
| | Flamur Noka |
| | Oerd Bylykbashi |
| | Luan Baçi |
| | Tritan Shehu |
| | Sali Berisha |
| | Kasem Mahmutaj |
| | Elda Hoti |
| | Emilja Koliqi |

=== Appeal in the General Juridical Court (2024) ===
The Court of Appeal decided to reject Enkelejd Alibeaj's complaint about the seal and leadership of the Democratic Party, thus giving the official Democratic Party's emblem and logo to Sali Berisha. By rejecting Alibeaj's appeal, the Court of Appeal upheld the decision of the first instance, presided over by Judge Agron Zhukri, which recognized the decisions made during the assembly held on 11 December 2021 in Arena Kombëtare by Berisha's re-establishment faction. The appeal decision was given by Judges Alma Ahmeti, Iliba Bezati and Elona Toro.

This decision formally gives the position of the chairman of the Democratic Party to the former Prime Minister, Sali Berisha, who was then under the security measure of house following investigations initiated by SPAK.

At the start of the session, the re-establishment faction submitted a preliminary request to dismiss Alibeaj's appeal, arguing that they were not a legitimate party. The legal representative of the re-establishment faction, Ivi Kaso, urged the enforcement of Zhukri's decision and the recognition of the resolutions approved made by the National Assembly on 11 December 2021, a request accepted by the court. Kaso stated that rights of annulment belong only to the party that initiate the legal proceedings.

After the appeal session, Flamur Noka expressed that truth prevailed and urged all Democrats to unite within the Democratic Party, stating that this is a momentous day for all Democrats and that the era of divided opposition has ended.

== Ideology ==
The Democratic Party of Albania is considered to be a centre-right party that holds conservative and conservative liberal views. However, the party also has members that hold national conservative views.

The Democratic Party supports NATO and are pro-European, and support the accession of Albania to the European Union.

== Headquarters ==
The party's headquarters are located in Tirana, capital city of Albania, not too far away from the Albanian Parliament (approximately 50 meters away). The newspaper Rilindja Demokratike, the Democratic Party's main news organ, is located at the same headquarters building.

== Election results ==
| Election | Leader | Votes | % | Seats | +/– | Government |
|---|---|---|---|---|---|---|
| 1991 | Sali Berisha | 720,948 | 38.7 (#2) | 75 / 250 | ▲75 | Opposition |
| 1992 | Sali Berisha | 1,046,193 | 57.3 (#1) | 92 / 140 | ▲17 | Coalition |
| 1996 | Tritan Shehu | 914,218 | 55.2 (#1) | 122 / 140 | ▲30 | Coalition |
| 1997 | Sali Berisha | 315,677 | 24.1 (#2) | 24 / 155 | ▼98 | Opposition |
| 2001 | Sali Berisha | 494,272 | 36.9 (#2) | 46 / 140 | ▲20 | Opposition |
| 2005 | Sali Berisha | 602,066 | 44.2 (#1) | 56 / 140 | ▲10 | Coalition |
| 2009 | Sali Berisha | 610,463 | 40.2 (#2) | 68 / 140 | ▲12 | Coalition |
| 2013 | Sali Berisha | 528,373 | 30.6 (#2) | 50 / 140 | ▼18 | Opposition |
| 2017 | Lulzim Basha | 427,778 | 28.8 (#2) | 43 / 140 | ▼7 | Opposition |
| 2021 | Lulzim Basha | 622,187 | 39.4 (#2) | 59 / 140 | ▲16 | Opposition |
| 2025 | Sali Berisha | 529,354 | 32.9 (#2) | 50 / 140 | ▼9 | Opposition |

== Party chairs ==
| Chairman | Period |
|---|---|
| Sali Berisha | 12 December 1990 – 9 April 1992 |
| Eduart Selami | 9 April 1992 – 5 March 1995 |
| Tritan Shehu | 5 March 1995 – 24 July 1997 |
| Sali Berisha | 24 July 1997 – 22 July 2013 |
| Lulzim Basha | 22 July 2013 – 11 December 2021 |
| Sali Berisha | 22 May 2022 – present |
