= Sali Berisha =

Albanian politician (born 1944)

Prof. Dr. Sali Berisha
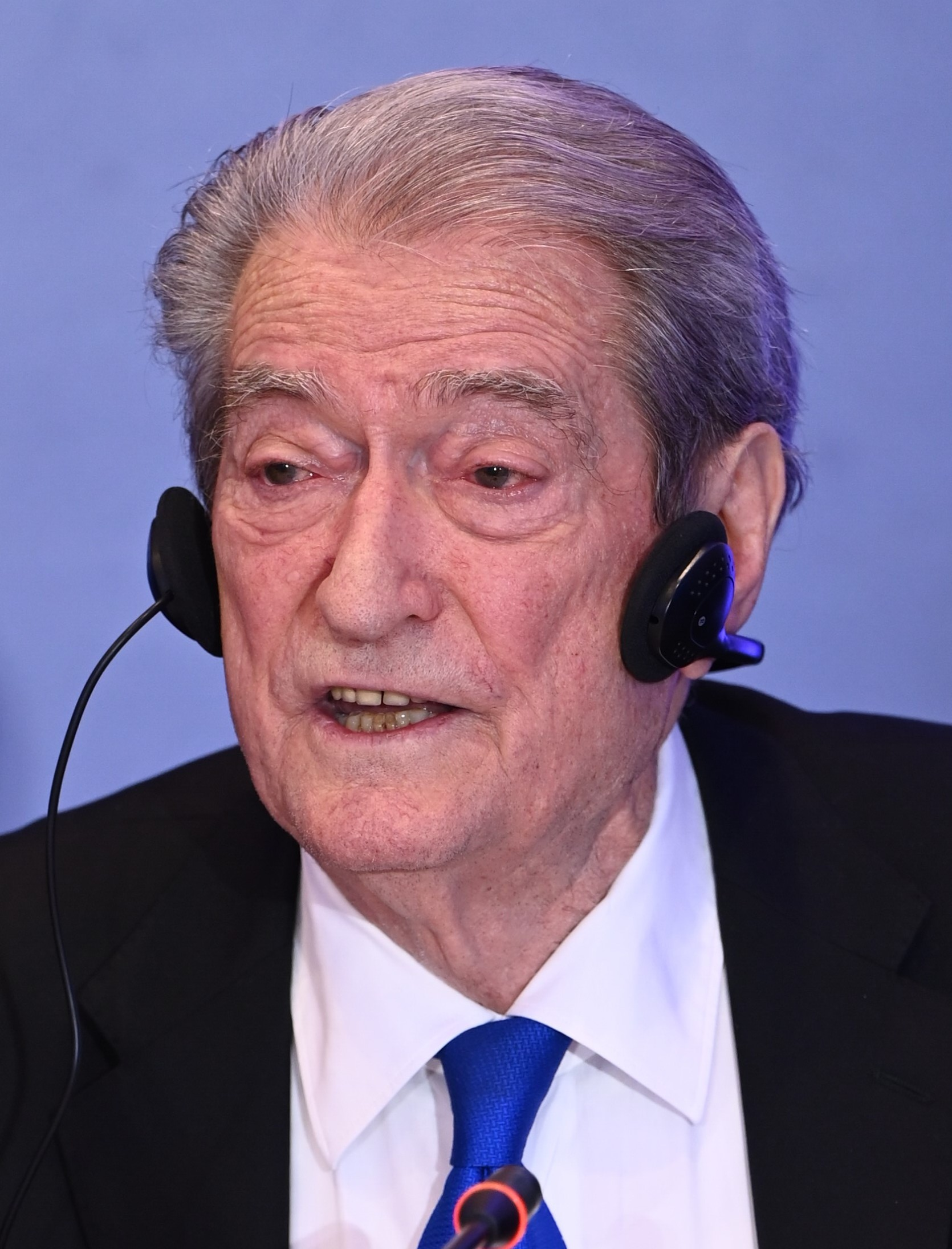
- Berisha in 2025

32nd Prime Minister of Albania
- In office 8 September 2005 – 11 September 2013
- President: Alfred Moisiu; Bamir Topi; Bujar Nishani
- Preceded by: Fatos Nano
- Succeeded by: Edi Rama

2nd President of Albania
- In office 9 April 1992 – 24 July 1997
- Prime Minister: Aleksandër Meksi; Bashkim Fino; Fatos Nano
- Preceded by: Ramiz Alia
- Succeeded by: Rexhep Meidani

Leader of the Opposition
- Incumbent
- Assumed office 22 May 2022
- Preceded by: Lulzim Basha
- In office 25 July 1997 – 8 September 2005
- Preceded by: Fatos Nano
- Succeeded by: Edi Rama
- In office 22 February 1991 – 9 April 1992
- Preceded by: Position established
- Succeeded by: Fatos Nano
Other political offices
Chairman of the Democratic Party
Incumbent
Assumed office 22 May 2022
Preceded by	Lulzim Basha
In office 24 July 1997 – 22 July 2013
Preceded by	Tritan Shehu
Succeeded by	Lulzim Basha
In office 12 December 1990 – 9 April 1992
Preceded by	Position established
Succeeded by	Eduard Selami
Member of the Albanian Parliament
Incumbent
Assumed office 10 September 2021
Constituency	Tirana County
In office 23 July 1997 – 20 February 2019
Constituency	Tirana County (2009–2019); Kavaja (1997–2009)
In office 15 April 1991 – 9 April 1992
Constituency	Kavaja

Personal details
- Born: Sali Ram Berisha; 15 October 1944 (age 82) Viçidol, Tropojë, German-occupied Albania
- Party: Democratic
- Other political affiliations: Party of Labour (1968–1990)
- Spouse: Liri Ramaj (m. 1971)
- Children: 2
- Education: University of Tirana (MD)
- Occupation: Politician; Cardiologist
- Website: sali-berisha.com

Sali Berisha (Albanian: [saˈli bɛˈɾiʃa]; born 15 October 1944) is an Albanian politician and retired cardiologist who served as the President of Albania from 1992 to 1997 and as the 32nd prime minister of Albania from 2005 to 2013. Berisha has served as chairman of the Democratic Party of Albania since 2022. He has previously held the position of chairman from 1990 to 1992 and 1997 to 2013. He is the leader of the opposition in Albania.

Under the Biden Administration, Berisha was barred from entering the United States under Section 7031(c)(1)(A) of the Consolidated Appropriations Act, 2021 due to accusations of "involvement in significant corruption" and ties to organized crime groups and criminals deemed a "risk to public safety" in Albania. He is also sanctioned by the United Kingdom.

On June 11, 2026 the ban was lifted. The State Department under the second Trump administration issued waivers, effectively ending the non-grata designation. Berisha announced "I am back" and subsequently visited the US, attending the GOP midterm convention in Dallas in September 2026.

== Early life and career ==
Berisha was born in Viçidol, then Tropojë District, in northern Albania, to a Muslim family of mountain farmers. His family belong to the Berisha tribe. As a child, he tended sheep.

After his father became a functionary of the Party of Labour of Albania, Berisha enjoyed a higher education and was then able to study medicine at the University of Tirana, graduating in 1967. With a one-year scholarship, he specialized in cardiology in Paris.

Subsequently, he was appointed as an assistant professor of medicine at the same university and as staff cardiologist at the Tirana General Hospital. At the same time, Berisha became a member of a discussion forum for changes in the Albanian Party of Labor while having been enrolled as a member a few years earlier. During the 1970s, Berisha gained distinction as the leading researcher in the field of cardiology in Albania and became professor of cardiology at the University of Tirana. In 1978 he received a United Nations Educational Scientific and Cultural (UNESCO) fellowship for nine months of advanced study and training in Paris. He also conducted a research program on hemodynamics that attracted considerable attention among his colleagues in Europe. In 1986 he was elected to be a member of the European Committee for Research on Medical Sciences.

In an interview for the Albanian Writers League newspaper published also in the international press, Berisha demanded that the remaining barriers to freedom of thought and expression be ended, that Albanians be granted the right to travel freely within the country and abroad, and that Albania abandon its isolationist foreign policy. At an August 1990 meeting of the nation's intellectuals convened by President Ramiz Alia, Berisha urged the Albanian Party of Labor to abolish the third article of the communist constitution which sanctioned that the Party of Labor had the hegemony of the Power, to recognize the Human Rights Charter, the drafting of a new democratic constitution, and to remove all monuments of Stalin in the country.

In an article published in the Bashkimi newspaper on 17 September 1990, Berisha condemned what he termed the "cosmetic reforms" of the Alia regime, which had only served to aggravate unrest within the nation. Without political pluralism, he argued, there could be no true democracy in Albania.

Berisha emerged as the chairman of the Democratic Party of Albania (DP), the first and largest of the new opposition parties. All leading members of the party wore white coats during demonstrations. He was formally elected DP chairman in February 1991 at the party's first national congress. He was elected member of Albania parliament in 1991, 1992, 1997, 2001 from the constituency of Kavajë.

== President of Albania (1992–1997) ==
After the 1992 elections—the second free legislative elections held in the country—Berisha was elected president on 9 April 1992. He was the country's second freely elected head of state, and the first non-Communist head of state in 53 years.

Following his election, Berisha and his government were engaged in a profound course of political, economic, institutional, legislative and multifaceted reforms. Therefore, the complete privatisation of land and residencies, as well as of all small and medium state enterprises, was accomplished over the period 1992–96; prices and exchange rates were fully liberalised, and Albania changed from a country of a three figure inflation rate and economic growth regression of −20% into a country with a one-figure inflation rate and with an average economic growth rate of 9% in 1992 and, in '93 – '96, 75% of GDP was generated from the private sector.

Albania opened towards the West: it signed the Partnership for Peace Agreement in 1994 and it became a member of the Council of Europe in 1995.

Berisha also introduced Islam to the Albanian political scene, pursued re-Islamisation of the country (approximately 74% Sunni Muslims of Albania's population) to reverse decades of anti-religious policy under Communism. Non-governmental organisations from Saudi Arabia and other parts of the Muslim world were invited in to build mosques and schools and provide other aid, and spread Wahhabi or Salafi Islam to Albania (and along with it, Saudi geopolitical influence).

The collapse of the Ponzi schemes towards the end of 1996, into which Albanians allegedly invested $1 billion worth of life savings from 1994, recapped the crisis. The schemes failed, one by one, from December 1996, and demonstrators took to the streets accusing the government of having stolen the money. In the midst of the crisis that had escalated into a civil war, Sali Berisha was re-elected president for a second five-year term on 3 March 1997 by a parliament totally controlled by the Democratic Party.

During the first ten days of March, the situation deteriorated, culminating in the desertion of large numbers of police and military, leaving their arsenals unlocked. These were promptly looted, mostly by militias and some criminal gangs, and for a time it looked like civil war would erupt between the government and rebels. Although the Prime Minister resigned immediately, Berisha refused opposition demands to step down, claiming he had to ensure continuity, and UN and European Multinational Forces were required to step in and take the situation under control. After their intervention in Albania, early elections were held in June 1997, leading to the victory of a socialist-led coalition of parties. On 23 July 1997, a month after the DP lost the 1997 elections to the left coalition, Berisha stepped down as president and was replaced by the socialist Rexhep Meidani. In 1997 he became the chairman of the Democratic Party, which became the biggest opposition party. He eventually returned to power as prime minister between 2005 and 2013.

== Leader of the Opposition (1997–2005) ==
The murder of DP MP Azem Hajdari on 12 September 1998, triggered two days of violent protests in Tirana. During Hajdari's funeral procession on 14 September 1998, armed DP supporters ransacked government offices, and for a brief period, held the PM's office, the parliament building, and the Albanian State television and radio building. Estimates of casualties during the protests and riots ranged between 3 and 7 deaths and 14 and 76 injuries. After 72 hours, the Government restored order and reclaimed tanks and armored personnel carriers seized by DP supporters that were being held at the Democratic Party main offices in Tirana. Parliament subsequently lifted Berisha's immunity due to his alleged role in what the government described as a coup d'état, but no charges were laid. Berisha blamed the Socialist Party of Albania and its leaders for the murder. Twelve people were arrested for their alleged involvement in the violence. In February 2002 five people, including Jaho Mulosmani, were sentenced for the murder by a Tirana district court.

Sali Berisha led the coalition of the center-right parties in the general elections held in five rounds in June–August 2001.

In the winter of 2004, a number of protests with over 20,000 people were organized by the opposition led by Berisha demanding Nano resign as prime minister which became known as the "Nano Go Away" Movement (Levizja "Nano Ik").

== Prime Minister of Albania (2005–2013) ==
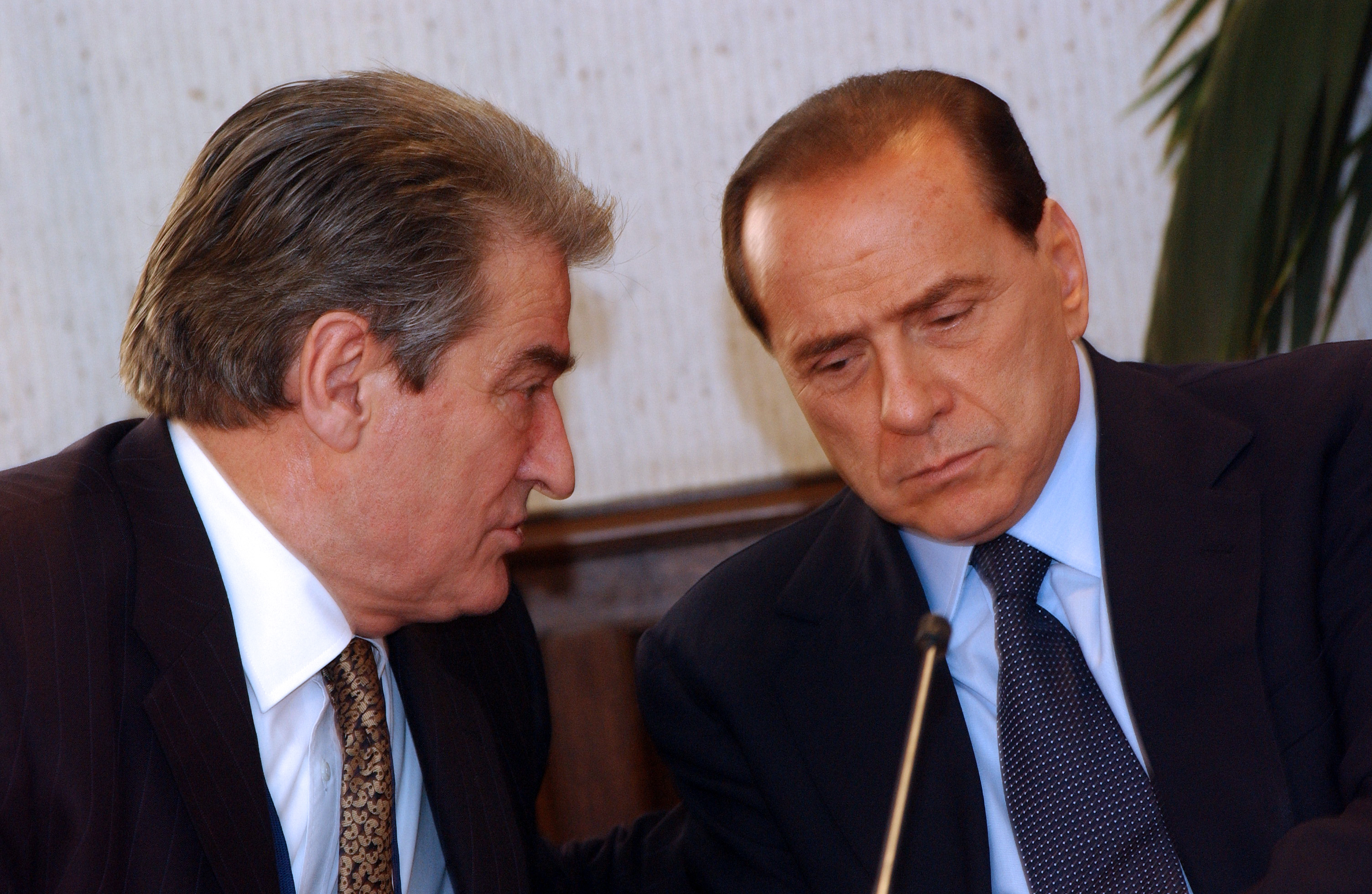
Berisha with Silvio Berlusconi in Meise, 2006.

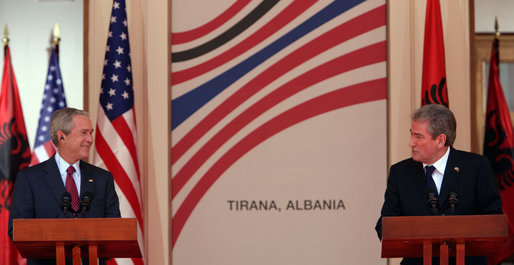
Berisha with George W. Bush in Tirana, 2007.

On 3 July 2005, Sali Berisha led a coalition of five right center parties into the 2005 parliamentary elections, which eventually won a majority of 74 MPs from a total of 140. He was appointed Prime Minister of Albania on 8 September 2005.

On 10 June 2007, Berisha met with U.S. President George W. Bush in Tirana. Bush became the first U.S. president to visit Albania and repeated his staunch support for the independence of neighbouring Kosovo from Serbia: "At some point in time, sooner rather than later, you've got to say, enough is enough. Kosovo is independent."

Berisha with Kostas Karamanlis and Nicos Anastasiades, 2005.

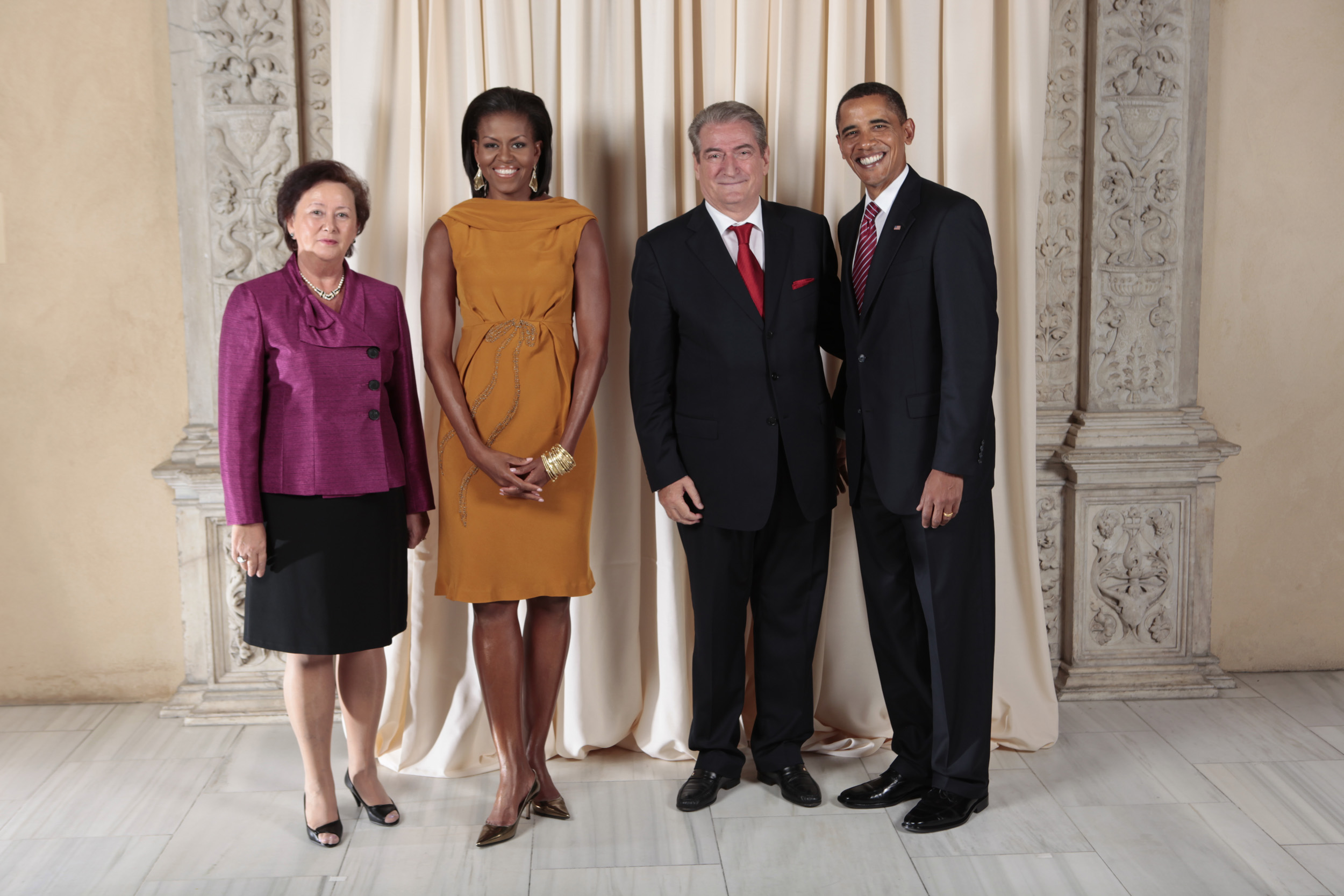
Sali & Liri Berisha with Barack & Michelle Obama, 2009.

On 15 March 2008, Berisha faced the toughest challenge of his government when an ammunition dump exploded in the village of Gërdec near Tirana, killing 26 people and injuring over 100. Defense Minister Fatmir Mediu resigned, and the press reported many irregularities at the blast site, operated by an Albanian company that deactivated the country's aging ammunition and then sold it for scrap.

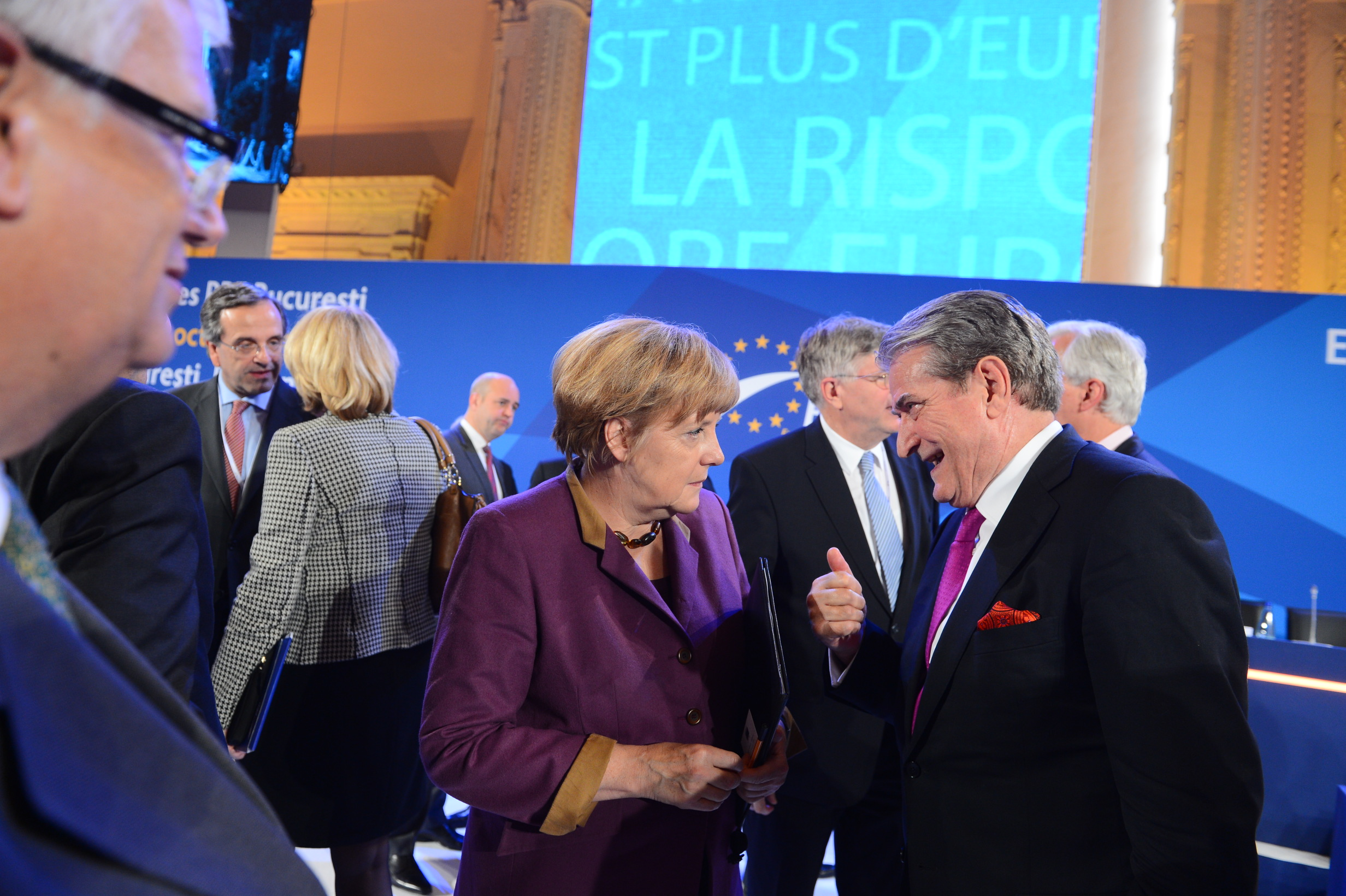
Berisha with Angela Merkel during the EPP Congress in Bucharest, 2012.

In June 2009, Democrats declared a narrow win in the parliamentary elections. Berisha's alliance came up one seat short of a majority and had to join forces with a splinter socialist party, the Socialist Movement for Integration of Ilir Meta, in order to retain power. Berisha appointed Meta to the post of deputy prime minister and at the same time Minister for Foreign Affairs, and later Minister of Economy, Trade and Energy. It was the first time since the start of multi-party democracy in 1991 that a ruling party had been forced into a coalition due to not winning enough seats on its own.

The 2009 elections were called flawed by the socialist opposition, which asked for a recount of the ballots. Berisha refused, on the ground that the Albanian Constitution does not call for such a procedure. He however called the opposition to the Parliament to change the Constitution, but the Socialist Party refused. The political crisis between government and opposition worsened over time, with the Socialists abandoning parliamentary debates for months and staging hunger strikes to ask for internal and international support. The EU attempted a conciliation, which failed. The ongoing political crisis was one of the reasons for the EU's refusal to grant Albania official candidate status in late 2010. However, the elections were certified by the OSCE/ODIHR as having marked significant progress in voter registration, the identification process, the legal framework, the voting process, the counting of votes and the resolution of complaints.

In 2009 during the government led by Berisha, more than 10,000 km of roads were built, connecting over 900 villages with the municipalities and 169 municipalities with the national road infrastructure with paved roads. To be mentioned are the Tirana-Elbasan road and, in particular, the Durrës-Kukës road, otherwise known as the "Nation Road", because it connected neighboring Kosovo with the city of Durrës. The latter crosses Albania from east to west and is the largest road project in the history of Albania. The construction of this road was criticized by the Socialist Party.

On 21 January 2011, clashes broke out between police and protesters in an anti-government rally in front of the Government building in Tirana. Four people were shot dead by government special forces, which Berisha gave the order for. The EU issued a statement to Albanian politicians, warning both sides to refrain from violence, while Berisha called the protests and subsequent charges by judges upon policemen as stages of an attempted coup against him – consequently, he attempted to consolidate his grip on state institutions. He accused the then-President of having been part of the coup after relations had soured between the two, and embraced his perceived victim status to install his own 'yes man' in the office.

In 2011, commenting on the Middle East, Berisha said: "Peace between Israel and the Palestinians must go through direct negotiations, and by guaranteeing the security of both states.... The solution must bring full security to both states, but I have not seen any support for the acceptance and recognition of the State of Israel."

Under his leadership, Albania made several strides in sustainable development. In the 2012 Environmental Performance Index, the country ranked 4th out of 132 countries, while maintaining an average GDP growth of 5.1% between 2007 and 2011. By 2012, the country was producing more than 96 percent of the energy through renewable hydropower resources. For his significant achievements and contributions to sustainable development, he was awarded the Fray International Sustainability Award in 2012.

After his party's defeat in the 2013 parliamentary election, Berisha resigned as party leader, but remained in parliament.

== Leader of the Opposition (since 2022) ==
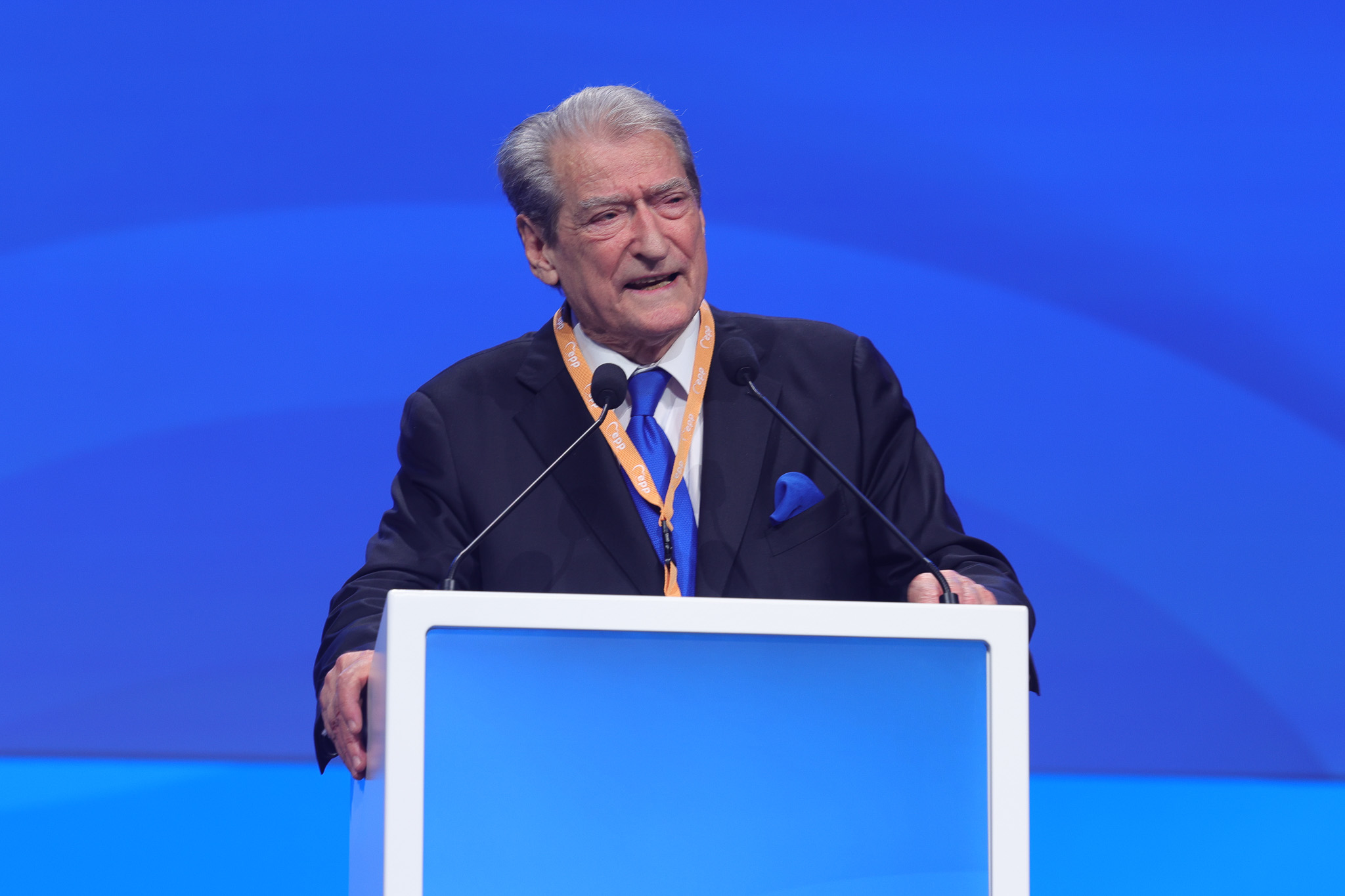
Berisha speaking in the EPP Congress in Valencia, 2025.

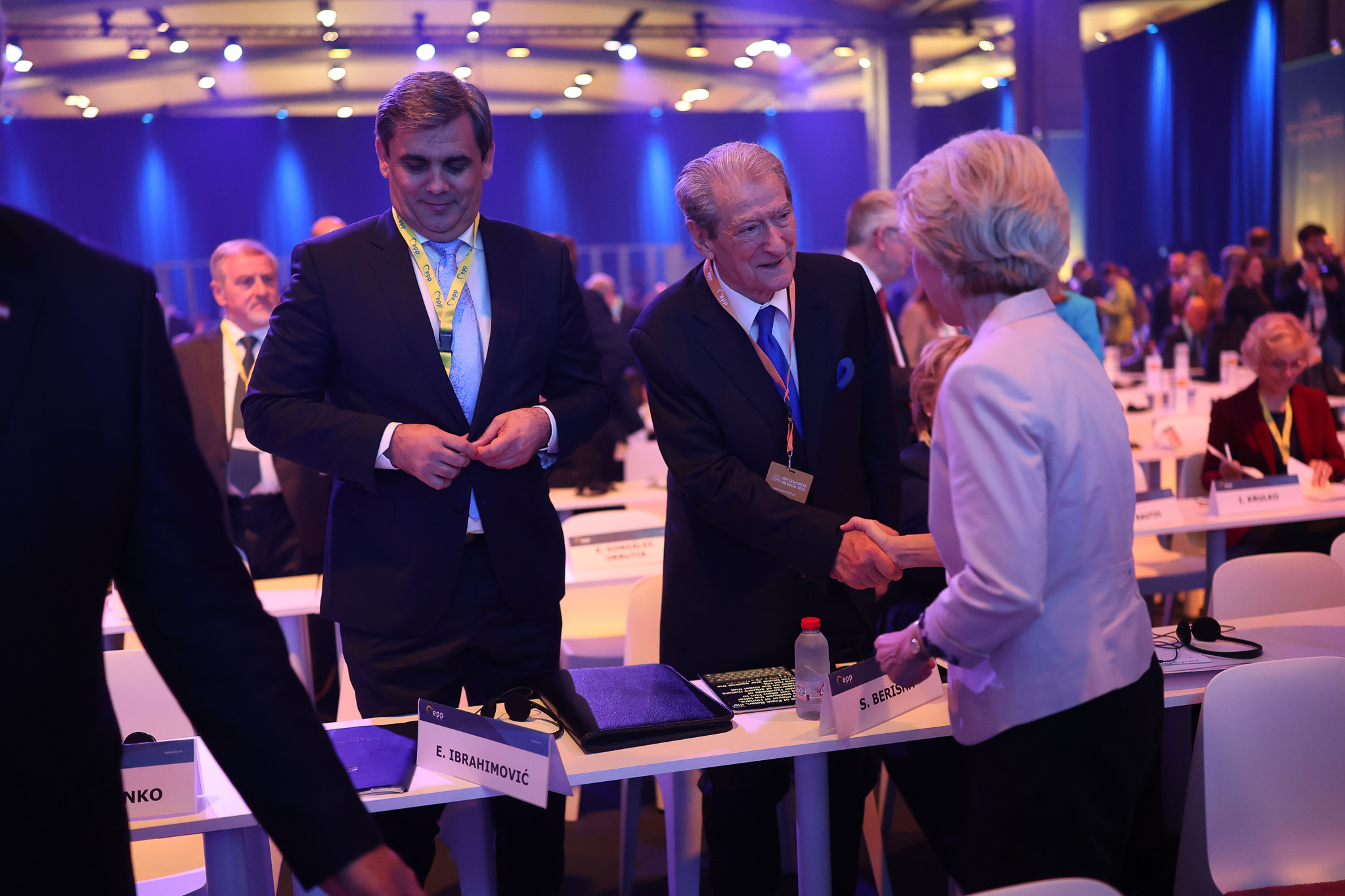
Berisha with Ursula von der Leyen during the EPP Congress in Valencia, 2025.

The Democratic Party led by Lulzim Basha, lost its third consecutive election in 2021, which led to many members of PD calling for him to resign. He refused to do so, following his win the party's leadership election, where he was backed by Berisha. On 9 September 2021, Basha expelled Berisha from the parliamentary group of PD due to the US Department of State designating him as non-grata. On 11 December 2021, the National Council of PD, called by Berisha and his faction, gathered at the Arena Kombëtare, where they voted to remove Basha as leader of the Democratic Party.

On 8 January 2022, Berisha and his faction, organized a protest outside the Democratic Party headquarters, where they tried to enter the building. This resulted in RENEA being called in due to the protest becoming violent.

On 21 March 2022, Lulzim Basha stepped down from party leadership, resulting on Enkelejd Alibeaj becoming the legal leader of PD. In the meantime, Berisha was considered the de facto leader, leading the re-foundation faction of the party and creating the Bashkë Fitojmë coalition in 2023 local elections. On 22 May 2022, he was elected leader of the PD, following a leadership election organized by the Re-Foundation Commission. He managed to win over 93.45% of the vote.

On 7 July 2022, he staged protests against the Albanian government over prices and wages in front of the Prime Minister's Office. Berisha also stated that the future of Albania and the Albanians was at risk and the people should decide in their own hands.

On 6 December 2022 during protests Berisha was physically attacked by an assailant. He indirectly accused Edi Rama and the government for organising the attack. The assailant's mother had told the media that her son had been suffering from mental problems for 5 years. He is awaiting trial. President Bajram Begaj, Prime Minister Edi Rama, and Lulzim Basha all condemned the assault on Berisha. Berisha himself forgave the perpetrator.

In December 2022, Zylfie and Muharrem Haklaj filed a lawsuit against Berisha and 15 other people in the Special Prosecution Against Corruption and Organized Crime (Struktura e Posaçme Anti-Korrupsion, SPAK) for allegedly ordering and directing the murder of their four brothers Shkëlqim, Halil, Fatmir and Ylli Haklaj in Tropojë in the late 1990s and early 2000s and the attacks with shells and TNT against their tower in the village of Kërrnajë.

On 11 June 2024, the Court of Appeal gave a final verdict recognizing Berisha as the official Chairman of the Democratic Party.

On 7 July 2026, in an interview with Truth Times, Berisha described the Flamingo Revolution as "the most important movement of the last 35 years", comparing them to the movement that overthrew Albania's communist regime in the early 1990s. He said the Democratic Party supported the protests but would not seek to lead them, called for Prime Minister Edi Rama's resignation and the formation of a non-partisan caretaker government, rejected the government's claims of foreign involvement in the demonstrations, and alleged that authorities had attempted to portray the protests as antisemitic while insisting the movement was "not, and is not, antisemitic".

== Personal life ==
Berisha is married to Liri Berisha (née Ramaj), a pediatrician. Liri Berisha is the president of Albanian Children Foundation. Her foundation focuses on children with autism and Down syndrome. The couple have two children, a daughter, Argita Malltezi (née Berisha) who is a professor of law at the University of Tirana, and a son, Shkëlzen Berisha.

On October 21, 2023, Berisha's son-in-law, Jamarbër Malltezi, was arrested by Albanian police on accusations of corruption and money laundering allegedly committed during Berisha's tenure as Prime Minister of Albania. Berisha was placed under investigation on suspicion of abusing his position as prime minister to help Malltezi privatize public land in order to build 17 apartment buildings in Tirana. Berisha has strongly denied the allegations, and has publicly accused the prosecutors of a political attack, claiming that they were acting on the orders of Prime Minister Edi Rama. In December 2023, Berisha was stripped of his parliamentary immunity and placed under house arrest. He was formally charged with corruption on 11 September 2024. Berisha was released following a court order on 27 November, while his freedom to travel abroad was restored by the Constitutional Court.

Elmar Brok, former Member of the European Parliament and former Chairman of the Committee on Foreign Affairs of the European Parliament, visited Berisha while under house arrest by labelling him as the last political prisoner in Europe considering that "a man should not be prohibited to go to Parliament until a court has taken a decision that he is guilty".

== Sanctions ==
On 19 May 2021, Berisha, his wife, son and daughter were sanctioned by the US Department of State and barred from entry into the United States after being accused of "involvement in significant corruption". On the press conference Secretary of State Antony J. Blinken stated:

In his official capacity as Prime Minister of Albania in particular, Berisha was involved in corrupt acts, such as misappropriation of public funds and interfering with public processes, including using his power for his own benefit and to enrich his political allies and his family members at the expense of the Albanian public's confidence in their government institutions and public officials.

Berisha has disputed the allegations, commenting that

"It is my deep conviction that this declaration against me has been based entirely on misinformation that Mr. Secretary of State Antony Blinken has gotten from a corrupted lobby process involving Edi Rama and George Soros, who are close friends." (...) "They have no evidence. None at all. If they announced one bit, I will be most thankful. But they have no concrete proof based on fact, not manipulation or slander."

On July 21, the British embassy in Tirana announced it had taken action against several Albanian individuals but did not disclose their names. The prime minister's special envoy to the Western Balkans Stuart Peach said in a statement:

This week, we took disruptive action against several Albanian individuals with well publicised and documented ties to criminality and corruption. This is the first wave of a set of actions intended to encourage accountability and end impunity.

The next day, Berisha revealed that he was subject to this action.

On 7 May 2025, Axios reporter, Marc Caputo tweeted that the U.S. Department of State, under the Second Trump Administration, would allow Berisha to visit the United States. Berisha and his political allies posted celebratory messages and insinuated that the non-grata designation had been lifted. However, according to Albanian media, two days later the State Department said that it had "no new information to provide at this time regarding this designation." According to the Albanian Times, Caputo's post "made no mention of a policy change or removal of Berisha’s “non grata” status. Instead, it refers to visa waivers—a longstanding practice used in special cases for reasons of national interest. Such waivers have previously been granted to controversial figures including Iran’s Mahmoud Ahmadinejad and Venezuela’s Nicolás Maduro, without altering their sanction status."

== Honours and awards ==
- 1996 – Knight Grand Cross with Collar of the Order of Merit of the Italian Republic (23 April 1996)
- 2009 – Doctor Honoris Causa of the University of Pristina
- 2009 – Doctor Honoris Causa of the International University of Struga
- 2012 – Kosovo Honorary Citizen of Deçan
- 2013 – Kosovo Honorary Citizen of Prizren
- 2013 – North Macedonia Honorary Citizen of Debar
- 2015 – National Flag Order (Albania), awarded by President Bujar Nishani

== See also ==
- List of presidents of Albania
- List of prime ministers of Albania
- Fall of communism in Albania
- 1997 Albanian civil unrest
- 2008 Gërdec explosions
- 2011 Albanian opposition demonstrations

Party political offices
New political party	Leader of the Democratic Party; 1990–1992	Succeeded by Eduard Selami
Preceded by Tritan Shehu	Leader of the Democratic Party; 1997–2013	Succeeded by Lulzim Basha
Preceded by Lulzim Basha	Leader of the Democratic Party; 2022–present	Incumbent
Political offices
Preceded by Ramiz Alia	President of Albania; 1992–1997	Succeeded by Rexhep Meidani
Preceded by Fatos Nano	Prime Minister of Albania; 2005–2013	Succeeded by Edi Rama
