= Party for the Defence of the Rights of the Emigrants =

Albanian political party

Party for the Defence of the Rights of the Emigrants (in Albanian: Parti per Mbrojtjen e te Drejtave te Emigranteve) is a political party in Albania. The party is led by Ymer Kurti.
