= Rama I Government =

Government of the Republic of Albania (2013–2017)

- 65th Government of Albania
- 2013‒2017
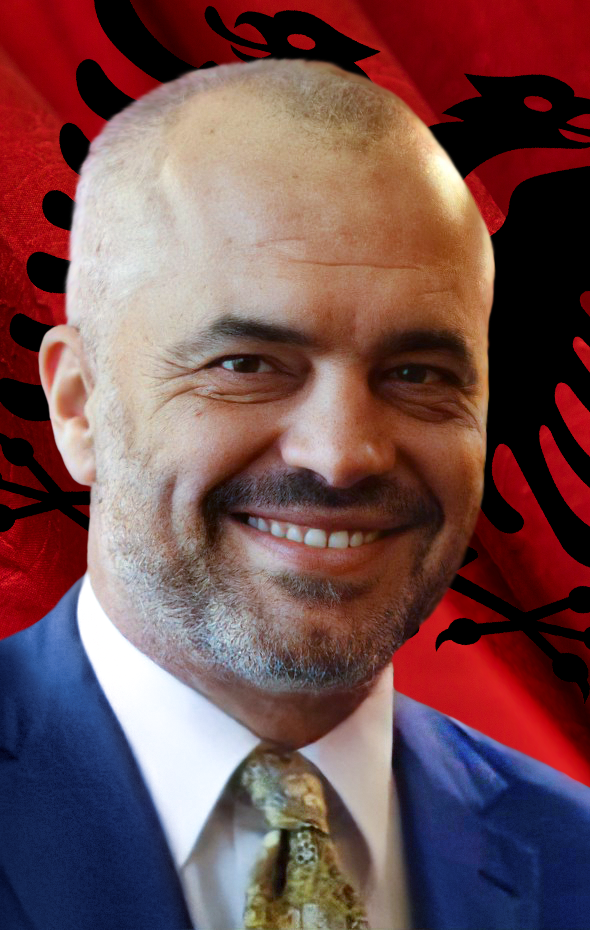
- Date formed: 15 September 2013
- Date dissolved: 13 September 2017

People and organisations
- President: Bujar Nishani
- Prime Minister: Edi Rama
- Deputy Prime Minister: Niko Peleshi; Ledina Mandia
- No. of ministers: 19 (Note: The PM and Deputy Prime Minister are not counted.)
- Total no. of members: 36
- Member parties: PS, LSI
- Status in legislature: Coalition
- Opposition parties: PD, PR
- Opposition leader: Lulzim Basha

History
- Election: 2013 election
- Predecessor: Berisha II Government
- Successor: Rama II Government

The first Government of Prime Minister Edi Rama was the 65th ruling Government of the Republic of Albania formed on 15 September 2013.

Following the 2013 election, the Socialist Party-led Alliance for a European Albania won a majority of seats to Parliament and formed the government. There is a record, six women in the government, which is a regional precedent as well. Rama said: "A team has been built with almost 90 percent of people sitting for the first time in the ministerial chair and probably with more women that all the governments of Albania have had all together in these 20 years."

== Issues ==
Amongst its first issues was a reshuffling of the domestic security infrastructure boost security and combat an increasing crime rate. In announcing the change, Rama said "We have inherited a security situation unthinkable for a country that is not in a state of war or armed conflict." The changes entailed a less centralised in order to be closer to the community. In this regard, the number of high-ranking officers was reduced from 811 to 255, the head of the General Directorate of Police Hysni Burgaj was replaced by former special forces commander Artan Didi and the heads of the police in the 12 administrative regions were also replaced, while units like the traffic police were disbanded.

Looking to gain membership to the European Union, it has gained the support of former British Prime Minister Tony Blair, he becoming an advisor to the government. It has also gained the support of the multiple EU governments to help propel it forward towards EU integration.

On 16 October 2013 the European Commission released its annual reports on prospective member states which concluded that the Albanian election was held in an "orderly manner" and that progress had been made in meeting other conditions and as such recommended granting Albania candidate status. On 5 December 2013 in an MEP meeting it was recommended that "...the Council should acknowledge the progress made by Albania by granting it candidate status without undue delay." However, several states, including Denmark and the Netherlands, remained opposed to granting Albania candidate status, and at a December 2013 meeting the Council of the European Union put off the decision until June 2014.

As done during his tenure as Mayor of Tirana, Rama stresses the modernization of public services and has started the process of modernizing and restoring customs and also employed the English "Crown Agents", to help reform the customs. Also done when mayor, the demolition of buildings by the NUCI, the National Urban Construction Institution, is an important matter for keeping the coast and Albania authentic.

== Cabinet ==
The first Rama Government on the day he took office consisted of 19 ministers, not including the Prime Minister and the Deputy Prime Minister.

Cabinet members
Portfolio	Minister	Took office	Left office	Party
Prime Minister	Edi Rama	15 September 2013	13 September 2017	PS
Deputy Prime Minister	Niko Peleshi	15 September 2013	22 May 2017	PS
Deputy Prime Minister	Ledina Mandia	22 May 2017	13 September 2017	Independent
Ministry of Finances	Shkëlqim Cani	15 September 2013	17 February 2016	PS
Ministry of Finances	Arben Ahmetaj	26 February 2016	22 May 2017	PS
Ministry of Finances	Helga Vukaj	22 May 2017	13 September 2017	Independent
Ministry of Internal Affairs	Saimir Tahiri	15 September 2013	19 March 2017	PS
Ministry of Internal Affairs	Fatmir Xhafaj	24 March 2017	22 May 2017	PS
Ministry of Internal Affairs	Dritan Demiraj	22 May 2017	13 September 2017	Independent
Ministry of Defence	Mimi Kodheli	15 September 2013	13 September 2017	PS
Ministry of Foreign Affairs	Ditmir Bushati	15 September 2013	13 September 2017	PS
Ministry of European Integration	Klajda Gjosha	15 September 2013	13 September 2017	LSI
Ministry of Justice	Nasip Naço	15 September 2013	10 November 2015	LSI
Ministry of Justice	Ylli Manjani	13 November 2015	31 January 2017	LSI
Ministry of Justice	Petrit Vasili	3 February 2017	22 May 2017	LSI
Ministry of Justice	Gazment Bardhi	22 May 2017	13 September 2017	PD
Minister of Transport and Infrastructure	Edmond Haxhinasto	15 September 2013	9 September 2016	LSI
Minister of Transport and Infrastructure	Sokol Dervishaj	9 September 2016	13 September 2017	LSI
Minister of Education and Sports	Lindita Nikolla	15 September 2013	22 May 2017	PS
Minister of Education and Sports	Mirela Karabina	22 May 2017	13 September 2017	Independent
Ministry of Economic Development, Tourism, Trade and Enterprise; The Department of Tourism was added to this ministry in February 2015	Arben Ahmetaj	15 September 2013	17 February 2016	PS
Ministry of Economic Development, Tourism, Trade and Enterprise; The Department of Tourism was added to this ministry in February 2015	Milva Ekonomi	26 February 2016	13 September 2017	PS
Ministry of Urban Development; Until February 2015, Ministry of Urban Development and Tourism	Eglantina Gjermeni	15 September 2013	13 September 2017	PS
Ministry of Agriculture, Rural Development and Water Administration	Edmond Panariti	15 September 2013	13 September 2017	LSI
Ministry of Health	Ilir Beqaj	15 September 2013	19 March 2017	PS
Ministry of Health	Ogerta Manastirliu	24 March 2017	22 May 2017	PS
Ministry of Health	Arben Beqiri	22 May 2017	13 September 2017	Independent
Ministry of Social Welfare and Youth	Erion Veliaj	15 September 2013	11 May 2015	PS
Ministry of Social Welfare and Youth	Blendi Klosi	26 May 2015	19 March 2017	PS
Ministry of Social Welfare and Youth	Olta Xhaçka	24 March 2017	22 May 2017	PS
Ministry of Social Welfare and Youth	Xhulieta Kërtusha	22 May 2017	13 September 2017	Independent
Minister of Culture	Mirela Kumbaro	15 September 2013	13 September 2017	PS
Minister of Energy and Industry	Damian Gjiknuri	15 September 2013	13 September 2017	PS
Minister of Environment	Lefter Koka	15 September 2013	13 September 2017	LSI
Minister of State for Relations with Parliament	Ilirjan Celibashi	15 September 2013	14 August 2014	PS
Minister of State for Relations with Parliament	Ermonela Felaj	27 August 2014	13 September 2017	PS
Minister of State for Innovation and Public Administration	Milena Harito	15 September 2013	13 September 2017	PS
Minister of State for Local Affairs	Bledar Çuçi	15 September 2013	19 March 2017	PS
Minister of State for Local Affairs	Eduard Shalsi	24 March 2017	13 September 2017	PS

== See also ==
- Politics of Albania
- Edi Rama

Preceded by Berisha II	Government of Albania; 2013–2017	Succeeded by Rama II
