= Albanian incinerators scandal =

Construction corruption scandal in Albania in the 2010s

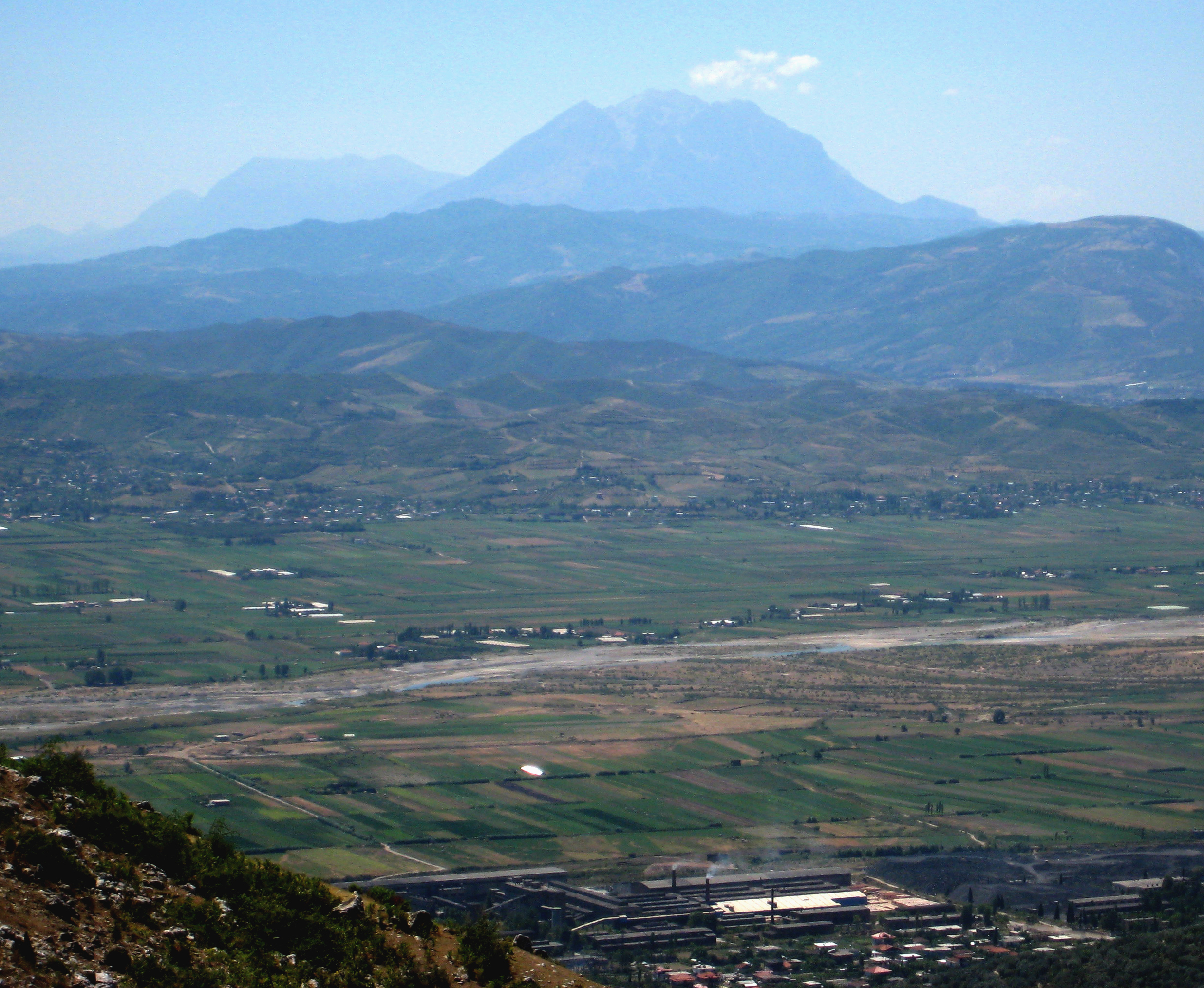
Older photo of the Elbasan area. In the foreground you can see the ruins of the Steel of the Party metallurgical complex, which now houses the local incinerator. The river Shkumbin is also visible in the middle of the photo.

The Albanian incinerator scandal refers to allegations of corruption and collusion between senior officials in the Rama government and private businessmen involving the construction and operation of three municipal waste incinerators in Elbasan, Fier and Tirana. The Balkan Investigative Reporting Network (BIRN) described the incinerator concessions as among the most controversial public-private partnerships of the Rama administration, with Albania's Supreme State Audit estimating potential costs to taxpayers exceeding €350 million over 30 years.

Prosecutors allege that senior officials misused public funds by awarding concession contracts in exchange for financial compensation. An investigation was initiated in 2021 following a criminal complaint by the Democratic Party (PD) and the Socialist Movement for Integration (LSI).

In 2022, 21 individuals and 12 legal entities were prosecuted over the Elbasan and Fier incinerator projects for corruption, money laundering, and related charges. In 2023, former minister Lefter Koka received 6 years and 8 months, Former Secretary-General of the Ministry of Environment Alqi Bllako 2 years and 8 months, and businessman Klodian Zoto 12 years. The verdict was overturned in 2024, and a retrial was ordered.

== Background ==
The rapid shift towards consumerism in Albanian society has doubled the amount of waste produced in the last two decades. According to the Japan International Cooperation Agency, the per capita increase in municipal waste in Tirana, especially in the last decade, is comparable to or higher than in other major cities around the world. But waste management methods remain outdated. Most waste is buried. There is no source separation and recycling rates are low. The Sharra landfill, the country's largest landfill, is old, polluted and poorly maintained. As the country faced one environmental emergency after another, the government rushed to the quickest but most environmentally destructive solution: incineration.

In 2011, Albania launched the "National Strategy for Waste Management" for the period 2011-2025 with Law No. 10 463 "On Integrated Waste Management", which aligned Albanian legislation with Directive 2008/98/EC of the European Parliament and of the Council. This meant that in Albania priority would be given to waste reduction, resource recovery, maximizing recycling and reuse of waste.

However, in 2014, although the national strategy and the EU directive considered incineration as a solution of last resort, the government, in a decision whose legality has been strongly questioned, changed its strategy by promoting incineration. Specifically, in February 2014, the "Government Commission for Integrated Waste Management" declared Albania to be in a state of environmental emergency, paving the way for the construction of incinerators.^{a}

== The case ==
On 5 February 2014, in the presence of Prime Minister Edi Rama, the inter-ministerial "Committee on Integrated Waste Management" was convened, which, on the proposal of the Deputy Minister of Urban Development and Tourism, Gjon Radovani, declared the country in an environmental emergency. Two committee members - Ylli Manjani and Arben Isaraj - opposed the proposal, questioning the legality of the decision. Although the committee did not reach a consensus, the Cabinet document as a circular with the signature of only 3 of the 5 committee members.

Challenges to this initiative have focused on its legally non-existent basis, as the 2011 law does not provide for such a procedure for declaring a national emergency. According to Manjani, inter-ministerial committees are policy advisory mechanisms where no binding decisions are taken, especially as according to the Albanian Constitution only the government can declare a state of emergency. Legitimacy came only from the simple decision of the cabinet of 23 October 2013 to add this possibility to the committee. In fact, Rodion Gjoka, an expert in the Urban Environment Management Unit at the Institute for Habitat Development (Co-Plan), argued that the decision was taken deliberately to legitimize the preconceived decision to create incinerators that otherwise could not be implemented since it is the last in the waste management hierarchy."

Based on the above-mentioned circular, the Ministry of Environment signed three BOT contracts: with "Albtech Energy" in December 2014 for the construction and operation of an incinerator in Elbasan, with "Integrated Technology Waste Treatment Fier" in October 2016 for the Fier region, and with "Integrated Energy BV SPV" in August 2017 for Tirana.

=== Elbasan incinerator ===
In July 2014, the Municipality of Elbasan submitted a request to the Ministry of Environment for the construction of an incinerator with the objective of improving waste management within the boundaries of the Municipality. On the same day that the Municipality submitted its request, "Albteck Energy", the future developer of the project, was established. In December 2014, "Albtech Energy", represented by its founder and legal representative Stela Gugallja, entered into a Build-Operate-Transfer (BOT) concession agreement for the turnkey supply of a 2.85 MV electricity capacity municipal waste thermal treatment plant in Elbasan. The company promptly secured a loan from "Bank Credins", backed by the concession agreement, and commenced construction in March 2015 on the Elbasan landfill site, which was formerly the location of the old metallurgical plant. The project was officially launched on 18 April 2017 with the presence of Prime Minister Edi Rama. The Prime Minister commended the project as a pivotal element in Albania's transition to green energy and environmental protection.

In the period preceding 31 December 2021, which marked the conclusion of the seven-year concession contract, the municipalities of Elbasan, Librazhd, Prrenjas, Belsh, Gramsh, Cërrik and Peqin, in collaboration with the state administrator, established the "ECO-ELB" sh.a. consortium with the objective of operating and managing the incinerator going forward. On 14 December 2021, the SPAK, in the context of the judicial investigation, issued a seizure warrant of the facility and arrest warrants for Albteck's owners and managers. However, in order for the project to continue its operation, the "State Agency for the Administration of Seized and Confiscated Properties" (APSK), gave the consortium the right to rent the facility for a nominal fee of 1 Euro per day allowing the project to continue its operation. As of 1 January 2022, "Eco-Elb" assumed control of the municipal waste landfill, while a lease contract was signed for the management of the incinerator. In June 2022, the incinerator ceased operation due to the discovery of issues with specific components during a scheduled maintenance period. These components were subsequently repaired or replaced, with the repair process taking 10 months to complete. The public was informed of the repair status in April 2023, when the mayor of Elbasan, Gledian Llatja, announced the incinerator's reopening. The cessation of operations over the past ten months has resulted in the emergence of a new environmental issue in the area. This has even led to contamination of the Shkumbin river, which flows adjacent to the site where the waste was disposed of.

From December 2023 until today (December 2024), the plant is again out of operation due to the need for repairs and the purchase of new parts and machinery. The surrounding area has once again turned into an arbitrary landfill in which garbage is burned secretly at night.

==== Prosecutions and penalties ====
In October 2023, the Special Court's decision found guilty the following people:

- Lefter Koka for passive bribery and money laundering.
- Pëllumb Abeshi, Bardhyl Çabiri, Serafin Papa and Jonida Zeqo members of the bid evaluation committee for of abuse of power committed in collaboration.
- Mirel Mërtiri, the de facto owner of the company Albtek Energy, which implemented the concession of the Elbasan incinerator.
- Mirel Mërtiri's wife, the de jure owner of the Elbasan incinerator, Stela Gugallja.
- Klodian Zoto, owner of the company Integrated Technology Service, which carried out the works for the construction of the Elbasan landfill and incinerator.

=== Fier incinerator ===
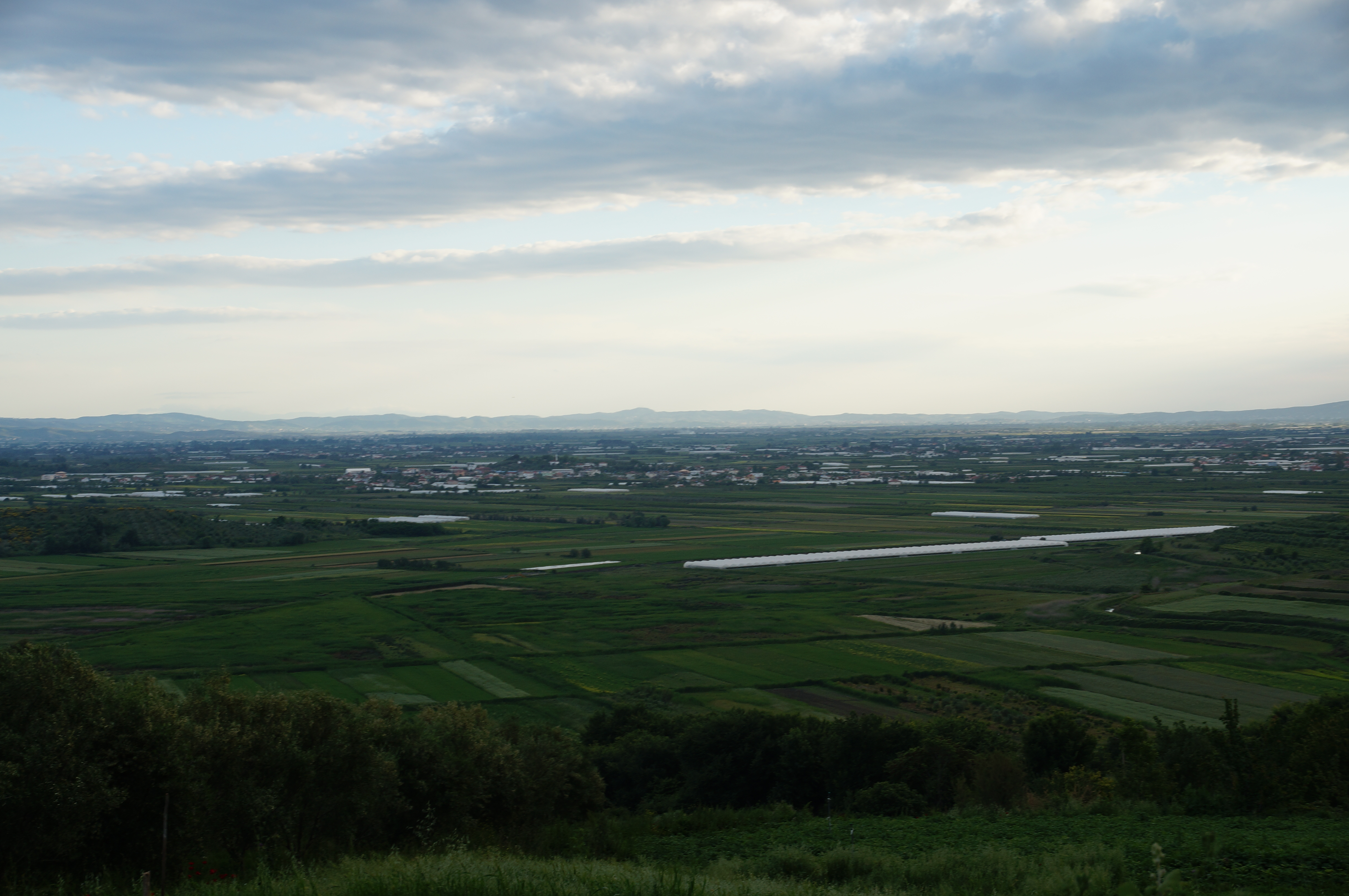
Myzeqe plain

In October 2015, the town council of Fier decided to ask the "Committee on Integrated Waste Management" to request the declaration of an environmental emergency in the field of waste management in the city.

At the same time, and following the same pattern as the incinerator in Elbasan, the company "Integrated Technology Waste Treatment Fier" (founded on 3 October 2015 by Christian Zotto, owner of "Integrated Technology Service LLC and Italian Ernesto Granelli, owner of "Energy Recuparator Spa") signed on 24 October the BOT concession contract with the Ministry of the Environment for approximately 35 million euros including VAT. A few days later Granelli sold its stake in "Integrated" to "Ndertim Montimi Patos LLC" and on 10 November "Integrated" signed a contract with Granelli's "Energy Recuperator" for the construction of the incinerator in Fier for just €15 million. On 15 November "Integrated Technology Waste Treatment Fier" signed a contract with the same bank, (Credins), as in Elbasan and obtained a loan for the construction of the incinerator, using the state contract as a guarantee.

The area where the incinerator was to be built was defined by the Municipality of Fier and located in the south-eastern part of the administrative unit of Mbrostar, in Verri in the Myzeqe plain. When the construction company began fencing off the site in March 2017, only the residents were informed of the project. According to EUROSAI, local residents were not even involved in the decision-making process when they were not invited to give their opinion on the project.

A series of protests and demonstrations against the construction began, and work was temporarily halted. Although the Prime Minister stated during the 2017 election campaign that the project would not be implemented without the consent of the residents, this commitment no longer applies. Ιn October of the same year, the "National Council of the Territory" decided to approve the construction permit for the incinerator in the village of Verri. In 2018, residents and the "Alliance Against the Importation of Waste" (AKIP) sued the project's stakeholders, but courts of first and second instance dismissed the case.

The area is considered an agricultural habitat, as 90% of its surface consists of fertile agricultural land cultivated with vegetation such as wheat and alfalfa, which supply the entire Albanian food market. Farmers in the region are concerned that emissions from the incinerator will contaminate their crops with dangerous carcinogenic and toxic chemicals, while villagers are concerned that the emissions will worsen air quality and harm the local population.

==== Prosecutions and penalties ====
In 2022, the SPAK prosecuted 21 individuals and 12 legal entities on charges of abuse of power, active and passive corruption of high state officials or local elected officials, laundering of proceeds and proceeds of criminal offence or criminal activity, breach of duty, passive bribery of persons performing public functions, VAT fraud.

In September 2023, Lefter Koka was sentenced to 6 years and 8 months in prison, former MP Alqi Blacko to 2 years and 8 months, and Christian Zoto to 12 years. The other defendants received shorter sentences and some were acquitted. However, in December 2024, the "Special Court of Appeal for Organized Crime and Corruption" in which the SPAK appealed against the judgment seeking longer sentences, overturned the decision and requested a retrial at the first instance court with different judges.

== Notes ==
^a According to the Prime Minister, instead of separating and recycling waste, the Albanian government has chosen the alternative of treating it to produce energy. "We did not build incinerators, but waste treatment plants that produce energy".
