= Minister for Innovation and Public Administration (Albania) =

Former government ministry of Albania

Minister of State of Innovation and Public Administration
- Ministër për Inovacionin dhe Administratën Publike

Ministerial post overview
- Formed: 15 April 2010
- Dissolved: 15 September 2013
- Jurisdiction: Council of Ministers
- Status: Dissolved
- Headquarters: Tirana, Albania
- Minister responsible: Milena Harito (PS)

The Minister of State Innovation and Public Administration (Albanian: Ministri për Inovacionin dhe Administratën Publike) was a ministerial post of the Albanian government responsible for innovation and information and communications technology that functioned from 2010 until 2017.

The last minister serving was Milena Harito of the Socialist Party.

Harito is a French and Albanian citizen. She is an information and communications technology engineer and a has a Ph.D. degree from the Paris VI “Pierre et Marie Curie” University.

Harito engaged in politics in 2012 after a carrier in the private sector in France in the telecommunications sector where she held different research and managerial positions from 1997 until 2012.

In September 2013 she was appointed Minister of Innovation and Public Administration in Albania from the Prime Minister Edi Rama and she led major reforms focused in the European integration of Albania. During this mandate Albania transformed the merit-based recruitment system for civil servants and the management of public employees careers and trainings.

A complete reform of the public services was achieved aiming to fight corruption and based in an ad hoc law on Public Services Delivery introducing customer care principles, standardization, simplification of procedures and digitalization of hundreds of public services.

During her mandate an incentive framework for start-ups was created with the support of the Italian government

She is currently advisor of the Prime Minister of Albania working in the creation of the Regional Economic Area of the six western Balkans countries.

Harito was awarded “Chevalier de l’Ordre National du Mérite” with a 2017 decree of the French president Macron.

== Officeholders (2010–2017) ==
1. Genc Pollo (15 April 2010 – 15 September 2013)
2. Milena Harito (15 September 2013 – 13 September 2017)
