= Shkëlqim Cani =

Albanian economist and politician

Minister of Finance
- In office 15 September 2013 – 17 February 2016
- Prime Minister: Edi Rama
- Preceded by: Ridvan Bode
- Succeeded by: Arben Ahmetaj

Governor of Bank of Albania
- In office August 1997 – October 2004
- Preceded by: Qamil Tusha
- Succeeded by: Ardian Fullani

Personal details
- Born: 6 May 1956 (age 70) Tirana, Albania
- Party: Socialist Party
- Education: University of Tirana

Shkëlqim Cani (born 6 May 1956) was Governor of the Bank of Albania from August 1997 to October 2004. Later on, Ardian Fullani took over the position. He is also the Minister of Finance-designate in the Rama I Government of Prime Minister-designate Edi Rama.

Political offices
Preceded by Ridvan Bode	Minister of Finance; 2013–2016	Succeeded by Arben Ahmetaj
