= Senida Mesi =

Albanian politician and professor

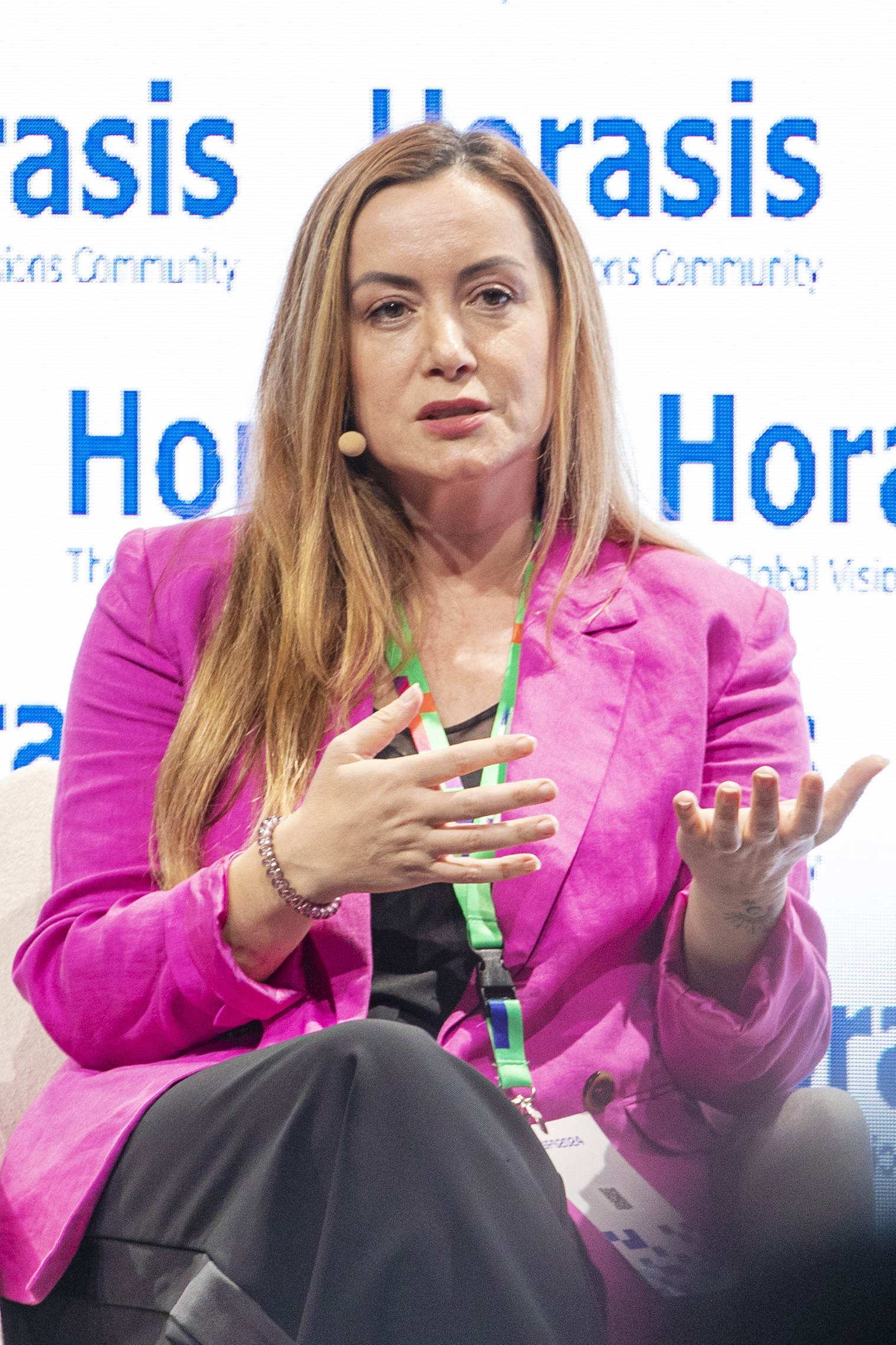
- Mesi in 2024

Member of Parliament
- In office 25 June 2017 – 10 September 2021
- President: Bujar Nishani; Ilir Meta
- Prime Minister: Edi Rama
- Constituency: Shkodër

Deputy Prime Minister of Albania
- In office 13 September 2017 – 17 January 2019
- President: Ilir Meta
- Prime Minister: Edi Rama
- Preceded by: Ledina Mandia
- Succeeded by: Erion Braçe

Personal details
- Born: 16 December 1977 (age 48) Shkodër, Albania
- Party: Socialist Party of Albania
- Spouse: Artan Mesi
- Children: 3
- Occupation: Banker, professor
- Cabinet: Rama II Cabinet

Senida Mesi (born 16 December 1977) is an Albanian politician and professor. She served as the Deputy Prime Minister of Albania from 13 September 2017 to 17 January 2019. She also has been a member of parliament representing Shkodër from 2017 to 2021.

== Early life ==
Mesi was born in Shkodër, Albania on 16 December 1977. In 2000, she graduated from the business administration department of the University of Tirana. In 2013, Mesi was certified as an accountant.

Mesi lectured at the University of Shkodër "Luigj Gurakuqi" until she was elected to Parliament in 2017.

== Political career ==
In 2015, Mesi was elected a member of the municipal council for Shkodër. During the 2017 parliamentary elections, Mesi ran as a member of the Socialist Party. On 25 June 2017, Mesi was elected a member of the Parliament of Albania for Shkodër. In August 2017, Edi Rama announced that Mesi would be the next deputy prime minister of Albania.

== Personal life ==
Mesi is married to Dr. Artan Mesi. They have three children.
