= Arben Ahmetaj =

Albanian politician (born 1969)

Arben Ahmetaj MP

Deputy Prime Minister of Albania
- In office 18 September 2021 – 25 July 2022
- President: Ilir Meta
- Prime Minister: Edi Rama
- Preceded by: Erion Braçe
- Succeeded by: Belinda Balluku

Member of the 28th, 29th, 30th and 31st Parliament of Albania
- In office 7 September 2009 – 26 December 2013 (Note: Due to a political choice made by the Prime Minister Edi Rama, the deputies who would serve as ministers would have to hand over the mandate of the deputy with the reasoning that the minister will have to focus only on the executive work.)
- President: Bamir Topi; Bujar Nishani
- Prime Minister: Sali Berisha; Edi Rama
- Parliamentary group: PS
- Constituency: Korçë (2009–2013); Gjirokastër (2013)
- Incumbent
- Assumed office 9 September 2017
- President: Ilir Meta
- Prime Minister: Edi Rama
- Parliamentary group: PS
- Constituency: Tirana (2017–2025)

Ministry of Economic Development, Tourism, Trade and Enterprise
- In office 15 September 2013 – 17 February 2016
- President: Bujar Nishani
- Prime Minister: Edi Rama
- Succeeded by: Milva Ekonomi

Ministry of Finances
- In office 26 February 2016 – 22 May 2017
- President: Ilir Meta
- Prime Minister: Edi Rama
- Preceded by: Shkëlqim Cani
- Succeeded by: Helga Vukaj
- In office 13 September 2017 – 5 January 2019
- Prime Minister: Edi Rama
- Preceded by: Helga Vukaj
- Succeeded by: Anila Denaj

Minister of State for Reconstruction and Reform Program (Note: It was established after the 2019 earthquake as ministerial post without portfolio to deal with the reconstruction of damage caused to infrastructure, housing, and compensation to people affected by the disaster. In 2021 new government, was given the task of overseeing the Government Reform Program.)
- In office 20 December 2019 – 28 July 2022
- President: Ilir Meta
- Prime Minister: Edi Rama

Personal details
- Born: 28 June 1969 (age 57) Gjirokastër, Albania
- Party: Socialist Party
- Education: University of Kentucky; Georgetown University

Arben Ahmetaj (born 28 June 1969) is an Albanian former politician who served as the Deputy Prime Minister of Albania from September 2021 to July 2022. Since 2013 previously has served in several important departments such as: Minister of Economic Development, Minister of Finance, as well as Minister of State for Reconstruction after the devastating earthquake in 2019 that occurred in the central area of the country.

Arben Ahmetaj is accused of undeclared properties and investments as well as passive corruption by businessmen Klodian Zoto and Mirel Mërtiri in connection with the incinerator scandal. He is currently declared an international wanted by SPAK.

== Early life and education ==
Arben Ahmetaj was born in Gjirokastra on June 28, 1969. He completed his studies in English, specializing in American and English Literature, at the University of Tirana. He completed his master studies at the University of Kentucky from 1995 to 1997 in International Trade and Diplomacy, as well as his doctorate at the University of Bucharest with the topic "Energy Security, International Security". He successfully completed a scholarship to Georgetown University, Edmund Walsh School of Foreign Service, Washington D.C, and has been a participant in the Khokalis program at Harvard University. Arben Ahmetaj has worked as an external lecturer at the University of Tirana.

== Political career ==
From 1998 to 1999, Ahmetaj held the position of Chairman of the General Directorate of Taxation. He served as Deputy Minister in the Ministry of Energy and Industry from 2003 to 2004 and as Deputy Minister in the Ministry of European Integration from 2004 to 2005.

=== Involvement in the "Incinerator affair" ===
In 2018, Ahmetaj faced allegations regarding his alleged involvement in the Incinerator affair. The accusations were brought forth by the Democratic Party, prompting further scrutiny and investigation.

In response to the accusations, Ahmetaj was called upon to provide testimony before the Parliamentary Inquiry Committee, which convened from November 2021 to March 2022. During his testimony, he faced numerous questions, particularly from the Chairwoman of the Inquiry Committee, MP Jorida Tabaku, concerning his association with individuals who purportedly profited 430 million euros from the state budget. Notwithstanding these inquiries, Ahmetaj denied any connections to Klodian Zoto and Mirel Mërtiri at that time, while simultaneously defending his support for the Tirana Incinerator project and the involvement of the aforementioned individuals.

Following the conclusion of the Inquiry Committee's proceedings, Prime Minister Edi Rama took decisive action and dismissed Ahmetaj from his position. Subsequently, he was also removed from party offices. The gravity of the situation escalated when, in July 2023, the Special Prosecution Office (SPAK) forwarded a formal request to the Parliament seeking authorization for Ahmetaj's arrest.

During this period, there were attempts by the Socialist Majority to prolong the process, which garnered attention and concern. Meanwhile, news began to circulate that Ahmetaj had left Albania. His lawyer, acting in accordance with the removal of his political immunity, revealed that his client had sought refuge in the United Kingdom.
