= Ardian Fullani =

Albanian banker

Governor of the Bank of Albania
- In office October 2004 – September 2014
- Vice President: Elisabeta Gjoni
- Preceded by: Shkëlqim Cani
- Succeeded by: Elisabeta Gjoni

Personal details
- Born: 1955 (age 70–71) Tirana, Albania
- Education: University of Tirana

Ardian Fullani (born 1955) was the governor of the Bank of Albania from October 2004 until 6 September 2014. He instantiated the Governor's Award, an annual award given to the best diploma dissertations prepared by Albanian undergraduate students.

Fullani graduated from the University of Tirana in Finance in 1977 and Law in 1991.

He commenced his work at the State Bank of Albania in 1985.

Fullani joined the Bank of Albania in 1992 as the deputy governor. In 1993, he was appointed head of the Foreign Relations Department and served in this position until 1996.

During 1996-1997, Fullani focused his career on consultancy in national and international development projects.

Fullani has been the governor of the Bank of Albania and chairman of its supervisory council since October 2004. He was a dealer.

Governor Fullani is awarded the title Commendatore dell'Ordine della Stella della solidarietà italiana/Order of the Star of Italian Solidarity, by the president of the Republic of Italy.

Fullani was arrested on 5 September 2014 under the accusation of abuse of the power, related with a steal scandal in Bank of Albania. He initially refused to step down
