= Ledina Mandia =

Albanian politician (born 1974)

Deputy Prime Minister of Albania
- In office 22 May 2017 – 13 September 2017
- President: Bujar Nishani; Ilir Meta
- Prime Minister: Edi Rama
- Preceded by: Niko Peleshi
- Succeeded by: Senida Mesi

Personal details
- Born: 3 June 1974 (age 52)
- Party: Democratic Party of Albania
- Education: University of Shkodër; University of Tirana (Ph.D.)

Ledina Mandia (born June 3, 1974) served as Deputy Prime Minister in the Cabinet of Albania. She was the third woman to be appointed to the position. She is a technocrat, independent politician, appointed to the post after months of opposition demonstrations, demanding technocrat Ministers in the government. She was proposed by the Democratic Party.

== Biography ==
She was born in Tirana on 3 June 1974. She finished her Law Studies in the University of Shkodër, where she worked as a full-time lecturer. Later in 2005 she finished her Master and Ph.D.Studies in the University of Tirana.

During 2007–2013 she worked for the Advocate General office, serving as Head of the Institution from 2010 until 2013. During her time as General Advocate she represented Albania in several arbitration processes.

Since May 2017 she serves as Deputy Prime Minister of Albania. Before taking the position of Deputy Prime Minister she served shortly as policy adviser to the President of Albania.
