= Sandër Lleshaj =

Albanian politician (born 1963)

Minister of Internal Affairs
- In office 16 November 2018 – 10 December 2020
- President: Ilir Meta
- Prime Minister: Edi Rama
- Preceded by: Fatmir Xhafaj

Personal details
- Born: 25 January 1963 (age 63) Selitë, Mirditë, Albania
- Party: Socialist Party
- Height: 160 cm (5 ft 3 in)
- Children: 2
- Education: University of Tirana

Sandër Lleshaj (born 25 January 1963) is an Albanian politician who has served as the Minister of Internal Affairs of Albania.

== Early life ==
He was born in Selitë, Mirditë, Albania on January 25, 1963. He remained in his hometown until he was 14 years old.

== Military career ==
As for his education in the military field, he began in 1978-1985 when he attended the Skanderbeg Military High School and the Military Academy. From 1994 to 1999 he completed a series of courses, such as the German language at the National Defense Academy in Vienna (Austria); advanced German language course at the Federal Language Institute (Bundessprachenamt) in Germany; course of the Battalion Commander at the Anti-Artillery Artillery School in Rendsburg, Germany; General Staff course at the Academy of Management in Hamburg, Germany and European Security course at the Academy of Management in Hamburg, Germany. In 2008, Lleshi completed the Senior Executive Seminar at the George C. Marshall Center for European Security Studies in Garmisch-Partenkirchen, Germany; In 2011 he completed the International Higher Defense Management Course at the Naval Graduate School in Monterey, California, USA.

He has held the position of Deputy Chief of the General Staff of the Armed Forces of Albania since 2010. From 1996 to 2000, General Lleshi was Commander of Courses at the Defense Academy in Tirana and then, for three more years, Commander of the Skanderbeg Military Academy. In 2003-2006 he served as Defense Attaché of the Republic of Albania in Germany.
