= Mimi Kodheli =

Albanian economist and politician

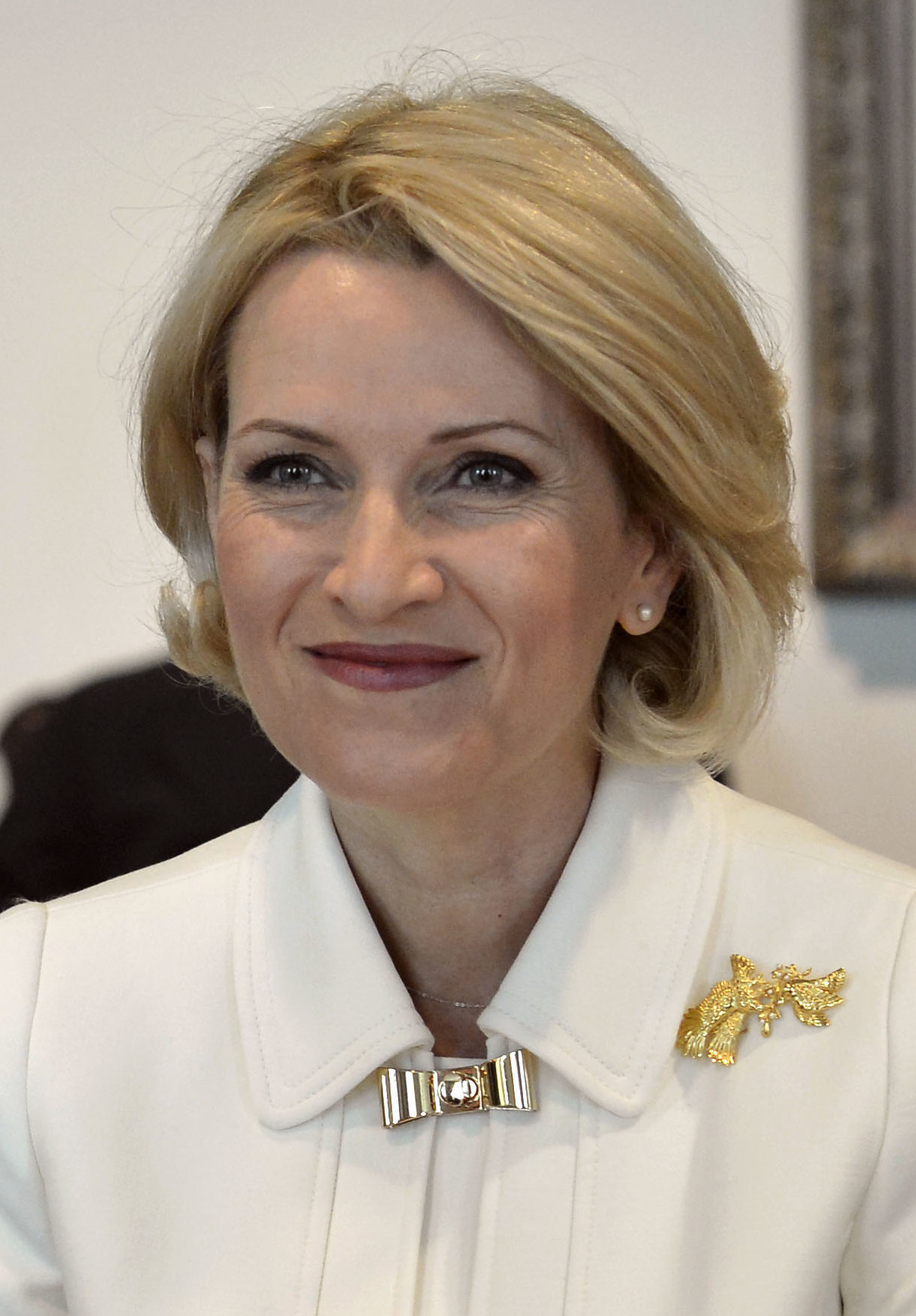

33rd Defence Minister of Albania
- In office 15 September 2013 – 11 September 2017
- President: Bujar Nishani; Ilir Meta
- Prime Minister: Edi Rama
- Preceded by: Arben Imami
- Succeeded by: Olta Xhaçka

Member of Parliament
- In office 7 September 2009 – 12 September 2025
- Prime Minister: Edi Rama; Sali Berisha

Vice President of the NATO Parliamentary Assembly
- Incumbent
- Assumed office 23 November 2020

Personal details
- Born: 11 September 1964 (age 62) Tirana, PR Albania
- Party: Socialist Party
- Spouse: Leka Kodheli
- Children: Mikel Kodheli
- Education: University of Tirana; University of Nebraska–Lincoln, United States (MPA) (Note: Acronym preferred by the University of Nebraska); University of Verona, Italy (Ph.D.)

Mimi Kodheli (born 11 September 1964) is an Albanian economist and politician who served as Minister of Defense of Albania in the government of Prime Minister Edi Rama. She was the first woman to be appointed to the post.

== Early life and education ==
Kodheli was born in Tirana, on 11 September 1964.

She received a Doctorate in Economic Science at the University of Verona, Italy, in cooperation with the University of Tirana, Economic Faculty, in 2007. She has a master degree in Public Administration from the Lincoln University in Nebraska, United States, in cooperation with University of Tirana since 2000, and also graduated from the University of Tirana, Economic Faculty, in Finance in 1986. She has studied in various fields such as, international markets, bond and assets, labour and investment markets, trainings on small and medium enterprises and banking management. She has participated in a programme of the U.S. State Department, “Women in Politics”, and in the National Security Policy programme of the Marshall European Centre for Security Studies

She speaks fluent English and Italian, and knows the French and Spanish languages.

== Career ==
Kodheli entered politics in 2002, when she was appointed Deputy Mayor of the Tirana Municipality. In 2005, she was appointed Prefect of the Tirana County.

Since the 2009 national elections, Kodheli has been a Member of Parliament holding the position of Vice Chair of the Economy and Finance Committee throughout the legislature. Since 2007, she is a member of the Socialist Party of Albania leadership.

Kodheli was appointed Minister of Defense in the government of Prime Minister Edi Rama on 15 September 2013, replacing Arben Imami in the post. In this capacity, she joined forces with her Croatian counterpart Damir Krstičević and wrote a letter to NATO Secretary-General Jens Stoltenberg in 2017, calling on NATO to revise plans for its peace-keeping mission in Kosovo and arguing that nationalist rhetoric by Serb politicians threatens to destabilise the region scarred by the 1990s wars.

Since 2017, Kodheli has been serving as chairwoman of the Committee on Foreign Affairs.

== Personal life ==
Kodheli is married. She has a son, Mikel.
