= Erion Braçe =

Albanian politician

Deputy Prime Minister of Albania
- In office 17 January 2019 – 18 September 2021
- President: Ilir Meta
- Prime Minister: Edi Rama
- Preceded by: Senida Mesi
- Succeeded by: Arben Ahmetaj

Member of the Albanian Parliament
- Incumbent
- Assumed office 26 May 1996

Personal details
- Born: 2 April 1972 (age 54) Tirana, Albania
- Party: Socialist Party
- Children: 2
- Education: University of Tirana

Erion Braçe (born 2 April 1972) is an Albanian politician who served as the Deputy Prime Minister of Albania from January 2019 until September 2021.

== Early life ==
Erion Braçe was born in Tirana on 2 April 1972. He completed his studies at the University of Tirana’s Faculty of Economy, branching in finance. Braçe worked as a journalist at the Zëri i Popullit newspaper between the years 1993–1997 and served as the paper's Editor-in-chief from 1998 to 2007.

== Political career ==
In 1994, Braçe became a member of the Socialist Party's General Steering Committee. Between 1997 and 2001 he was a member of the Committee on Economy, Finance and Privatization. He has been elected as member of the Albanian Parliament for six legislatures and previously served as Chairman of the Committee on Economy and Finances. He was appointed Deputy Prime Minister on 28 December 2018 and was confirmed by a presidential decree on 4 January 2019 until his suspension in September 2021.

== Private life ==
Braçe is married and has a daughter and a son.
