= 2017 Albanian opposition protests =

Series of anti-government protests in Albania

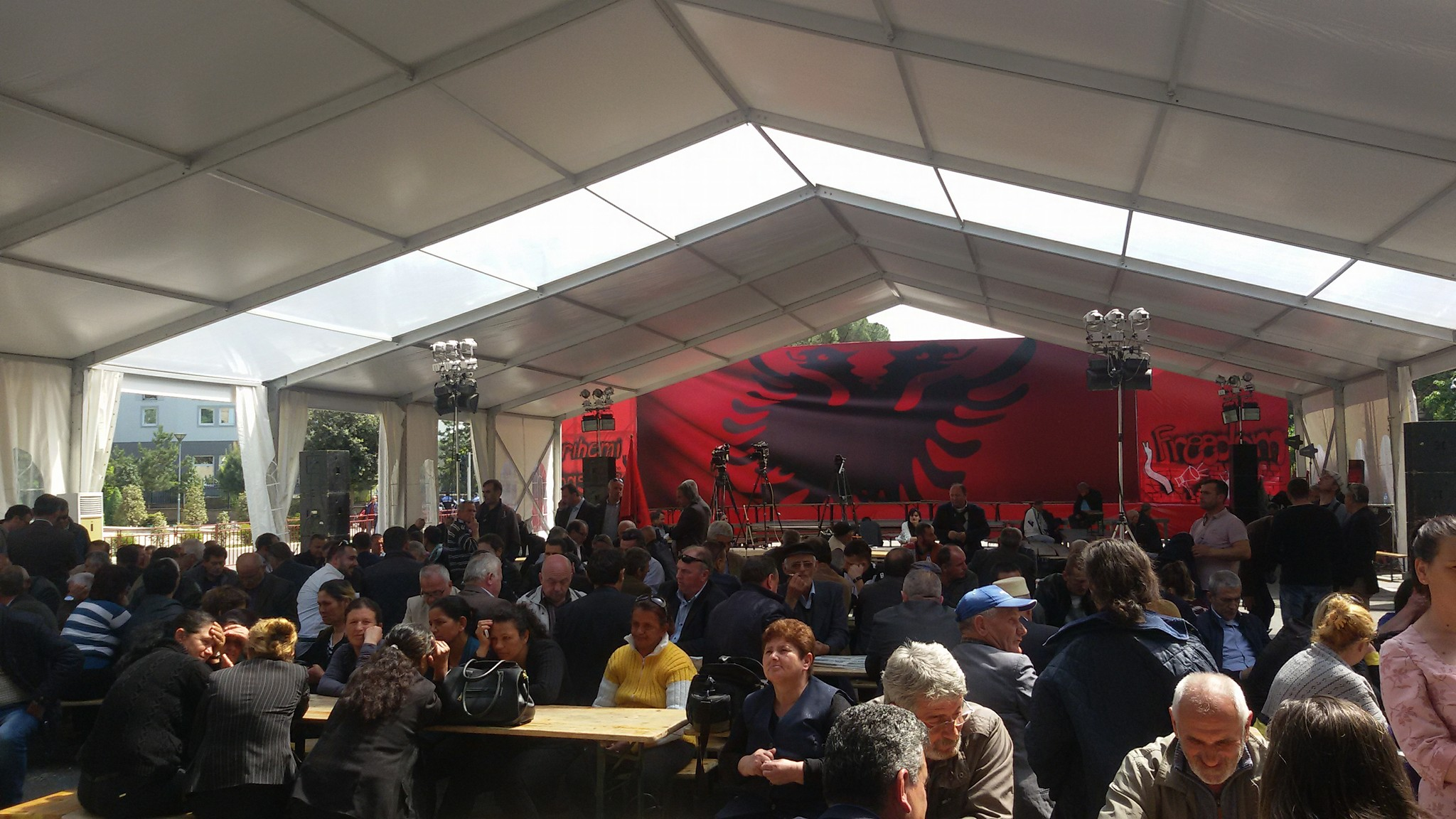
- The Tent of Freedom, where the opposition held daily meetings with the supporters during the protest
- Date: 18 February 2017 – 18 May 2017 (3 months)
- Location: Albania
- Caused by: Corruption; Reported elections fraud; Illegal drugs trade
- Goals: Removal of Prime Minister Edi Rama; Fighting illegal drugs trade and the involvement of government officials.; Free elections
- Methods: Demonstrations, civil disobedience, civil resistance, election boycott
- Result: Postponement of elections; Opposition received Deputy Prime Minister and six ministerial positions

Parties
Albanian Opposition: Democratic Party of Albania; Republican Party of Albania; Unity for Human Rights Party; Red and Black Alliance	Government of Albania: Socialist Party of Albania; Socialist Movement for Integration

Lead figures
Lulzim Basha, Leader of the Opposition	Edi Rama, Prime Minister; Ilir Meta, Speaker of the Parliament

The 2017 Albanian opposition protests were a series of anti-government protests, largely in Tirana, which centered around poverty, corruption, the illicit drug situation in Albania, fear of electoral fraud in the parliamentary elections, and alleged manipulation of the voting process by the government.

On 18 February 2017, thousands of government opposition protesters gathered on the main boulevard in Tirana to demand free elections and a technocratic government. Protesters subsequently erected a tent, The Tent of Freedom, in which the opposition held daily meetings with supporters. The opposition announced that it would boycott the parliament until the government accepted dialogue on forming a technocratic government.

== Background ==
Prior to the opposition protests, the drug situation in Albania and subsequent war on the drug trade had become major problems in the country, causing international concern. The political opposition accused the government, especially the then-Minister of Interior Affairs of Albania, Saimir Tahiri, of being involved in cannabis production.

At the beginning of 2017, the Democratic Party raised concerns about the upcoming electoral process, calling for an electronic voting process for the June 2017 elections to prevent vote manipulation. However, the government considered the implementation of an electronic voting system impossible due to time constraints, and accused the opposition of blocking Albania's integration into the European Union and the passage of judicial reform.

== The protest ==
A week prior to the protest, the Democrat MPs announced in the Parliament of Albania that the opposition would boycott the parliament because of the current situation in the country. They demanded free elections and called for a massive protest to start on 18 February.

During the protests, thousands gathered in front of the Prime Minister's Office, accusing the government of trying to manipulate the voting process. The Democratic Party was joined by other smaller parties such as the Republican Party, the Unity for Human Rights Party, the Environmentalist Agrarian Party, the Christian Democratic Party, and the Red and Black Alliance, among others.

After the rally, the opposition announced that a giant tent would be pitched and that the demonstrations would continue until the governing coalition between Socialist Prime Minister Edi Rama and LSI President Ilir Meta would accept the opposition conditions on forming a "technocrat" government to take the country to free and fair elections.

On 12 March, four ministers, including Interior Affairs minister Saimir Tahiri, resigned as tensions increased. Rama refused to step down and reiterated his commitment to free and fair elections. He also accused the opposition of using the protests to block the vetting of certain judges and to obstruct the country's legal system.

The protest further escalated after the protesters began calling for an election boycott. On April, Democratic Party chairman Lulzim Basha warned that the opposition parties might boycott the June legislative elections if their demands were not met. The 9 April was the final deadline for all the parties to submit lists of candidates for 18 June vote, and none of the opposition parties registered for the process. The boycott was also to cover the local elections to be held in Kavajë on 7 May due to former mayor, Elvis Roshi being dismissed due to having hidden his past criminal convictions. On 5 April, the right-wing city counselors in Tirana boycotted the city council meeting, in a sign of solidarity with the opposition's protest.

After Rama turned down the right-wing opposition's request for the creation of a caretaker government, LSI, a major party in the government coalition, announced it would not take part in an election without the opposition, considering it not normal for a country that is a member of NATO, as well as one with aspirations of joining the European Union.

On 25 April, two representatives from the European Parliament, Knut Fleckenstein and David McAllister, came to Tirana to mediate a solution to the ongoing deadlock. By this time, the tension was already increased after protesters, joined by Basha, blocked several roads in and around Tirana.

On 5 May, Prime Minister Rama announced that his party would withdraw their candidate for the Kavajë elections, which were called off until further discussion with the opposition.

On 13 May, another protest was called in Tirana by the Democratic Party and the opposition coalition to focus on what Basha called a "New Republic," anticipating a productive end to their then 83 day long protest.

== Aftermath ==
On 17 May, the political parties, represented in parliament, held a meeting initiated by two of the opposition parties: the Republican Party of Albania and the Environmentalist Agrarian Party. All the party leaders attended the meeting, which continued until the early hours of 18 May with Lulzim Basha and Rama discussing the offered solution package from David McAllister. The solution came after Hoyt Brian Yee of the US State Department visited Albania, setting a deadline for the leaders to find a solution to the political crisis.

The agreement proposed changes in the government cabinet, with one Deputy Prime Minister position to be allotted to the opposition, the postponement of the election date and an electronic voter identification system.

After more than 5 hours of negotiations, both parties signed an agreement, postponing the elections for a week, to 25 June. The administration also agreed to give the opposition the post of Deputy Prime Minister and 6 ministerial positions, including the Minister of Internal Affairs, Minister of Justice, Ministry of Education, Sports and Youth, and Ministry of Finances and Economy.

== Reactions ==
=== Domestic ===
- The President of Albania proposed an initiative and was urged to sit with all the political parties to dialogue.
- Ilir Meta, Speaker of the Parliament and chairman of the LSI, the main government ally, expressed his sorrow for the lack of political dialogue and indicated that LSI will continue to act in the best interest of the dialogue and an electoral process in a manner which meets EU standards.

=== International ===
- European Union - The EU condemned the protests and stressed the importance of free and fair elections, especially if Albania wished to join the EU. Commissioner Johannes Hahn said he regretted the parliamentary boycott announced by the opposition and that the cooperation of government and opposition is crucial for the country's ambition to join the European Union.
- Organization for Security and Co-operation in Europe - The OSCE expressed their concern that the political situation and lack of dialogue between the parties could undermine the upcoming electoral process in the country.
- Austria - The Austrian ambassador to Albania stated: "The most important thing is that the political parties sit and dialogue with each other because the dialogue is the essence of democracy. The most important thing is that the political parties participate in the electoral process. Elections are the basis of democracy".

== See also ==
- 2017 Romanian protests
- 2017 Serbian protests
