= Saimir Tahiri =

Albanian politician

Minister of the Interior
- In office 15 September 2013 – 19 March 2017
- President: Bujar Nishani
- Prime Minister: Edi Rama
- Preceded by: Flamur Noka
- Succeeded by: Fatmir Xhafaj

Member of the Albanian parliament
- In office September 2009 – May 2018

Personal details
- Born: 30 October 1979 (age 46) Tirana, Albania
- Party: Socialist Party (2005–2017); Independent (September 2017 – May 2018)
- Education: University of Tirana

Saimir Tahiri is a convicted Albanian politician, who served as the Minister of Interior Affairs in the government of Prime Minister Edi Rama from 2013 to 2017.

In 2019 he was sentenced to 5 years in prison, reduced to 3 years and 4 months due to the abbreviated trial on charges of abuse of office. He was suspected as involved in organized crime and of helping his cousins in international drug smuggling while serving as Minister of Interiors. In June 2023 his detention was changed to house arrest due to health problems.

== Early life and education ==
Tahiri was born in Tirana, on October 30, 1979. He holds a master's degree in public law from the University of Tirana, Faculty of Law, and has a bachelor's degree in law from University of Tirana, Faculty of Law.

He has been awarded the title of lawyer since 2008. In 2006 to 2008, he was a part-time lecturer at the Faculty of Law and several other higher education institutions.

== Political career ==
In 2009, he was elected Member of the Assembly representing the Socialist Party for Tirana Region in the 18th Legislature. He was also appointed vice chair of the Parliamentary Group. In 2011, Tahiri was elected as chairman of Tirana Socialist Party Branch. From 2009 to 2013 he was a member of the Committee of Legal Affairs, Public Administration and Human Rights.

=== Minister of Interior ===
On 15 September 2013, he was appointed as Minister of Internal Affairs in the 1st Rama Government. During the first months of his mandate, following the prime minister's orders, Tahiri ordered raids on Lazarat, a secluded village in Albania's south, famed for industrial-scale cannabis cultivation. During the raid, 71 tonnes of marijuana were seized by the Police.

In the following years, the drug situation in Albania and the war on illegal trade became a bigger problem and a huge concern for the international community.

On February 18, the opposition launched a protest, which continued for 3 months. One of the main demands was the resignation of Saimir Tahiri. On March 12, four ministers of the Cabinet, including Tahiri, resigned.

== Charges of membership of a criminal group and prosecution ==
On October 16, 2017, the Guardia di Finanza of Catania arrested the members of an Albanian–Italian mafia group including 4 Italians and 3 Albanians. According to the Italian prosecution, the criminal group had trafficked over 3.5 tons of cannabis, guns and other weapons over the last few years, with a yearly profit of €20 million. Among the persons arrested was also Moisi Habilaj, one of three Habilaj brothers, well known to the Albanian public because of frequent public accusations for drug trafficking to Greece and Italy. The Habilajs were Tahiri's cousins and during his time as Minister of Interior, the Opposition accused him of collaborating with the Habilaj Gang.

In the transcripts of the Italian police, that wiretapped while investigating the Habilaj Case, came also Tahiri's name. Immediately after that the Prosecution Office asked the country's parliament to greenlight the arrest of MP and former Interior Minister Samir Tahiri, after confirming it suspected he had played a role in a crime ring smuggling cannabis to Italy.
Although Tahiri was expelled from the Socialist Party's parliamentary group, the party -which holds the majority of seats- voted against the prosecution's request to lift the MP's immunity and arrest him, citing a lack of sufficient evidence. They did, however, agree to the restrictive measure of a travel ban, his interrogation and a police search of his home.

On May 3, 2018, he resigned from his MP status while the investigation went on for months.

In September 2019, prosecutors demanded 12 years in prison for Tahiri under charges of participation in a criminal organization and international drug trafficking.

=== Cleared on drug charges ===
On 19 September 2019, the Serious Crime Court sentenced Tahiri to 5 years in prison, which was reduced to 3 years and 4 months due to the abbreviated trial. The court dropped all the three charges by prosecutors and sentenced him on a different charge – abuse of office.
