= Olta Xhaçka =

Albanian politician (born 1979)

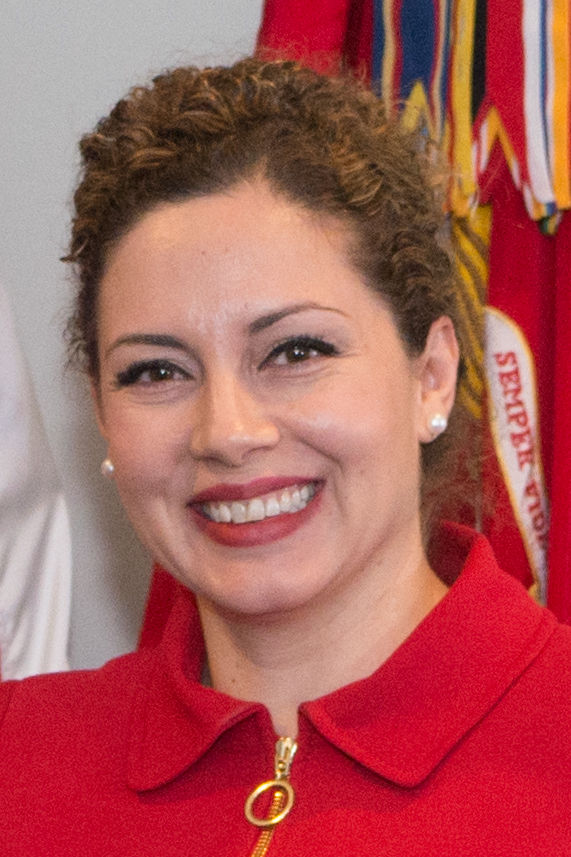
- Xhaçka in 2018

Minister of Europe and Foreign Affairs
- In office 4 January 2021 – 12 September 2023
- President: Ilir Meta
- Prime Minister: Edi Rama
- Preceded by: Edi Rama; Gent Cakaj
- Succeeded by: Igli Hasani

34th Defence Minister of Albania
- In office 11 September 2017 – 31 December 2020
- Prime Minister: Edi Rama
- Preceded by: Mimi Kodheli
- Succeeded by: Niko Peleshi

Minister of Social Welfare and Youth
- In office 24 March 2017 – 22 May 2017
- Prime Minister: Edi Rama
- Preceded by: Blendi Klosi
- Succeeded by: Xhulieta Kërtusha

Personal details
- Born: 25 December 1979 (age 46) Tirana, PSR Albania
- Party: Socialist Party
- Education: Clark University

Olta Xhaçka (born 25 December 1979) is an Albanian politician and Socialist Party member of Parliament. She served as the minister of Europe and foreign affairs from January 2021 to September 2023. She served as Albanian minister of social welfare and youth between March 2017 to August 2017 and as minister of defense from September 2017 to December 2020.

== Education and career ==
Xhaçka received a bachelor's in Political Science and International Relations from Clark University with honors, along with an MPA.

Since 2009, Xhaçka is part of the Socialist Party Parliamentary Group, initially as a representative of the region of Korça, throughout two legislatures.

Prior to her engagement into politics, Ms. Xhaçka has been actively involved in civil society, in the field of human rights and good governance. She has also worked for three years as a lecturer of political sciences at the University of New York Tirana.

As an activist of human rights, mainly in the field of gender equality and acting as the Chair of the Socialist Woman's Forum, Ms. Xhaçka, since 2014, has chaired the Minors Issues, Gender Equality and Domestic Violence Sub-committee. She also has been a member of the Work, Social Issues and Health Committee and member of the International Affairs Parliamentary Committee.

Ms. Xhaçka is a member of the Socialist Party Chairmanship and Chair of the Socialist Woman's Forum, since 2010. She also chaired the Qemal Stafa Foundation from 2015 until 2017 upon her appointment in the Albanian government.

=== Minister of Social Welfare and Youth ===
In March 2017, Ms. Xhaçka was appointed Minister of Social Welfare and Youth. She served in this role for only a few months, until the ministry was dissolved in August 2017 and absorbed by other ministries.

=== Minister of Defence ===
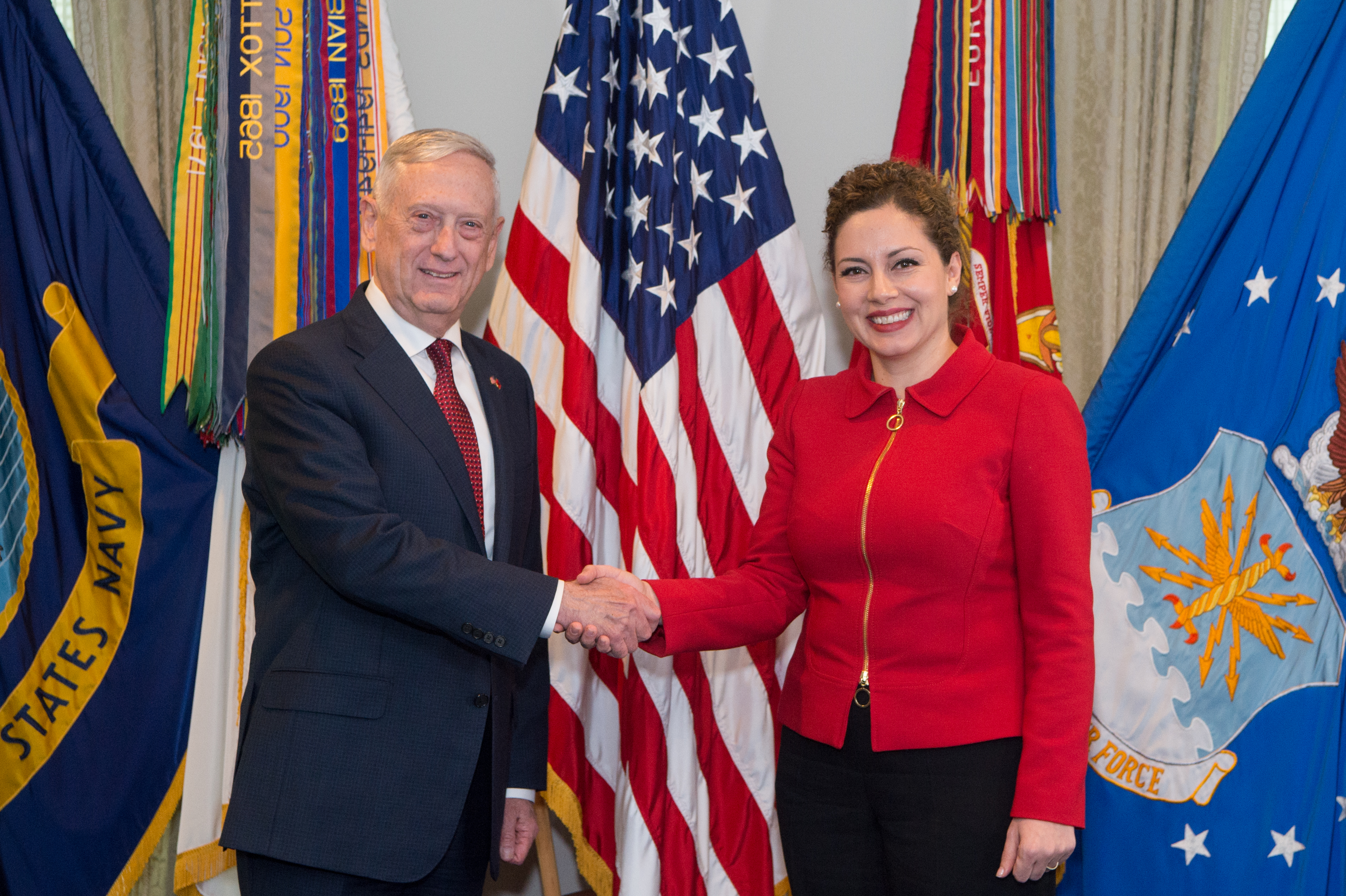
Xhaçka with James Mattis.

She was re-elected to parliament in June 2017, this time in Tirana. Her district had the greatest increase in votes for the Socialist Party since the 2013 parliamentary elections of any in Tirana.

In September 2017 she took the office of the Minister of Defence in the 2nd Rama Government, making her the second woman to be appointed to that office after Mimi Kodheli.

In April 2018 she met U.S. Secretary of Defense Jim Mattis at the Pentagon where Mattis reaffirmed "the strong defense relationship between the United States and Albania."

=== Minister of Foreign Affairs ===
In January 2021, Xhacka was appointed as the new Foreign minister of Albania after the resignation of the Acting Minister, Gent Cakaj from the office.

As Foreign Minister, she presided over the resettlement of Afghan refugees into Albania following the Taliban takeover of Afghanistan in August 2021. During her tenure as foreign minister, Albania has also taken a seat on the UN Security Council for the first time in its history.

== Personal life ==
Xhaçka is married to Artan Gaçi, who also served as a Socialist MP and they have a daughter, Hana.

Political offices
Preceded by Blendi Klosi	Minister of Social Welfare and Youth of Albania; 2017	Succeeded by Xhulieta Kërtusha
Preceded by Mimi Kodheli	Minister of Defense of Albania; 2017–2020	Succeeded by Niko Peleshi
Preceded by Edi Rama	Minister of Europe and Foreign Affairs of Albania; 2021–present	Incumbent
