= Fatmir Xhafaj =

Albanian politician (born 1959)

Fatmir Xhafaj MP
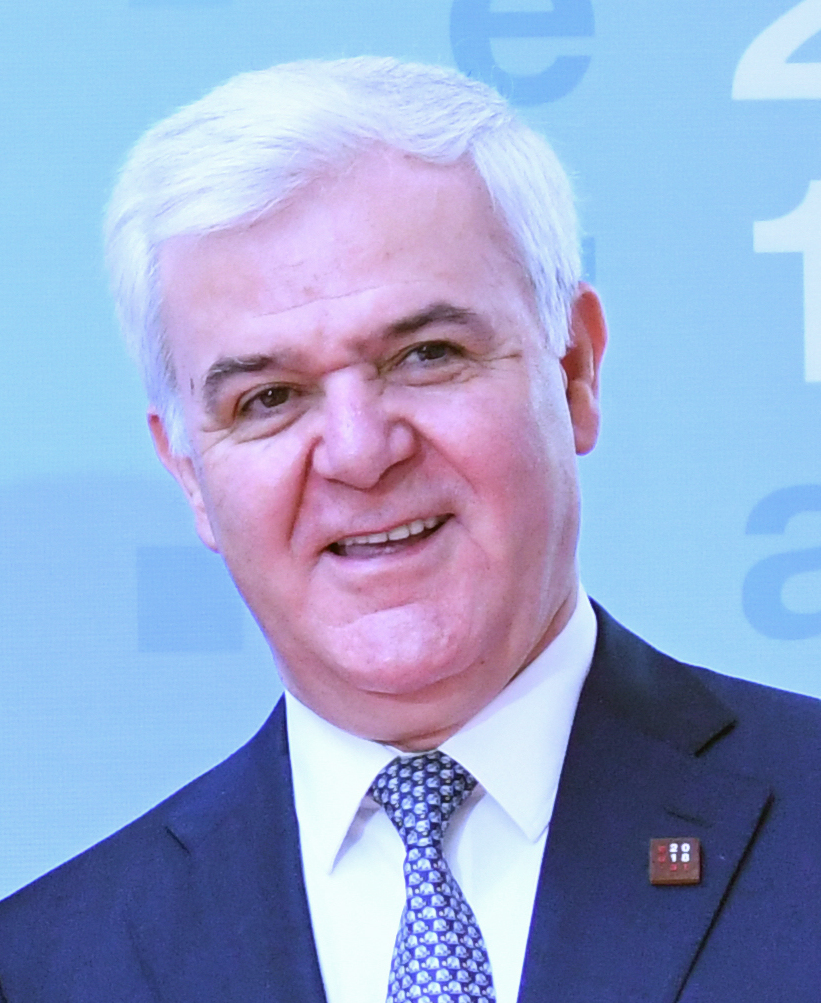
- Fatmir Xhafaj in 2018

Member of the Albanian Parliament for Tirana
- Incumbent
- Assumed office 25 June 2017

Ministry of Internal Affairs
- In office 24 March 2017 – 22 May 2017
- Prime Minister: Edi Rama
- Preceded by: Saimir Tahiri
- Succeeded by: Dritan Demiraj
- In office 13 September 2017 – 27 October 2018
- Prime Minister: Edi Rama
- Preceded by: Dritan Demiraj
- Succeeded by: Sandër Lleshaj

Personal details
- Born: May 17, 1959 (age 67) Vlorë
- Party: Socialist
- Education: University of Tirana

Fatmir Xhafaj (born 17 May 1959, in Vlorë) is an Albanian politician, chair of the Ad Hoc Parliamentary Committee on the Judicial System Reform of the Parliament of Albania. He served as the Albanian Minister of Interior Affairs from 2017 to 2018.

== Education ==
Xhafaj graduated in Legal and Political Sciences (Justice) at the University of Tirana in 1982. He then worked as a lawyer (Judicial Adviser, Judge, Prosecutor), as well as high level functionary for various youth and social organizations in 1982–1986.

He then served as legal advisor for a consultancy company in 1994–1997, and was a freelance professional lawyer and law firm founding partner in 1999–2001.

== Political career ==
Xhafaj is member of the Socialist Party of Albania since 1991, and has been Secretary for Legal Matters of the party in 2005-2011 and Coordination Secretary since 2011. He is also member of the Headship of the party since 2007.

Xhafaj has been an elected MP for the Socialist Party of Albania, representing the Tirana County, from the V to the VIII legislatures (since 2001). He has co-chaired the Ad Hoc Committee for the Electoral Reform in 2003, 2007 and 2009, and was deputy chairman of the Parliamentary Committee for Legal Issues, Public Administration and Human Rights in 2009–2013. Since September 2013 he chairs the Parliamentary Committee for Legal Issues, Public Administration and Human Rights, and since November 2014 also the Ad Hoc Parliamentary Committee on the Judicial System Reform.

As a member of the Government of Albania, Mr. Xhafaj was General Secretary of the Council of Ministers from 1997 to 1999, as well as Minister for Territorial Regulation and Tourism in 2002, and Minister of Justice from 2003 to 2005.
