= Credins Bank =

Albanian bank

- Native name: Banka Credins Sh.A.
- Type: Private
- Industry: Banking
- Founded: 2003
- Headquarters: Tirana
- Area served: Albania;Kosovo
- Key people: Maltin Korkuti (CEO)
- Products: Retail banking; corporate banking; loans; deposits; payment cards; online banking
- Net income: 2.66 billion ALL (2024)
- Total assets: 347.6 billion ALL (2024)
- Total equity: 24.9 billion ALL (2024)
- Number of employees: 1,168
- Website: bankacredins.com

Credins Bank is an Albanian bank, established in Albania in March 2003 by a group of businessmen as the first private bank with Albanian capital. The head office is located in Tirana.

In 2021, Credins Bank had a market share of 15.88%, making it the second largest bank in Albania.

In June 2026, the bank had a network of 51 branches and 55 ATMs. In December 2025, it was the second largest bank in the country in terms of total assets and the largest in terms of loan portfolio. Since 2020 Credins Bank has expanded in Kosovo.

In November 2017, British-based Amryta Capital LLP bought a 14.9% stake in the bank.

== History ==
In January 2003, the Bank of Albania announced that an application submitted for the licensing of the proposed Banka Credins sh.a. On 31 March 2003, Credins Bank received Bank of Albania license no. 16, authorising it to conduct banking and financial activity in Albania.

In 2013, the European Bank for Reconstruction and Development provided the bank with €10 million in financing for on-lending to small and medium-sized enterprises (SME's) and for trade-finance activities.

Public company registration states that Santo was general director at the time of the bank's establishment and that he was reappointed to the position on 20 January 2009. Santo remained chief executive officer and director general until he was shot dead in Tirana on 26 June 2014. Following his death, the shareholders' assembly appointed Maltin Korkuti as general director on 17 July 2014.

In 2017, the Bank of Albania approved UK-based Amryta Capital LLP's acquisition of a 14.9% shareholding interest in Credins Bank through the purchase of BFSE Holding B.V.'s shares for an undisclosed sum.
