= Milena Harito =

Albanian politician (born 1966)

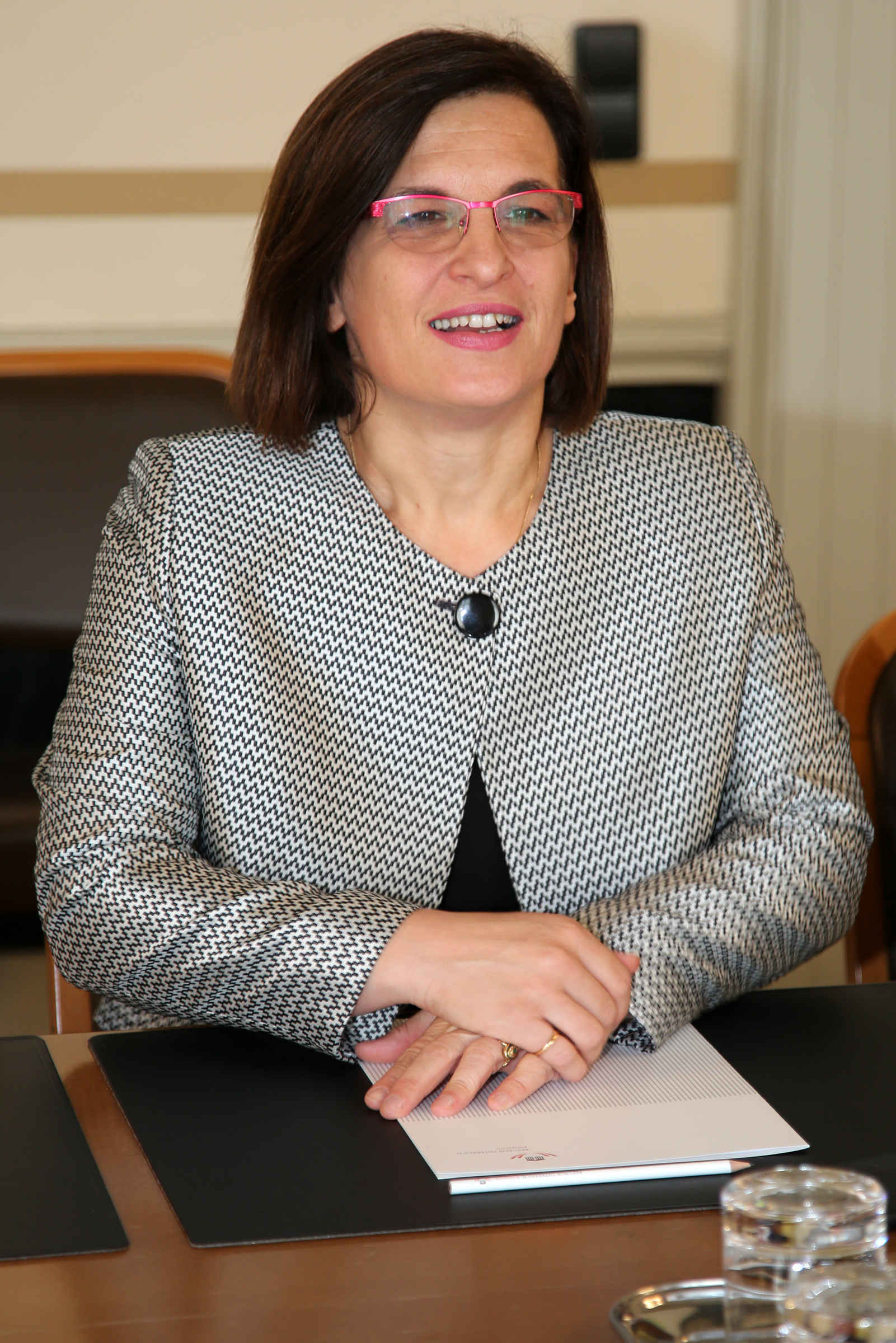

Minister of Innovation and Public Administration
- In office 2013–2017

Milena Harito (born 4 October 1966) is an Albanian politician and member of the Socialist Party of Albania.

She is Minister of Innovation and Public Administration between September 2013 and September 2017. She currently represents Albania in the construction of a regional economic zone for six countries of the Western Balkans.

== Life ==
She graduated in 1989 from the University of Tirana in computer science, and became a research engineer. She left Albania for France in 1991 where she passed a diploma of specialized graduate studies in communication and information technologies in 1993 from Pierre and Marie Curie University. Four years later, she obtained a doctorate.

After her studies, she joined the Centre national d'études des télécommunications (CNET), then various positions with Orange S.A. in France.

She entered politics in Albania in 2012 and in 2013 she was elected to the Parliament of Albania.

Following the parliamentary elections of 23 June 2013, won by the center-left, she was named, on 15 September, the Minister of Innovation and Public Administration in the government of Socialist Prime Minister Edi Rama.

She led out several reforms, such as the recruitment and career of civil servants, one of the conditions of the process of integration into the European Union (EU). A partnership with the National School of Administration (ENA) has helped strengthen the Albanian Academy of Public Administration (ASPA).

== Awards ==
- (2017) Knight of the National Order of Merit (France)
