= Edi Rama =

Prime Minister of Albania since 2013

- Rama in 2025

33rd Prime Minister of Albania
- Incumbent
- Assumed office 11 September 2013
- President: Bujar Nishani; Ilir Meta; Bajram Begaj
- Deputy: See list: Niko Peleshi; Ledina Mandia; Senida Mesi; Erion Braçe; Arben Ahmetaj; Belinda Balluku; Albana Koçiu
- Preceded by: Sali Berisha

Chairman of the Socialist Party of Albania
- Incumbent
- Assumed office 10 October 2005
- Preceded by: Fatos Nano
Other political offices
Chairperson-in-Office of the Organization for Security and Co-operation in Europe
In office 1 January 2020 – 1 January 2021
Preceded by	Miroslav Lajčák
Succeeded by	Ann Linde
40th Mayor of Tirana
In office 11 October 2000 – 25 July 2011
Preceded by	Albert Brojka
Succeeded by	Lulzim Basha
40th Minister of Foreign Affairs
In office 21 January 2019 – 31 December 2020 Serving with Gent Cakaj
Prime Minister	Himself
Preceded by	Ditmir Bushati
Succeeded by	Olta Xhaçka
22nd Minister of Culture, Youth and Sports
In office 2 October 1998 – 26 October 2000
Prime Minister	Pandeli Majko; Ilir Meta
Preceded by	Arta Dade
Succeeded by	Esmeralda Uruçi

Personal details
- Born: Edvin Kristaq Rama; 4 July 1964 (age 62) Tirana, PR Albania
- Party: Socialist
- Spouses: Matilda Makoçi (m. 1986; div. 1991) Linda Basha (m. 2010)
- Children: 2
- Parents: Kristaq Rama (father); Aneta Rama (mother)
- Relatives: Olsi Rama (brother); Zef Kolombi (granduncle); Spiro Koleka (great-granduncle)
- Education: Academy of Arts
- Website: ps.al/familja-jone kryeministria
- Basketball career

Personal information
- Listed height: 6 ft 7 in (2.01 m)

Career information
- High school: Jordan Misja Artistic Lyceum
- College: Tirana University of Arts

Career history
- Dinamo Tirana
- Albania national team

Edvin Kristaq "Edi" Rama (born 4 July 1964) is an Albanian politician, artist, writer, and former professional basketball player who has served as prime minister of Albania since 2013 and as chairman of the Socialist Party of Albania since 2005. He was the Minister of Culture, Youth and Sports from 1998 to 2000 and the Mayor of Tirana from 2000 to 2011.

A coalition of centre-left parties led by Rama in the 2013 parliamentary election defeated the incumbent centre-right coalition led by Sali Berisha of the Democratic Party of Albania. Rama was appointed prime minister for additional terms following parliamentary elections in 2017, 2021, and 2025.

Rama is the only Albanian prime minister to have won four consecutive terms. During Rama's tenure, Albania has seen economic growth but also democratic backsliding, with various sources describing his rule as autocratic. Albania has also continued to suffer from increased emigration.

Rama was one of the initiators of Open Balkan, an economic zone of the Western Balkan countries intended to guarantee the "Four Freedoms".

== Early life and career ==
Edvin Kristaq Rama was born on 4 July 1964 in Tirana, he is the first of two children of Kristaq (1932–1998) and Aneta Rama (née Koleka; 1938–2020). His father was a well-known sculptor from Durrës who created numerous statues during the communist era in Albania and had close ties to the communist regime; he was a signatory to the 1988 death sentence of opposition poet Havzi Nela. Edi's great-grandfather, also named Kristaq Rama, was an intellectual who advocated for Albanian independence and schools, and he originated from Berat before later relocating to Durrës. Other ancestors from his paternal side come from the southeastern village of Dardhë, now part of Korçë. His mother, hailing from the southwestern village of Vuno, was a graduate of medicine and a great-niece of Spiro Koleka, a member of the Politburo during the communist years. Rama states that the Koleka family, going back some centuries, is of northern Mirditor origin, and that the surname was derived from Kol Leka.

Rama started painting early in his childhood. During his teenage years, his talent was noticed by two influential Albanian painters of the time, Edi Hila and Danish Jukniu. They encouraged Rama to further develop his painting skills in a professional context. He attended and graduated from the Jordan Misja Artistic Lyceum, an art school in Tirana. As a teenager, Rama played professional basketball for Dinamo Tirana and was also part of the Albania national basketball team. and was also an interpreter for Italian club Scavolini Libertas when they played against Partizani Tirana in 1988 In 1982, he enrolled in the Academy of Arts in Tirana. After graduating, Rama started working as an instructor at the Academy of Arts. During this time, he organized several open student meetings, during which the Albanian communist government was publicly criticized. Essays from those meetings were collected in the book Refleksione, which Rama published together with publicist Ardian Klosi in 1992.

Shortly before the fall of communism in Albania, Rama attempted several times to get involved with the incipient fight for democracy. He tried to influence student protests and become part of the newly created Democratic Party of Albania but soon left after a quarrel over ideological matters with Sali Berisha. In 1994, Rama moved to France, and tried to begin a career as a painter. He and his former student, Anri Sala, exhibited their works in several art galleries. On 27 November 2002, Rama officially changed his first name to Edi.

== Political career ==
During one of his trips back to Albania in January 1997, Rama suffered a physical assault. While the perpetrators were never found, there were concerns over the involvement of the State Secret Service (SHIK) given Rama's outspoken criticism towards the Albanian government.

In 1998, while in Albania for the funeral of his father, Rama was offered a cabinet position by then-Prime Minister of Albania Fatos Nano. Later that year he was appointed Minister of Culture, Youth and Sports. As a Minister, Rama immediately became known for his extravagance, including his unique colorful dressing style. His innovative cultural projects, coupled with his unusual clothing and rebellious political style, helped him attract support.

=== Mayor of Tirana (2000–2011) ===
In October 2000, the Socialist Party of Albania endorsed Rama in the election for Mayor of Tirana. The Democratic Party nominee was Besnik Mustafaj, a writer and diplomat. Rama won 57% of the vote, and was sworn in as mayor. After taking office, he undertook a radical campaign of bulldozing hundreds of illegal constructions and restoring many areas near Tirana's center and Lanë River.

Rama began an initiative in 2004 to repaint Tirana's degrading Hoxha-era apartment blocks using more vibrant colors. The repainting helped transform the aesthetics of areas dominated by the Soviet-style buildings. Rama was awarded the inaugural World Mayor Prize in 2004. The award committee stated, "Edi Rama is the man who changed a whole city. Now there is a new Tirana, colored, happy, with a new and improved infrastructure and cultural life".

As mayor he compiled the Tirana City Master Plan including the Skanderbeg Square project. He planted thousands of new trees, making Tirana a much more environment-friendly city. Rama also expanded the existing roads and paved new ones, improving mobility. According to a UNDP report Rama played a critical role in the modernization of the local government, empowering municipalities and giving them, for the first time real power to impact the life of their communities.

Rama was reelected Mayor of Tirana by defeating Democratic Party candidates Spartak Ngjela, a former attorney, in 2003, and Sokol Olldashi in 2007. In 2011, Rama decided to run for a fourth term in office. His opponent, Lulzim Basha was a member of Prime Minister Sali Berisha's cabinet. Rama's reelection bid failed in a hotly contested election, after a court ruling decided hundreds of ballots mistakenly cast in the wrong ballot boxes were valid. The initial count saw Rama ahead by 10 votes. With all ballots counted Lulzim Basha won the race by 81 votes. Rama appealed the court's decision at the Electoral College and demanded the reinstatement of the initial tally. Rama's appeals were rejected, and Basha was sworn in as the new Mayor of Tirana. Rama and the Socialist Party criticized the judges involved in the court ruling.

=== Leader of the opposition (2005–2013) ===
Having previously run as an independent in 2000, Rama registered as a Socialist in 2003. Later that year he announced a bid for the chairmanship of the Party. He and Rexhep Meidani, former President, ran against the incumbent, Fatos Nano. Rama's bid failed to gain sufficient support from the Assembly delegates. He received 41 votes, Rexhep Meidani received 61, while Fatos Nano was reelected with 456 votes.

After the center-left coalition lost in the 2005 parliamentary election, Fatos Nano resigned as Chairman of the Socialist Party. In the subsequent election for the chairmanship of the Party, Rama defeated Rexhep Meidani 297-151 and became the Chairman of the Socialist Party.

Capitalising on Rama's popularity as a mayor, the Socialist Party of Albania regained some of its appeal. Rama replaced many of the party's influential leaders with younger loyalists. In his earlier attempts to regain control in the Parliament, he tried to frame himself as a political outsider. Inspired by the progressive policies of Tony Blair's "New Labour" and Anthony Giddens "Third Way", his political platform called for a "third direction beyond the traditional right and left".

As the minority leader, Rama threw his support behind a set of constitutional amendments introduced in the Parliament during the summer of 2008. They changed Albania's election law from a majoritarian representation with a proportional adjustment into a party-list proportional representation as well as curtailed Presidential powers. Despite criticism and protests from President Bamir Topi and MPs from the Socialist Movement for Integration and other smaller political parties, the amendments were passed in the Parliament with a super-majority.

Rama's reelection as mayor in 2007 was greatly helped by the Socialist Movement for Integration's endorsement of his candidacy. Seeing the 2008 constitutional amendments voted by Rama's SPA as a serious threat to their existence in Albanian politics, Ilir Meta and the SMI did not join Rama in a pre-electoral coalition for the 2009 parliamentary election. The Socialist Party led by Rama were only able to win 66 seats in the Parliament. Incumbent prime minister Berisha's Democratic Party won 70 seats, while the remaining 4 seats went to Ilir Meta's Socialist Movement for Integration. Demands by Rama and the Socialists for a recount in the district of Fier were rejected by courts amidst criticism about the judge's impartiality. Eventually, all four newly elected SMI members of the parliament voted support for Prime Minister Berisha's Democrats.

The 2009 election's narrow defeat prompted Rama to continue his mandate as chairman of the Socialist Party. The Socialist Party opted for a hardcore dispute of the newly elected government by boycotting parliamentary debates for months and staging a hunger strike to prompt for domestic and foreign attention to the situation. The heated political debate surrounding the 2009 election has been pointed out as one reason for Albania's failed bid at gaining official candidate status in accession talks with the EU.

In January 2011, a recorded videotape showed Deputy Prime Minister Ilir Meta negotiating informal pay-to-play fees with Dritan Prifti, Minister for the Economy, Commerce and Energy. On 21 January 2011, clashes broke out between police and protesters in an anti-government rally in front of the Government building in Tirana. Four people were shot dead by government special forces. The EU issued a statement to Albanian politicians, warning both sides to refrain from violence.

== Prime Minister of Albania (2013–present) ==
In 2013, the Socialist Party of Rama led the coalition of center-left parties (that included his former opponents, the SMI) into a landslide victory in the parliamentary election, defeating the center-right coalition led by Prime Minister Sali Berisha. His platform, nicknamed "Renaissance" was based on four pillars: European integration, economic revitalisation, restoration of the public order and democratisation of the state institutions. Since September 2013, Rama has been serving as the Prime Minister of Albania.

=== Policies as Prime Minister ===
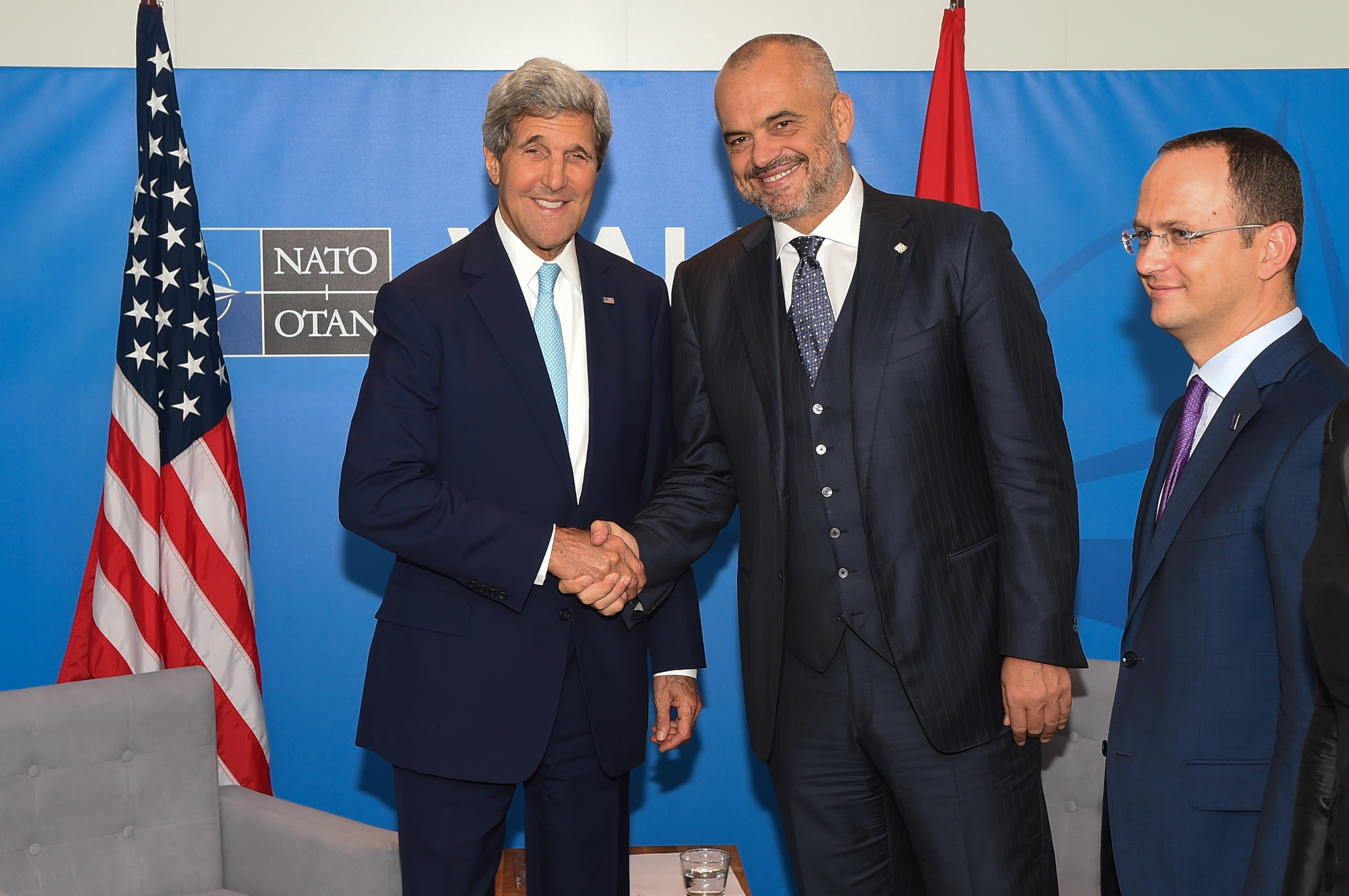
U.S. Secretary of State John Kerry and Rama during the 2014 Wales NATO summit in Newport, Wales

On 11 September 2013, Rama began serving as the 33rd Prime Minister of Albania. During the electoral campaign, Rama stated that the return of public order was his number one priority. In 2013, the Albanian Police was able to cover actively only 55% of the territory. The Government invested heavily in modernizing, training, and improving the financial benefits of the police force. The police earned international acclaim when, in 2014 undertook a highly successful operation on Lazarat, a remote village in the south of the country, known for the production of narcotics.

Rama has been committed to restructuring Albania's judicial system, which was considered one of the most corrupt and ineffective judicial systems in Europe at that time. In 2016, the Parliament approved the vetting law. Based on this law, any judge or prosecutor who cannot explain his source of wealth or former dubious verdicts will be disqualified for life. In November 2016, the European Union stated that a successful implementation of vetting law remains the sole criterion to fulfill before opening accession talks.

Another key reform was in the energy sector, left on the brink of bankruptcy from a previous failed privatisation effort. His government successfully enforced the payment of billions of unpaid bills and heavily invested in the modernization of the obsolete power distribution network. The economic growth, from 0.5% in 2013, accelerated to 3.5% in 2016 and exceeded 4% during 2017. Unemployment was reduced steadily, thanks to 183,000 new jobs created in his first mandate, through a war against informality and opening of new businesses. Furthermore, with 11.5% in 2019, Albania had the 5th lowest unemployment rate in the Balkans.

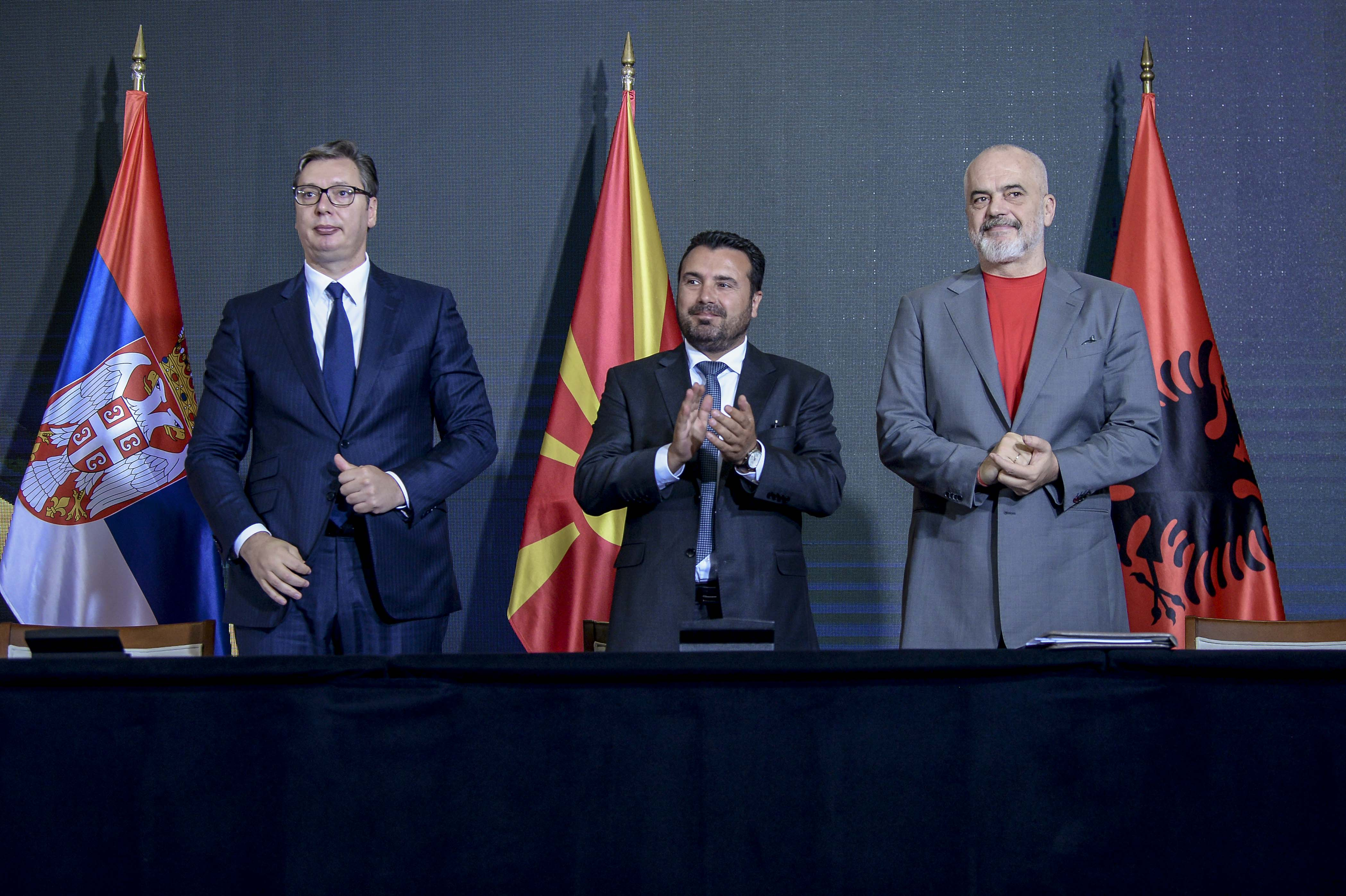
Serbian President Aleksandar Vučić, Macedonian Prime Minister Zoran Zaev, and Rama stand at the opening of the Open Balkan, 29 July 2021

Other important reforms include the administrative reform, the social welfare and pension system reform, and the reform in higher education. Internationally, Rama is pursuing a historical reconciliation policy between Albanians and Serbs, and his visit to Belgrade in 2014, was the first visit of an Albanian Prime Minister to Serbia in over 70 years. In a second visit, during the Economic Forum of Nis, Rama compared the Albanian and Serbian reconciliation process with the historical reconciliation between the French and Germans after World War II. Rama is also a key supporter of the Berlin Process, an intergovernmental platform of cooperation between the European Union and Western Balkans countries.

The Socialist Party, led by Rama, participated in the 2017 Albanian parliamentary election, held on 25 June 2017. One day later, partial results suggested that the Socialist Party had won a majority. Which so happened.

Rama and Ramush Haradinaj, then Prime Minister of Kosovo, had a clash in late 2019 due to different views on the Open Balkan initiative. Rama stated that Haradinaj "lies due to ignorance or on purpose." In 2020, Rama filed a lawsuit for defamation against Haradinaj.

In 2023, the minimum wage was increased to 40,000ALL (€404) per month, an increase from that of 24,000ALL in 2017. Throughout 2024 and 2025, Rama's government increased wages in the public administration, with the average gross salary in the public administration reaching €1040.

In 2024, Rama announced plans to establish a new European microstate called the Sovereign State of the Bektashi Order enclaved within Tirana. The new country is planned to serve as the headquarters of the Bektashi Order, a Sufi Islamic order led by Baba Mondi.

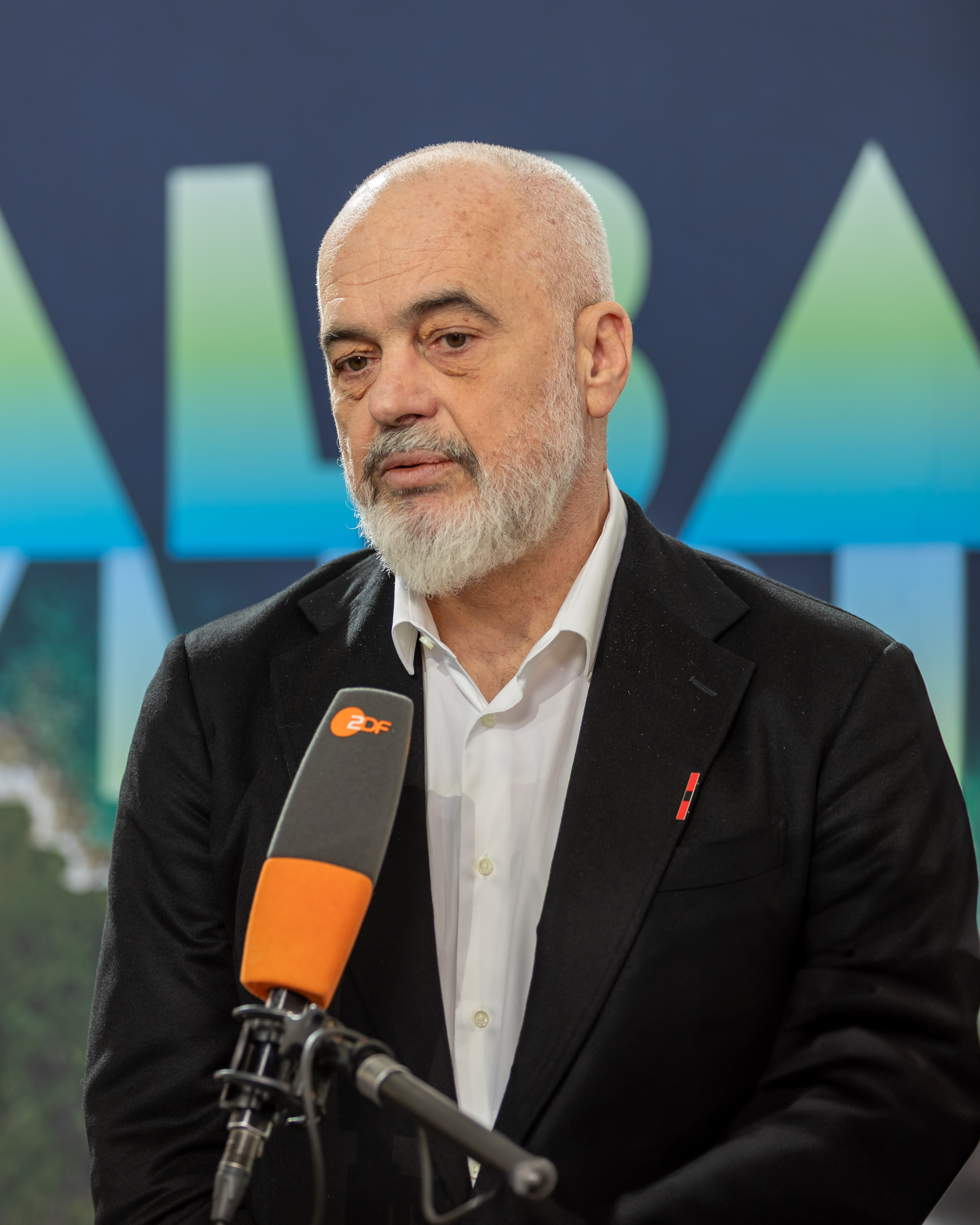
Rama at a 2025 press conference

In 2025, Rama's government appointed an AI-generated character named Diella as the country's minister in charge of overseeing public tenders as part of measures aimed at fighting corruption. Later in 2025, Rama announced that Diella was "pregnant" with 83 AI assistants intended to aid Socialist Party MPs.

== Domestic policy ==
Rama has adopted a neo-liberal economic policy. It reduces public spending and promotes public-private partnerships in most sectors (tourism, higher education, health, public works, culture). The International Monetary Fund (IMF), traditionally favorable to these policies, however, considered that the Albanian government was proceeding too quickly with privatisation and exposed the country to "significant fiscal risks". Economic growth rates approached 4 percent in 2017 and 2018, the unemployment rate fell from 17.5 percent in 2014 to 11.5 percent in 2020. According to him, the improvement in the economic situation can be explained by the political stability of the country: "We are a country without a Senate, without unions, without a radical left and without comedians who play politics." Nevertheless, salaries remain low and emigration has accelerated since 2014.

During Rama’s first term, Albania experienced a major expansion of cannabis cultivation and trafficking, peaking around 2016–2017. According to estimates by Italian customs, 753,000 cannabis plants were destroyed in 2016, compared to 46,000 in 2014. Such destruction would have affected only 10 percent of the cultivated area. The Minister of the Interior, Saimir Tahiri (in office from 2013 to 2017), has himself been accused (and sentenced) for his involvement in drug trafficking. In 2018, Rama adopted a law, welcomed by the European Union, providing for competition between universities and their openness to the market. Increases in tuition fees have caused discontent among students.

=== 2019 Albanian earthquake ===
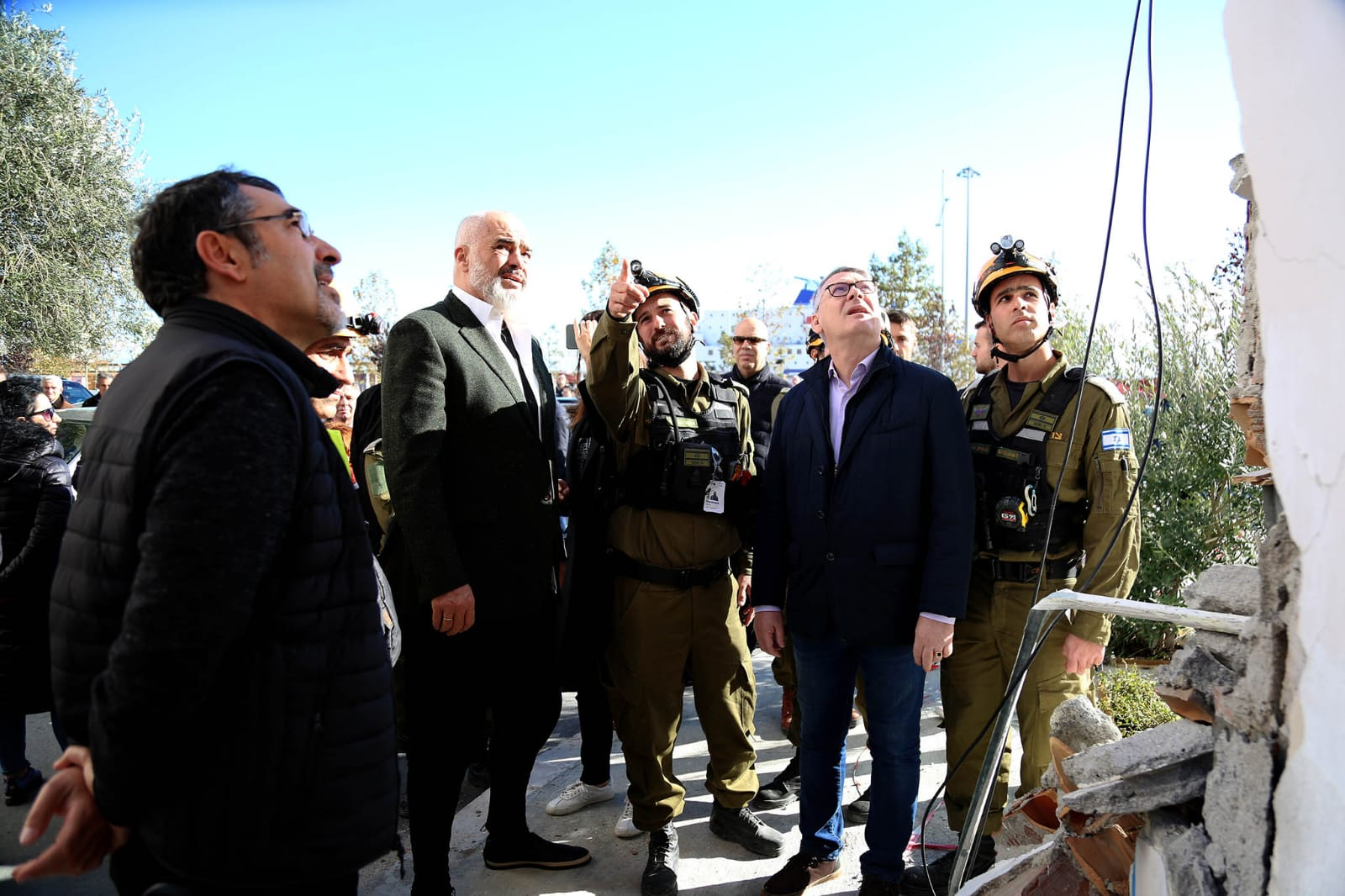
Rama surveying earthquake damage with the Israel Defense Forces Aid Mission in 2019

On 26 November 2019, an earthquake struck Albania, and subsequently, the country's parliament granted Rama state of emergency powers to deal with the aftermath. Rama visited the earthquake epicentre to oversee the situation and damage, whereas political rivalries between him, Meta, and Basha were sidelined as they became involved in relief efforts. On 30 November, Rama ended the search and rescue operation, and the next day, he attended the first funeral for the deceased.

Rama reconfigured the state budget for 2020 to manage the post-earthquake situation to provide funds for the construction of homes. Rama called for additional expert assistance and monetary aid geared toward recovery from the international community, stating that Albania lacks the capacity "to do this (reconstruction) alone."

In mid-December 2019, Rama faced criticism from several non-governmental organisations, human rights organisations, and parts of the media for misusing the situation to pass controversial legislation after he sought a three-month extension of his state of emergency powers from parliament. Rama assembled and tasked a group of fundraisers to manage donations from the Albanian diaspora and guarantee oversight of their use. Rama contacted and held discussions with several influential world leaders and countries, requesting assistance and the creation of an international donors' conference. On 8 December, Rama personally attended a Turkish donors conference for Albania that was organised and attended by President Erdogan. In January 2020, Rama publicised preliminary figures of damage caused by the earthquake, which totaled more than €1 billion.

=== Cabinet ===
==== 1st Cabinet ====
The 1st Cabinet of Rama was sworn in by President Bujar Nishani on 11 September 2013, becoming the 8th Cabinet of the Albanian Republic, since the collapse of communism in Albania. The Cabinet is composed of 21 members, with fifteen coming from the Socialist Party, six from the Socialist Movement for Integration. The Cabinet is also the first in which the number of female ministers is equal to the number of male ministers, excluding the Prime Minister.

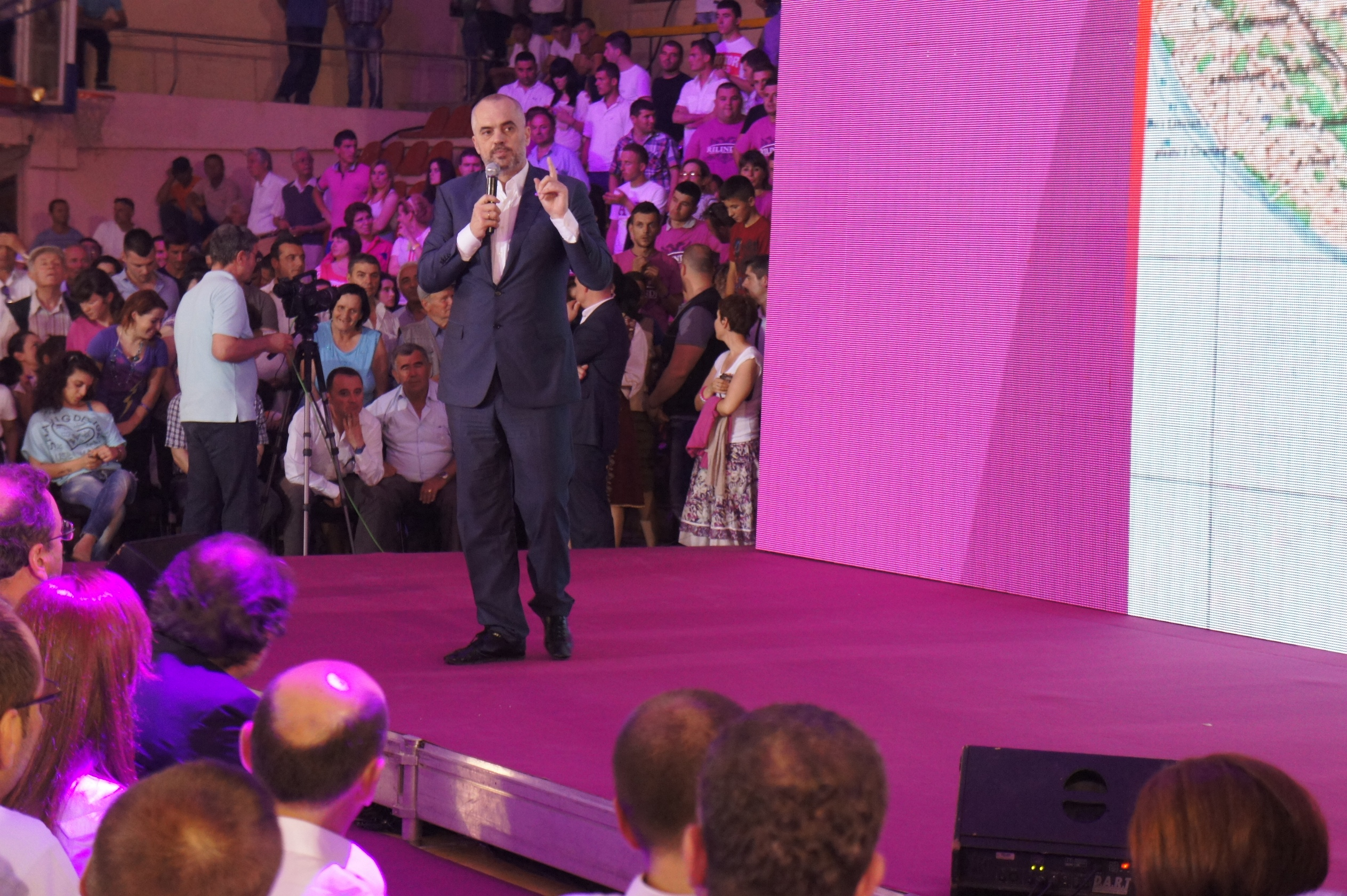
Rama at a political campaign rally in Vlore, 18 May 2013

Cabinet	Name	Party	Term
Prime Minister	Edi Rama	Socialist Party	(2013–)
Deputy Prime Minister	Niko Peleshi	Socialist Party	(2013–2017)
Minister of Defence	Mimi Kodheli	Socialist Party	(2013–2017)
Minister of the Interior	Saimir Tahiri	Socialist Party	(2013–2017)
Minister of Foreign Affairs	Ditmir Bushati	Socialist Party	(2013–2019)
Minister of Justice	Nasip Naço	Socialist Party	(2013–2017)
Minister of European Integration	Klajda Gjosha	Socialist Movement for Integration	(2013–2017)
Minister of Economic Development	Milva Ekonomi	Socialist Party	(2013–2017)
Minister of Energy and Industry	Damian Gjiknuri	Socialist Party	(2013–2017)
Minister of Transportation and Infrastructure	Sokol Dervishaj	Socialist Movement for Integration	(2013–2017)
Minister of Urban Development	Eglantina Gjermeni	Socialist Party	(2013–2017)
Minister of Agriculture	Edmond Panariti	Socialist Movement for Integration	(2013–2017)
Minister of Health	Arben Beqiri	Socialist Party	(2013–2017)
Minister of Education	Lindita Nikolla	Socialist Party	(2013–2017)
Minister of Social Welfare and Youth	Blendi Klosi	Socialist Party	(2015–2017)
Minister of Culture	Mirela Kumbaro	Socialist Party	(2013–2019)
Minister of Environment	Lefter Koka	Socialist Movement for Integration	(2013–2017)
Minister of Innovation and Public Administration	Milena Harito	Socialist Party	(2013–2017)
Minister of Relations with Parliament	Ermonela Felaj	Socialist Party	(2013–2017)
Minister of Local Governance	Eduard Shalsi	Socialist Party	(2013–2017)

==== 2nd Cabinet ====
The 2nd Cabinet of Rama was sworn in by President Ilir Meta in September 2017, becoming the 9th Cabinet of the Albanian Republic, since the collapse of communism in Albania. The Cabinet is composed of 15 members, coming all from the Socialist Party. The Cabinet is also the second in which the number of female ministers is equal to the number of male ministers, excluding the Prime Minister.

Cabinet	Name	Party	Term
Prime Minister	Edi Rama	Socialist Party	(2013–)
Deputy Prime Minister	Senida Mesi	Socialist Party	(2017–2019)
Minister of Defence	Olta Xhaçka	Socialist Party	(2017–2020)
Minister of the Interior	Fatmir Xhafaj; Dritan Demiraj; Fatmir Xhafaj (acting); Sandër Lleshaj	Socialist Party	(2017) (2017) (2017–2018) (2018–2020)
Minister for Europe and Foreign Affairs	Ditmir Bushati; Edi Rama	Socialist Party	(2013–2019) (2019–)
Minister of Justice	Etilda Gjonaj	Socialist Party	(2017–2021)
Minister of Culture	Mirela Kumbaro	Socialist Party	(2013–)
Minister of Finance and Economy	Arben Ahmetaj	Socialist Party	(2017–2019)
Minister of Education, Sports and Youth	Lindita Nikolla; Besa Shahini	Socialist Party	(2017–2019) (2019–)
Minister of Health and Social Care	Ogerta Manastirliu	Socialist Party	(2017–)
Minister of Infrastructure and Energy	Damian Gjiknuri; Belinda Balluku	Socialist Party	(2017–2019) (2019–)
Minister of Agriculture and Rural Development	Niko Peleshi; Bledar Çuçi	Socialist Party	(2017–2019) (2019–)
Minister of Tourism and Environment	Blendi Klosi	Socialist Party	(2017–2021)
Minister of State for Albanian Diaspora	Pandeli Majko	Socialist Party	(2017–2021)
Minister of State for Entrepreneurs	Sonila Qato	Socialist Party	(2017–)

In June 2026, Rama faced criticism and calls to resign after supporting efforts for a resort on Sazan Island and neighboring areas which were protected under the country's environmental laws. The resort was backed by foreign investors including Jared Kushner, the son-in-law of US President Donald Trump. His efforts caused protests in the country and around the world, even nicknamed the Flamingo Revolution.

=== Foreign policy ===
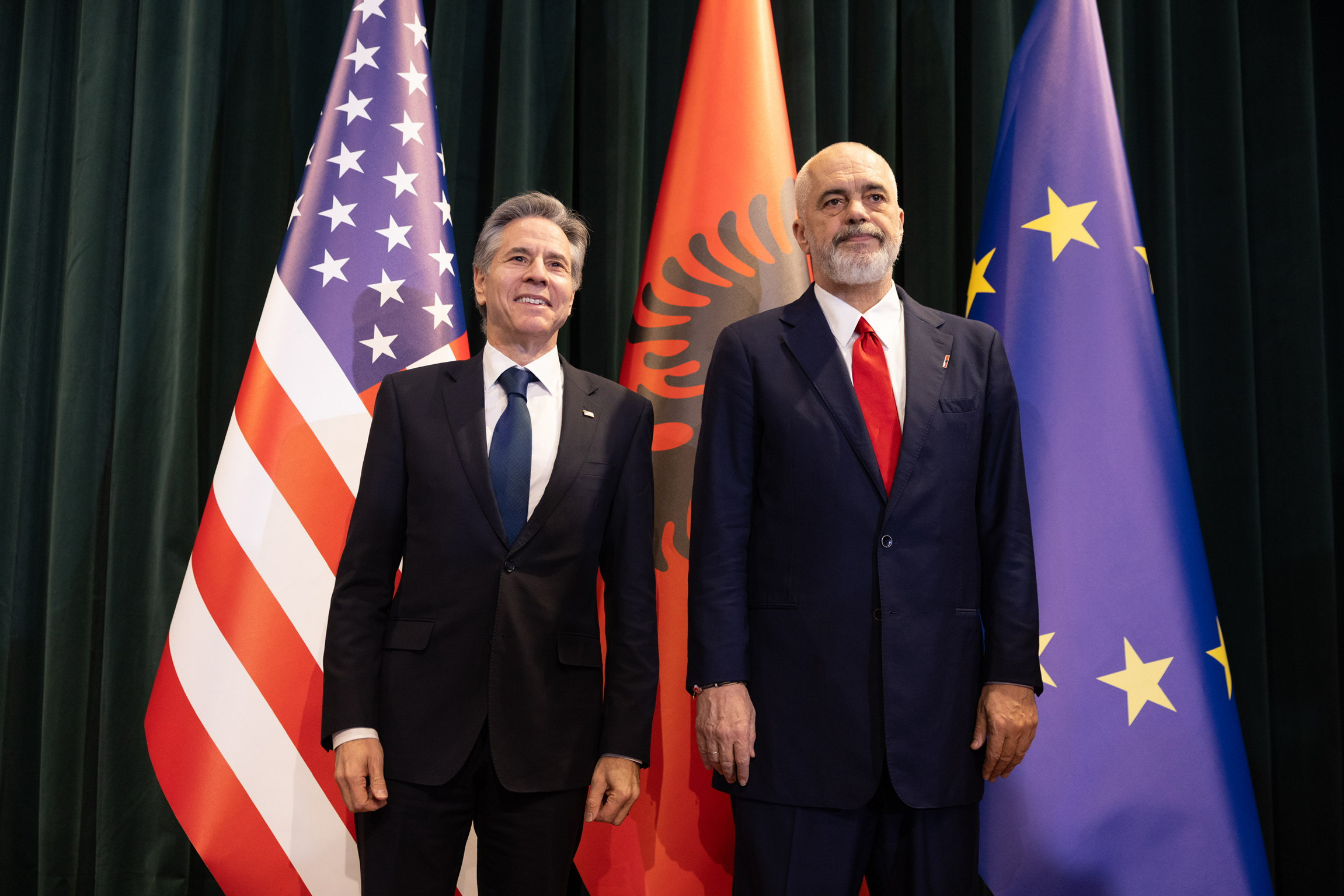
Rama alongside U.S. Secretary of State Antony Blinken, 15 February 2024

On several occasions, Rama has stated that the European Union needs to accelerate the integration process of the Western Balkans, considering it the only way to subdue the dangerous fractions in the region, preventing a possible eruption of violence, like the one that hammered the region in the 1990s. Rama has also denounced the rising Russian influence in the region as destabilising.

Rama views Turkey as an important strategic partner and since 2013, he has developed a good personal relationship with Turkish President Recep Tayyip Erdoğan. In May 2016, Rama attended the wedding of Erdogan's daughter and Erdogan's presidential inauguration in 2018, whereas Erdogan endorsed him in mid-2017 for Albania's parliamentary elections. Rama has strengthened ties with Turkey, namely with the Erdogan government despite possible and growing contradictions with his pro-European enlargement stance. Rama describes Erdoğan as a "friend of Albania and strategic ally". At his request, he had schools linked to the Gülen movement closed, which he went so far as to describe as a 'terrorist organization'.

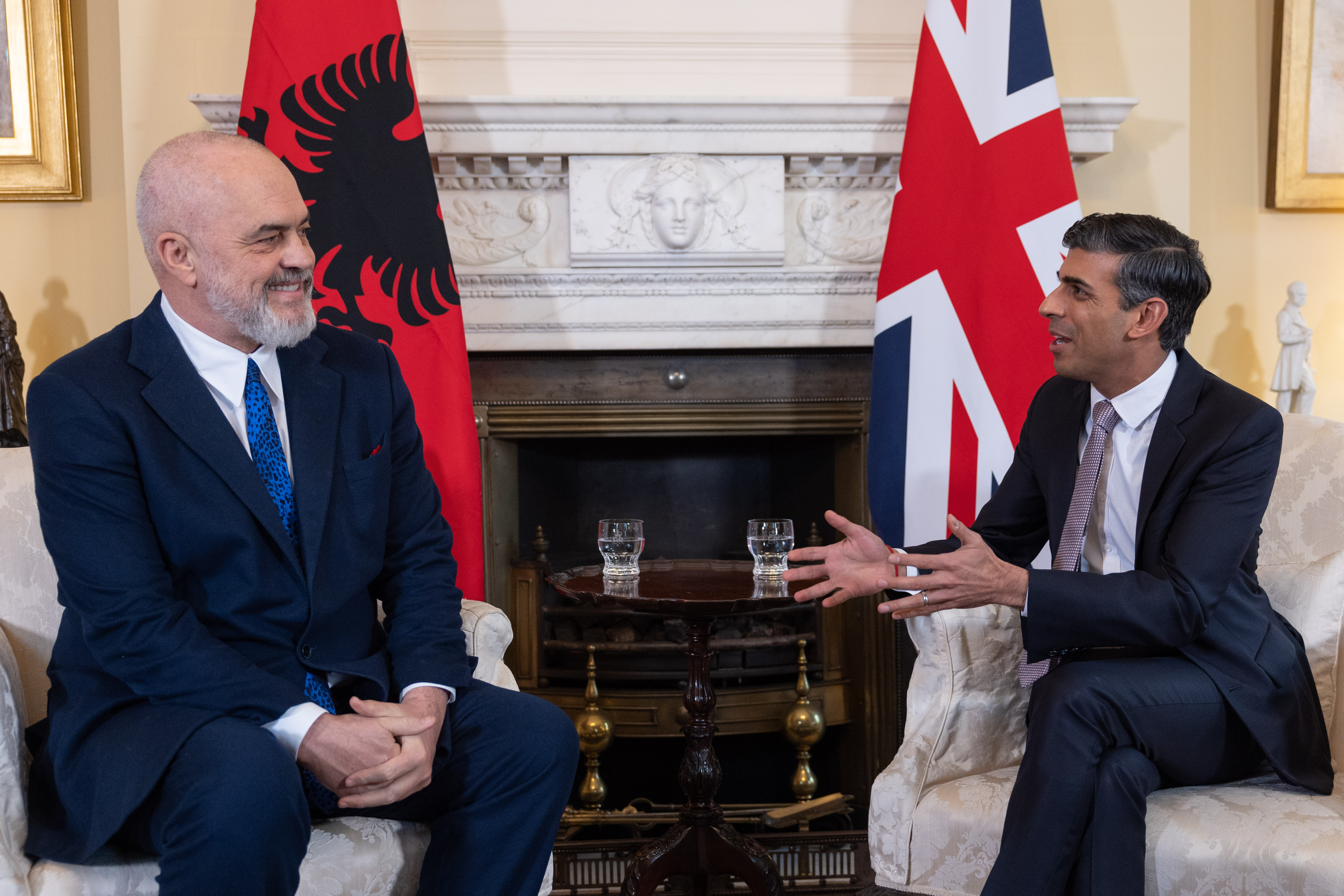
Rama and British Prime Minister Rishi Sunak, 23 March 2023

Rama has had a diverse agenda of high-level meetings. Since 2013, he has frequently met with German Chancellor Angela Merkel, American President Barack Obama, French President Francois Hollande, British Prime Minister David Cameron, Chinese Prime Minister Li Keqiang, Austrian Foreign Minister Sebastian Kurz, Pope Francis, and other high-ranking diplomats. Rama, speaking in Israel in 2015, said that Albania was "proud to have been a country where no Jew was released to the Nazis, and where there are incredible stories of Muslim families who protected Jewish families," and he and Israeli Prime Minister Benjamin Netanyahu signed a joint declaration of friendship and a medical research cooperation agreement.

On 10 October 2019, together with Aleksandar Vučić, President of Serbia, and Zoran Zaev, Prime Minister of North Macedonia, Rama signed the so-called Mini Schengen deal on regional economic cooperation, including on the free movement of goods, capital, services, and labour between their three countries, while they await progress on EU enlargement. A month later, the leaders presented a set of proposals to achieve the "four freedoms" and the first steps towards them, including the possibility to the open border area. In December, the three leaders also met with Milo Đukanović, President of Montenegro, opening the possibility for the country to join the zone. In 2024, Rama said that Albania was aiming to join the EU by 2030.

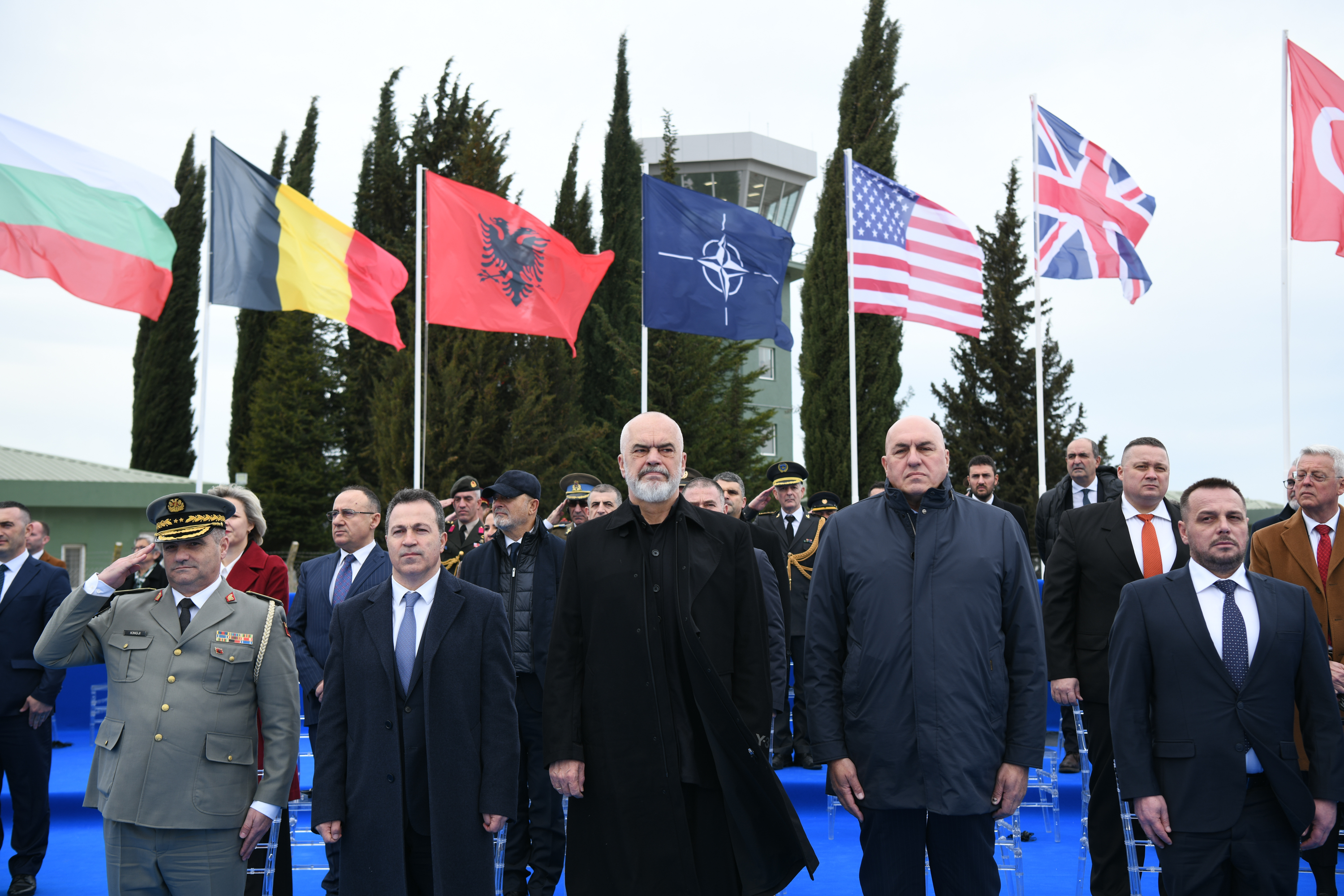
Rama at the NATO Air Base Kuçova in Albania, 4 March 2024

In April 2025, Rama visited Israel and expressed support for Israel's war in the Gaza Strip, saying that "Hamas are the Nazis of the new century. And history has shown that with Nazis, there is no peace and there is no compromise." There was a demonstration in Tirana against his visit to Israel. In June 2025, he announced his support for Israeli strikes on Iran, "to prevent the theocratic regime in Tehran from ever possessing nuclear weapons."

== Artist and writer ==
=== Exhibitions ===
- City Art Gallery, Corfu, Greece (1990)
- National Art Gallery in Tirana, Albania (1992)
- Jano Gallery in New York City (1993)
- Place de Médiathèque in France (1995)
- Acud in Berlin (1993)
- São Paulo in Brazil (1994)
- Israel (1995)
- Gallery XXI in Albania (1999)
- Venice Biennial (2014)
- Marian Goodman Gallery in New York City (2016)

Rama is an active painter and has had several personal painting exhibitions.

In 2014 and 2017, Rama held an exhibit in the Venice Biennial. In 2016, a collection of his works were exhibited in the Marian Goodman Gallery in New York City.

=== Publications ===
- Rama, Edi; Klosi, Ardian (1991). Refleksione.
- Rama, Edi (1993). Etërit, Seksi dhe Krenaria Kombtare.
- Rama, Edi (2009). Edi Rama. Paintings
- Rama, Edi (2011). Kurban. Tirana: Dudaj.

Rama is also an active writer. In 1992, while a professor at the Academy of Arts of Albania, Rama published a book with various notes together with publicist Ardian Klosi entitled Refleksione (Reflections). In 2009, Rama published a collection of personal notes and paintings in a book entitled Edi Rama. In November 2011, Rama published a reflection book on his years as mayor of Tirana entitled Kurban.

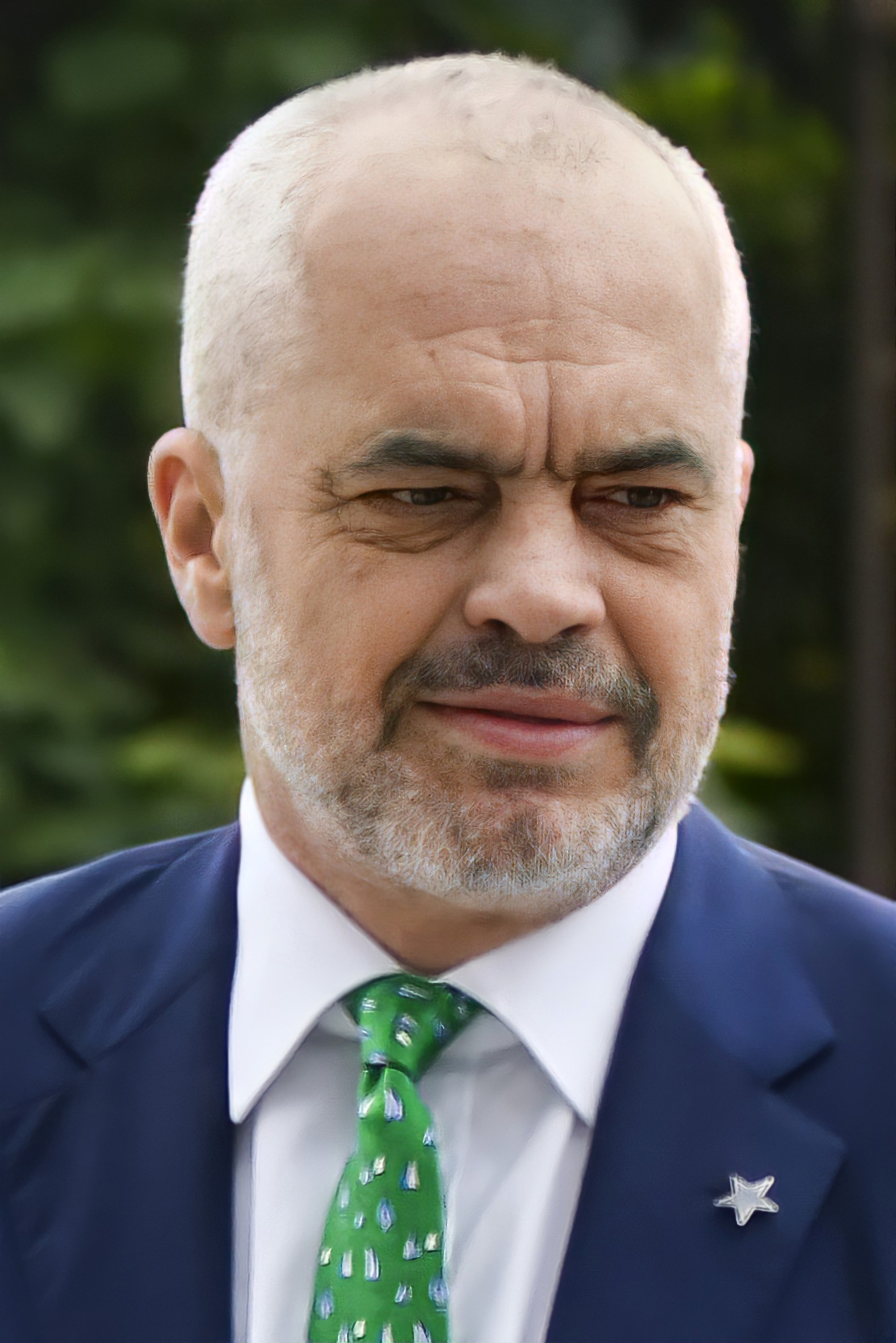
Rama in 2018

== Personal life ==
Rama was baptized as Catholic and identifies as Catholic. Regarding his religious beliefs at present, Rama has declared himself an agnostic stating that "I do not practice any faith other than to the self and other people, but I don't believe that the existence or non-existence of God is a matter that can ever be resolved by mortals."

Rama married actress Matilda Makoçi. The couple divorced in 1991. Rama has a son from his first marriage, Gregor, who is a cancer survivor. Rama's daughter-in-law was one of the 51 fatalities in the 2019 Albania earthquake. Since 2010, Rama has been married to Linda Rama (née Basha), an Albanian economist (Doctor of Economics), researcher, university lecturer, and advocate for women's and children's rights. Together they have a son born in 2014, named Zaho.

Aside from his native Albanian, Rama is fluent in English, French, and Italian.

Rama is a supporter of the sports teams FK Partizani and Juventus. His younger brother, Olsi Rama, is the sporting director of Partizani Tirana.

Rama leads a podcast called Flasim ('Speaking'). Guests include Ermonela Jaho and Ogerta Manastirliu.

== Controversies ==
=== Involvement in electoral fraud ===
In a series of 16 audio tapes published online by the German tabloid Bild, Rama and his cabinet members were recorded in conversations with police and members of organized crime ahead of the 2017 Parliamentary elections. In one of the tapes Rama is recorded in a conversation with Arben Keshi, a local police official, asking if "the objective had been met". In another recording, cabinet member Damian Gjiknuri was heard offering Keshi to send "a van of problematic guys" who "should not be too exposed" but may be needed "just in case" for the election. In other tapes, former Socialist MPs were recorded giving instructions to Keshi and other local officials on bribing constituents with cash and intimidating them with threats. In other tapes published by Bild, former mayor of Durrës Vangjush Dako, appointed by SP was heard in conversations with members of drug trafficking and organized crime in connection to the 2017 elections.

=== Controversial media law ===
In December 2019, the government led by Rama, proposed changes in two laws regarding communications and information services in Albania, with focus on regulating the online media market, forcing them to register and giving authority to institutions controlled by the Parliament to fine online medias and journalists and block their contents.

Also known as the 'anti-defamation' law, it gives to the authority of Audiovisual Media in Albania (AMA) the competences of fining journalists and they can have their cases heard in court only after paying the AMA-imposed fine. Critics say this clause aims to decimate the finances of independent news outlets, whose limited funding would be likely to expire long before a court even hears the case.

Media organizations in Albania protested the changes in the law, considering them as censoring free-speech and expressing their concerns, because the drafted law didn't take in consideration several recommendations made by international actors like the EU Commissioner for Human Rights. The Albanian Ombudsman called the government on not approving the two anti-defamation draft laws, as they do not meet international standards.

The Venice Commission gave its opinion and to its conclusion the proposed media law has a number of flaws to proposed amendments that needs to be changed, in the report the Venice Commission gave a number of recommendations and stated that "Albanian authorities showed willingness to dialogue and addressed their concerns for the protection of freedom of speech". Rama on Twitter praised the recommendations and stated "Grateful to the Venice Commission for their opinion on Anti-defamation! Without losing any further time, we need to address the matter in the Assembly according to the valuable suggestions and guarantee by law everyone's right to be defended against defamation, and the obligation of every news outlet to be identified as a subject to the law."

=== Reporters Without Borders ===
After Albania fell to a historic low in the Reporters Without Borders' annual World Press Freedom Index, Rama criticized the organization's notation. However Pavol Szalai, the head of the European Union and Balkan Desk, noted that the methodology changed from 2020 to 2022 and that Albania had fallen partly due to this and partly due to countries such as Serbia and Montenegro rising.

Rama took to Twitter where he accused the organization of making up "lies" and called the accusations "fantasies". Rama then tweeted: "Journalists victims of police violence in Albania? What a lie! Journalists critical of the government face political attacks? What a fantasy! Ethical self-regulation in the Albanian media? What a mockery! Only the title is missing: We complain about the lack of freedom because we do not know what to do with freedom!" One day after Rama tweeted his denials, RSF reported that he attacked an Albanian reporter who he had previously put on a two-month long embargo.

=== Charles McGonigal ===
In January 2023, Rama was implicated in a U.S. federal indictment concerning former senior FBI official Charles McGonigal. According to the indictment, in September 2017, McGonigal allegedly met with and tried to sway Rama into awarding an oil-drilling license to an Albanian-based company affiliated with McGonigal's business partners. In November 2017, shortly after a meeting with Rama in Albania, McGonigal allegedly informed a United States Department of Justice prosecutor of a potentially new criminal investigation into Nicolas Muzin, a U.S.-based lobbyist who had recently been hired by Rama's political rival, Lulzim Basha. The following month, McGonigal dined with Rama in Washington, D.C., and up until early 2018, received information about Muzin from the Albanian Prime Minister's office.

Rama has denied any wrongdoing.

=== Bektashi state proposal ===
In September 2024, Rama announced plans to create the Sovereign State of the Bektashi Order within the capital city of Tirana to serve as the territory of the Bektashi Order. The plan faced criticism and controversy, with the Muslim Community of Albania calling the plan "a dangerous precedent for the future of the country". Albanians interviewed by Balkan Insight characterized the planned state as a distraction from alleged domestic scandals created by Edi Rama in an attempt to gain favorable news coverage. Besnik Sinani, a research fellow at the Center for Muslim Theology at Tübingen University, said the comparison to Vatican City "does not withstand historical scrutiny" and called the proposal "an unprecedented case of contemporary religious engineering". He further said he believed it would "disrupt the historical arrangements of the relationship between religion and state in Albania".

=== Other controversies ===
A Flamingo Revolution protest in Tirana on 13 June 2026 against the Albanian government's approval of Jared Kushner's luxury real estate projects in the Vjosa–Nartë Protected Landscape.

A photograph of Rama and Barack Obama at a fundraising event in October 2012 was shared by Rama on Facebook and Twitter ahead of Albania's 2013 Parliamentary Election, to imply a relationship with Obama. Rama's ticket to the event was purchased for $80,000 through intermediaries that pled guilty to making foreign contributions in connection with the 2012 U.S. Presidential Election.

At the beginning of December 2021, on board a Lufthansa plane headed to Detroit from Frankfurt, Rama refused to wear a mask as required by the company's COVID-safety guidelines. After Rama vehemently refused, the airplane crew asked the captain to persuade the prime minister to comply with the rules as with all the other passengers. However, Rama refused any proposal and was then escorted off by the federal police.

In June 2025, he was heavily criticised for outright hypocrisy for slamming the United Kingdom for sending asylum seeker to third countries in his The Guardian interview. This contradicted with the same kind of agreement signed with Italy. Rama, moreover, took a knee when welcoming Italian Prime Minister, Giorgia Meloni. This kneeling act was construed as Albania being subordinate to Italy, which invaded and occupied the country from 1939 to 1943.

== Honors ==
=== Orders, decorations, and medals ===
Award or decoration	Country	Date	Place
Legion of Honour	France	29 March 2017	Paris
Presidential Medal of Merits	Kosovo	16 February 2018	Pristina
Order of Saint-Charles	Monaco	10 April 2019	Monaco
Order of Prince Yaroslav the Wise (First class)	Ukraine	30 December 2023	Kyiv
Israeli Presidential Medal of Honour	Israel	7 April 2025	Jerusalem
Order of Zayed	United Arab Emirates	13 January 2026	Abu Dhabi

=== Other ===
Prime Minister Rama received the Global Leadership Award of pro-Israel NGO Combat Antisemitism Movement for his work in fighting antisemitism and other types of religious prejudice.

== See also ==
- List of Albanian painters
- List of current heads of state and government
- List of heads of the executive by approval rating
- Prime Minister of Albania

Political offices
Preceded by Albert Brojka	Mayor of Tirana; 2000–2011	Succeeded by Lulzim Basha
Preceded by Sali Berisha	Prime Minister of Albania; 2013–present	Incumbent
Preceded by Ditmir Bushati	Foreign Minister of Albania; 2019–2020	Succeeded by Olta Xhaçka
Party political offices
Preceded by Fatos Nano	Leader of the Socialist Party; 2005–present	Incumbent
