= Ministry of Urban Development (Albania) =

Ministry in Albania

- Ministria e Zhvillimit Urban

Department overview
- Formed: 15 September 2013
- Dissolved: 13 September 2017
- Jurisdiction: Council of Ministers
- Status: Dissolved
- Headquarters: Tirana, Albania
- Minister responsible: Eglantina Gjermeni (PS)
- Website: planifikimi.gov.al

The Ministry of Urban Development ("Ministria e Zhvillimit Urban " or "MZHU") was a department of the Albanian Government responsible for urban planning, development, housing and legalization of informal settlements. The last serving minister was Eglantina Gjermeni of the Socialist Party.

== Subordinate institutions ==
- Agency for Legalization, Urbanization and Integration of Informal Construction Areas
- National Agency of Territorial Planning
- Technical Construction Archive
- National Housing Authority

== Officeholders (2013–2017) ==
1. Eglantina Gjermeni (15 September 2013 – 13 September 2017)
