= Rama III Government =

Ruling government of Albania (2021–2025)

- 67th Government of Albania
- 2021‒2025
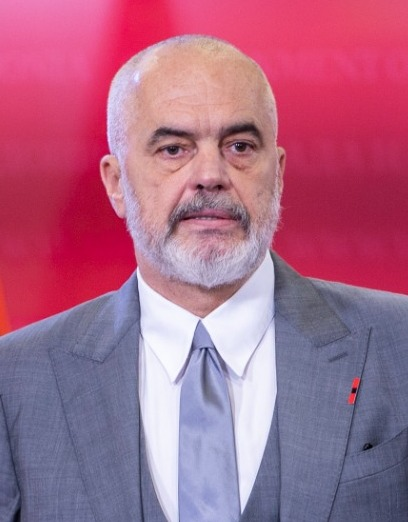
- Date formed: 18 September 2021
- Date dissolved: 12 September 2025

People and organisations
- President: Ilir Meta; Bajram Begaj
- Prime Minister: Edi Rama
- Deputy Prime Minister: Belinda Balluku
- No. of ministers: 17 (Note: The PM and Deputy Prime Minister are not counted.)
- Ministers removed: 4
- Total no. of members: 21
- Member parties: PS with support from PSD
- Status in legislature: Majority
- Opposition parties: PD, LSI, PSD, PR, PDIU, PAA, LZHK, PLL, PBDNJ
- Opposition leader: Ilir Meta; Sali Berisha

History
- Election: 2021 election
- Predecessor: Rama II Government
- Successor: Rama IV Government

The third Government of Prime Minister Edi Rama was the 67th ruling Government of the Republic of Albania. The Government was officially confirmed by President Ilir Meta on 18 September 2021. Following the 2021 election, the Socialist Party won, for the third consecutive time, a majority of seats in the Albanian Parliament, and, for the second consecutive time, the ability to form a government without the need for a coalition.

== Background ==
On 10 September 2021, the government of Prime Minister Rama received a vote of confidence in the Kuvendi. On 14 September, the President Ilir Meta decreed the government after all ministers were confirmed by the national anti-corruption agency, Special Structure against Corruption and Organized Crime (SPAK). Subsequently, on 18 September at 10:00 (CET), Rama's third cabinet was officially sworn in during a formal ceremony presided over by President at Presidenca in Tirana. After the oath-taking, Rama convened an inaugural session with the newly appointed ministers, comprising 12 women and 5 men, marking their first summit as the Këshilli i Ministrave at Kryeministria. The cabinet received parliamentary approval with 77 votes in favor, amid ongoing discussions regarding President Meta's recent dismissal, which awaited a ruling from the Constitutional Court. The administration's agenda emphasised earthquake reconstruction, effective pandemic management, enhancement of welfare, and initiatives aimed at economic modernisation and the fortification of the rule of law.

== Cabinet ==
The Rama's III government differs slightly from the end of the previous mandate, making its key posts entrusted to the same ministers again. Ministers such as Belinda Balluku and Ogerta Manastirliu were reconfirmed in previous positions, taking into account the popularity won during the exercise of their duties. Both were ranked high in the polls, especially Ogerta Manastirliu for her actions during the COVID-19 pandemic in Albania, which gave her a lot of popularity for the management of the situation despite the criticism.

The new Albanian government was widely praised for the dominance of women in ministerial posts. Out of 17 ministries, 12 will be led by women, making it fifth globally in women's representation in Cabinet, according to the latest United Nations. Rama himself in his speech in parliament described it as “This new government will enter history as the cabinet with the highest number of women”. In this new mandate, Arben Ahmetaj was also reconfirmed in office as Minister of State for Reconstruction and Reform Program, but was also appointed Deputy Prime Minister. Giving importance to the program of reconstruction and recovery from the consequences of the earthquake of November 2019, where damage was done to apartments, schools, cultural and historical objects, as well as infrastructure. On 11 January 2024, a new ministry, Ministry of State for Public Administration and Anti-Corruption, was created to ease the negotiations for the accession of Albania to the European Union.

- An asterisk (*) indicates an elected member of the Albanian Parliament.

Portfolio	Minister	Took office	Left office	Party	
Prime Minister	Edi Rama	18 September 2021	12 September 2025	*	PS
Deputy Prime Minister	Arben Ahmetaj	18 September 2021	28 July 2022	*	PS
Deputy Prime Minister	Belinda Balluku	28 July 2022	12 September 2025	*	PS
Ministry of Economy, Culture and Innovation	Blendi Gonxhja	10 January 2024	12 September 2025		PS
Ministry of Finance	Petrit Malaj	30 July 2024	12 September 2025		PS
Ministry of Interior	Bledar Çuçi	18 September 2021	8 July 2023	*	PS
Ministry of Interior	Taulant Balla	8 July 2023	30 July 2024		PS
Ministry of Interior	Ervin Hoxha	30 July 2024	12 September 2025		PS
Ministry of Defence	Niko Peleshi	18 September 2021	30 July 2024	*	PS
Ministry of Defence	Pirro Vengu	30 July 2024	12 September 2025		PS
Ministry for Europe and Foreign Affairs	Olta Xhaçka	18 September 2021	12 September 2023	*	PS
Ministry for Europe and Foreign Affairs	Igli Hasani	12 September 2023	12 September 2025		PS
Ministry of Justice	Ulsi Manja	18 September 2021	12 September 2025	*	PS
Minister of Infrastructure and Energy	Belinda Balluku	18 September 2021	12 September 2025		PS
Ministry of Education, Sports and Youth	Evis Kushi	18 September 2021	11 September 2023	*	PS
Ministry of Education, Sports and Youth	Ogerta Manastirliu	11 September 2023	12 September 2025	*	PS
Ministry of Agriculture and Rural Development	Frida Krifca	18 September 2021	11 September 2023		PS
Ministry of Agriculture and Rural Development	Anila Denaj	11 September 2023	12 September 2025	*	PS
Ministry of Health and Social Protection	Ogerta Manastirliu	18 September 2021	11 September 2023		PS
Ministry of Health and Social Protection	Albana Koçiu	11 September 2023	12 September 2025		PS
Ministry of Tourism and Environment	Mirela Kumbaro Furxhi	18 September 2021	12 September 2025	*	PS
Minister of State for Relations with Parliament	Elisa Spiropali	18 September 2021	30 July 2024	*	PS
Minister of State for Relations with Parliament	Taulant Balla	30 July 2024	12 September 2025	*	PS
Minister of State for Entrepreneurs	Edona Bilali	18 September 2021	11 September 2023	*	PS
Minister of State for Entrepreneurs	Delina Ibrahimaj	11 September 2023	12 September 2025		PS
Minister of State for Youth and Children	Bora Muzhaqi	18 September 2021	12 September 2025		PS
Minister of State and Chief Negotiator	Majlinda Dhuka	28 July 2022	12 September 2025		PS
Minister of State for Local Government	Arbjan Mazniku	11 September 2023	12 September 2025		PS
Minister of State for Public Administration and Anti-Corruption	Adea Pirdeni	10 January 2024	12 September 2025		PS

=== Former Ministries ===
Portfolio	Minister	Took office	Left office	Party	
Minister of State for Reconstruction and Reform Program	Arben Ahmetaj	18 September 2021	28 July 2022		PS
Minister of State for Standards Services	Milva Ekonomi	18 September 2021	11 September 2023	*	PS
Ministry of Finances and Economy	Delina Ibrahimaj	18 September 2021	10 January 2024		PS
Ministry of Culture	Elva Margariti	18 September 2021	10 January 2024		PS

== See also ==
- Politics of Albania
