= Rama IV Government =

Ruling government of Albania from 2025

- 68th Government of Albania
- 2025‒Incumbent
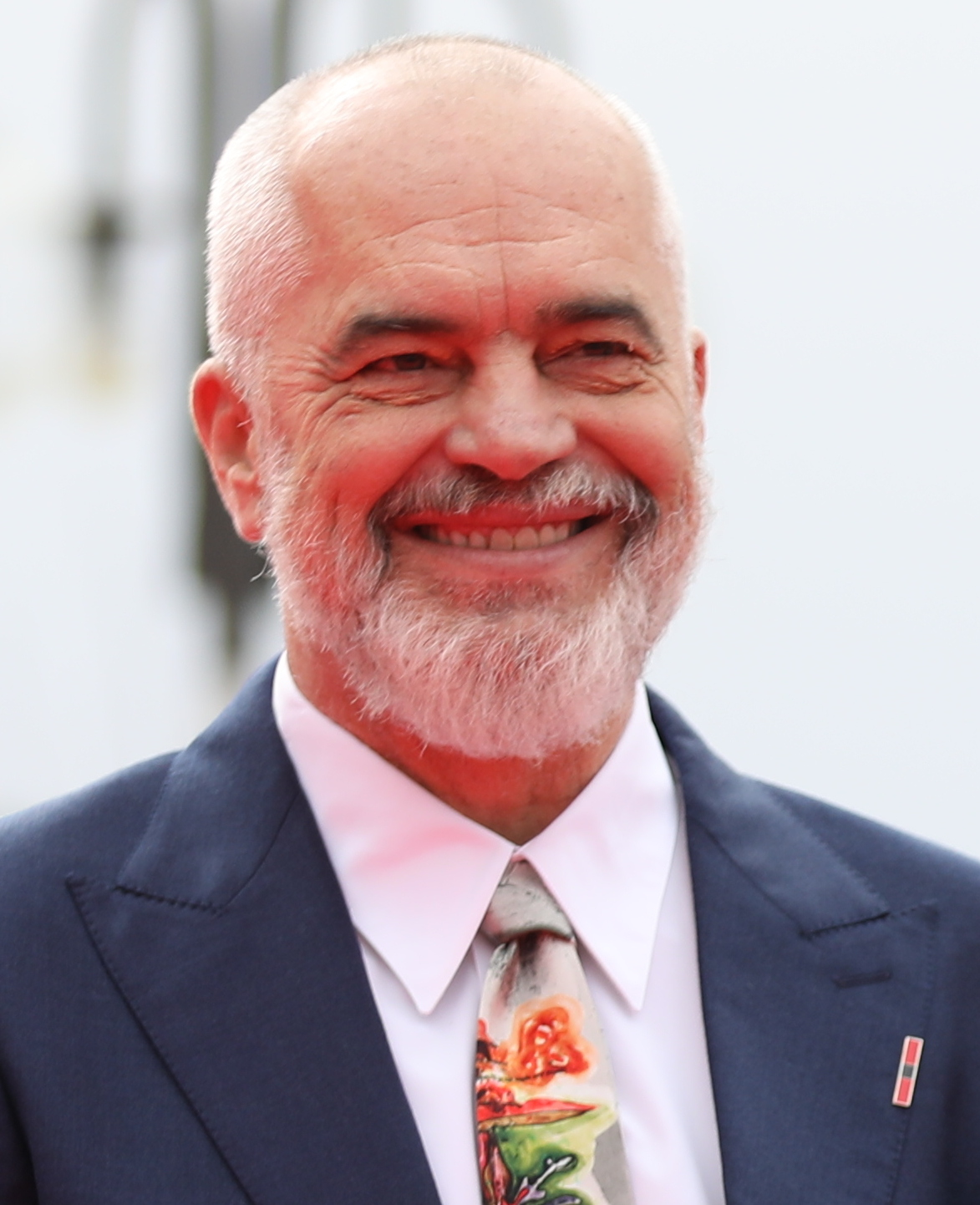
- Date formed: 12 September 2025; 13 months ago

People and organisations
- President: Bajram Begaj
- Prime Minister: Edi Rama
- Deputy Prime Minister: Albana Koçiu
- No. of ministers: 17 (Note: The PM and Deputy Prime Minister are not counted.) (Note: Not counting the "AI minister.")
- Total no. of members: 17
- Member parties: PS
- Status in legislature: Majority
- Opposition parties: PD, PL, PM, SHB; LB, PR, PDIU, PAA; PBDNJ
- Opposition leader: Sali Berisha

History
- Election: 2025 election
- Predecessor: Rama III Government

The fourth Government of Prime Minister Edi Rama is the 68th ruling Government of the Republic of Albania. The Government was officially confirmed by President Bajram Begaj on 12 September 2025. Following the 2025 election, the Socialist Party won, for the fourth consecutive time, a majority of seats in the Albanian Parliament, and, for the third consecutive time, the ability to form a government without the need for a coalition.

== Cabinet ==
The cabinet includes the world's first AI minister, Diella, serving as Virtual Minister of State for Artificial Intelligence. The responsibilities for establishing and operating the Virtual Minister of Artificial Intelligence "Diella" are exercised by the Prime Minister.

On 20 November 2025, the Special Court Against Corruption and Organized Crime ordered two security measures against Deputy Prime Minister and Minister of Infrastructure and Energy Belinda Balluku: suspension from her governmental duties and a ban on leaving the country. The decision followed her being formally charged by the Special Prosecution Office in connection with the Llogara Tunnel affair, including alleged violations of equality in public procurement related to the tunnel project and the fourth lot of Tirana’s Outer Ring Road. Balluku had previously stated in parliament that she would not comment on ongoing investigations and had reaffirmed her support for the justice reform.

Portfolio	Minister	Took office	Left office	Party
Prime Minister	Edi Rama	12 September 2025	Incumbent	PS
Deputy Prime Minister	Belinda Balluku	12 September 2025	20 November 2025 (Suspended)	PS
Deputy Prime Minister	Albana Koçiu	26 February 2026	Incumbent	PS
Ministry of Economy and Innovation	Delina Ibrahimaj	12 September 2025	Incumbent	PS
Ministry of Finance	Petrit Malaj	12 September 2025	Incumbent	PS
Ministry of Internal Affairs	Albana Koçiu	19 September 2025	26 February 2026	PS
Ministry of Internal Affairs	Besfort Lamallari	6 March 2026	11 September 2026	PS
Ministry of Internal Affairs	Ervin Demo	11 September 2026	Incumbent	PS
Ministry of Defence	Pirro Vengu	30 July 2024	26 February 2026	PS
Ministry of Defence	Ermal Nufi	6 March 2026	Incumbent	PS
Ministry for Europe and Foreign Affairs	Elisa Spiropali	19 September 2025	26 February 2026	PS
Ministry for Europe and Foreign Affairs	Ferit Hoxha	26 February 2026	Incumbent	PS
Ministry of Justice	Besfort Lamallari	19 September 2025	6 March 2026	PS
Ministry of Justice	Toni Gogu	6 March 2026	Incumbent	PS
Ministry of Infrastructure and Energy	Belinda Balluku	17 January 2019	6 March 2026	PS
Ministry of Infrastructure and Energy	Enea Karakaçi	6 March 2026	Incumbent	PS
Ministry of Education	Mirela Kumbaro Furxhi	12 September 2025	Incumbent	PS
Ministry of Agriculture and Rural Development	Andis Salla	12 September 2025	Incumbent	PS
Ministry of Health and Social Welfare	Evis Sala	19 September 2025	3 September 2026	PS
Ministry of Health and Social Welfare	Klodiana Spahiu	3 September 2026	Incumbent	PS
Ministry of State for Relations with Parliament	Toni Gogu	19 September 2025	6 March 2026	PS
Ministry of State for Relations with Parliament	Erjona Ismaili	6 March 2026	Incumbent	PS
Ministry of State and Chief Negotiator	Majlinda Dhuka	12 September 2025	Incumbent	PS
Ministry of State for Local Government (Abolished in September 2026 and merged into the Ministry of Internal Affairs)	Ervin Demo	19 September 2025	11 September 2026	PS
Ministry of Public Administration (Established on 23 October 2026, succeeding the Ministry of State for Public Administration and Anti-Corruption)	Adea Pirdeni	23 October 2026	Incumbent	PS
Ministry of Tourism, Culture and Sports	Blendi Gonxhja	12 September 2025	Incumbent	PS
Ministry of Environment	Sofjan Jaupaj	12 September 2025	Incumbent	PS
Ministry of State for Artificial Intelligence	None (powered by Diella)	12 September 2025	Incumbent	None (AI)

Source: Kryeministria
