= Ardit Bido =

Albanian academic and politician

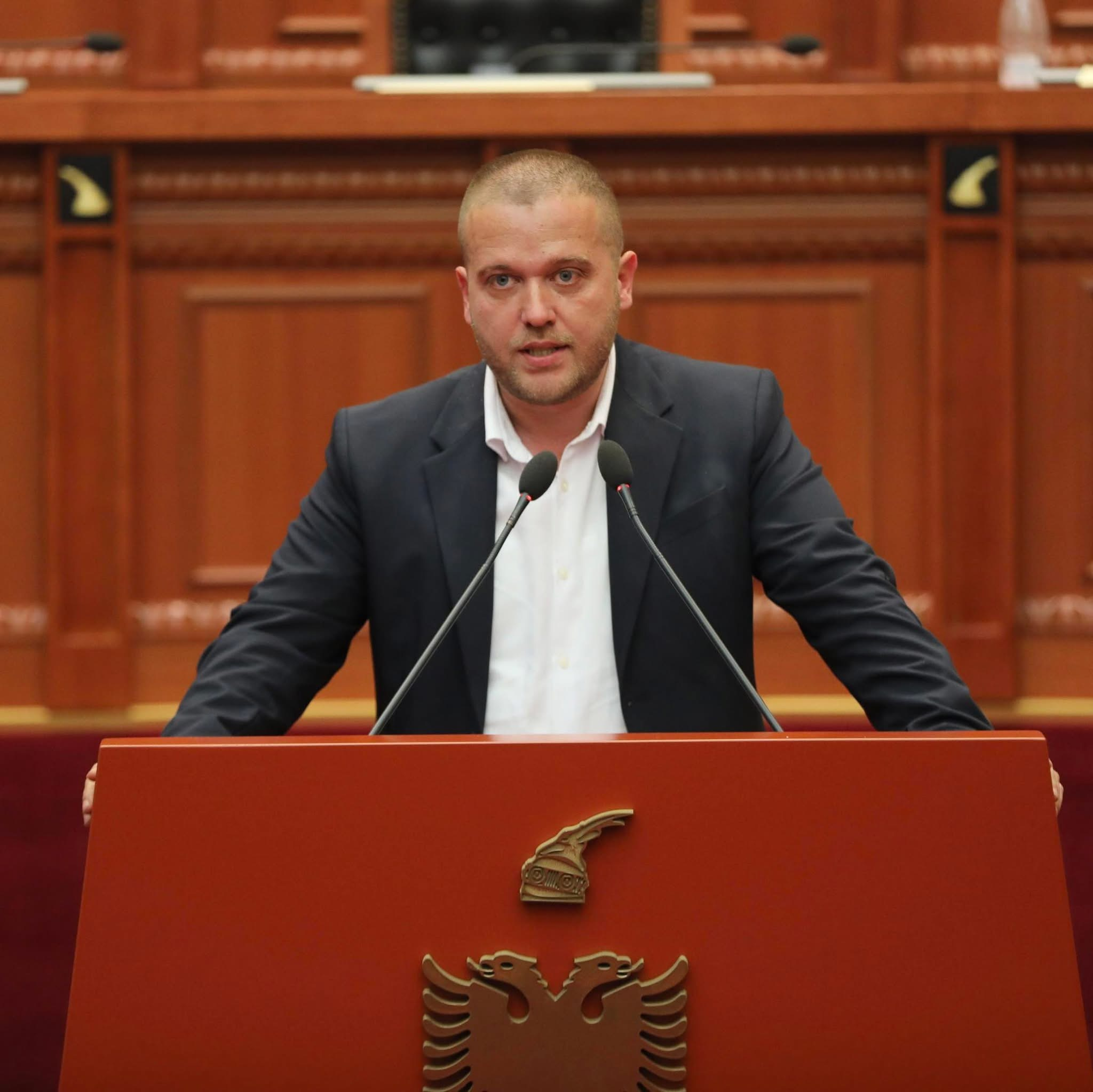

Member of the Albanian Parliament
- Incumbent
- Assumed office 12 September 2025
- Constituency: Vlorë County

Director General of the General Directorate of Archives
- In office 2016–2025

Personal details
- Born: 20 July 1987 (age 39) Sarandë, PSR Albania
- Party: Socialist Party of Albania
- Education: University of Tirana (BA, MA, PhD)
- Occupation: Academic, historian, politician
- Website: arditbido.al

Ardit Bido (born 20 July 1987) is an Albanian politician and academic. An associate professor at the University of Tirana, Bido also served as Director General of the National Archives of Albania before he was elected to the Albanian Parliament in the 2025 Albanian elections, representing Vlorë County.

== Early life and education ==
Ardit Bido was born in Saranda, Albania on 20 July 1987. He graduated with a Bachelor's degree on journalism from the University of Tirana, where he also received a Master's degree and PHD in international relations. His dissertation was focused on the links between religion, politics and international relations.

== Career ==
Bido worked as a journalist in a number of media outlets, firstly as an editor of the Standard newspaper, and as a contributor with Albanian Radio Television and Club FM, Tirana. Between 2008 and 2011, he worked as editor-in-chief by Ora News Radio Television and later for the Standard. In 2012 he launched Kombetare newspaper, which he published until 2013.

Bido also worked as public relations officer of the University of Tirana and Director of Communications of the Metropolitan University of Tirana, before beginning a career in the government. He was appointed senior adviser to the General Director of the Social Insurance Institute in 2013.

On 1 September 2016, Prime Minister Edi Rama nominated Bido as the General Director of Archives of Albania. During his tenure, Bido oversaw the digitization and modernization of the Archives, with Voice of America suggesting that the archives are comparable to those in other western countries.

== Academia ==
Bido is an Associate Professor of International Relations at the University of Tirana, with research focusing on religion, nationalism, and state formation in Southeast Europe. He also lectures at the Metropolitan University of Tirana. Bido is an academic member of the Athens Institute of Education and Research, as well as of the editorial board of Metropolitan Tirana Journal and the Athens Journal of Social Sciences.

=== Publications ===
Bido has authored a number of papers in national and international journals and three monographs:

- Bido, Ardit (2023). Beteja për 20 përqindshin [Battle of the 20 percent]. Tirana, Albania: Dudaj.
- Bido, Ardit (2016). Kisha Ortodokse Shqiptare: një histori politike (1878-1937) [Albanian Orthodox Church: a political history (1878-1937)] (in Albanian). Tirana, Albania: UET Press. ISBN 978-9928190734.
- Bido, Ardit (2010). Koncesioni editorial i medias shqiptare [Editorial concessions of the Albanian media]. Tirana, Albania: Trifon Xhagjika.

== Parliament ==
In the 2025 Albanian parliamentary elections, Bido was elected as a member of the Assembly of Albania, representing Vlorë County as part of the Socialist Party. He is a member of the 32nd legislature (Kuvendi) formed following the 2025 elections.

In Parliament, Bido serves on the Committee on Human Rights, Public Administration and Media, where he holds the position of Secretary. His parliamentary work focuses on human rights, governance reform, and the modernization of public administration.

He is also a substitute member of Albania’s delegation to the Parliamentary Assembly of the Council of Europe (PACE), where he has been involved in discussions related to democracy, human rights, and European institutional standards.

Bido’s legislative and political priorities include strengthening digital governance, improving public service delivery, protecting cultural heritage, and promoting inclusive regional development, particularly in southern Albania.
