= Rama Government =

Rama Government may refer to:

- Rama I Government
- Rama II Government
- Rama III Government
- Rama IV Government
