= UMT =

UMT can refer to:

- University of Medicine, Tirana
- Metropolitan University of Tirana
- Moroccan Workers' Union (French: Union Marocaine du Travail)
- Universal Military Training
- Military Selective Service Act, conscription law in the United States (formerly known as the Universal Military Training and Service Act)
- UMT AG (United Mobility Technology AG) in Munich
- Universal Mobile Telecommunications System, a 3rd generation (3g) GSM-based cellular network standard.
- Universiti Malaysia Terengganu (formerly known as KUSTEM)
- University of Management and Technology, Virginia in Arlington, Virginia
- University of Management and Technology, Lahore in Pakistan
- University of Montana in Missoula, Montana
