= Mirela Kumbaro =

Albanian politician (born 1966)

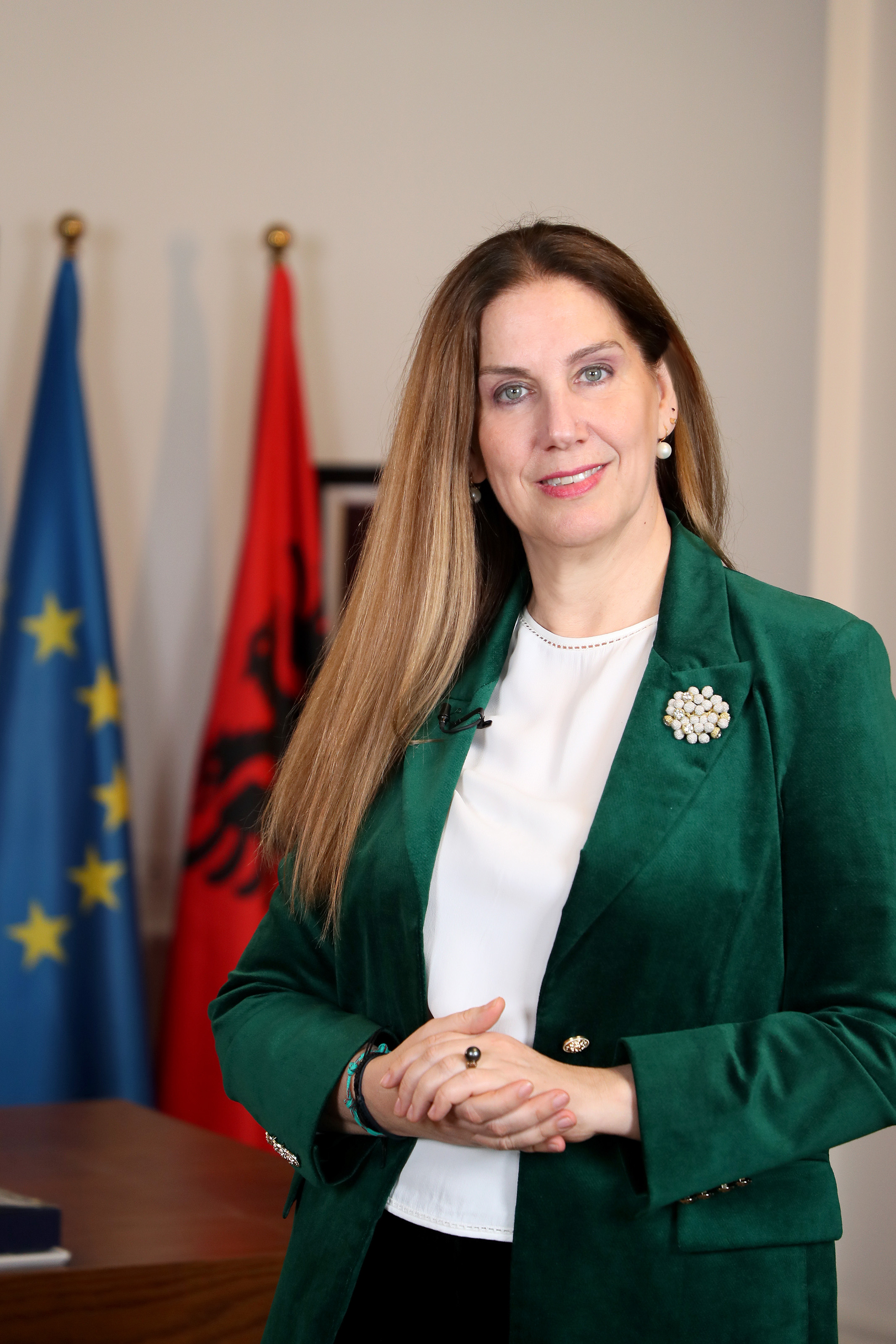
- Official portrait, 2022

Minister of Education
- Incumbent
- Assumed office 19 September 2025
- President: Bajram Begaj
- Prime Minister: Edi Rama
- Preceded by: Ogerta Manastirliu

Minister of Tourism and Environment
- In office 18 September 2021 – 19 September 2025
- President: Ilir Meta (until 24 July 2022); Bajram Begaj (since 24 July 2022)
- Prime Minister: Edi Rama
- Preceded by: Blendi Klosi
- Succeeded by: Blendi Gonxhja

Minister of Culture
- In office 15 September 2013 – 17 January 2019
- President: Bujar Nishani; Ilir Meta
- Prime Minister: Edi Rama
- Preceded by: Visar Zhiti
- Succeeded by: Elva Margariti

Member of the Albanian parliament
- Incumbent
- Assumed office 9 September 2017

Personal details
- Born: 4 March 1966 (age 60) Tirana, Albania
- Party: Socialist Party
- Education: University of Tirana, University of Sorbonne
- Profession: Professor, Translator
- Cabinet: Rama Cabinet (I, II, III, IV)

Mirela Kumbaro Furxhi (born 4 March 1966), is an Albanian politician currently serving as the Minister of Education of Albania since 19 September 2025. Previously she has served as the Minister of Tourism and Environment from 2021 to 2025 and as the Minister of Culture from 2013 to 2019.

== Education ==
Kumbaro completed university studies and graduated from the University of Tirana, Faculty of Foreign Languages, with papers in French, in 1988.

In 2009, was made a Doctor of Science in the field of translation studies at the University of Tirana and received a master's degree in translation and intercultural communication in 1994, at the School of Interpreting and Translation at Sorbonne Nouvelle University Paris 3, France.

== Career ==
Kumbaro has worked as a translator, publisher and international expert on intercultural projects and university research programs undertaken by international organizations like the European Union and the Organisation internationale de la Francophonie.

Kumbaro has been an associate professor since 2012 at the University of Tirana in the field of linguistics.

== Political career ==
In the 2017 elections, she was elected as member of parliament for Gjirokastër County.
