= Sonila Qato =

Albanian politician and lawyer

Minister of State for Entrepreneurs of Albania
- In office September 2017 – January 2019
- President: Ilir Meta
- Prime Minister: Edi Rama
- Succeeded by: Eduard Shalsi

General Manager of the Property Treatment Agency
- In office 2013–2017
- Succeeded by: Jonida Baçi

Personal details
- Born: 19 September 1977 (age 48) Tirana, Albania
- Party: Socialist Party of Albania
- Education: University of Tirana
- Occupation: Politician, lawyer
- Cabinet: Rama II Cabinet

Sonila Qato is an Albanian politician and lawyer. She served as Minister of State for Entrepreneurs of Albania from 2017 to 2019.

== Early life ==
Sonila Qato was born in Tirana, Albania on 19 September 1977.

In 2001, Qato graduated from the Faculty of Law of the University of Tirana.

== Political life ==
From 2012 to 2013, Qato served as the Director of the Cabinet of the Chairperson of the Socialist Party of Albania. She also served as the General Manager of Albania's Property Treatment Agency (Drejtore e Përgjithshme e Agjencisë së Trajtimit të Pronave).

In September 2018, Qato was appointed the Minister of State for Entrepreneurs of Albania.
