= Eduard Shalsi =

Albanian politician (born 1968)

Eduard Shalsi MP
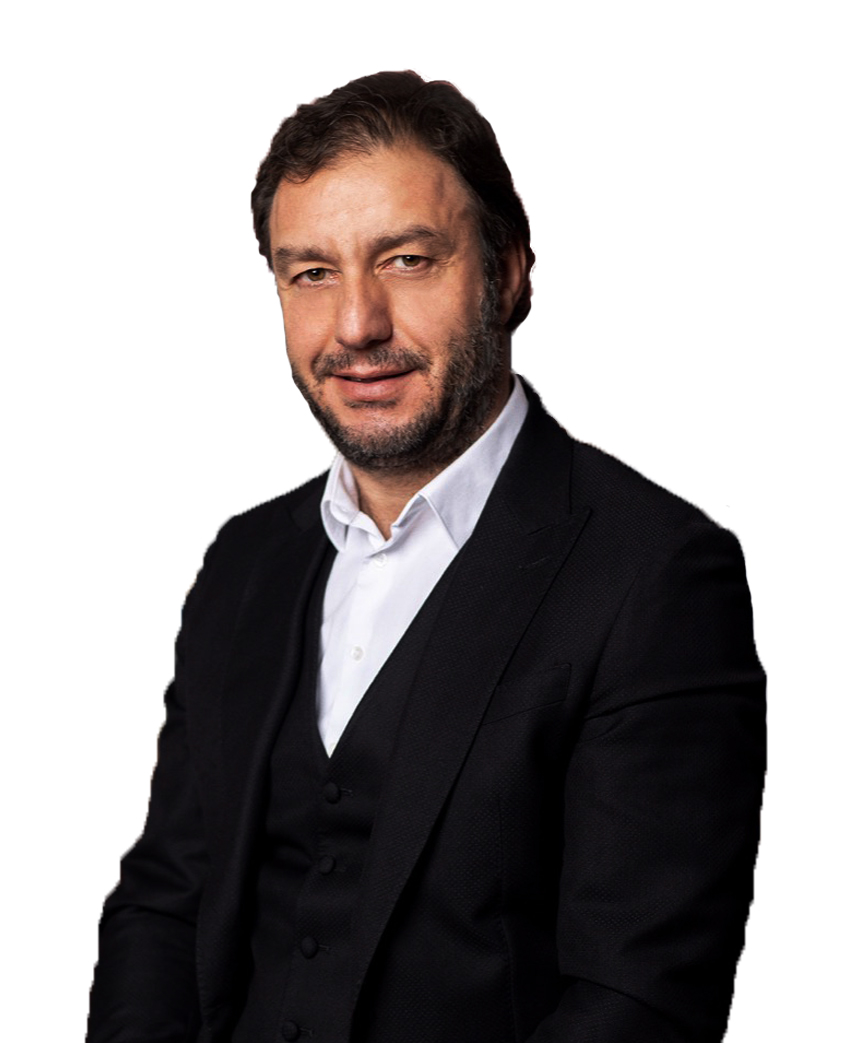

Member of the 28th, 29th, 30th and 31st Parliament of Albania
- Incumbent
- Assumed office 7 September 2009
- President: Bamir Topi; Bujar Nishani; Ilir Meta
- Prime Minister: Sali Berisha; Edi Rama
- Parliamentary group: PS
- Constituency: Tirana (2009–2013); Berat (2013–2017); Korçë (2017–2021); Tirana (2021–2025)

Minister of State for Local Affairs
- In office 24 March 2017 – 13 September 2017
- President: Bujar Nishani
- Prime Minister: Edi Rama
- Preceded by: Bledar Çuçi
- Succeeded by: abolished

Minister of State for Entrepreneurship Protection
- In office 17 January 2019 – 18 September 2021
- President: Ilir Meta
- Prime Minister: Edi Rama
- Preceded by: Sonila Qato
- Succeeded by: Edona Bilali

Personal details
- Born: 1 April 1968 (age 58) Korçë, Albania
- Party: Socialist Party
- Spouse: Eranda Shalsi
- Children: Three
- Education: University of Tirana

Eduard Shalsi was born in the city of Korça in 1968. He is the husband of Mrs. Eranda Shalsi and father of three children, Patrick, Samuel and Claire.

== Biography ==
Shalsi graduated from the Faculty of Natural Sciences in Biology-Chemistry in 1990 in Tirana. After completing his university studies, Shalsi practiced teaching in elementary and secondary education in Tirana. From 1992 to 1995 he emigrated to Greece. During the years 1996-2003 he worked in the banking sector, becoming one of the leaders of the first private bank in Albania, Tirana Bank.

== Political career ==
In the years 2003-2004, Shalsi was the General Director of one of the largest insurance companies in the country, INSIG sha, a position he left to join the Municipality of Tirana in 2004, initially in the position of Chief of Cabinet and then as Deputy Mayor until 2009.

From 2009 until today, Shalsi is a member of the Albanian Parliament, where in the years 2009-2013 he was a deputy in the district of Tirana, 2013-2017 deputy in the district of Berat and 2017-2021 deputy in the district of Pogradec. During this period, Shalsi has held important positions, including: Minister of State for Local Affairs and National Coordinator of Anti-Corruption, Chairman of the Standing Parliamentary Committee on Production Activities, Trade and Environment, Deputy Chairman of the Socialist Parliamentary Group, Member of the Delegation of the Assembly of Albania to the EU-Albania Stabilization and Association Committee, Member of the Parliamentary Assembly of the Council of Europe, etc. Since 2019, he has led the Ministry of State for Protection and Entrepreneurship with great dedication, being every day with businesses in solving their problems. In 2019, Shalsi was certified by the Harvard Business School in Leading Economic Growth and for more than two years has been a Member of the Ethical Governance Board of Standards of Excellence, Quality Leadership Committee, Vice Chairman of the Global Startup Committee at the World Business Angels Forum (WBAF) as well as Member of the G20 Global Partnership for Financial Inclusion. Shalsi is fluent in four languages, Albanian, English, Greek and Italian. Shalsi has been the President of the Albanian Chess Federation since 2016 and is passionate about sports and the musical instrument mandolin. For the local elections of April 25, 2021, Shalsi is a candidate in the list for the district of Tirana with number 18.
