= General Maritime Directorate =

Government agency of Albania

- Drejtoria e Pëgjithshme Detare

Agency overview
- Formed: 2 April 2009
- Jurisdiction: Albania
- Headquarters: Durrës
- Minister responsible: Belinda Balluku, Minister of Infrastructure and Energy
- Agency executive: Pavlin Ndreu, Director General
- Website: dpdetare.gov.al

The General Maritime Directorate (Albanian: Drejtoria e Pëgjithshme Detare) is an institution of the Albanian government under the supervision of the Ministry of Infrastructure and Energy. This institution exercises its functions in accordance with Law No.9251, dated 07.08.2004, titled "Maritime Code of the Republic of Albania" and later amended by Law No.10109, dated 02.04.2009, titled "For the Maritime Administration of the Republic of Albania".

== Overview ==
The directorate oversees and coordinates the activity of all constituent structures of the maritime administration in the Republic of Albania and exercises control over their performance. It provides technical assistance in the drafting and alignment of national maritime legislation to be in compliance with international standards and completes the national legal framework for the implementation of international agreements related to the law of the sea and maritime transport, to which Albania is a party.

This institution represents the state on maritime related issues at the United Nations, the International Maritime Organization (IMO) and the International Labour Organization among others. It cooperates with the main institutions in the country related to maritime activities, such as the Coast Guard, Border Police structures, Customs agencies, environmental agencies, the Hydrographic Service and associations of private operators.
