= Edona Bilali =

Albanian politician

Minister of State for Entrepreneurs
- In office 18 September 2021 – 11 September 2023
- Prime Minister: Edi Rama
- Preceded by: Eduard Shalsi
- Succeeded by: Delina Ibrahimaj

Member of the Albanian parliament
- Incumbent
- Assumed office 10 September 2021

Personal details
- Born: 1989 (age 36–37) Shkodër, Albania
- Party: Socialist Party
- Education: University of Tirana, Hult International Business School
- Cabinet: Rama Cabinet (III)

Edona Bilali is an Albanian politician. She served as the Minister of State for entrepreneurship protection in the Albanian government. She was appointed Minister of entrepreneurship protection since September 10, 2021. Edona Bilali graduated with a masters in science in 2010 from Faculty of Economics, University of Tirana, and then went on to study for a master's degree, also in Tirana, Albania at Hult International Business School, in the field of International Business. She is also Member of the Parliament of Albania since 2021.
