= National Nuclear Agency (Albania) =

Government agency of Albania

- Agjencia Kombëtare Bërthamore

Government agency overview
- Formed: 20 January 2010 (16 years ago)
- Jurisdiction: Council of Ministers
- Headquarters: Tirana, Albania
- Minister responsible: Belinda Balluku, Ministry of Infrastructure and Energy
- Website: akob.gov.al

The National Nuclear Agency (Albanian: Agjencia Kombëtare Bërthamore – AKOB) is an agency of the Albanian government which focuses on nuclear research and development. It is a subordinate institution of the Ministry of Infrastructure and Energy.

== Overview ==
Pursuant to Article 100 of the Constitution, Article 10 of Law no. 9000, dated 30.1.2003 "On the organization and functioning of the Council of Ministers" and law no. 10/314, dated 16.9.2010 "On the ratification of the extended protocol of the agreement, between the Republic of Albania and the International Atomic Energy Agency, for the implementation of guarantees in all nuclear activities in Albania", following the proposal of the Deputy Prime Minister and Minister of Economy, Trade and Energy, Sokol Olldashi, the Council of Ministers approved the creation of the National Nuclear Agency.

The agency is tasked with building the necessary infrastructure, in support of the national nuclear program, as well as drafting the full legal framework, which will support the normal development of the program. The primary duties of the agency as specified in the draft law are stated below:

"Coordinating the work for the selection of the location where a future nuclear power plant would be built. Selecting and ensuring the professional training of the necessary personnel, in support of the nuclear program, in its various stages. The drafting of the documentation and the following of the procedures, on the basis of which bids will be requested for construction of the nuclear power plant".

The agency will supervise all phases and procedures for the construction and commissioning of the nuclear power plant, ensuring the short-term and long-term storage of nuclear fuel, as well as all radioactive materials which are related to the energy production process from the nuclear power plant.
