= Transport Institute (Albania) =

Government agency of Albania

- Instituti i Transportit

Agency overview
- Formed: 21 November 2007 (18 years ago)
- Jurisdiction: Council of Ministers
- Headquarters: Rruga e Kavajës, Nr.39, H.3, Ap.3, Tirana, Albania
- Minister responsible: Belinda Balluku, Minister of Infrastructure and Energy
- Website: ital.gov.al

The Transport Institute (Albanian: Instituti i Transportit) is a budgetary entity of the Albanian government that specializes in carrying out studies for road, rail, maritime and air transport. The institute has carried out mid-term and long-term studies applicable to the transport sector and has participated in various regional programs.

== Overview ==
The institute had its beginnings with the adoption of the Road Code (Albanian: Kodi Rrugor), published by the government in April 1985. In the framework of the programs undertaken by the Albanian Government for the reform of research institutions, following decision no. 861, dated 21.11.2007 of the Council of Ministers, titled "On the Creation, Organization and Functions of the Institute of Transport", the Transport Institute was created as a "service unit" under the supervision of the Ministry of Infrastructure and Energy.

The mission of the Transport Institute is to create and maintain a database for the transport sector, supporting the Ministry with data and analytical tools to develop policies and strategies for the transport sector, including monitoring and updating the National Transport Plan (PKT).
