= National Food Authority =

National Food Authority may refer to:

- National Food Authority (Albania)
- National Food Authority (Philippines)
