= General Directorate of Road Transport Services =

Government agency of Albania

- Drejtoria e Pëgjithshme e Shërbimeve të Transportit Rrugor

Agency overview
- Formed: 21 July 1999
- Jurisdiction: Albania
- Headquarters: Tirana
- Minister responsible: Belinda Balluku, Minister of Infrastructure and Energy
- Agency executive: Blendi Gonxhja, General Director
- Website: www.dpshtrr.al

The General Directorate of Road Transport Services (Albanian: Drejtoria e Pëgjithshme e Shërbimeve të Transportit Rrugor – DPSHTRR) is an Albanian public state institution responsible for the registration of vehicles (equipping them with licence plates, registration and ownership titles), monitoring the qualification of drivers and issuing them with driving licenses, mandating technical control of road vehicles and creating a national electronic database of vehicles and drivers.

The directorate performs the duties of a tax entity according to legal provisions and awards certifications to independent driving schools. Established by a decision of the Council of Ministers no. 343 dated 21.07.1999, it is funded by and under the supervision of the Ministry of Infrastructure and Energy.

== See also ==
- Driving licence in Albania
- Vehicle registration plates of Albania
