= Milva Ekonomi =

Albanian politician

Milva Ekonomi MP
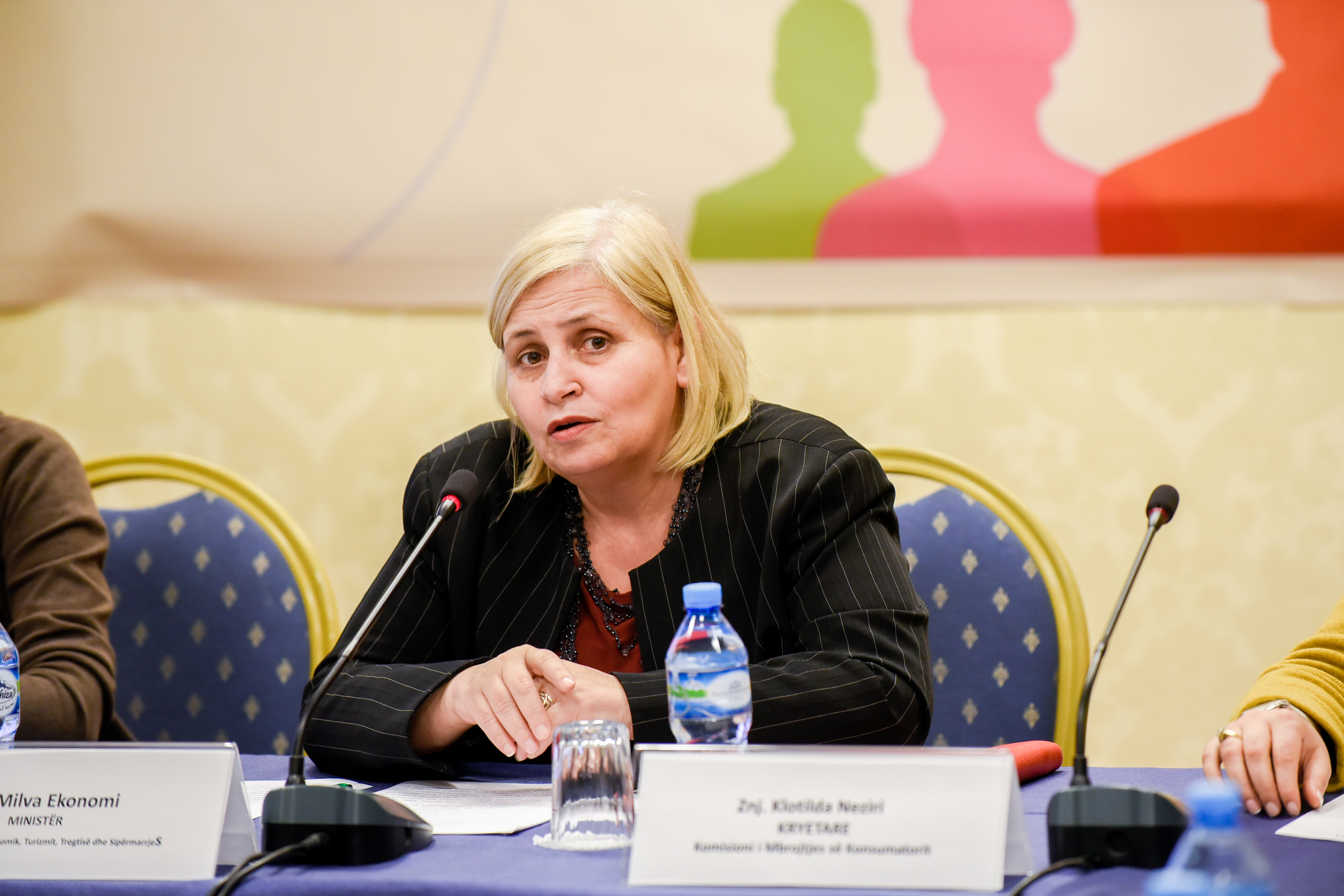
- Image of Milva Ekonomi

Minister of State for Standards and Services
- In office 18 September 2021 – 11 September 2023
- President: Ilir Meta; Bajram Begaj
- Prime Minister: Edi Rama

Member of the 30th and 31st Parliament of Albania
- Incumbent
- Assumed office 9 September 2017
- President: Ilir Meta
- Prime Minister: Edi Rama
- Parliamentary group: PS
- Constituency: Durrës (2017–2025)

Ministry of Economic Development, Tourism, Trade and Enterprise
- In office 26 February 2016 – 13 September 2017
- President: Bujar Nishani
- Prime Minister: Edi Rama
- Preceded by: Arben Ahmetaj

Ministry of Agriculture and Rural Development
- In office 18 December 2020 – 18 September 2021
- President: Ilir Meta
- Prime Minister: Edi Rama
- Preceded by: Bledar Çuçi
- Succeeded by: Frida Krifca

Personal details
- Born: 31 December 1962 (age 63) Tirana, Albania
- Party: Socialist Party
- Education: Agricultural University of Tirana; University of Tirana

Milva Ekonomi (born in Tirana, Albania) is an Albanian politician. She is currently serving as the Minister of State for Standards and Services in the Albanian government of Prime minister Edi Rama. She was appointed Minister of State for Standards and Services since September 10, 2021. She studied Statistics and Economics at the Agricultural University of Tirana, and a Master in Business Administration (MBA) from the University of Tirana.

Ekonomi was a lecturer at the University of Tirana, Agricultural University. She has been nationally and internationally published in the field of statistics, social and economic development, as well as gender studies.

She has also served as a member of the Municipal Council of Tirana from 2000 to 2011. Previously she was the Deputy Minister of Health from 2013 to 2016. In February 2016, she was appointed Minister of Economic Development, Tourism, Trade and Entrepreneurship. In January 2020, she became chair of the Committee on Economy and Finance. In December 2020, she was appointed Minister of Agriculture and Rural Development.
