= National Center of Folkloric Activities =

Qendra Kombëtare e Veprimtarive Folklorike
- Official logo
- Established: 6 June 1994
- Focus: Traditional folklore
- Director: Armanda Hysa
- Formerly called: Central House of Popular Creativity
- Address: Rr. Gëzim Erebara, ish-Kinostudio, 1001 Tirana
- Location: Tirana, Albania
- Website: folklor.gov.al

The National Center of Folkloric Activities (Albanian: Qendra Kombëtare e Veprimtarive Folklorike, QKVF) is an Albanian state institution that deals with activities in the field of folklore.

== History ==
QKVF was established by Order No.124, Dt.06.06.1994 of the Minister of Culture, Youth and Sports, in the framework of restructuring the former Central House of Popular Creativity. The institution has its own statute, approved by the Minister of Culture that includes the statutory regulations and the identifying logo used to carry out institutional activities in the field of folkloric heritage.

Since 1994, QKVF has organized national and typological festivals, based on scientific criteria that entertain the general public while propagating, preserving, and transmitting the original character of folklore, as part of the cultural heritage of the Albanian nation. The institution maintains links with cultural associations in Albania, Kosovo, North Macedonia, Montenegro, and throughout the Albanian diaspora. One of the recent innovations of QKVF was the publication of the magazine "Traces of the Albanian Soul", which reflects the national activities of folklore, as well as issues related to the organizing of folklore festivals. It also publicizes the biographies of popular artists in the service of the National Register of Folk Artists and other study materials in folklore.
