= Tedi Dobi =

Albanian lawyer and politician

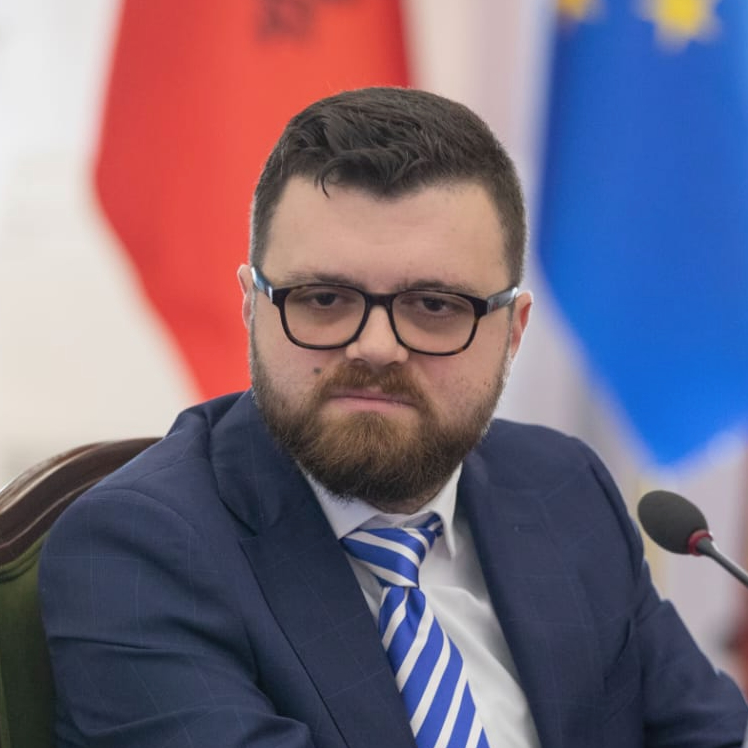

Deputy Minister of Justice
- In office 3 April 2024 – 12 November 2026
- President: Bajram Begaj
- Prime Minister: Edi Rama
- Minister: Ulsi Manja
- Preceded by: Adea Pirdeni
- Succeeded by: Nadia Peto

Personal details
- Born: 25 July 1991 (age 35) Tirana, Albania
- Education: Li Po Chun United World College
- Alma mater: University of Edinburgh; Cornell University; Harvard University
- Website: www.drejtesia.gov.al/tedi-dobi

Tedi Dobi is an Albanian lawyer, who from April 2024 to November 2026 served as Deputy Minister of Justice of the Republic of Albania and Negotiator for Judiciary and Fundamental Rights during the process of integration of Albania to the European Union.

== Education ==
Tedi Dobi has completed primary and secondary education at the "Fan S. Noli" Secondary School in Tirana. He then completed high school at the Li Po Chun United World College, member of the United World Colleges network, in Hong Kong.

Dobi holds a dual Bachelor's degree in Law and Politics from the University of Edinburgh and a Master of Laws degree from Cornell University and has completed executive studies at Harvard University.

== Career ==
Tedi Dobi has served as high-level expert on the rule of law and European integration at the "Support to the EU Integration Process of Albania" (SEI) project, as well a number of European technical assistance projects, mainly in matters of corruption prevention, financial support through the Instrument of Pre-accession Assistance as well as control of compliance with the EU acquis, in support of the process of integration of Albania into the European Union.

Previously, Dobi has served in the position of Advisor at the Prime Minister Office, as part of the LEAD Albania program, where he was involved in the drafting and improvement of priority acts before their submission to the Council of Ministers, as well as the drafting and technical negotiation and deliberation on bilateral or multilateral international agreements.

During the years 2017 to 2021, Dobi was engaged as national legal expert of the EURALIUS project in the drafting and implementation of the Justice Reform, being involved in the drafting of legal initiatives in the fields of civil and administrative law, prevention of corruption and money laundering, organization and professional discipline, free legal professions, arbitration as well as free legal assistance.

At the same time, he supported change management and strengthening the capacities of the Inspection and Codification Directorates of the Ministry of Justice, as well as has supported the process of reorganization of the work in the Supreme Court in the direction of a more efficient structure and effective backlog reduction procedures.

Dobi has served as an adjunct lecturer at the University of Tirana for courses in ‘‘Social Security Law’’ and ‘’Business Law’’ and is a trainer in areas such as business law, professional practice, ethics and discipline, as well as legislative techniques for the drafting of normative acts as well as for acts aligning with the EU acquis.

== Publications ==
- Dobi, Tedi. Ciubotaru, Cristina (2024). "Albanian Corruption Proofing Methodology of the Assembly of Albania".
- Dobi, Tedi (red.) (2021). "Manual for Drafting Legislation". 3rd edition.

== See also ==
- Council of Ministers of Albania
- Ministry of Justice of Albania
- 21517 Dobi
