= Bora Muzhaqi =

Albanian politician (born 1990)

Minister of State for Youth and Children
- In office 18 September 2021 – 19 September 2025
- President: Ilir Meta; Bajram Begaj
- Prime Minister: Edi Rama

Personal details
- Born: 11 March 1990 (age 36) Elbasan, Albania
- Party: Socialist Party
- Education: London School of Economics; Hult International Business School
- Cabinet: Rama Cabinet (III)

Bora Muzhaqi (Albanian pronunciation: [ˈbɔɾa muˈʒaci]; born 11 March 1990) is an Albanian politician. She served as the Minister of State for Youth and Children in the Albanian government from her appointment on 10 September 2021 until September 2025. Muzhaqi graduated with a degree in economics in 2012 from the London School of Economics and Political Science in London, and then went on to study for a master's degree, also in London, at Hult International Business School, in the field of International Business.
