= Archeological Service Agency (Albania) =

Government agency of Albania

- Agjencia e Shërbimit Arkeologjik
- Official logo

Archeological agency overview
- Formed: 21 May 2008
- Jurisdiction: Albania
- Headquarters: Tirana
- Archeological agency executive: Roland Olli, Director General
- Website: www.asha.gov.al

The Archeological Service Agency (ASHA; Albanian: Agjencia e Shërbimit Arkeologjik) is a government agency under the supervision of the Albanian Ministry of Culture. The agency's role is to focus on the protection of the archeological heritage in Albania, affected by natural disasters, informal construction activity and archeological findings.
