= Arbjan Mazniku =

Albanian politician (born 1978)

Minister of State for Local Government
- In office 13 September 2023 – 19 September 2025
- President: Bajram Begaj
- Prime Minister: Edi Rama
- Succeeded by: Ervin Demo

Member of the Albanian Parliament
- Incumbent
- Assumed office 10 September 2025
- Constituency: Elbasan County

Deputy Mayor of Tirana
- In office 21 July 2015 – 12 September 2023

Deputy Minister of Education and Sports
- In office 1 October 2013 – 10 July 2015

Personal details
- Born: November 6, 1978 (age 47) Tirana, PR Albania
- Party: Socialist Party of Albania
- Education: University of Tirana; University of Sheffield
- Occupation: Politician

Arbjan Mazniku (born November 6, 1978) is an Albanian politician and government official. He served as Deputy Mayor of Tirana from 2015 to 2023 and as Minister of State for Local Government in the third Rama government from September 2023 until September 2025. As of May 2025, he was the Socialist Party’s political leader and candidate for the Elbasan region, and was elected as Member of Parliament for the same constituency.

== Early life and education ==
Arbjan Mazniku holds a degree in Journalism from the University of Tirana and a Master’s degree in Political Communication from the University of Sheffield in the United Kingdom.

From 2003 to 2007, Mazniku was active in the MJAFT! movement, a civic initiative focused on youth engagement and promoting good governance in Albania. Prior to that, he served as director of the National Debate Association, where he coordinated debate programs for secondary schools and universities.

== Career ==
Prior to entering public service, Mazniku served as Executive Director of the AGENDA Institute, a policy analysis organization in Albania focused on governance, European integration, and socioeconomic development.

Mazniku was Deputy Minister of Education and Sports from 2013 to 2015. From 2015 to 2023, he held the role of Deputy Mayor of Tirana.

In September 2023, Mazniku was appointed Minister of State for Local Government in the Rama III Government, replacing the state service standards minister post.

As of May 2025, Mazniku was the political leader of the Socialist Party for the Elbasan region.

=== Controversy over municipal spending ===
Mazniku has faced allegations of conflict of interest related to a restaurant co-owned by his wife. The restaurant received municipal payments for official events while Mazniku was Deputy Mayor of Tirana. Ownership records listed his wife, Marinela Lika, and Besa Fuga, wife of government PR chief Endri Fuga, as equal shareholders. Further scrutiny emerged over public procurement contracts awarded to entities linked to the resaurant, including a company formerly co-founded by the restaurant's chef and administrator. One such company, 3i-Solutions, secured contracts from municipally owned entities while Mazniku served as Chairman of the Supervisory Board of Tirana DC.

Mazniku denied any involvement in operational decisions or procurement processes related to either the restaurant or Tirana DC, stating he was unaware of the events held there or the procedures followed.
