= Iljas Reka =

Albanian politician (1924–1975)

Minister of Agriculture of Albania
- In office 5 July 1950 – 6 September 1951

Speaker of the Parliament of Albania
- In office 25 September 1973 – 27 December 1975

Personal details
- Born: December 6, 1924 Rekë, Dibër, North Macedonia (then Yugoslavia)
- Died: December 27, 1975 (aged 51) Durrës, Albania

Iljas Reka (6 December 1924 – 27 December 1975) was an Albanian politician. He served as Chairman of the Assembly of the Republic of Albania from 25 September 1973 to 27 December 1975.

== Life ==
Iljas Reka was born on December 6, 1924, in the region of Rekë, Dibër (present day North Macedonia). In 1943 he became a member of the Communist Party and subsequently joined the partisan group of Pezë, with the 22nd Brigade (8th and 4th divisions). From 1947 to 1948, he served as Deputy Minister of Agriculture. In the period between 1948–1949 and 1951–1974, he served as the first secretary of the Labor Party Committee in Durrës. In 1949–1950, he was appointed instructor in the branch organization of the Central Committee. Later from 1950–1951, Reka was promoted to Minister of Agriculture. In 1974–1975, he served as first secretary of the Party Committee in Lushnje. During this time, from 1973 to 1975, he was named Chairman of the People's Assembly. Reka died in Durrës on December 27, 1975.
