= Elva Margariti =

Albanian politician (born 1980)

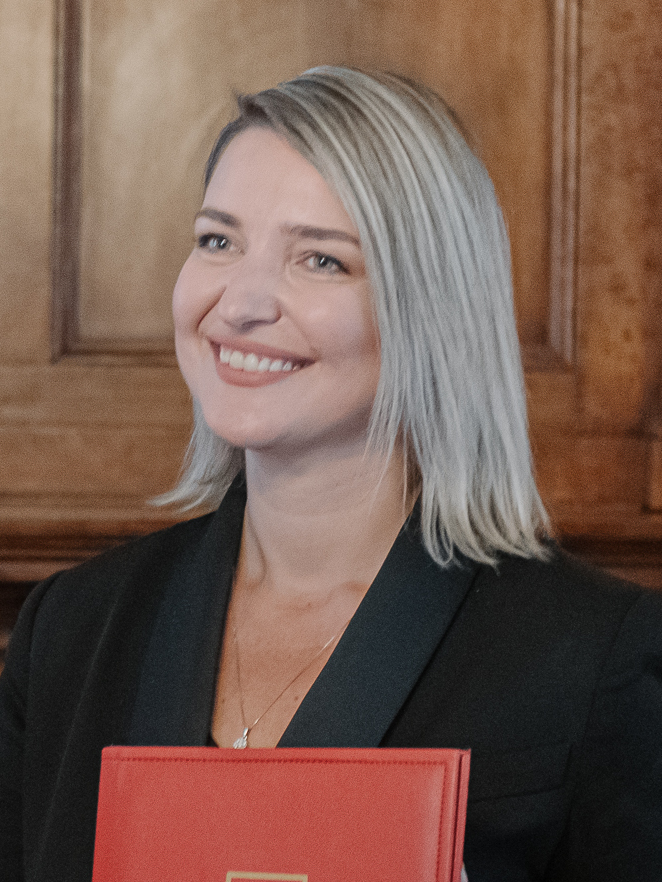
- Margariti in 2021

34th Minister of Culture
- In office 17 January 2019 – 8 January 2024
- President: Ilir Meta
- Prime Minister: Edi Rama
- Preceded by: Mirela Kumbaro
- Succeeded by: Blendi Gonxhja

Personal details
- Born: 14 June 1980 (age 45) Tirana, People's Socialist Republic of Albania
- Party: Socialist Party
- Children: 1 (daughter)

Elva Margariti (born 14 June 1980) is an Albanian state official, architect and urban planner. From 17 January 2019 to January 2024, she served as the Minister of Culture in the Rama II and III Governments.

== Biography ==
Elva Margariti was born on 14 June 1980 in Tirana. She completed her undergraduate studies in architecture at the University of Florence, Italy in the field of design, requalification and revitalization of built spaces and bio-architecture. In 2008, Mrs. Margariti was licensed under the Order of the Architect in Florence, where she practiced for several years in the field of architecture and urban planning.

From 2015 to 2018, she worked as a didactic coordinator at the Catholic university Our Lady of Good Counsel. In June 2018, she was entrusted with the task of territorial advisor and national coordinator for the Integrated Rural Development Program, better known as the "100 Villages Program", in the Prime Minister's cabinet.

Margariti was appointed Minister of Culture on 17 January 2019, following a wave of changes within the cabinet of Edi Rama as a result of the student protests the previous month. What started as a simple complaint to remove the standard fee on overdue exams, escalated with demands for increasing the budget on education and improving living conditions in the student dormitories. Margariti replaced Mirela Kumbaro in this post, who headed the ministry from 2013 until the end of 2018.
