= Driving licence in Albania =

Leje Drejtimi
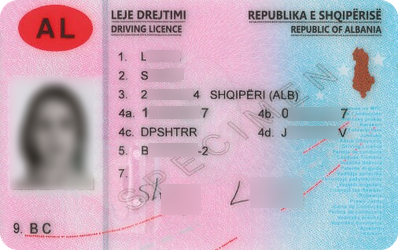
- View of the front

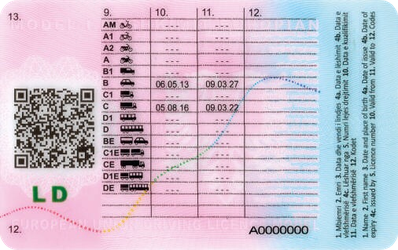
- View of the back
- Type: Driving licence
- Issued by: General Directorate of Road Transport Services
- First issued: 24 January 2017
- Purpose: Driving permit
- Valid in: Belgium, Croatia, Germany, Greece, Italy, Kosovo, Montenegro, North Macedonia, Saudi Arabia, Serbia, Turkey, United Arab Emirates.
- Expiration: 5–10 years
- Cost: 2,000-4,500 ALL

In Albania, the driving licence (Albanian: Leje Drejtimi) is the official document which authorizes an individual to drive a motor vehicle: motorbike, car, truck or bus. This driving permit can be obtained only after the successful passing of the theoretical exam on road code knowledge followed by the practical exam which tests an individual's on the road driving skills. The license is issued by the General Directorate of Road Transport Services.

== Physical characteristics ==
The physical characteristics of the driving licence are in conformity with the ISO 7810 and ISO 7816-1 standards. The card is made of a polycarbonate material. It has the following dimensions:

- length: 85,60 mm
- height: 53,98 mm
- thickness: 0,76 mm/± 0,8 mm
- rounded corner: radius 3,18 mm/± 0,30 mm

== Security features ==
- Diffractive watermark achr.
- Oblique angle feature
- Surface relief effect
- Color effect
- Dynamic color effect
- Guilloche colorful
- Image flip
- Fine line movement colorful
- Static matte effect
- Achromatic microtext - 250 pm
- Nanotext - 75 pm

== Validity and renewal ==
The validity of driving licences for categories A1, A2, A, B1, B and BE is limited to 15 years. The validity of driving licences for categories C1, C1E, C, CE, D1, D1E, D, DE is limited to 5 years. A medical test is required for renewal after the expiration of the validity term.

== License categories ==
Class	Description
AM	Mopeds (two-wheel vehicles or three-wheel vehicles with a maximum design speed of not more than 45 km/h, excluding those with a maximum design speed under or equal to 25 km/h, and light quadricycles).
A1	Motorcycles with a cylinder capacity not exceeding 125 cubic centimetres, of a power not exceeding 11 kW and with a power/weight ratio not exceeding 0,1 kW/kg, - motor tricycles with a power not exceeding 15 kW.
A2	Motorcycles of a power not exceeding 35 kW and with a power/weight ratio not exceeding 0,2 kW/kg and not derived from a vehicle of more than double its power.
A	Motorcycles; - motor tricycles with a power exceeding 15 kW. The minimum age for motor tricycles exceeding 15 kW is fixed at 21 years.
B1	Quadricycles, other than AM, with power output up to 15 kW, net weight up to 400 kg or 550 kg if they're designed for carrying goods. While calculating the net weight of electric vehicles, battery weight shall not be taken into account.
B	Motor vehicles with a maximum authorised mass not exceeding 3500 kg and designed and constructed for the carriage of no more than eight passengers in addition to the driver; motor vehicles in this category may be combined with a trailer having a maximum authorised mass which does not exceed 750 kg.
B (Code 96)	A combination of vehicles consisting of a tractor vehicle in category B and a trailer or semi-trailer has a maximum authorised mass of over 750 kg provided that the authorised mass of the combination does not exceed 4250 kg.
BE	A combination of vehicles consisting of a tractor vehicle in category B and a trailer or semi-trailer where the maximum authorised mass of the trailer or semi-trailer does not exceed 3500 kg.
C1	Motor vehicles other than those in categories D1 or D, the maximum authorised mass of which exceeds 3500 kg, but does not exceed 7500 kg, and which are designed and constructed for the carriage of no more than eight passengers in addition to the driver; motor vehicles in this category may be combined with a trailer having a maximum authorised mass not exceeding 750 kg.
C1E	Combinations of vehicles where the tractor vehicle is in category C1 and its trailer or semi-trailer has a maximum authorised mass of over 750 kg provided that the authorised mass of the combination does not exceed 12000 kg; - combinations of vehicles where the tractor vehicle is in category B and its trailer or semi-trailer has an authorised mass of over 3500 kg, provided that the authorised mass of the combination does not exceed 12000 kg.
C	Motor vehicles other than those in categories D1 or D, whose maximum authorised mass is over 3500 kg and which are designed and constructed for the carriage of no more than eight passengers in addition to the driver; motor vehicles in this category may be combined with a trailer having a maximum authorised mass which does not exceed 750 kg.
CE	Combinations of vehicles where the tractor vehicle is in category C and its trailer or semi-trailer has a maximum authorised mass of over 750 kg.
D1	Motor vehicles designed and constructed for the carriage of no more than 16 passengers in addition to the driver and with a maximum length not exceeding 8 m; motor vehicles in this category may be combined with a trailer having a maximum authorised mass not exceeding 750 kg.
D1E	Combinations of vehicles where the tractor vehicle is in category D1 and its trailer has a maximum authorised mass of over 750 kg.
D	Motor vehicles designed and constructed for the carriage of more than eight passengers in addition to the driver; motor vehicles which may be driven with a category D licence may be combined with a trailer having a maximum authorized mass which does not exceed 750 kg.
DE	Combinations of vehicles where the tractor vehicle is in category D and its trailer has a maximum authorised mass of over 750 kg.

== See also ==
- Albanian identity card
- Vehicle registration plates of Albania
- Border crossings of Albania
