= Minister of State for Local Governance (Albania) =

Former ministerial post in the Albanian Government

Minister of State for Local Government
- Ministër i Shtetit për Pushtetin Vendor

Ministerial post overview
- Formed: 13 September 2023
- Dissolved: 11 September 2026
- Jurisdiction: Council of Ministers
- Headquarters: Tirana, Albania

The Minister of State for Local Government (Albanian: Ministër i Shtetit për Pushtetin Vendor) was a ministerial post of the Albanian Government responsible for Local Governance and Territorial Administrative Reform.

On 11 September 2026, the local government portfolio was merged into the Ministry of Internal Affairs, with its responsibilities transferred to the ministry under Ervin Demo.

== Officeholders (2013–2026) ==
No.	Name	Term in office
1	Bledar Çuçi	15 September 2013	19 March 2017
2	Eduard Shalsi	24 March 2017	13 September 2017
3	Arbjan Mazniku	13 September 2023	19 September 2025
4	Ervin Demo	19 September 2025	11 September 2026

== See also ==
- Municipalities of Albania
