= Florjon Mima =

Albanian politician

Florjon Mima MP

Member of the Albanian Parliament for Durrës
- In office 9 September 2017 – 18 February 2019

Minister of Economy, Trade and Energy
- In office 4 April 2013 – 16 September 2013
- Prime Minister: Sali Berisha
- Preceded by: Edmond Haxhinasto
- Succeeded by: Damian Gjiknuri

Personal details
- Born: 2 March 1962 (age 64) Tirana, Albania
- Party: Democratic
- Education: University of Tirana

Florjon Mima (born 2 March 1962) is an Albanian politician. He is a member of the Assembly of the Republic of Albania for the Democratic Party of Albania.
