= Delina Fico =

Albanian civil society activist

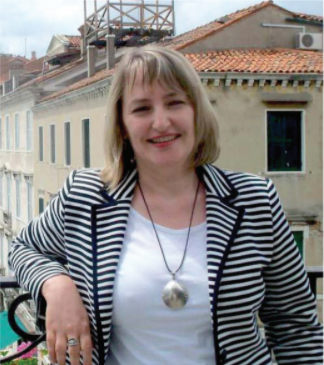
Delina Fico

Delina Fico is an Albanian civil society activist whose work primarily focuses on subjects of advocacy, gender issues, LGBTQ advocacy, community development, and public education. Fico's work has sought to form Non-governmental organization networks (NGOs) and increase cooperation between women's rights groups.

== Advocacy work ==
Delina Fico has served on the Board of the Shelter for LGBTI Persons, the Network of East West Women (NEWW), Open Society Foundation for Albania, Kosova Women's Network, led the Women's Economic and Political Empowerment Program, and is the current Director of Civil Society Programs at East West Management Institute Inc.

=== Women's rights ===
Fico's work has centered on women rights and efforts to establish networks between women's rights NGOs. According to Fico, Post-Soviet women's organizations have been "hesitant" to unify under umbrella organizations, citing previous attempts by of Albania's Gender in Development organization in 1994.

Fico is a proponent of Caroline Moser's Gender and Planning Framework, and has worked to implement a similar framework in Albanian law.

== Personal life ==
Fico was formerly engaged to Albanian Socialist President and current Albanian Prime Minister Edi Rama. She is currently married to Albanian politician Bledar Çuçi.
