= Damian Gjiknuri =

Albanian politician (born 1972)

Minister of Energy and Industry
- In office 15 September 2013 – 13 September 2017
- President: Ilir Meta
- Prime Minister: Edi Rama

Ministry of Infrastructure and Energy
- In office 13 September 2017 – 17 January 2019
- Prime Minister: Edi Rama
- Preceded by: Sokol Dervishaj
- Succeeded by: Belinda Balluku

Personal details
- Born: 25 May 1972 (age 53) Tirana, Albania
- Party: Socialist Party

Damian Gjiknuri (born 25 May 1972) is an Albanian politician. He was a Minister of Energy and Industry and a member of the Albanian parliament for the Socialist Party, chosen in the District of Elbasan. He is member of Commission of Legal Affairs at the Parliament.

== Early life ==
Gjiknuri was born in Tirana. His father is from Kudhës, Himarë, and his mother is from Elbasan. His father has been a professor and member of the parliament, as well as one of the leaders of environment movements and organizations in Albania. "Sami Frashëri" was his high-school, and he graduated with excellent merits.

== Professional career ==
Gjiknuri completed his university at the Law Faculty in Tirana at 1994 and University of Leiden, The Netherlands. He has a MA for Public Policies in the United States, at Naval Postgraduate School, Monterey CA, mainly focusing in fields of war against terrorism and national security, as well as an LL.M. (Master of Laws in International Law) in London, in 1997. He has worked as director of foreign relations department at the Albanian Ministry of Interior at 1999-2001; and as General Secretary of the Ministry of Defense from 2001–2004, and on 2005 as Chief of Cabinet of Minister of Interior. At the same time, he has been senior member of the Albanian National Group Against Terrorism. Since 2005, he has been a managing partner of DG consulting, a legal studio in Tirana.

== Political career ==
He was chosen as "vice-secretary for legal affairs" of SPA in July 2007 and was one of the authors of new Electoral Code in 2008. He became a member of parliament on June 28, 2009. He is a member of the Commission of Legal Affairs. In December 2011 Gjiknuri was elected Secretary for Electoral Affairs of the SP, and was the co-chair of the Electoral Reform Commission, e reform which was completed in July 2012. Prior to June 28, 2009, some people expected him to become the next Minister of Defense.

Gjiknuri has served as the Minister of Energy and Industry, and Infrastructure and Energy from 2013 until 2019. During the year 2019/2020 Gjiknuri led the electoral reform which was finalised with the change of the Albanian Constitution. From September 2021 Gjiknuri is the General Secretary of the Socialist Party of Albania.
