= Blendi Gonxhja =

Albanian politician

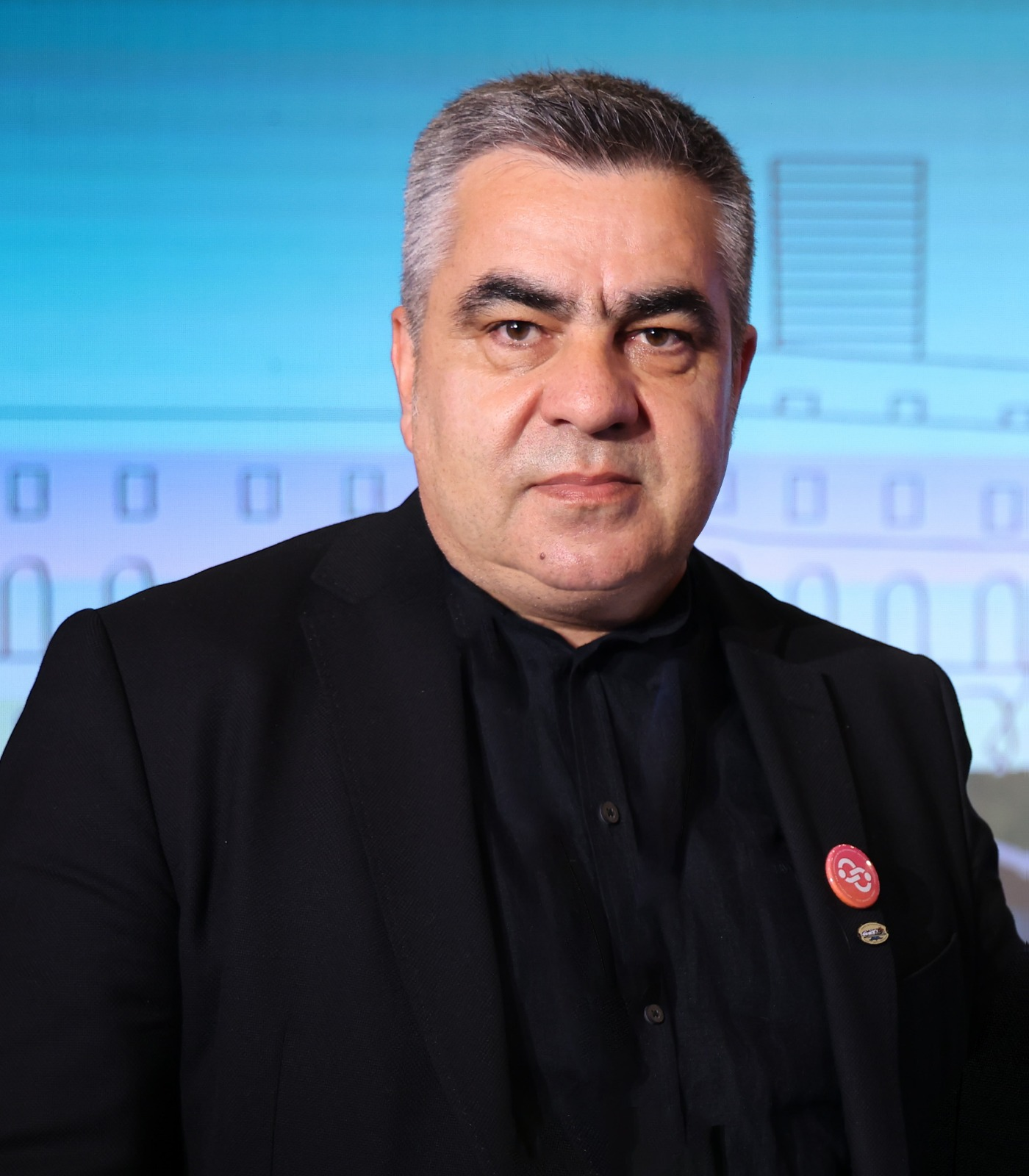
- Gonxhja in 2024

Minister of Tourism, Culture and Sports
- Incumbent
- Assumed office 12 January 2024
- President: Bajram Begaj
- Prime Minister: Edi Rama
- Preceded by: Delina Ibrahimaj; Elva Margariti

Member of the Albanian Parliament
- Incumbent
- Assumed office 11 September 2025
- Constituency: Tirana County

General Director of the General Directorate of Road Transport Services
- In office 15 September 2013 – 11 January 2024
- Preceded by: Arben Isaraj
- Succeeded by: Ilir Mëngra

Personal details
- Born: 15 June 1970 (age 56) Tirana, Albania
- Party: Socialist Party of Albania

Blendi Gonxhja (born 15 June 1970) is an Albanian politician, public administrator and member of the Socialist Party. He has served as the Minister of Tourism, Culture and Sports of Albania since January 2024, under Prime Minister Edi Rama.

He previously held a variety of leadership roles in local and national government, including as Director of the General Directorate of Road Transport Services (DPSHTRR), Deputy Mayor of Tirana and director of several urban development agencies.

== Early life and education ==
Blendi Gonxhja was born in Tirana, People's Socialist Republic of Albania. He graduated from the Jordan Misja Artistic Lyceum in 1989 and continued his studies at the High Institute of Arts (now the University of Arts), earning his degree in 1993.

In 1996, Gonxhja was awarded a Fulbright Scholarship and pursued graduate studies in Eastern European politics and culture at the University of Michigan.

== Political activism ==
Gonxhja became publicly active during the early 1990s as a student leader during the democratic movement that helped overthrow Albania’s communist regime. He was among the co-founders of the first post-communist opposition party and a participant in the protests of 1990–1991.

In July 1996, he testified before the United States Commission on Civil Rights about the situation in Albania. That same year, he led or co-founded several civil society organizations, including the Albanian Youth Federation, the Student Council and the Swiss School Aid Foundation (SAA). He also worked as a cultural coordinator for the first Peace Corps mission in Albania.

== Career ==
=== Early public service (1998–2003) ===
In 1998, Gonxhja was appointed Chief of Cabinet at the Ministry of Culture, Youth and Sports, serving under Minister Edi Rama. In 2000, he became Deputy Mayor of Tirana, working on urban planning and administrative modernization.

After leaving public service in 2003, Gonxhja worked as an advisor to the Rothschild and Packard Foundations and later became an entrepreneur in the private transport sector in both Albania and Greece.

=== Urban development leadership (2015–2018) ===
In 2015, Gonxhja returned to the public sector, first as Director of the Tirana Municipal Services Enterprise (Albanian: Ndërmarrja Nr. 1) and shortly afterward as head of the newly created Agency for Parks and Recreation (Albanian: Agjencia e Parqeve dhe Rekreacionit).

During this time, he led several high-profile urban improvement projects, including the revitalization of the Artificial Lake Park of Tirana and the creation of new public green spaces.

=== Director of Road Transport Services (2018–2024) ===
From November 2018 to January 2024, Gonxhja served as Director of the General Directorate of Road Transport Services (DPSHTRR), a central agency within the Ministry of Infrastructure and Energy.

His tenure was marked by the full digitalization of administrative services, the modernization of transport centers, improved transparency and infrastructure and the introduction of environmental and e-mobility reforms.

He co-founded the RETRO Albania – Collection of Historical Vehicles, which became the country’s first officially recognized historic vehicle registry and was accepted as a full member of the International Federation of Historic Vehicles (FIVA).

=== Minister of Economy, Culture and Innovation ===
On 12 January 2024, Gonxhja was appointed the inaugural Minister of Economy, Culture and Innovation. The position was created through a government restructuring that merged the former Ministries of Economy and Culture into a unified portfolio focusing on innovation, creativity and digital transformation.

He succeeded outgoing ministers Elva Margariti and Delina Ibrahimaj.

== Personal life ==
Gonxhja is fluent in Albanian, English and Greek. He is married and has children. Gonxhja is a devoted fan of Italian football club Inter Milan, often displaying his support for the club in public and on social media.

== See also ==
- Socialist Party of Albania
- DPSHTRR
