= Enea Karakaçi =

Albanian politician

Minister of Infrastructure and Energy
- Incumbent
- Assumed office 6 March 2026
- President: Bajram Begaj
- Prime Minister: Edi Rama
- Preceded by: Belinda Balluku

Personal details
- Party: Socialist Party of Albania
- Education: University of Tirana; University of Amsterdam
- Occupation: Politician

Enea Karakaçi is an Albanian politician serving as the Minister of Infrastructure and Energy of Albania since 6 March 2026.

== Career ==
Karakaçi served as Administrator of the state-owned electricity distribution operator Operatori i Shpërndarjes së Energjisë Elektrike (OSHEE Group) from 2023.

In March 2026, he was appointed Minister of Infrastructure and Energy, succeeding Belinda Balluku.
