= National Food Authority (Albania) =

Government agency of Albania

- Autoriteti Kombëtar i Ushqimit

Food agency overview
- Formed: 2009; 17 years ago
- Headquarters: Stavri Themeli Street, Tirana
- Food agency executive: Robert Lili, Director
- Parent Food agency: Ministry of Agriculture and Rural Development
- Website: aku.gov.al

The National Food Authority (AKU) (Albanian: Autoriteti Kombëtar i Ushqimit) is a government agency under the supervision of the Albanian Ministry of Agriculture and Rural Development. The agency is responsible for ensuring the food security of the country and the stability of supply and price of food.
