= Andis Salla =

Albanian politician (born 1988)

Minister of Agriculture and Rural Development
- Incumbent
- Assumed office 19 September 2025
- President: Bajram Begaj
- Prime Minister: Edi Rama
- Preceded by: Anila Denaj

Mayor of Cërrik
- In office 1 August 2019 – 11 September 2025
- Preceded by: Altin Toska
- Succeeded by: Florenc Doka

Personal details
- Born: 3 February 1988 (age 38) Shtërmen, Elbasan PSR Albania
- Party: Socialist Party of Albania
- Education: University of Tirana
- Profession: Politician, lawyer

Andis Salla (born 3 February 1988) is an Albanian politician and lawyer. Since September 2025, he has served as the Minister of Agriculture and Rural Development of Albania.

== Early life and education ==
Salla was born in Shtërmen, Elbasan, on 3 February 1988. He graduated from the Faculty of Law at the University of Tirana in 2011, specializing in Criminal Law. Since 2014, he has been a qualified lawyer registered with the National Chamber of Advocacy.

== Career ==
Before joining the national government, Salla served as Mayor of Cërrik. During his mandate, he worked on rural development initiatives and public infrastructure projects.

He also held the position of Director of the Institution for the Execution of Criminal Decisions (IEVP) in Elbasan.
