= Adea Pirdeni =

Albanian politician

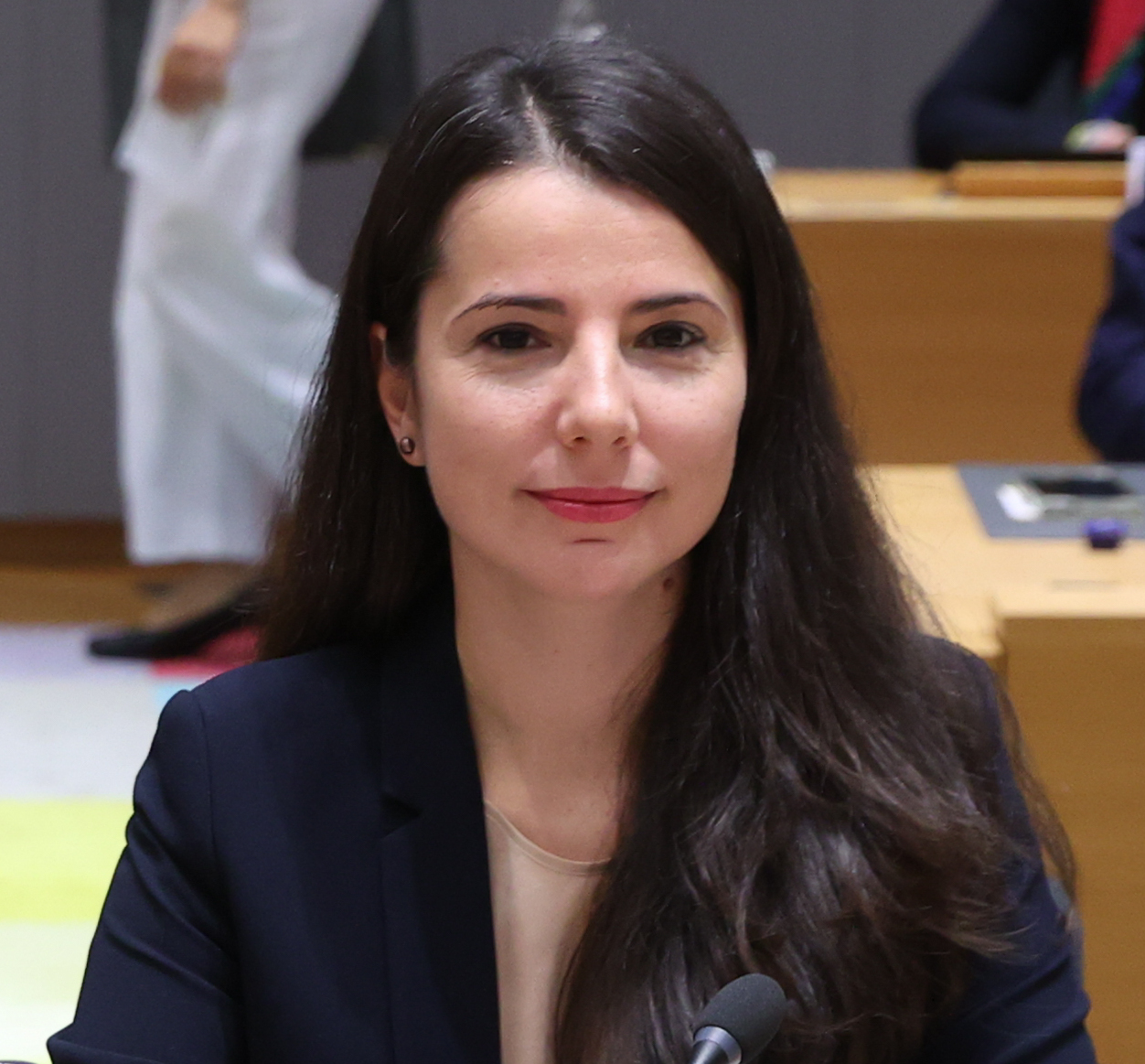
- Pirdeni in 2024

Ministry for Public Administration and Anti-Corruption
- Incumbent
- Assumed office 15 January 2024
- President: Bajram Begaj
- Prime Minister: Edi Rama

Deputy Minister of Justice
- In office 9 September 2020 – 12 January 2024
- Preceded by: Fjoralba Caka
- Succeeded by: Tedi Dobi

Personal details
- Born: 1 October 1983 (age 42) Tirana, Albania
- Education: University of Tirana
- Alma mater: University of Oxford
- Occupation: Politician, Lecturer

Adea Pirdeni (born 1 October 1983) is an Albanian politician who has served as the Minister of State for Public Administration and Anti-Corruption of Albania since January 2024.

== Early life ==
Adea Pirdeni studied law at the University of Tirana and the University of Oxford. She holds a PhD since 2016.

== Political career ==
Adea Pirdeni is a lecturer since 2008 at the university of Tirana where she teaches constitutional law, European Union law, and administrative law.

In September 2020, she is deputy Minister of Justice and deputy chief negotiator in charge of the negotiations for the Judiciary and Fundamental Rights to prepare the accession of Albania to the European Union.

On 10 January 2024, she was proposed to be Minister of State for Public Administration and Anti-Corruption in the Rama III Government and officially named on 15 January 2024.
