= Ministry of State for Standards and Services (Albania) =

Government ministry of Albania

Minister of State for Standards and Services
- Ministër i Shtetit për Standartert dhe Shërbimet

Department overview
- Formed: 18 September 2021
- Jurisdiction: Council of Ministers
- Headquarters: Tirana, Albania
- Minister responsible: Milva Ekonomi

The office of the Minister of State for Standards and Services (Albanian: Ministër i Shtetit për Standartet dhe Shërbimet) is a department of the Albanian Government that in cooperation with other responsible institutions, drafts, coordinates and implements state policies aimed at high standards of public services, which improve the lives of Albanian citizens. These policies facilitate the provision of public services by ensuring their quality, affordability and increase effectiveness which guarantee access to all citizens who receive public services. The current minister is Milva Ekonomi.
