= Minister of State for Youth and Children (Albania) =

Government ministry of Albania

- Ministër i Shtetit për Rininë dhe Fëmijët

Ministerial post overview
- Formed: 18 September 2021
- Jurisdiction: Council of Ministers
- Headquarters: Tirana, Albania
- Minister responsible: Bora Muzhaqi

The office of the Minister of State for Youth and Children (Albanian: Ministër i Shtetit për Rininë dhe Fëmijët) is a ministerial post of the Albanian Government focused on issues related to the youth and children. The department develops and monitors policies that safeguard the rights of young people, cooperating with organizations working on the respected field and with international youth exchange programs.The current minister is Bora Muzhaqi.
