= Toni Gogu =

Albanian politician and lawyer (born 1972)

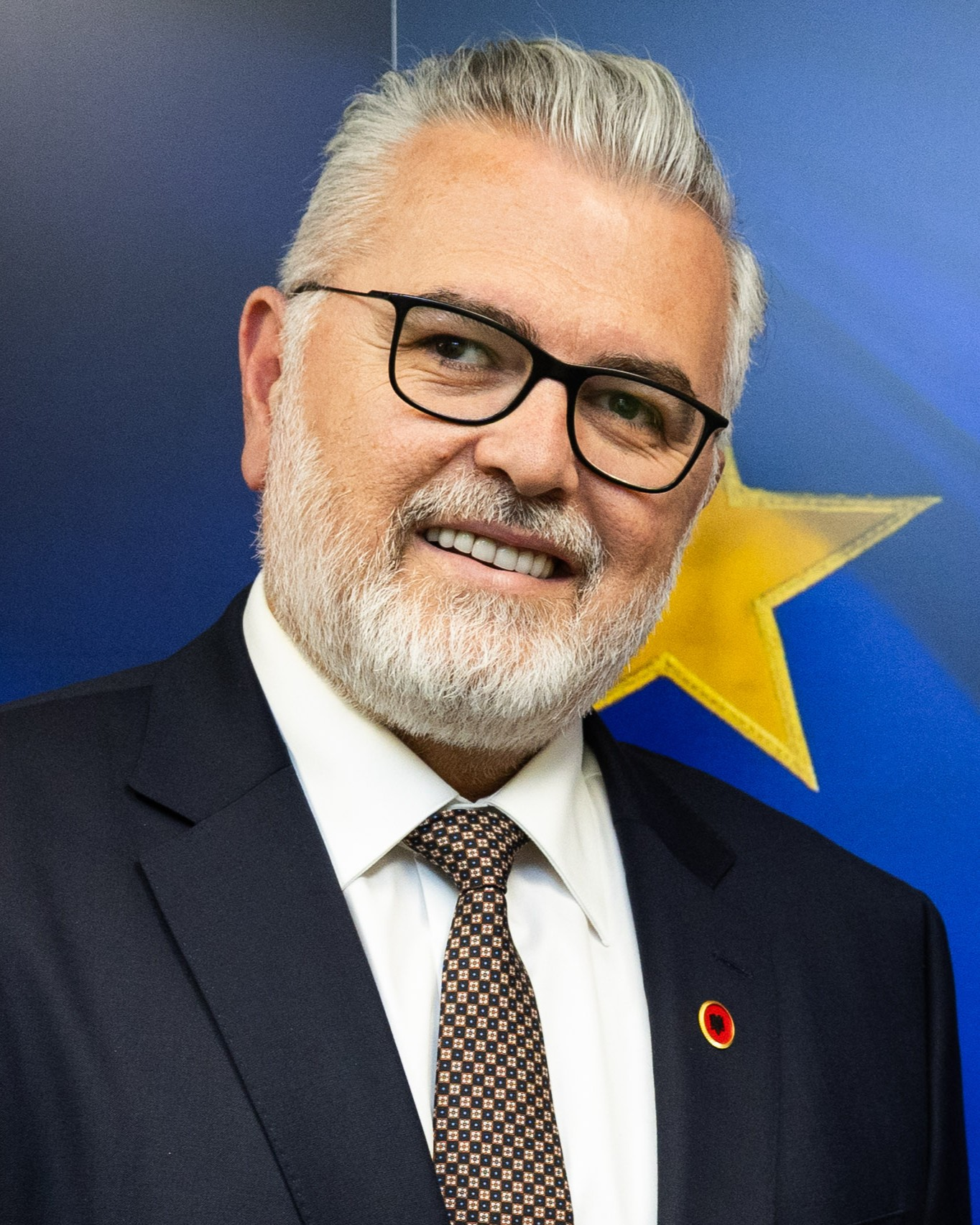

Minister of Justice of Albania
- Incumbent
- Assumed office 6 March 2026
- President: Bajram Begaj
- Prime Minister: Edi Rama
- Preceded by: Besfort Lamallari

Minister of State for Relations with Parliament
- In office 19 September 2025 – 6 March 2026
- Preceded by: Taulant Balla
- Succeeded by: Erjona Ismaili

Member of the Parliament of Albania
- In office 2021–2025

Personal details
- Born: 24 July 1972 (age 54) Fier, People's Republic of Albania
- Party: Socialist Party of Albania
- Education: University of Tirana
- Profession: Politician, lawyer

Toni Gogu (born Oltion Gogu; born 24 July 1972) is an Albanian lawyer, politician and former pastor serving as the Minister of Justice of Albania since 6 March 2026. He previously served as Minister of State for Relations with Parliament from 19 September 2025 to 6 March 2026, and was a member of the Parliament of Albania from 2021 to 2025.

== Early life and education ==
Gogu studied law at the University of Tirana, Faculty of Law, from 1990 to 1994. He later completed a master's degree in Public Law at the same faculty between 2004 and 2008.

== Professional career ==
From 2001 to 2005, he worked as Chancellor at the Tirana District Court. In 2005, he became Director of the Department of Scientific Research at the High Council of Justice, a position he held until September of that year.

Between 2005 and 2012, Gogu served as Director of the Legal Department at the Bank of Albania. From November 2012 to July 2015, he was the Director General of the Deposit Insurance Agency of Albania.

From September 2015 to October 2017, he was National Director of World Vision in the Western Balkans.

== Political career ==
In October 2017, Gogu was appointed Deputy Minister of Justice, a position he held until 2019. He then served as Chair of the Tirana Municipal Council from 2019 to September 2020.

From November 2020 to March 2021, he was Prefect of Tirana County.

In 2021, Gogu was elected as a Member of the Parliament of Albania, where he served until 2025. During his mandate, he was Deputy Chair of the Socialist Party Parliamentary Group. He was also Deputy Chair of the National Council for European Integration and participated in the work of the Stabilisation and Association Committee with the European Union.

In September 2025, Gogu was appointed Minister of State for Relations with the Parliament.
