= Taulant Balla =

Albanian politician (born 1977)

Taulant Balla MP
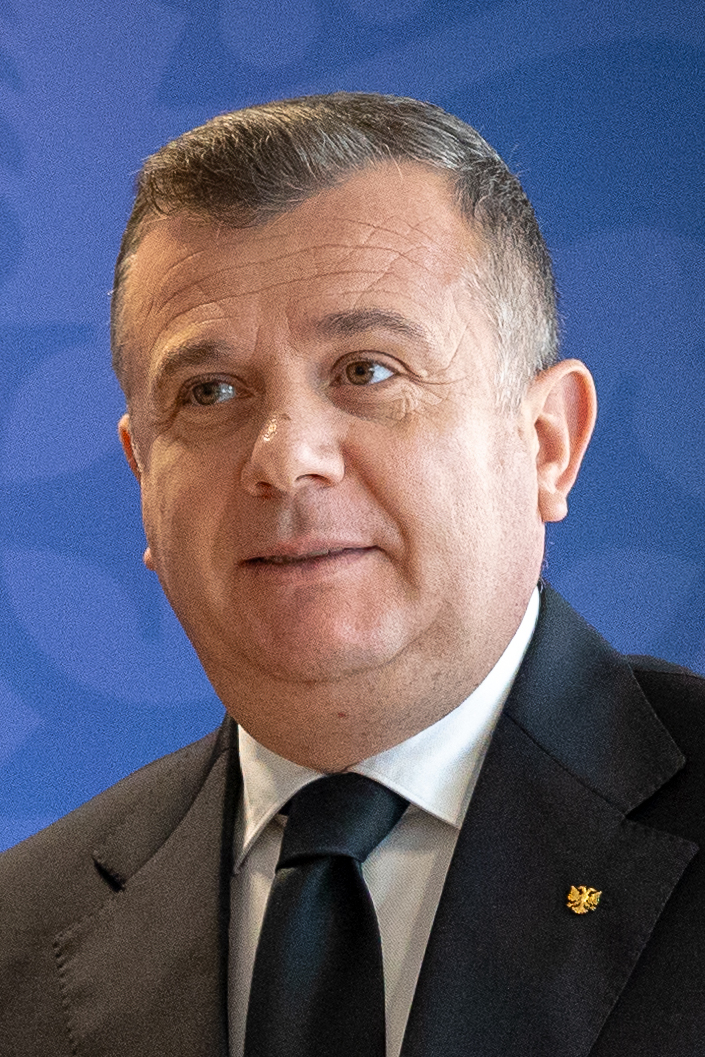
- Balla in 2023

Minister of State for Parliament Relations
- In office 30 July 2024 – 19 September 2025
- President: Bajram Begaj
- Prime Minister: Edi Rama
- Preceded by: Elisa Spiropali
- Succeeded by: Toni Gogu

Minister of Internal Affairs
- In office 8 July 2023 – 30 July 2024
- President: Bajram Begaj
- Prime Minister: Edi Rama
- Preceded by: Bledar Çuçi
- Succeeded by: Ervin Hoxha

Member of Albanian Parliament
- Incumbent
- Assumed office 3 July 2005
- Prime Minister: Fatos Nano

Personal details
- Born: 12 August 1977 (age 49) Lunik, Librazhd, PSR Albania
- Party: Socialist Party
- Education: Alexandru Ioan Cuza University

Taulant Balla (born 12 August 1977) is an Albanian politician. He served as the Minister of State for Parliament Relations of Albania from July 2024 to September 2025. Previously he was Minister of Internal Affairs from July 2023 to July 2024. He is a member of the Socialist Party of Albania, and has served as a Member of the Albanian Parliament (MP) representing Librazhd since the 2005 general election. Balla has also held senior roles within the party, including General Secretary and Parliamentary Group Leader.

== Political career ==
=== Political activities ===
He was first elected MP in the 2005 general election and then for two other legislatures successively as a member of the parliamentary group of the Socialist Party.

He is the political leader for the Socialist Party in Fier.

In 2020, Balla proposed a measure to adopt the International Holocaust Remembrance Alliance’s definition of anti-Semitism and promise to fight anti-Jewish prejudice. The measure was accepted unanimously by the Parliament of Albania, and Albania became the first Muslim country to formally adopt the definition.

=== Plagiarism assertion ===
In October 2018, many Albanian public figures and politicians were alleged to have been part of a plagiarism scandal, involving their Masters and Ph.D. theses. The assertions were begun by Taulant Muka, a young epidemiologist educated in the Netherlands. The assertions sparked nationwide protests from students of public universities, leading to a vetting for all academic titles held by public figures, state officials, and politicians. The PhD thesis of Balla, entitled The Reform of Decision-Making System in the European Union, supervised by Professor George Poede at Alexandru Ioan Cuza University in Iaşi, Romania, was named in the scandal. In 2019, following an accusation of plagiarism, the university forwarded the charge to the consultative body of the ministry of national education that investigates such accusations.

== Personal life ==
Balla is married to Iris Pekmezi and has two children, a boy, Robin and a girl, Melani. Balla is a supporter of German football club Bayern Munich.
