= Majlinda Dhuka =

Albanian politician

Minister of State and Chief Negotiator
- Incumbent
- Assumed office 12 September 2025
- President: Bajram Begaj
- Prime Minister: Edi Rama

Personal details
- Education: University of Tirana (Faculty of Law)
- Profession: Lawyer, lecturer
- Cabinet: Rama III Government

Majlinda Dhuka is an Albanian lawyer, lecturer and politician who has served as the Minister of State and Chief Negotiator of Albania, in the country's accession process to the European Union since 28 July 2022.

== Early life and education ==
Dhuka graduated from the Faculty of Law at the University of Tirana and holds a Master's degree in European Studies. She has undertaken further studies in European public law, international relations, and governance, attending programs at institutions such as the University of Athens and the Harvard Kennedy School.

== Career ==
Throughout her career, Dhuka has held several leadership roles as a civil servant, working in departments and directorates related to legislation, strategic development, and planning. She has also worked at the Municipality of Tirana and later held the role of Deputy Secretary General within the Council of Ministers.

== Academic work ==
In addition to her public service, Dhuka has also contributed to academia as a lecturer at the School of Magistrates and the Faculty of Law at the University of Tirana.
