= Anila Denaj =

Albanian politician

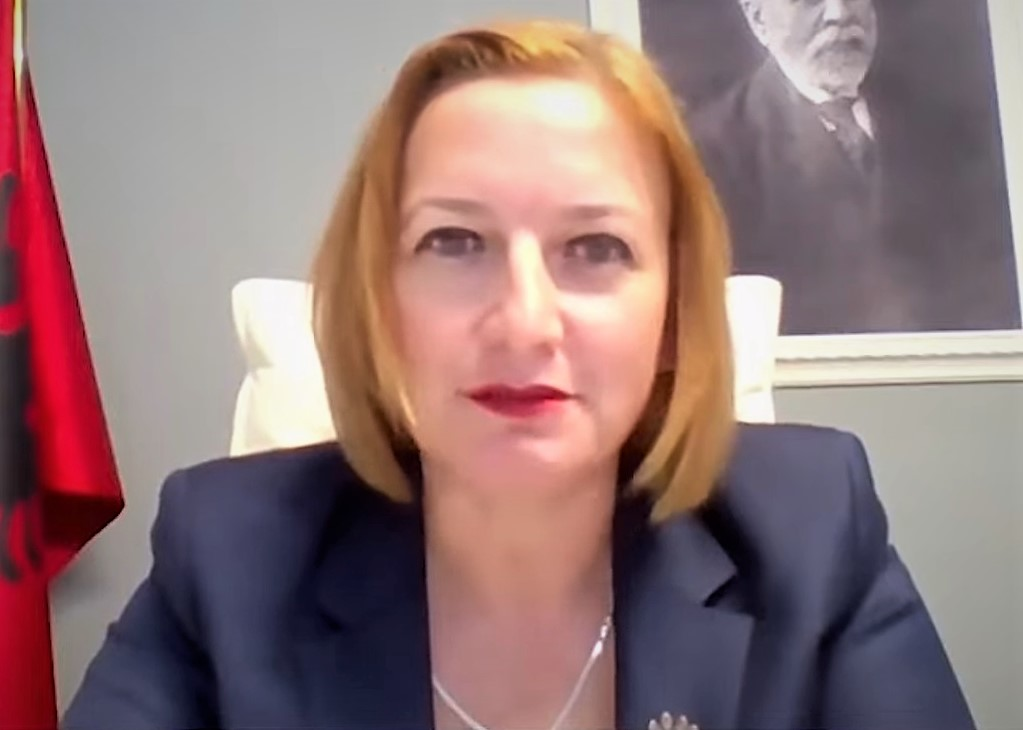
- Anila Denaj at World Economic Forum

Minister of Agriculture and Rural Development
- In office 11 September 2023 – 19 September 2025
- President: Bajram Begaj
- Prime Minister: Edi Rama
- Preceded by: Frida Krifca
- Succeeded by: Andis Salla

Member of the 31st Parliament of Albania
- Incumbent
- Assumed office 10 September 2021
- President: Ilir Meta
- Prime Minister: Edi Rama
- Parliamentary group: PS
- Constituency: Vlorë

Minister of Finances and Economy
- In office 17 January 2019 – 18 September 2021
- President: Ilir Meta
- Prime Minister: Edi Rama
- Preceded by: Arben Ahmetaj
- Succeeded by: Delina Ibrahimaj

Personal details
- Born: 18 September 1973 (age 53) Tirana, Albania
- Party: Socialist Party
- Education: University of Tirana

Anila Denaj (born 18 September 1973) is an Albanian politician who served as the Minister of Agriculture and Rural Development of Albania from September 2023 until September 2025.

== Early life and education ==
Denaj was born in Tirana and graduated from the Tirana University with a degree in Financial and Banking Management in 1995.

== Career ==
Denaj worked at ProCredit Banks in El Salvador, Bolivia, Ecuador, Romania and Mozambique. In October 2013, she became General Director of the Albanian Ministry of Finance. She has lectured in human resources management at the Public Administration School since 2014.

Denaj was appointed General Director of the Albanian Compulsory Health Care Security Fund in October 2018. Three months later, she was appointed Minister of Finance and Economy in a cabinet reshuffle by Prime Minister Edi Rama, replacing Arben Ahmetaj. In 2020, she introduced a number of measures aiming to assist the country's economy recover from the "two severe shocks" of the 2019 Albania earthquake and the COVID-19 pandemic.

In addition to her role in government, Denaj was a member of the World Bank Group’s (WBG) Advisory Council on Gender and Development.

== Other activities ==
- European Bank for Reconstruction and Development (EBRD), Ex-Officio Member of the Board of Governors (2019–2021)
- World Bank, Ex-Officio Member of the Board of Governors (2019–2021)

== Personal life ==
Denaj has one son.
