= Erjona Ismaili =

Albanian politician (born 1990)

Minister of State for Relations with Parliament
- Incumbent
- Assumed office 6 March 2026
- President: Bajram Begaj
- Prime Minister: Edi Rama
- Preceded by: Toni Gogu

Member of the Parliament of Albania
- Incumbent
- Assumed office 12 September 2025
- Constituency: Vlorë County

Personal details
- Born: 26 March 1990 (age 36) Sarandë, Albania
- Party: Socialist Party of Albania
- Education: University of Vlora; European University of Tirana
- Occupation: Politician

Erjona Ismaili (born 26 March 1990) is an Albanian politician serving as the Minister of State for Relations with Parliament of Albania since 6 March 2026. She has been a member of the Parliament of Albania since 2025.

== Early life and education ==
Ismaili was born on 26 March 1990 in Sarandë, Albania. She studied law at the University of Vlora and the European University of Tirana.

== Career ==
She was elected as a member of the Parliament of Albania representing the Socialist Party of Albania.

In February 2026, Prime Minister Edi Rama proposed her for the post of Minister of State for Relations with Parliament, and she took the oath of office before President Bajram Begaj on 6 March 2026.
