= UMT AG =

UMT United Mobility Technology AG
- Company type: Limited company (Aktiengesellschaft)
- ISIN: DE0005286108
- Industry: IT and Financial services
- Founded: 16 October 1989
- Headquarters: München, Germany
- Key people: Albert Wahl, (CEO); Alexander Viscount Franckenstein, (CBDO); Robert Schmiedler, (CTO); Erik Nagel, (CIO); Walter Raizner (Chairman)

UMT United Mobility Technology AG is a technology and financial services company based in Munich. The company develops services for mobile and electronic payment systems, based on its own Mobile Payment and Loyalty Platform. There is a co-operation agreement with Payback (bonus program), part of the American Express Group, since November 2014.

== Products and services ==
The UMT platform supports mobile operating systems like Apple iOS, Android (operating system) and Microsoft Windows Phone and uses different transaction technologies, such as near field communication, optical codes and bluetooth. The platform technology is licensed and marketed as white label. Based on the former initial product iPAYst, a digital wallet for mobile payments with smartphones, tablet computers and other mobile devices, the application is now mainly used for mobile payment and loyalty programs in the retail and hospitality industry by connecting merchants, loyalty schemes, payment service providers and the end consumer.

== Shareholdings ==
- UMS United Mobile Services, Munich
- IPAYst, Riga
- Mobile Payment System Espana, Barcelona
- Delinski, Vienna
- UMT Turkey Mobil, Istanbul
- SEKS, Barcelona
- UMT USA, Orange, California
- Peaches Mobile, prelado

== Listing ==
UMT's listing happened on the 30 September 2011 via a reverse IPO through former Leipziger Solarpark AG, going along with a change of name and business purpose.
