= Frida Krifca =

Albanian politician (born 1978)

Minister of Agriculture and Rural Development
- In office 18 September 2021 – 11 September 2023
- President: Ilir Meta; Bajram Begaj
- Prime Minister: Edi Rama
- Preceded by: Milva Ekonomi
- Succeeded by: Anila Denaj

Personal details
- Born: 20 March 1978 (age 48) Tirana, Albania
- Party: Socialist Party
- Children: 2
- Education: University of Tirana; University of Akron; Harvard Business School
- Alma mater: Faculty of Economics
- Occupation: Politician

Frida Krifca (born March 20, 1978) is an Albanian former politician. She served as the Minister of Agriculture in the Rama III Cabinet from September 2021 to September 2023.

== Early life ==
Frida Krifca was born on March 20, 1978, in Tirana, Albania. She attended University of Tirana in Faculty of Economics. After graduating she went on to study at University of Akron in Ohio, United States as well as Harvard Business School.

== Political career ==
Krifca has a 22 years of experience in administration and management, with a special focus on the development of the financial sector the use of financial services and business development, meeting national, international and international economic, legal and structural objectives. In July 2017 Frida has been managing the Agency of Agriculture and Rural Development (ARDA). She is responsible for administering state budget support schemes of farmes ensuring transparency and guaranteeing control mechanisms in investments and direct payments, which under its leadership are transferred to on-line processes and with zero documents. Previously she worked for 4 years as a Director of Albanian for Financial Services Volunteer Corps (FSVC), an NGO headquartered in New York. Prior to joining FSVC, she worked for Tirana Bank as Director of Marketing and Public Relations, after several years of experience in the field of management and strategies at Agna Group. In September 2021, she was appointed Minister of Agriculture after Milva Ekonomi by the Prime Minister of Albania, Edi Rama for his new cabinet Rama III.

== Personal life ==
Frida Krifca is married and has two girls.
