= Social Insurance Institute (Albania) =

Government agency of Albania

- Instituti i Sigurimeve Shoqërore
- Official logo

Social Insurance institute overview
- Formed: 28 October 1927 (98 years ago)
- Jurisdiction: Albania
- Headquarters: Tirana
- Social Insurance institute executive: Astrit Hado, Director General
- Website: www.issh.gov.al

The Social Insurance Institute (ISSH) (Albanian: Instituti i Sigurimeve Shoqërore) is an Albanian government agency that administers the coverage of pensions and other social insurance services in Albania.
