= Ministry of Agriculture and Rural Development (Albania) =

Government ministry of Albania

- Ministria e Bujqësisë, Zhvillimit Rural dhe Administrimit të Ujërave

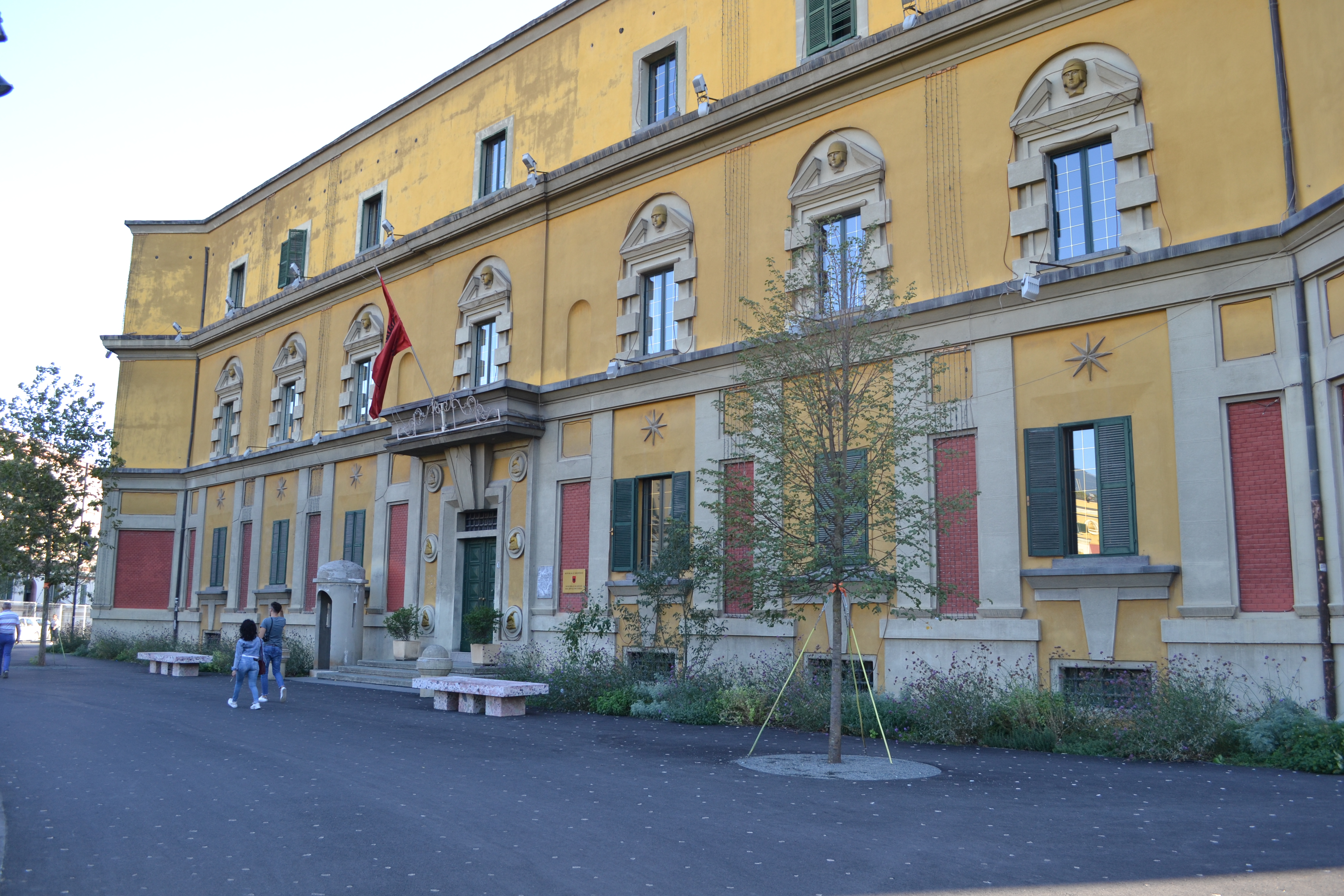

Department overview
- Formed: 4 December 1912; 113 years ago
- Jurisdiction: Government of Albania
- Headquarters: Skanderbeg Square 4, 1001 Tirana, Albania
- Minister responsible: Andis Salla
- Website: bujqesia.gov.al

The Ministry of Agriculture and Rural Development (Albanian: Ministria e Bujqësisë dhe Zhvillimit Rural) is a department of the Albanian Government in charge of regulation of the economic activity in the agricultural sector of the country with a purpose of increasing the sector's production capacity.

The ministry is responsible for agriculture, rural development, food safety and consumer protection, fisheries and aquaculture, and waters administration. It was formed as the Ministry of Agriculture within the special cabinet created on 4 December 1912, right after the Declaration of Independence, with the first minister Pandeli Cale.

== History ==
Since the establishment of the institution, the Ministry of Agriculture has been reorganized by joining other departments or merging with other ministries, thus making its name change several times.

- Ministry of Agriculture (1912–1914)
- Ministry of Public Works and Agriculture (1921–1925), (1927)
- Ministry of Agriculture (1927–1928)
- Ministry of Agriculture and Forestry (1928–1930)
- Minister State Secretary of Agriculture and Forestry (1943)
- Ministry of Agriculture (1945–1953)
- Ministry of Agriculture and Collections (1953–1954)
- Ministry of Agriculture (1954–1992)
- Ministry of Agriculture and Food (1992–1998)
- Ministry of Agriculture (1998–2001)
- Ministry of Agriculture and Food (2001–2005)
- Ministry of Agriculture, Food and Consumer Protection (2005–2013)
- Ministry of Agriculture, Rural Development and Water Administration (2013–2017)
- Ministry of Agriculture and Rural Development (2017–current)

== Subordinate institutions ==
- Agriculture Directorates (13)
- Directorate of Agricultural Production and Trade Policies
- Directorates of Irrigation and Drainage (4)
- Transfer Centers of Agriculture Technologies (QTTB)
- National Food Authority (AKU)
- Agency for Rural Agricultural Development (AZHBR)
- Institute of Veterinary and Food Safety (ISUV)
- Directorate of Fishery Service and Aquaculture
- National Tobacco Agency
- State Entity of Seeds and Saplings
- Institute of Technological Research
- State Water Inspectorate
- Agency for the Development of Mountainous Regions
- Regional Environmental Agencies
- Water Basin Agencies (6)

== Officeholders (1912–present) ==
No.	Name	Term in office
1	Pandeli Cale	4 December 1912	15 September 1913
2	Hasan Prishtina	15 September 1913	10 October 1913
3	Qemal Karaosmani	November 1913	22 January 1914
4	Aziz Vrioni	14 March 1914	20 May 1914
5	Abdi Toptani	28 May 1914	3 September 1914
*	Sami Vrioni (Note: Sami Vrioni served as delegate of public works, agriculture and trade.)	25 December 1918	29 January 1920
6	Spiro Jorgo Koleka	24 December 1921	30 May 1923
7	Sejfi Vllamasi	30 May 1923	25 February 1924
8	Kostaq Kotta	3 March 1924	27 May 1924
9	Qazim Koculi	16 June 1924	24 December 1924
–	Kostaq Kotta	1 February 1925	23 September 1925
10	Musa Juka	12 February 1927	20 October 1927
11	Ferid Vokopola	24 October 1927	20 June 1928
–	Musa Juka	20 June 1928	5 March 1930
12	Jakov Milaj	12 February 1943	28 April 1943
*	Nexhip Basha (Note: The title "Substitutive" (gheg albanian: Zavëndësisht), often using the acronym "Zav.", references to the temporary exercise of duty by an official who was not formally appointed by the prime minister but occupied the interim role of the vacant minister. These officials are labeled in the list with an asterisk.) (Note: Nexhip Basha served as deputy minister.)	11 May 1943	10 September 1943
13	Gaqo Tashko	4 July 1945	4 July 1950
14	Iliaz Reka	5 July 1950	5 September 1951
15	Hysni Kapo	6 September 1951	5 June 1955
16	Maqo Çomo	6 June 1955	1 December 1960
17	Peti Shamblli	1 December 1960	28 December 1965
18	Pirro Dodbiba	28 December 1965	25 April 1976
19	Themie Thomai	25 April 1976	1 February 1989
20	Pali Miska	2 February 1989	21 February 1991
21	Ahmet Osja	22 February 1991	10 May 1991
22	Nexhmedin Numani	11 May 1991	6 December 1991
23	Zyhdi Pepa	18 December 1991	13 April 1992
24	Rexhep Uka	13 April 1992	5 April 1993
25	Petrit Kalakulla	7 August 1993	23 August 1993
26	Hasan Halili	23 August 1993	10 July 1996
27	Bamir Topi	11 July 1996	1 March 1997
28	Haxhi Aliko	11 March 1997	24 July 1997
29	Lufter Xhuveli	25 July 1997	6 September 2001
30	Agron Duka	6 September 2001	10 September 2005
31	Jemin Gjana	10 September 2005	17 September 2009
32	Genc Ruli	17 September 2009	15 September 2013
33	Edmond Panariti	15 September 2013	13 September 2017
34	Niko Peleshi	13 September 2017	17 January 2019
35	Bledar Çuçi	17 January 2019	17 December 2020
36	Milva Ekonomi	18 December 2020	18 September 2021
37	Frida Krifca	18 September 2021	9 September 2023
38	Anila Denaj	12 September 2023	19 September 2025
39	Andis Salla	19 September 2025	" Incumbent "

== See also ==
- Agriculture in Albania
