= Minister of State for Relations with Parliament (Albania) =

Government ministry of Albania

Minister of State for Relations with the Parliament
- Ministër i Shtetit për Marrëdhëniet me Parlamentin

Ministerial post overview
- Formed: 15 September 2013
- Jurisdiction: Albania
- Headquarters: Tirana
- Minister responsible: Erjona Ismaili

The Minister of State for Relations with the Parliament (Albanian: Ministër i Shtetit për Marrëdhëniet me Parlamentin) is a ministerial post of the Albanian Government responsible for handling communications with the Parliament. The current minister is Erjona Ismaili.

== Officeholders (2013–present) ==
1. Ilirjan Celibashi (15 September 2013 – 14 August 2014)
2. Ermonela Felaj (27 August 2014 – 13 September 2017)
3. Elisa Spiropali (17 January 2019 – 29 July 2024)
4. Taulant Balla (30 July 2024 - 19 September 2025)
5. Toni Gogu (19 September 2025 - Present)

== See also ==
- Parliament of Albania
