= Metropolitan University of Tirana =

Private university in Tirana, Albania

Coordinates: 41.3202°N 19.8301°E

University Metropolitan Tirana
- Universiteti Metropolitan Tirana
- Type: Private
- Established: 2011
- Affiliations: University Iuav of Venice, Frederick University, University of Prizren, London Trade Association
- Rector: Prof. Dr. Nikolla Civici
- Location: Tirana, Albania
- Website: umt.edu.al

The University Metropolitan Tirana (Albanian: Universiteti Metropolitan i Tiranës), abbreviated UMT, is a private university located in Tirana, Albania. It was founded in 2011, by a group of architects and engineers as the only Albanian university on information technology, engineering and architecture.

== See also ==
- List of universities in Albania
- List of colleges and universities
- List of colleges and universities by country
