= Ministry of Tourism, Culture and Sport (Albania) =

Government ministry of Albania

Ministry of Tourism, Culture and Sports (MTKS)
- Ministria e Turizmit, Kulturës dhe Sportit

Department overview
- Formed: 3 December 1941; 84 years ago
- Preceding Department: Ministry of Economy, Culture and Innovation
- Jurisdiction: Council of Ministers
- Headquarters: Rruga Aleksandër Moisiu 36, Ish – Kinostudio “Shqipëria e Re”, 1005, Tirana
- Minister responsible: Blendi Gonxhja
- Website: https://mtks.gov.al/

The Ministry of Tourism, Culture and Sports (Albanian: Ministria e Turizmit, Kulturës dhe Sportit) is a department of the Albanian Government responsible for the implementation of affairs related to tourism, culture and sports. The current minister, Blendi Gonxhja, is serving since January 2024. (Note: Blendi Gonxhja was appointed as Minister of Economy, Culture and Innovation in January 2024 and served until September 2025. Following the formation of the Rama IV Cabinet, the Ministry of Tourism and Environment and the Ministry of Education, Sports and Youth were dissolved. Their tourism and sports portfolios were merged into the newly formed Ministry of Tourism, Sports and Culture, with Gonxhja appointed as its minister.)

== History ==
Since the establishment of the institution, the Ministry of Culture has been reorganized by joining other departments or merging with other ministries, thus making its name change several times. This list reflects the changes made in years in pluralist history since 1992 as an institution:

- Ministry of Culture, Youth and Sports (Ministria e Kulturës, Rinisë dhe Sporteve) from 1992 to 1996
- Ministry of Culture, Youth and Women (Ministria e Kulturës, Rinisë dhe Gruas) from 1996 to 1997
- Ministry of Culture, Youth and Sports (Ministria e Kulturës, Rinisë dhe Sporteve) from 1997 to 2005
- Ministry of Tourism, Culture, Youth and Sports (Ministria e Turizmit, Kulturës, Rinisë dhe Sporteve) from 2005 to 2013
- Ministry of Culture (Ministria e Kulturës) from 2013 - 2024.
- Ministry of Economy, Culture and Innovation from 2024 - 2025 .
- Ministry of Tourism, Culture and Sport from 2025 - current.

== Subordinate institutions ==
Arts and Culture

- National Theater of Opera, Ballet and National Ensemble
- National Theatre
- National Experimental Theatre "Kujtim Spahivogli"
- National Museum of Fine Arts
- National Library
- National Museum of Photography "Marubi"
- Center for Realization of Artworks
- National Centre of Cultural Property Inventory
- National Center of Folkloric Activities
- National Center of Culture for Children
- Central State Film Archive
- National Circus

Museums

- National Museum of History
- Museum of Secret Surveillance
- Skanderbeg Museum
- Ethnographic Museum of Kruja
- National Ethnographic Museum
- National Iconographic Museum Onufri of Berat
- National Museum of Medieval Art
- National Museum of Education
- National Archaeological Museum of Korçë
- Museum of Independence

Agencies, Institutions and Departments

- National Institute of Cultural Heritage
- Archeological Service Agency

== Officeholders (1941–present) ==
No.	Name	Term in office
1	Dhimitër Beratti	3 December 1941	4 January 1943
2	Mihal Sherko	18 January 1943	11 February 1943
3	Javer Hurshiti	12 February 1943	28 April 1943
4	Hilmi Leka	11 May 1943	10 September 1943
5	Kol Tromara	5 November 1943	16 June 1944
6	Mark Gjon Markaj	18 July 1944	28 July 1944
7	Akile Tasi	6 September 1944	25 October 1944
8	Sejfulla Malëshova	23 October 1944	21 March 1946
9	Bedri Spahiu	1 August 1953	21 June 1955
10	Ramiz Alia	21 June 1955	3 June 1958
11	Manush Myftiu	3 June 1958	22 June 1965
12	Fadil Paçrami	23 June 1965	13 September 1966
13	Thoma Deliana	14 September 1966	3 May 1976
14	Tefta Cami	3 May 1976	19 February 1987
15	Moikom Zeqo	11 May 1991	4 June 1991
16	Preç Zogaj	11 June 1991	6 December 1991
17	Vath Koreshi	18 December 1991	13 April 1992
18	Dhimitër Anagnosti	13 April 1992	3 December 1994
19	Teodor Laço	4 December 1994	10 March 1997
20	Engjëll Ndocaj	11 March 1997	24 July 1997
21	Arta Dade	25 July 1997	28 September 1998
22	Edi Rama	2 October 1998	26 October 2000
23	Esmeralda Uruçi	26 October 2000	6 September 2001
24	Luan Rama	6 September 2001	29 January 2002
25	Agron Tato	22 February 2002	25 July 2002
26	Blendi Klosi	29 December 2003	1 September 2005
27	Bujar Leskaj	9 September 2005	18 March 2007
28	Ylli Pango	19 March 2007	3 March 2009
29	Ardian Turku	17 March 2009	16 September 2009
30	Ferdinand Xhaferaj	16 September 2009	30 March 2011
31	Aldo Bumçi	19 July 2011	3 April 2013
32	Visar Zhiti	3 April 2013	11 September 2013
33	Mirela Kumbaro	15 September 2013	17 January 2019
34	Elva Margariti	17 January 2019	15 January 2024
34	Blendi Gonxhja	15 January 2024	Incumbent

== Notes ==
- The title "Substitutive" (gheg albanian: Zavëndësisht), often using the acronym "Zav.", references to the temporary exercise of duty by an official who was not formally appointed by the prime minister but occupied the interim role of the vacant minister. These officials are labeled in the list with an asterisk.

== See also ==
- Culture of Albania
- Ministry of Economy and Innovation
