= Elisa Spiropali =

Albanian politician (born 1983)

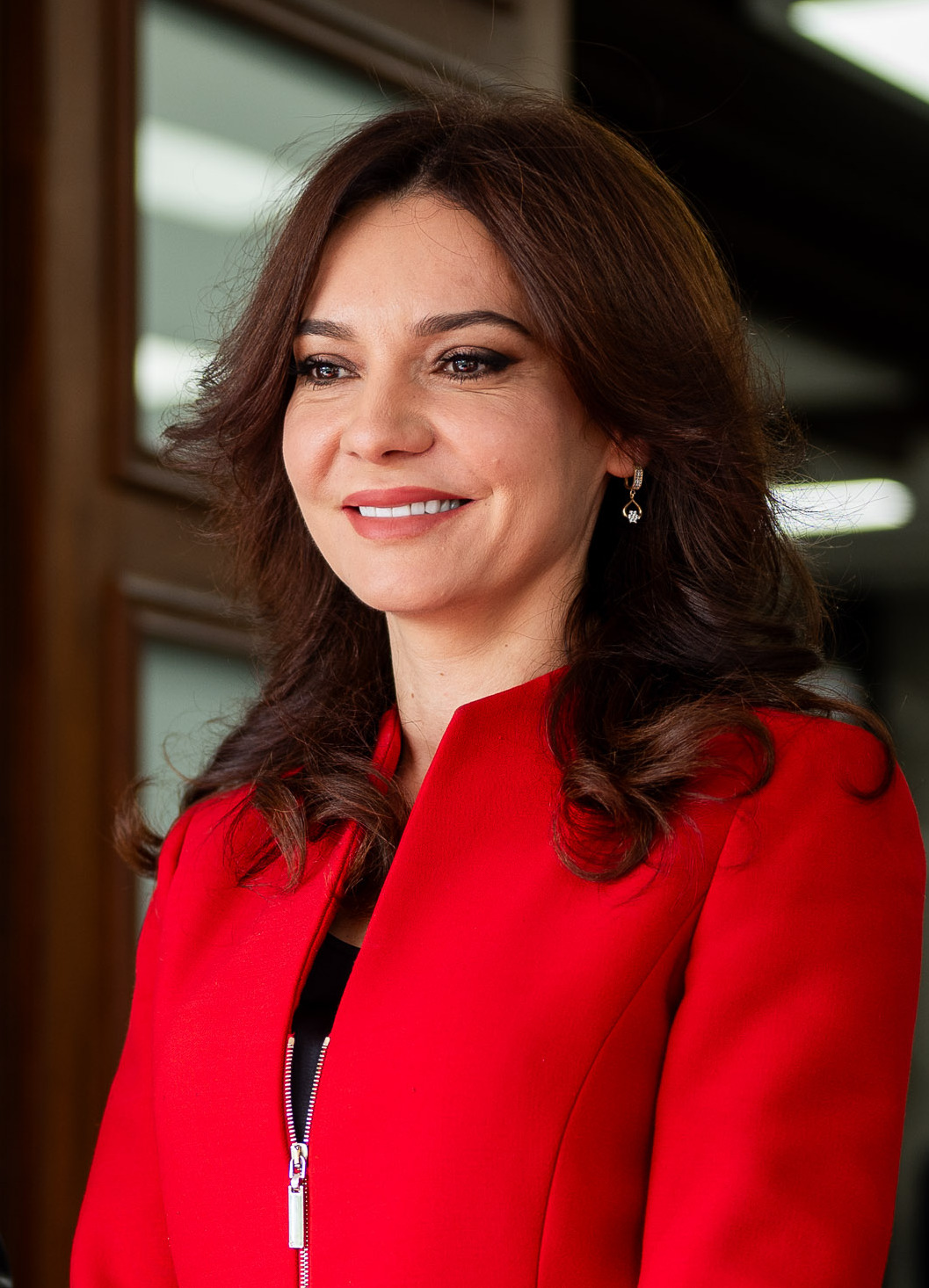
- Spiropali in 2025

Minister for Europe and Foreign Affairs
- In office 19 September 2025 – 26 February 2026
- President: Bajram Begaj
- Prime Minister: Edi Rama
- Preceded by: Igli Hasani
- Succeeded by: Ferit Hoxha

Speaker of the Parliament of Albania
- In office 30 July 2024 – 12 September 2025
- President: Bajram Begaj
- Prime Minister: Edi Rama
- Preceded by: Lindita Nikolla
- Succeeded by: Niko Peleshi

Minister of State for Relations with Parliament
- In office 17 January 2019 – 30 July 2024
- President: Ilir Meta; Bajram Begaj
- Prime Minister: Edi Rama
- Preceded by: Ermonela Felaj
- Succeeded by: Taulant Balla

Personal details
- Born: 15 March 1983 (age 43) Tirana, PSR Albania
- Party: Socialist
- Children: 2
- Education: Lester B. Pearson College, Mount Holyoke College

Elisa Spiropali (born 15 March 1983) is an Albanian former politician who served as the Speaker of the Parliament of Albania from July 2024 to September 2025 and from September 2025 until February 2026, she served as the Minister for Europe and Foreign Affairs of Albania.

== Early life ==
Elisa Spiropali was born on 15 March 1983 in Tirana. She attended the Qemal Stafa Gymnasium where she earned a scholarship from the United World Colleges to represent Albania, and attended the Lester B. Pearson United World College in Canada. She continued her education by enrolling at the Mount Holyoke College in Massachusetts, United States where she graduated in 2005 with an honorary degree in two branches, Politics and Economics. Elisa has travelled and studied merit scholarships to countries such as Argentina and the United Kingdom, experiences she considers invaluable in her academic formation.

She has given lectures in several private universities in Albania and has been a leader in youth organizations such as MJAFT!.

== Political career ==
Spiropali started her political career in 2009. After becoming a member of the Socialist Party, she was appointed for a brief time as Director General of Customs and later as a spokeswoman for the Party Presidency. She was elected as member of the Albanian Parliament following the 2013 General Elections. On 17 January 2019, she resumed the vacant post of Minister of State for Relations with the Parliament which had previously been held by Ermonela Felaj.

On 28 July 2024, Spiropali was appointed as Albania's deputy of parliament, following the resignation of Lindita Nikolla two days earlier.

On November 2026, she was permanently expelled from the Socialist Party and the Parliament of Albania, and she will no longer hold any position in politics.

== Personal life ==
Spiropali is married and has a young daughter, Nalta and a son.
