= Delina Ibrahimaj =

Albanian politician (born 1983)

Minister of Economy and Innovation
- Incumbent
- Assumed office 1 September 2023
- President: Bajram Begaj
- Prime Minister: Edi Rama

Minister of Finance and Economy
- In office 18 September 2021 – 9 September 2023
- President: Ilir Meta; Bajram Begaj
- Prime Minister: Edi Rama
- Preceded by: Anila Denaj
- Succeeded by: Blendi Gonxhja

Personal details
- Born: 23 December 1983 (age 42) Tirana, Albania
- Education: University of Rome Tor Vergata; Bocconi University
- Occupation: Politician

Delina Ibrahimaj (born 23 December 1983) is an Albanian politician serving as the Minister of Economy and Innovation of Albania since September 2023. She previously served as the Minister of Finance and Economy from September 2021 to September 2023.

== Early life ==
Delina Ibrahimaj was born on 23 December 1983 in Tirana, Albania. She studied in Italy at the University of Rome Tor Vergata and Luigi Bocconi University for Finance and Economic Management.

== Political career ==
From 2005 to 2007, she was manager of the Albanian Distribution Association. In 2007–2010, she performed the duty of general manager in Urban Distribution.

In 2011–2015, she worked as an economist at the Bank of Albania and served as Senior Financial Officer on the Board of Tirana Express. In 2016, she was member of the Statistics Council, INSTAT, and in 2017 was a member of the Board of Directors of FED invest and a member of Social Insurance Institute.

In 2019, Ibrahimaj served as Director General of Taxation. On 2 September 2021, she was appointed as Minister of Finance and Economy by the Prime Minister Edi Rama in new Cabinet Rama III after former Minister of Finance Anila Denaj was suspended.

== Other activities ==
- European Bank for Reconstruction and Development (EBRD), Ex-Officio Member of the Board of Governors (since 2021)
- World Bank, Ex-Officio Member of the Board of Governors (since 2021)
