= Bledar Çuçi =

Albanian politician (born 1970)

Minister of Internal Affairs
- In office 17 December 2020 – 8 July 2023
- President: Ilir Meta Bajram Begaj
- Prime Minister: Edi Rama
- Preceded by: Sandër Lleshaj
- Succeeded by: Taulant Balla

Minister of State for Local Governance
- In office 15 September 2013 – 19 March 2017
- Succeeded by: Eduard Shalsi

Personal details
- Born: 14 November 1970 (age 55) Tirana, Albania
- Party: Socialist
- Spouse: Delina Fico

Bledar "Bledi" Çuçi (born 14 November 1970) is an Albanian politician. From January 2019 until December 2020 he served as Minister of Agriculture and Rural Development in the second cabinet of Edi Rama. On 16 December 2020, he was chosen by Prime Minister Edi Rama to serve as Interior Minister following the resignation of Sandër Lleshaj after mass protests hit the country following the police shooting of a 25 year old man who broke quarantine curfew.

== Personal life ==
Cuci is married to Delina Fico, a civil society activist. In the late 90's, Fico was the fiancee of current Albanian Prime Minister Edi Rama, in whose cabinet Cuci serves.
