= Minister of State for Entrepreneurs (Albania) =

Government ministry of Albania

- Ministër i Shtetit për Mbrojtjen e Sipërmarrjes

Ministerial post overview
- Formed: 13 September 2017
- Jurisdiction: Council of Ministers
- Headquarters: Tirana, Albania
- Minister responsible: Edona Bilali
- Website: sipermarrja.gov.al

The office of the Minister of State for Entrepreneurs (Albanian: Ministër i Shtetit për Mbrojtjen e Sipërmarrjes) is a ministerial post of the Albanian Government responsible for communicating with entrepreneurs in the business community. The current minister is Edona Bilali.

== See also ==
- List of companies of Albania
