= Ministry of Infrastructure and Energy (Albania) =

Government ministry of Albania

- Ministria e Infrastrukturës dhe Energjisë

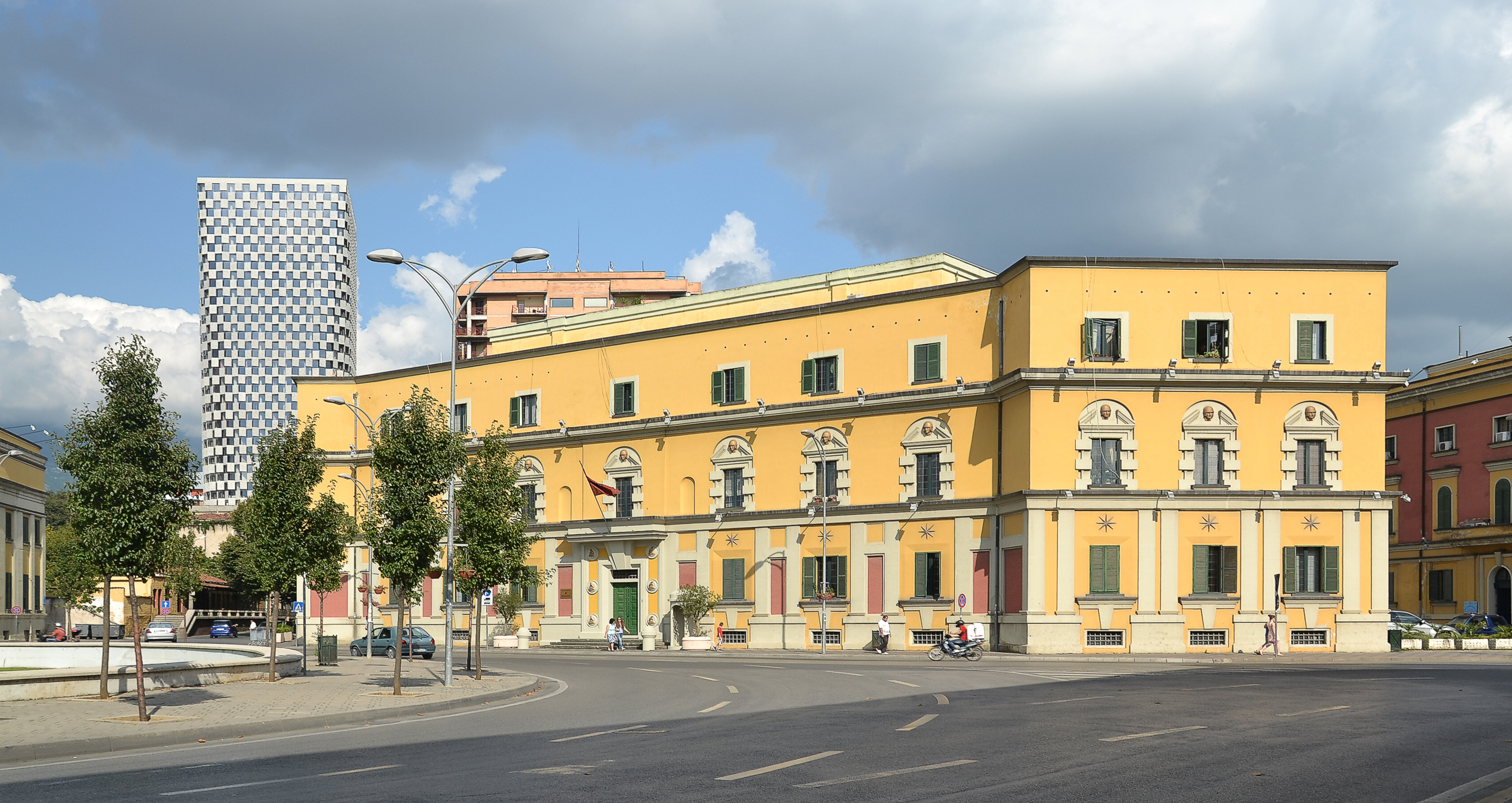

Department overview
- Jurisdiction: Government of Albania
- Headquarters: Skanderbeg Square 3, 1001 Tirana, Albania
- Minister responsible: Enea Karakaçi
- Website: infrastruktura.gov.al

The Ministry of Infrastructure and Energy (Albanian: Ministria e Infrastrukturës dhe Energjisë) is a department of the Albanian Government, responsible for national climate policy and international cooperation on climate change, as well as energy issues, meteorology and national geological surveys, electricity, water, wastewater services and industry in Albania.

== Subordinate institutions ==
- National Agency of Natural Resources
- Albanian Geological Survey
- Initiative for transparency in the extractive industry
- Technical and Industrial State Inspectorate
- National Nuclear Agency
- National Authority for Safety and Emergencies in Mines
- National Agency of Territorial Planning
- Central Technical Construction Archive
- Agency for Energy Efficiency
- Chemical Collection and Treatment Center
- Albanian Road Authority
- National Entity for the Investigation of Air Accidents/Incidents in Civil Aviation
- General Maritime Directorate
- Transport Institute
- General Directorate of Water Supply and Sewerage
- Directorate of Railway Inspection
- Civil Aviation Authority

== Officeholders (1981–present) ==
No.	Name	Term in office
Ministrat e Energjitikës (1981– )
1	Prokop Murra	27 March 1981	June 1982
2	Lavdosh Ahmetaj	23 November 1982	21 June 1989
3	Drini Mezini	11 May 1991	6 December 1991
4	Abdyl Xhaja	13 April 1992	1 March 1997
5	Kastriot Shtylla	11 March 1997	24 July 1997
6	Dritan Prifti	6 September 2001	29 January 2002
7	Viktor Doda	22 February 2022	10 September 2005
8	Genc Ruli	10 September 2005	8 September 2009
–	Dritan Prifti	9 September 2009	16 September 2010
9	Ilir Meta	16 September 2010	17 January 2011
10	Nasip Naço	17 January 2011	25 June 2012
11	Edmond Haxhinasto	3 July 2012	3 April 2013
12	Florjon Mima	4 April 2013	15 September 2013
13	Damian Gjiknuri	15 September 2013	17 January 2019
14	Belinda Balluku	17 January 2019	Incumbent
Ministrat e Infrastrukturës (2013– )
1	Edmond Haxhinasto	15 September 2013	9 September 2016
2	Sokol Dervishaj	9 September 2016	13 September 2017
3	Damian Gjiknuri	13 September 2017	17 January 2019
4	Belinda Balluku	17 January 2019	6 March 2026
5	Enea Karakaçi	6 March 2026	Incumbent

== See also ==
- Transport in Albania
- Renewable energy in Albania
- Council of Ministers (Albania)
