= Belinda Balluku =

Albanian politician (born 1973)

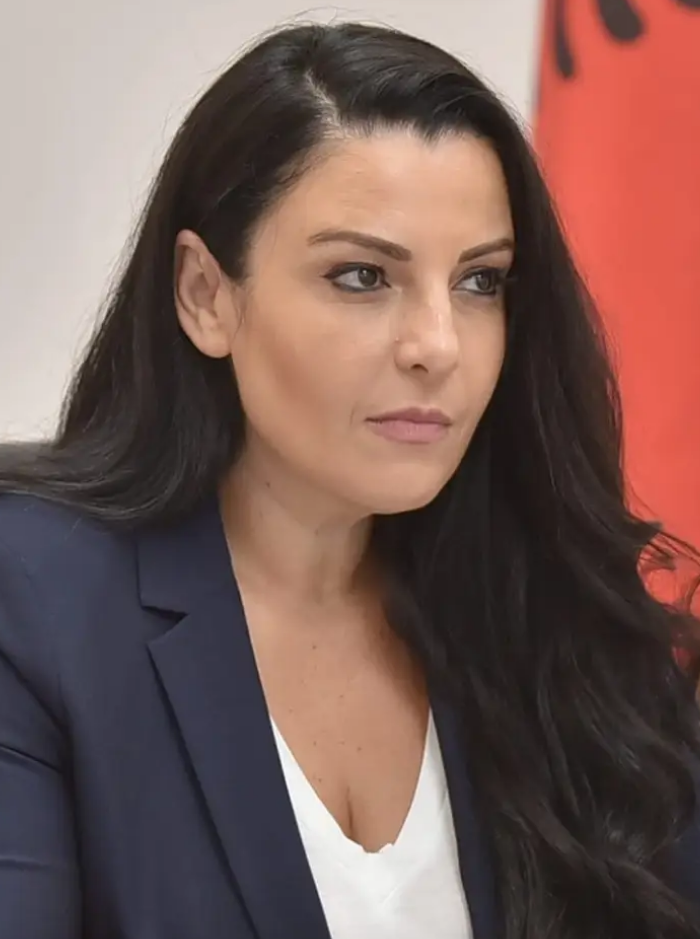
- Balluku in 2023

Deputy Prime Minister of Albania
- In office 28 July 2022 – 26 February 2026
- President: Ilir Meta; Bajram Begaj
- Prime Minister: Edi Rama
- Preceded by: Arben Ahmetaj
- Succeeded by: Albana Koçiu

Minister of Infrastructure and Energy
- In office 17 January 2019 – 26 February 2026
- President: Ilir Meta; Bajram Begaj
- Prime Minister: Edi Rama
- Preceded by: Damian Gjiknuri
- Succeeded by: Enea Karakaçi

Member of the 31st Parliament of Albania
- Incumbent
- Assumed office 10 September 2021
- Parliamentary group: PS
- Constituency: Tirana

Personal details
- Born: 9 October 1973 (age 53) Tirana, People's Socialist Republic of Albania
- Party: Socialist
- Spouse: Sokol Balla (m. 2004; div. 2015)
- Children: 2

Belinda Balluku (born 9 October 1973) is an Albanian politician who has served as Deputy Prime Minister of Albania from 2022 until 2026, as well as serving as Minister of Infrastructure and Energy of Albania from 2019 until 2026. She has also been a Member of the Parliament of Albania representing the District of Tirana since 2021.

On 20 November 2025, the Special Court Against Corruption and Organized Crime ordered the suspension from her governmental duties and a ban on leaving the country following her being formally charged by the Special Prosecution Office in connection with the Llogara Tunnel affair, including alleged violations of equality in public procurement related to the tunnel project and the fourth lot of Tirana’s Outer Ring Road.

== Early and personal life ==
Balluku was born on 9 October 1973 in Tirana. She stated in an interview that her family was persecuted during the Communist era of Albania and that her dad, Çlirim Balluku, worked in bitumen mines in Selenicë. Her grandfather was Beqir Balluku, an early member of the communist movement in Albania and the Minister of People's Defence, who was executed in November 1975 for organizing a coup against the government.

She graduated from the Athens Institute of Technology with degrees in law and business administration, and later on obtained an honorary master's degree in management from the International Air Transport Association's facilities in Miami. She was previously director of the companies of Albcontrol, the National Air Traffic Agency, and was a senior member of the state-owned mobile telephone company Telekom Albania as the Director of Customer Care and later of marketing. She is the ex-wife of journalist Sokol Balla. She has two children: Colin and Belen.

== Political career ==
In 2004, Mrs. Balluku joined the staff of the Municipality of Tirana, initially as a Public Relations Advisor and later as Director of the Mayor's Cabinet. During this period, she led the development of communication strategies with the public and the media. In 2006 she formally joined the Socialist Party of Albania. In 2019 she became Minister of Infrastructure and Energy in the cabinet of Edi Rama, and later in the 2021 Albanian parliamentary elections was elected to the Parliament of Albania for the District of Tirana. In 2022 she announced that the ministry would attempt to implement a plan where citizens received scheduled energy in the case of emergencies. She is the political leader of the Socialist Party in the Fier municipality.

== 2025 corruption investigation ==
In November 2025, Albania’s Special Anti-Corruption Structure (SPAK) announced criminal charges against Balluku and several officials from the Ministry of Infrastructure and Energy in connection with the public tender for the Llogara Tunnel. According to the prosecutors’ filing, Signal messages recovered from the phone of Evis Berberi, then director of the Albanian Road Authority, allegedly showed Balluku discussing tender deadlines and bidder details. SPAK accuses the group of “creating unjust advantages” for the Turkish consortium Intekar Yapi & ASL Insaat in violation of Albania’s procurement laws (Law 162/2020 and Decision 285/2021). Balluku has denied any wrongdoing.

On 20 November 2025, the Special Court Against Corruption and Organized Crime ordered two security measures against Deputy Prime Minister and Minister of Infrastructure and Energy Belinda Balluku: suspension from her governmental duties and a ban on leaving the country. Balluku had previously stated in parliament that she would not comment on ongoing investigations and had reaffirmed her support for the justice reform.

On February 26, Edi Rama, Prime Minister of Albania and leader of Socialist Party of Albania, dismissed Belinda Balluku from the government as the investigation intensified.

=== Parliamentary vote on immunity and arrest authorization ===
Earlier measures imposed by SPAK include suspension from public office and a ban on leaving Albania, with her passport blocked while the investigation proceeds. Despite these existing restrictions, SPAK requested a stricter preventive measure (arrest or house arrest), arguing that there was risk of interference with the investigation, including alleged intimidation of witnesses and potential manipulation or destruction of evidence. Because Balluku is a sitting member of parliament, SPAK needed the Assembly to lift her parliamentary immunity before any arrest measure could be executed.

On 12 March 2026, the Albanian parliament rejected SPAK’s request to lift Balluku’s immunity, meaning she remains under investigation with existing restrictions such as the travel ban but cannot currently be arrested.
