= Gallo-Roman site of Barzan =

Gallo-Roman archaeological site in Charente-Maritime, France

Barzan Gallo-Roman site
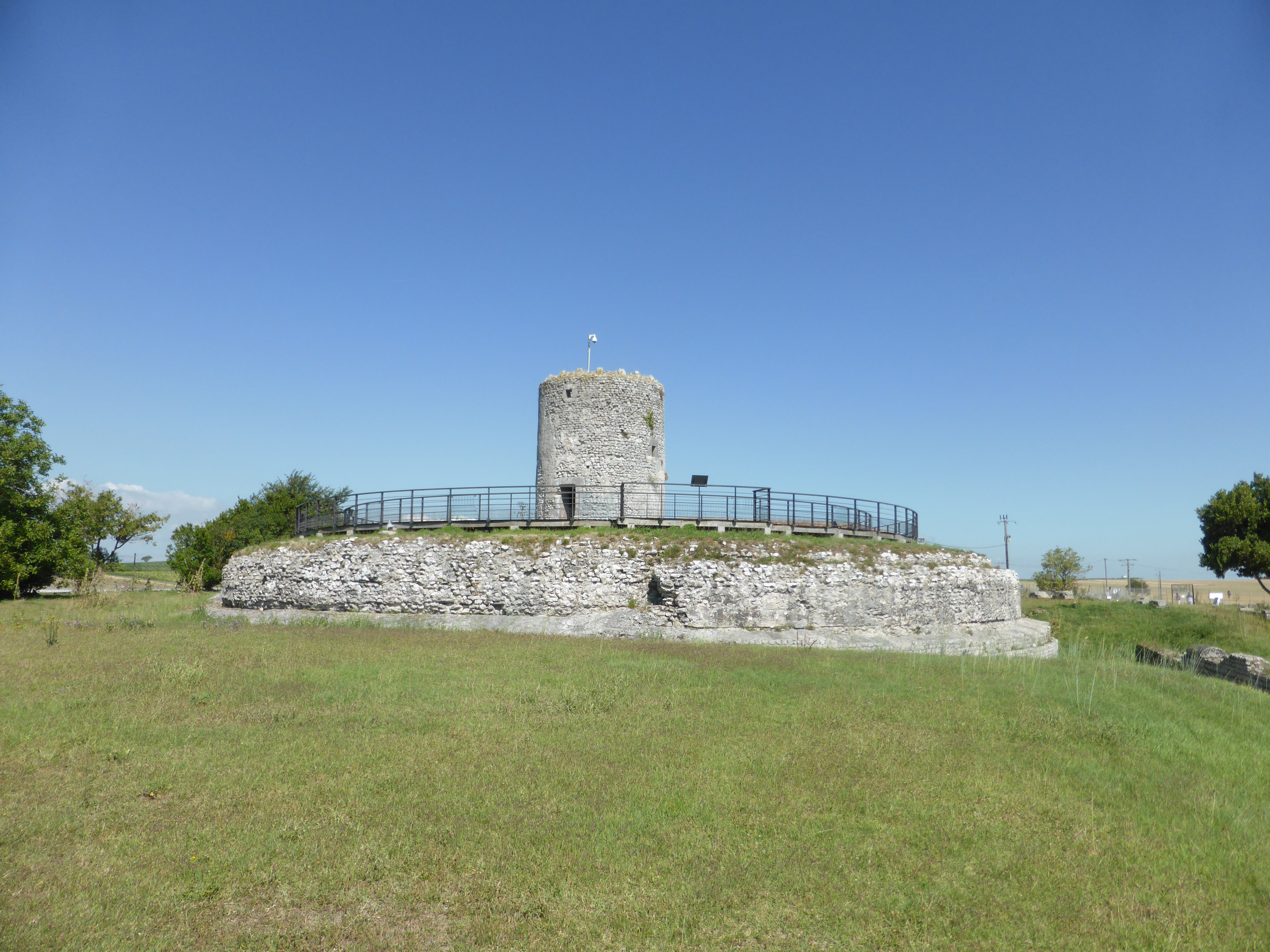
- Windmill built on the circular foundation of the temple.
- Interactive map of Barzan Gallo-Roman site
- 45.534323°N 0.878172°W
- Type: Gallo-Roman port city
- Periods: Early Roman Empire
- Location: Barzan, Charente-Maritime, France
- Region: Gallia Aquitania, Aquitania Secunda, Civitas Santonum

Site notes
- Website: https://www.fa-barzan.com/

The commune of Barzan, in the Charente-Maritime department of France, is home to a major Gallo-Roman archaeological site that has been the subject of scheduled archaeological excavations since 1994. Aerial photography and archaeological excavations have revealed the remains of a Gallo-Roman port city of great importance (featuring a monumental Gallo-Roman temple, thermal baths, a forum, a theater, and more) located between the communes of Barzan, Talmont-sur-Gironde, and Arces-sur-Gironde in the Charente-Maritime department

It is now considered highly likely that this Gallo-Roman town, which reached its peak during the 2nd century AD, is the Novioregum mentioned in the Antonine Itinerary. The town may also correspond to the Portus Santonum ("Port of the Santones") described by Ptolemy.

== History of the site ==
=== Prehistoric settlements ===
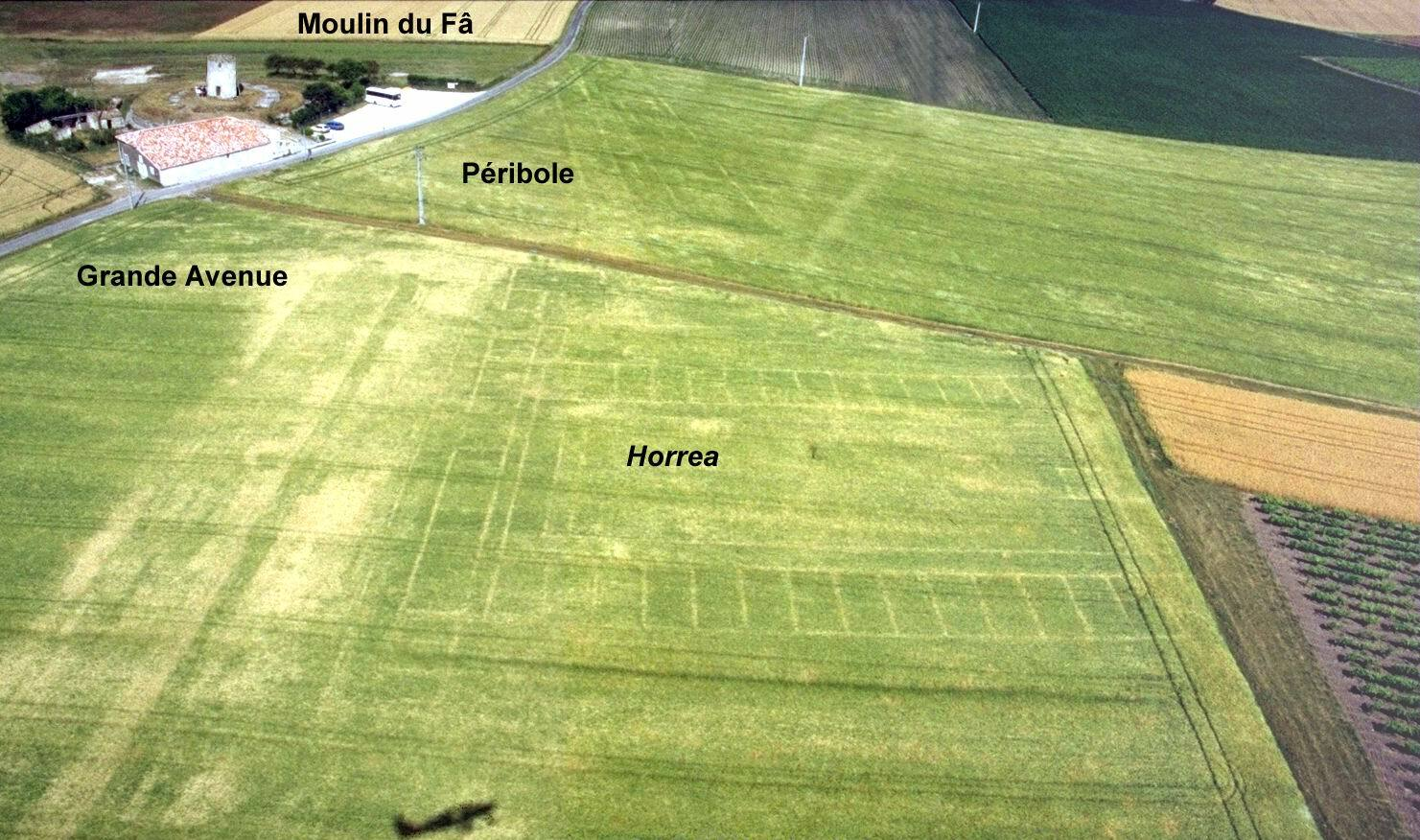
Aerial view of the Fâ site.

The surrounding area was occupied at a very early date, at least since the Neolithic, as demonstrated by the discovery of numerous archaeological remains at various locations in the commune of Barzan, particularly near La Garde Hill, a plateau overlooking the Gironde estuary. As early as 1877, the local historian Eutrope Jouan reported the discovery of fragments of polished stone axes and arrowheads. This discovery was supplemented almost a century later, in 1970, during land-levelling work following the dismantling of an American water reservoir built in 1917. These works uncovered pottery remains attributed to the Matignons cultural group and to the Peu-Richard culture. (Note: The Peu-Richard culture, dating to the 3rd millennium BC, is characterized by pottery decorated with horizontal fluting and eye-shaped motifs, as well as by fortified enclosures surrounded by double ditches. It takes its name from the hamlet of Peu-Richard at Thénac, a neighbouring commune of Barzan.) Layers of ash and hearth stones found nearby, together with the presence of a necropolis only a few metres from the site, established the existence of a settlement dating to around 3500 BC.

In 1975, an aerial archaeology survey conducted by Jacques Dassié confirmed these findings and also revealed the presence of fortifications surrounding the settlement. These consisted mainly of ditches and staggered entrances, an ingenious defensive system that left potential attackers highly exposed. Two more recent prehistoric sites dating to the Bronze Age were also discovered nearby: one close to the locality known as "Le Moulin du Fâ", and another on the northeastern slope of La Garde Hill, near the locality known as "Les Piloquets". The latter site was discovered by chance in 1980 during the planting of a vineyard. Among its finds were several bronze axes dating to around 1800 BC, which are now displayed at the Royan Museum.

=== A temple ===
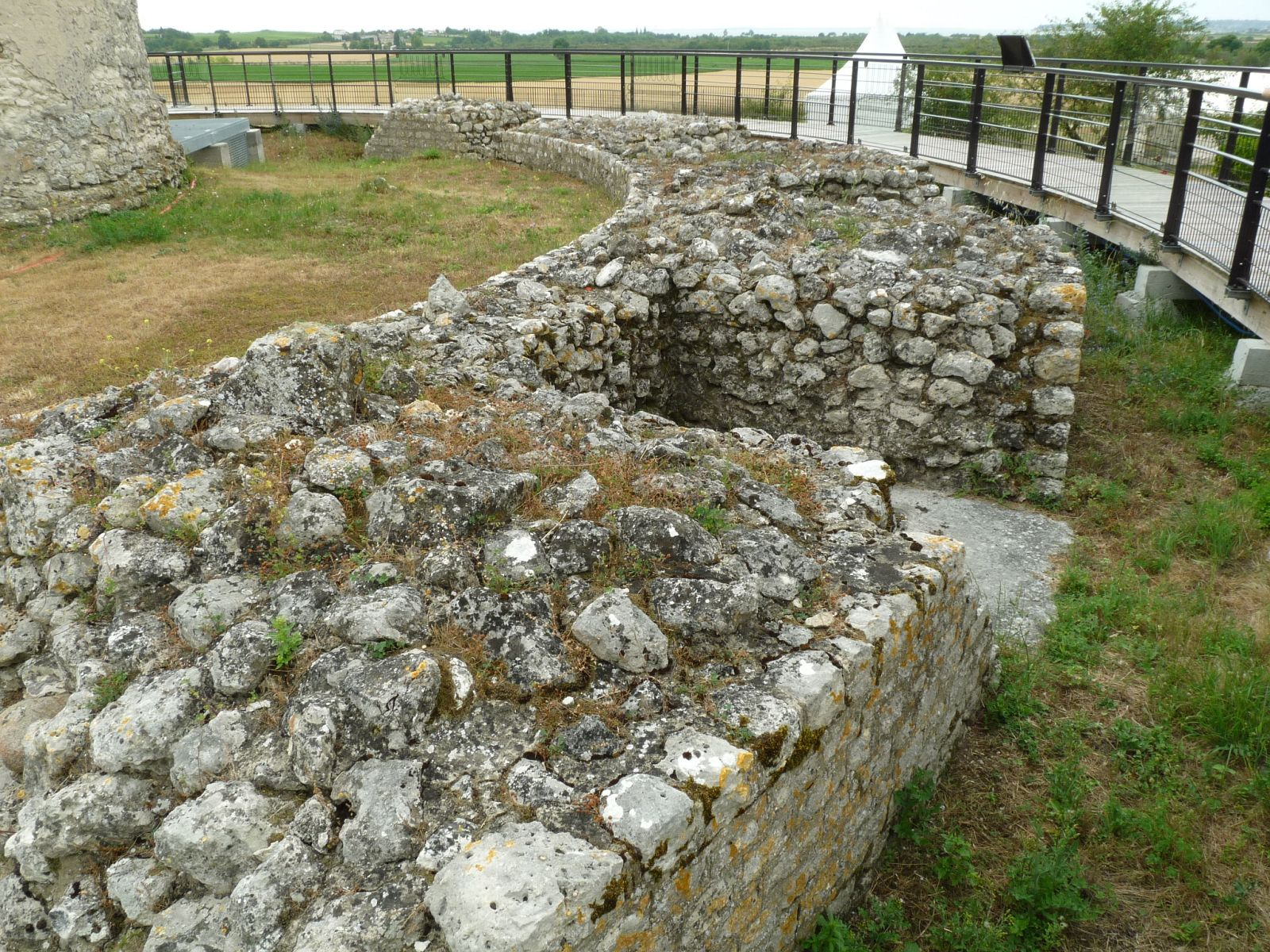
Remains of the cella of the principal temple at Le Fâ.

Around the 7th century BC, Saintonge was inhabited by the Celtic people known as the Santones. They established their capital at Saintes. The Santones also settled at the Le Fâ site, where they constructed a monumental sanctuary on a hill overlooking the Gironde estuary. They founded the settlement that would become the nucleus of the Roman city which developed there several centuries later. Recent aerial surveys have also revealed traces of two additional Celtic temples, located on La Garde Hill.

Excavations directed by Karine Robin between 1996 and 2002 uncovered Gallic and Celtiberian pottery dating to the 5th century BC, suggesting that a trading port already existed at that period. In 1997, excavations also yielded several examples of Gallic coinage, the earliest of which are believed to have been struck at the end of the 2nd century BC.

=== Roman period: emergence of a port city ===
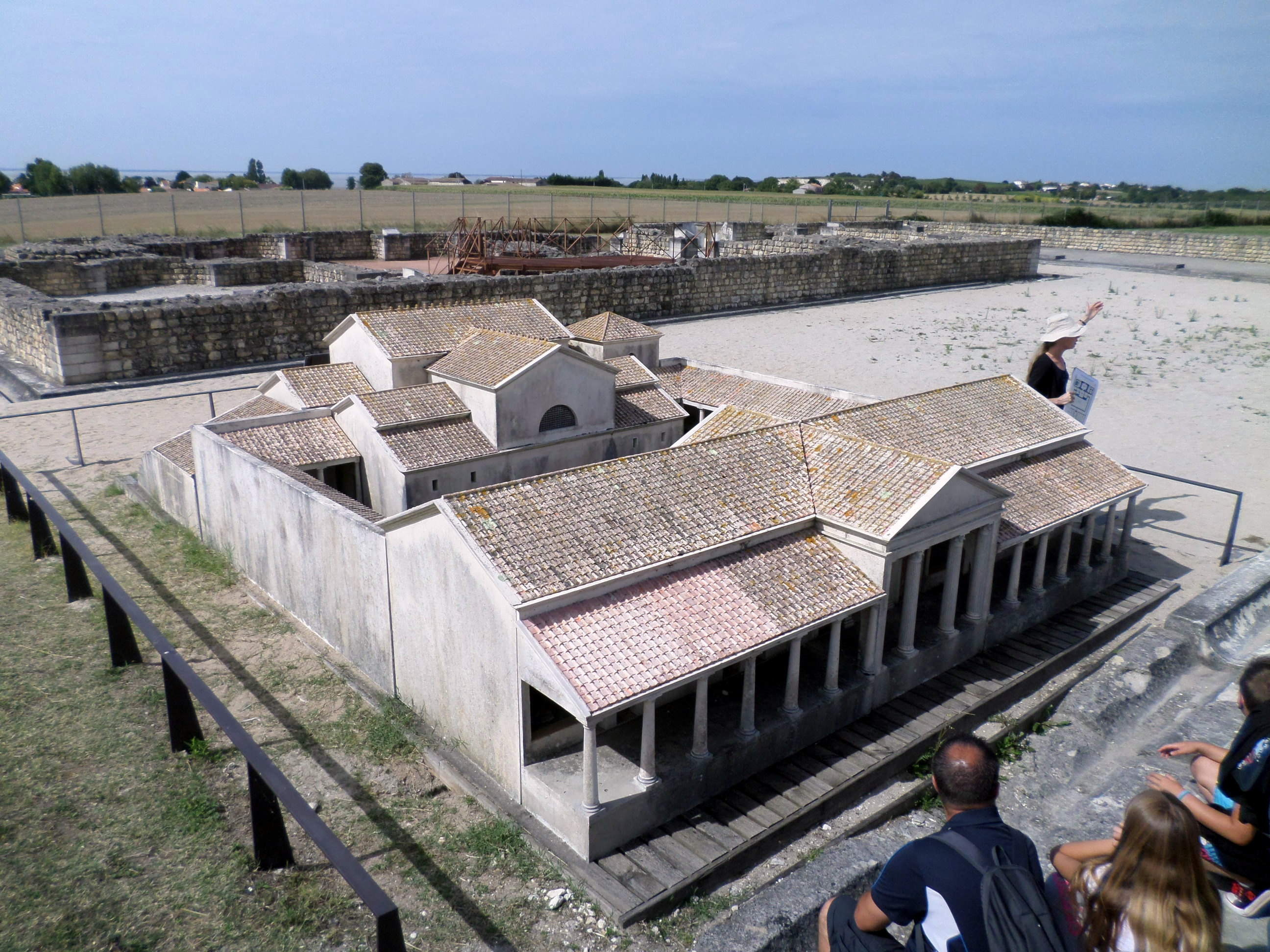
Scale model of the baths (1:10).

The territory of the Santones was conquered by the Romans in 58 BC. This marked the beginning of a period of prosperity for its capital, Mediolanum Santonum (modern Saintes), which became the first capital of the Roman province of Gallia Aquitania. The town of Novioregum, the second-largest settlement of the civitas Santonum (an administrative district of the Roman Empire), appears to have functioned as an emporium, or trading post, owing to its advantageous location near the mouth of the Gironde estuary. The first major public buildings were probably erected during the reign of the Flavian emperors (AD 69–96), as evidenced by fragments of statues and several Corinthian capitals dating from that period. The city appears to have reached its height during the 2nd century AD under the Antonine emperors. It was embellished with major public monuments, including a theatre, broad streets, a harbour, and warehouses (horrea). The Roman baths were also enlarged during this period.

The prosperous city is mentioned in the Antonine Itinerary, compiled during the reign of the Roman emperor Diocletian in the 3rd century AD. It places Novioregum on the road linking Saintes with Bordeaux via Blaye, at a distance of 15 leagues from Saintes (approximately 35 kilometres) and 12 leagues from Tamnum, a settlement that Jacques Dassié identified with a site near Consac (approximately 29 kilometres away). Dassié bases his hypothesis on the possible use of a long Gallic league—measuring 2,450 meters—instead of the Roman mile.

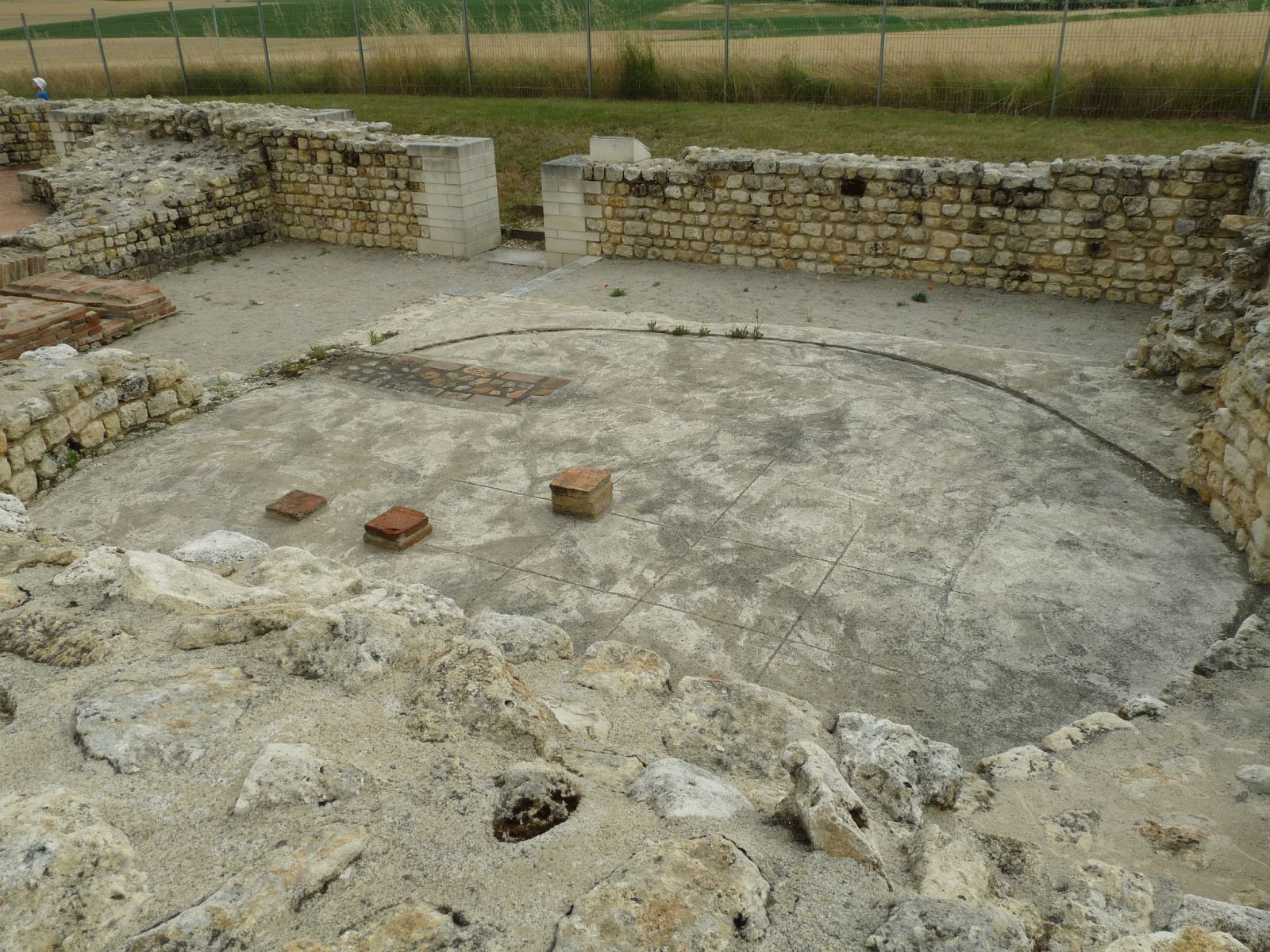
Remains of the sudatorium, one of the bath rooms comparable to a modern sauna.

== Decline of the ancient city ==
=== Decline, abandonment and oblivion ===
The city retained a certain importance until the end of the 3rd century, after which it declined for reasons that remain unknown. One hypothesis is that the harbour—probably the economic lifeblood of the settlement—gradually silted up, although no conclusive evidence has yet been found. This phenomenon was common in the region and, in the 17th century, led to the decline of another major regional port, Brouage.

At the beginning of the Middle Ages, the ancient Roman city became a quarry for building stone. Decorative architectural elements were reused in local houses and churches, while Roman column shafts served for many years as well-heads in nearby villages. One such column, dating from the 3rd century, was reused as a baptismal font in the church of Épargnes, a neighbouring village. During the 16th century, a windmill was erected on the podium of the former temple. Known as the Moulin du Fâ, its name is probably a corruption of the Latin term fanum.

=== Unexpected occupation during the medieval period ===
Research conducted between 2015 and 2017 revealed evidence of Late Antiquity and early medieval occupation at the site. Archaeologists identified settlement remains from the Merovingian and Carolingian periods, including sunken-featured buildings, modified structures, silos, wells, and burials, both within the heart of the ancient town and in its surrounding area.

== Rediscovery ==
=== Ruins that aroused curiosity ===
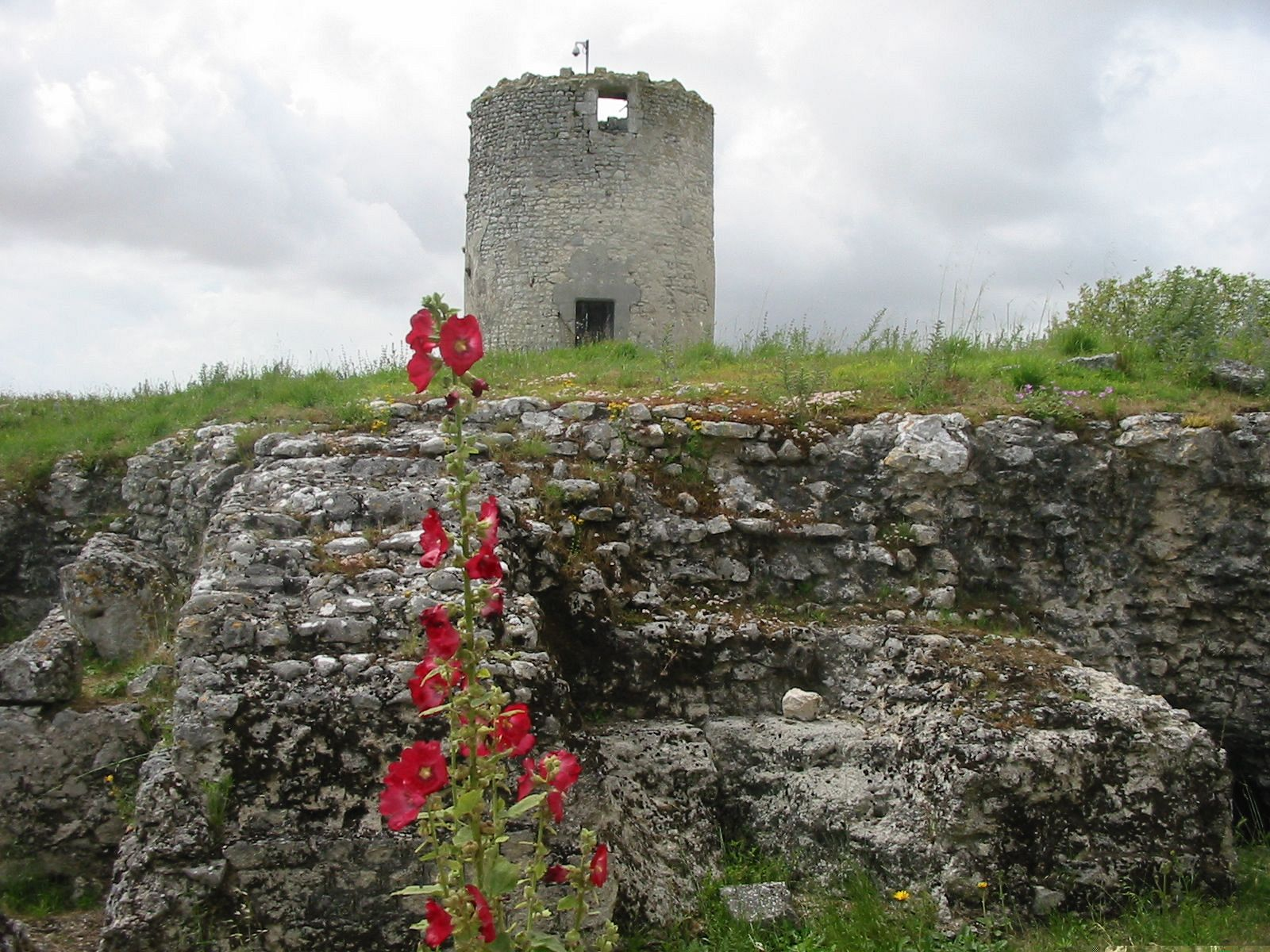
The ruins of this windmill stand on the podium of a former Roman temple (its foundations are visible in the foreground).

Although the presence of ancient ruins at Barzan had been known for several centuries—the royal engineer Claude Masse recorded them while serving in Aunis and Saintonge between 1694 and 1715—their significance was long underestimated. The first scholar to appreciate their importance was Abbé Auguste Lacurie, secretary of the Société archéologique de Saintes in the late 19th century. In 1844, he proposed that the visible ruins at Barzan might be those of the ancient town of Novioregum, whose location had been sought for centuries. However, several prominent archaeologists, such as Léon Massiou - a historian from Saujon who was considered an authority at the time- dispute this hypothesis, particularly in a book published in 1924.

Massiou himself directed an archaeological excavation at the site known as the Moulin du Fâ between 1921 and 1924. In addition to the temple and theatre already described by Claude Masse, the excavations uncovered the remains of an aqueduct and later those of Roman baths, confirming the existence of a settlement of considerable importance at the site.

The importance of these discoveries led to the site's designation as a French Monument historique in 1937 and 1939.

=== Novioregum ===
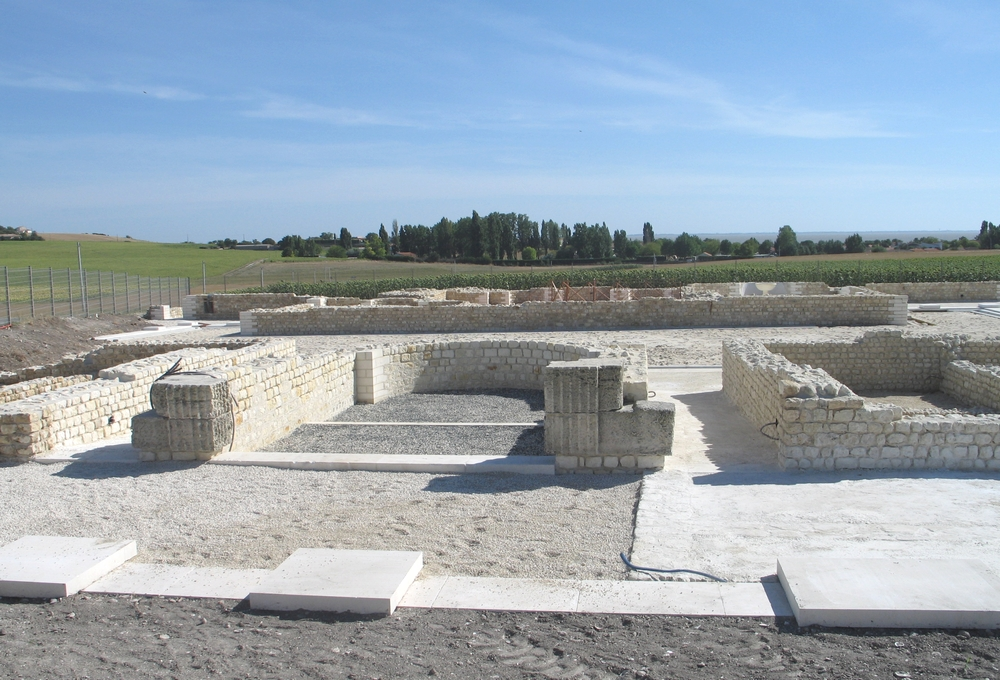
The Roman baths at the Barzan Gallo-Roman site.

Between 1935 and 1957, Louis Basalo, an architect and archaeologist from Royan, also conducted excavations, investigating the aqueduct and excavating the Roman baths. During this campaign, a votive stele was discovered about 20 metres from the main sanctuary. Its inscription (C[aius] Cæcilius galeria civilis mart[i]) is generally interpreted as a dedication to the god Mars.

Despite these important discoveries, it was not until 1975, during a period of severe drought, that Jacques Dassié carried out aerial surveys which transformed understanding of the archaeological site. (Note: Jacques Dassié wrote: "Our first aerial survey photographs date from 1962. They revealed nothing decisive or interpretable as Gallo-Roman beyond the visible structures. It was not until the end of June 1975, when favourable crop conditions coincided with exceptional weather, that spectacular results were obtained. At the beginning of the summer, the yellowing cereals clearly revealed all the major features of a city.") The surveys showed that the site was far larger than previously suspected. Hidden beneath farmland and vegetation lay an ancient city covering approximately 140 hectares, comparable in size to the major Roman cities of Saintes (130 ha), Poitiers (about 150 ha), and Bordeaux (150–170 ha). The surveys identified temples, baths, a theatre, warehouses, a forum, residential districts, and an organized street network.

The site, initially consisting of privately owned land, was purchased by the municipality of Barzan in 1993, the same year that the association ASSA Barzan was established to manage and promote it. Systematic excavations began in 1994 under the supervision of Université Bordeaux III and the University of La Rochelle.

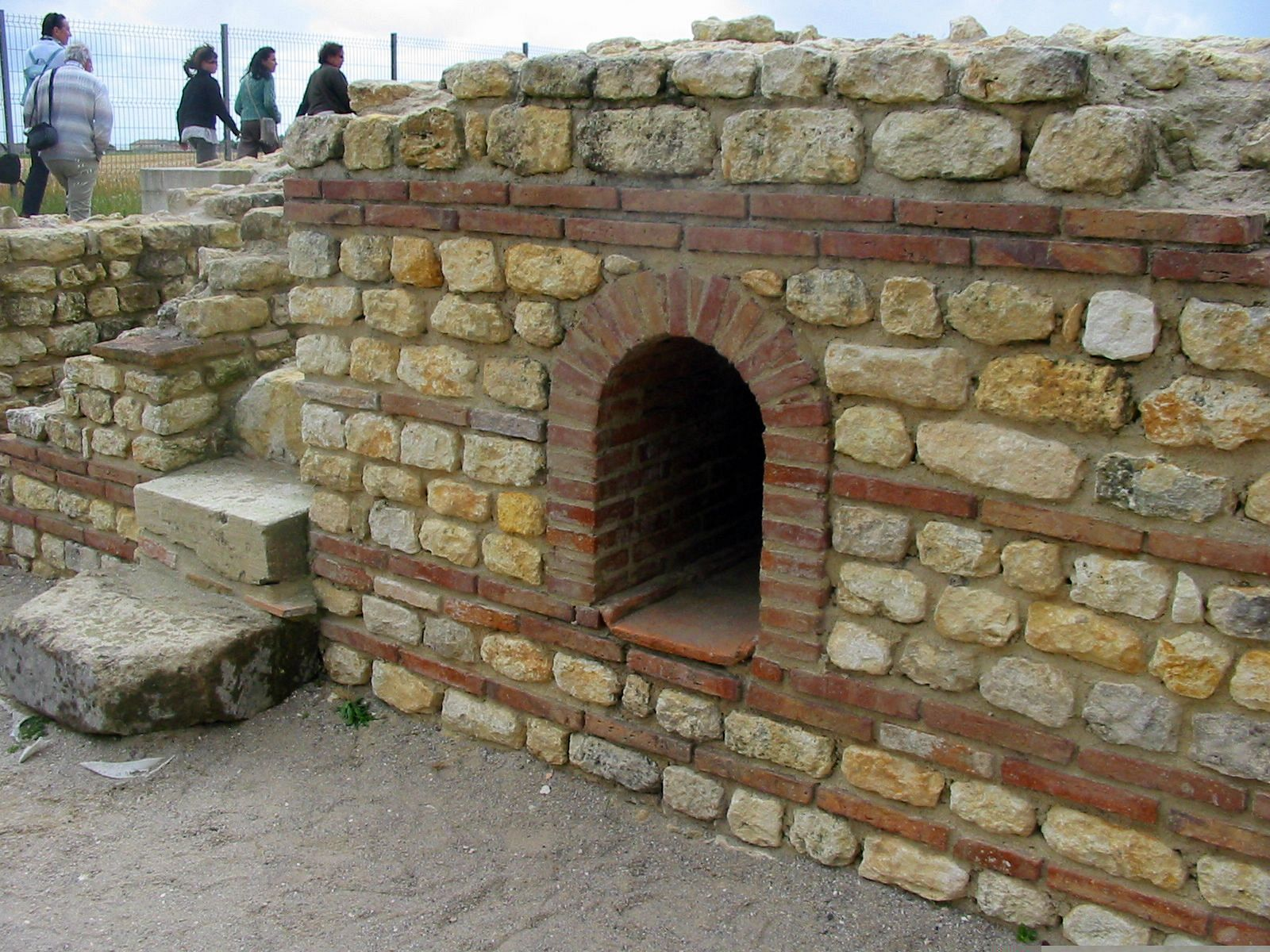
Remains of the baths: furnace supplying the caldarium, or hot room.

In 1994, the French Ministry of Culture entrusted excavations of the Sanctuary of Le Fâ to Pierre Aupert, research director at the CNRS. These excavations revealed, among other discoveries, the construction of two successive temples, the existence of a large pit (possibly used for sacrificial purposes), and construction markers associated with the temple podium.

In 1999, Laurence Tranoy carried out successful trial excavations at the locality known as Le Trésor, on the presumed site of the forum at the intersection of the cardo maximus and the decumanus.

From 1998 to 2004, excavations of the Roman baths north of Le Fâ were directed by Alain Bouet, maître de conférences HDR at the University of Bordeaux and a specialist in the Gallo-Roman period. These excavations soon demonstrated that the complex is one of the largest Roman bath establishments known in Gaul. Between 2002 and 2009, Bouet also directed excavations of the storage warehouses (horrea) south of the sanctuary, revealing extensive storage buildings and confirming the importance of the ancient harbour.

Excavations of the Sanctuary of Le Fâ carried out between 2006 and 2008 also uncovered the walls of the peribolos, revealing two successive enclosure walls, the second of which was monumental and measured approximately 106 metres (348 ft) by 92 metres (302 ft).

Excavations of the theatre at the site of La Garde resumed in 2007 under the direction of Graziella Tendron and Antoine Nadeau (EVEHA) and continued until 2017. They uncovered an imposing structure measuring 81 metres in diameter that could accommodate approximately 5,000 spectators. After excavation, the theatre was reburied to ensure the long-term preservation of its remains.

== Site description ==
=== Identified monuments ===
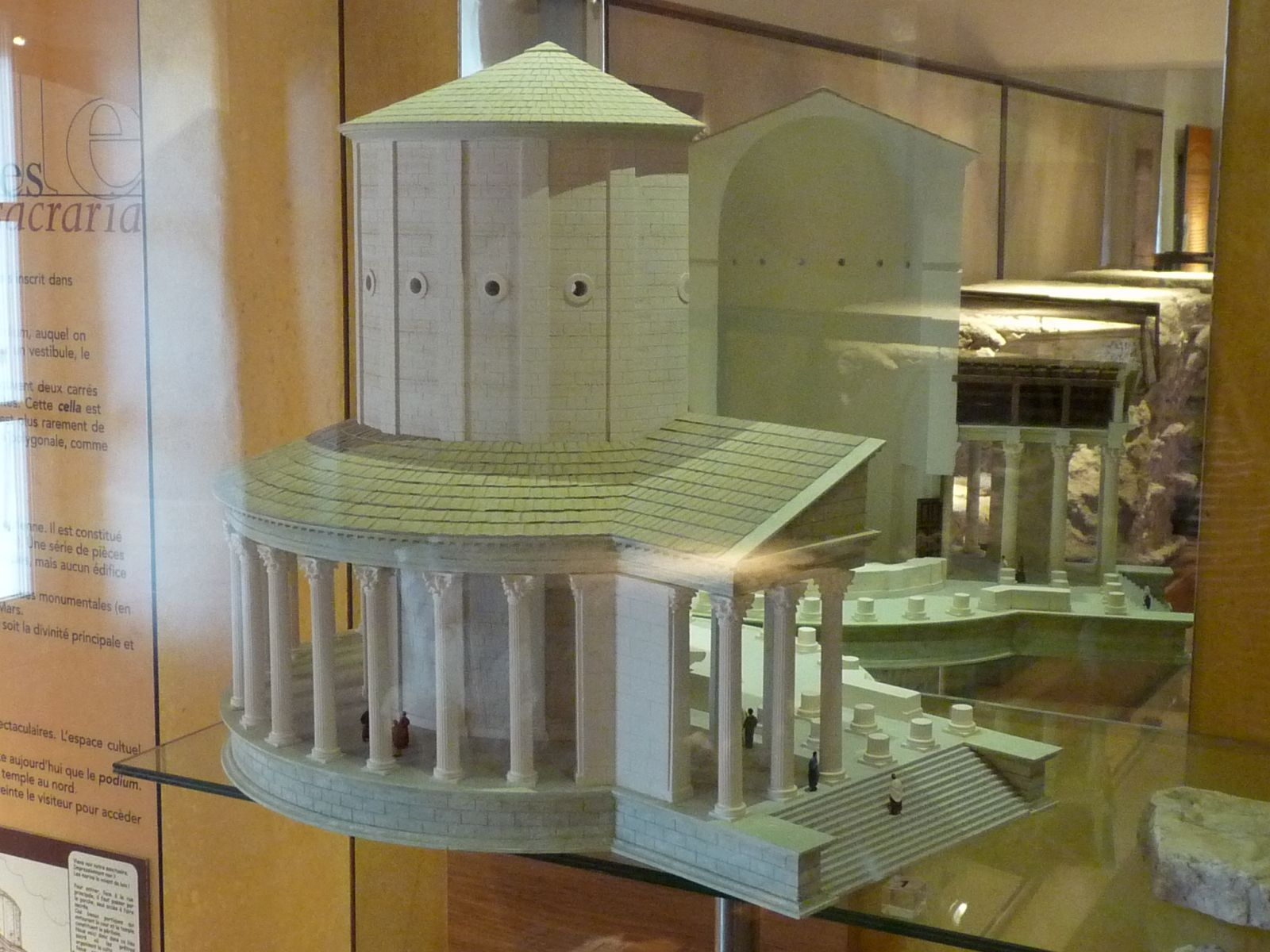
Scale model reconstructing the Temple of Le Fâ as it may have appeared in the 2nd century AD.

- The monumental Temple of Le Fâ

At the centre of a rectangular peribolos measuring 106 metres (348 ft) by 92 metres (302 ft), the 2nd-century Gallo-Roman temple consisted of a circular colonnade (estimated total height: 16 metres (52 ft)), a circular cella at its centre (20.80 metres (68.2 ft) in diameter and an estimated 35 metres (115 ft) high), and an entrance porch 7.7 metres (25 ft) deep with a colonnaded façade. This monumental circular Gallo-Roman temple likely resembled those at Vesunna in Périgueux and at the vicus of Tours Mirandes in Vendeuvre-du-Poitou.

- The Eastern temples

At the eastern end of the decumanus are the remains of several temples discovered during the 1975–1976 drought. Originally, the complex consisted of a fanum with a square cella surrounded by a peribolos, a temple of Celtic tradition with a hexagonal cella, and a classical Roman temple with a rectangular masonry podium and no surrounding peribolos.

- The Roman baths

Excavation of the northern part of the Roman baths is considered complete. Archaeological investigations demonstrated that the baths were supplied with water from a large rectangular well measuring 3 metres (9.8 ft) by 4.4 metres (14 ft) and 16 metres (52 ft) deep. The well was equipped with a water-lifting mechanism whose collapsed wooden machinery is still under study.

- The La Garde theatre

East of the Le Fâ site, probably at the outer edge of the ancient town, the Roman theatre occupies the slope of La Garde Hill. The radius of the semicircular auditorium is at least 50 metres (160 ft), and its cavea was supported by radial walls with stone seating. According to ASSA Barzan, it is a major monument, possibly larger than the Roman theatres of Arles and Vaison-la-Romaine, and comparable to the largest theatres known in Roman Gaul, including those at Vienne, Orange, and Autun.

- The horrea (warehouses)

East of Le Fâ, aerial archaeology has identified extensive public warehouses characteristic of port cities, comparable to those found at Vienne, Lyon, Rouen, Bordeaux, Cologne, Hyères, and Corseul. Excavations have uncovered several storage units.

- The Chauvignac Spring aqueduct

The aqueduct is located 3 kilometres (1.9 mi) east of the site, in the commune of Chenac-Saint-Seurin-d'Uzet. Explored over a distance of about 100 metres in 1939, its elevation is nevertheless lower than that of both the baths and the temple, raising questions about how the ancient city was supplied with water.

=== Urban layout ===
- The decumanus

The decumanus is visible on all aerial photographs and, in some places, can still be traced on the ground. Around 10 metres (33 ft) wide, it is a monument in its own right. Its visible length is approximately 400 metres (1,300 ft), and it forms the principal axis of the city's street plan, apparently serving an important ceremonial as well as practical function. During the 1st century AD, a road was laid out leading to the entrance of the Gallo-Roman sanctuary. In the 2nd century, the site expanded and was embellished: the circular temple was rebuilt and enlarged, as were the Roman baths and the horrea.
Current excavations, directed by Laurence Tranoy (University of La Rochelle) and Emmanuel Moizan (INRAP), aim to reconstruct the circulation pattern of the ancient city and, in particular, to determine the nature and function of this unusually wide and long street, nicknamed the "Grand Avenue". In a documentary devoted to one of these excavation campaigns (2008), Laurence Tranoy explains that the "Grand Avenue" is an archaeological feature resulting from successive changes in the city's urban planning and from the increasing importance of its religious function.

- The forum

The remains of the Roman forum have been identified near the locality known as Le Trésor, between the ancient harbour and the Sanctuary of Le Fâ, along the former cardo maximus. Trial excavations carried out in 2015 confirmed the aerial photographic evidence. One of these excavations uncovered a small statue of Cupid, which is now displayed in the site's museum.

- The harbour

The site of the ancient harbour, located near the locality known as La Combe du Rit, has not yet been excavated. Identified through aerial photography and by flooding in 1999, it lay south of the Gallo-Roman town, close to the forum. It served as a landing place for seagoing vessels. The extensive warehouses together with Greek pottery dating from the 5th century BC and Hispanic ceramics recovered from the site suggest that the harbour may have been an important trading centre on one of the tin trade routes linking the British Isles with the Mediterranean Sea.

=== Museum ===
A new museum opened in December 2005 in the former Le Fâ farm buildings. It displays archaeological finds from the most recent excavation campaigns, interpretive reconstructions, a 1:10 scale model of the Gallo-Roman city, and an interactive terminal offering a virtual tour of the ancient settlement.

== Other examples of fana in France ==
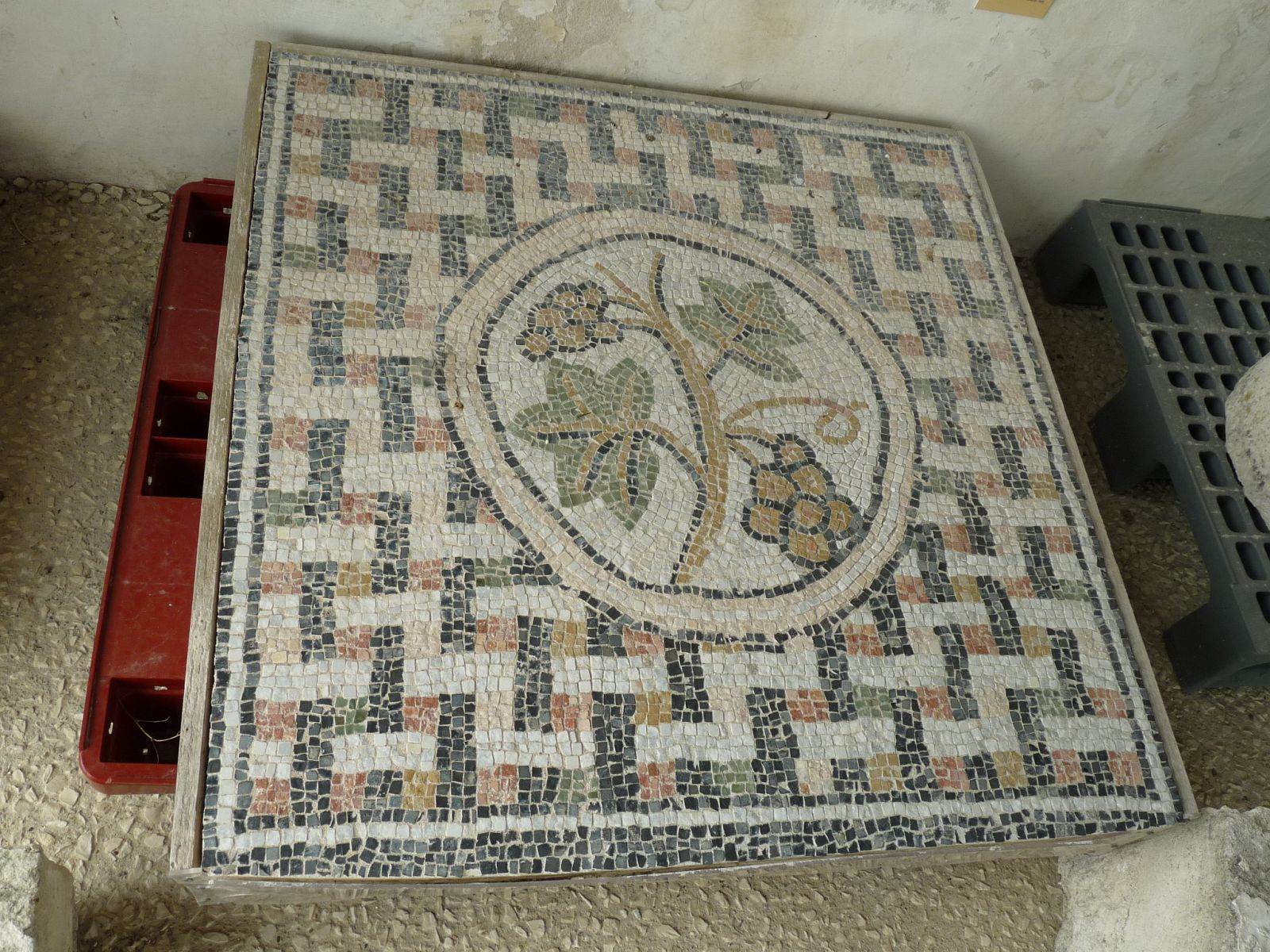
Reproduction of a mosaic from the Villa of Séviac (Gers), created for an educational demonstration.

According to Isabelle Fauduet, the Gallo-Roman rural temple (fanum) differed from the rectangular Roman temple typical of urban areas, which derived from Greek architectural traditions. A fanum generally consisted of a tall cella, most often square or circular, surrounded by a lower gallery for the circulation of worshippers, all enclosed within a sacred precinct defined by a surrounding wall (a peribolos). Nearly 600 Gallo-Roman temples have been identified throughout the territory of Roman Gaul.

Monumental Gallo-Roman temples often succeeded earlier Celtic sanctuaries. Some were themselves later reused as the foundations of churches or cathedrals. Near the Le Fâ site, this is notably the case for the church at Thaims and the church at Vaux-sur-Mer.

Some other monumental temple sites in France include (this list is not exhaustive):

- Périgueux – Vesunna; Tower of Vésone: circular cella;
- Vendeuvre-du-Poitou – Vindobriga; vicus of Tours Mirandes: circular cella;
- Autun – Augustodunum; Temple of Janus: square cella;
- Aurillac – Aureliacum; Fanum of Aron: polygonal cella;
- Naves – Navea; Tintignac archaeological site;
- Corseul – Fanum Martis: polygonal cella;
- Chassenon – Cassinomagus: polygonal cella;
- Champlieu – Campilocus?; square cella;
- Tours: circular cella.

Other large Gallo-Roman temples have been identified in France at Donon, Nasium, Bennecourt, the Temple of the Halatte Forest, and Aubigné-Racan, as well as elsewhere in the Benelux and Switzerland.

== Roman roads around Novioregum ==
The Antonine Itinerary, in its route from Bordeaux to Autun (Itinerarium Antonini – Item a Burdigala Augustodunum mpm CCLXXIIII sic Blauto mpm XVIIII Tamnum mpm XVI Novioregum mpm XII Mediolanum Santonum mpm XV Aunedonnacum mpm XVI ...), places Blaye 18 miles from Bordeaux, Tamnum 16 miles from Blaye, Novioregum 12 miles from Tamnum, and Saintes 15 miles from Novioregum. According to Jacques Dassié, the unit of measurement used was not the standard Roman mile (approximately 1,482 metres) but the longer Gallic league, measuring approximately 2,450 metres.

The Tabula Peutingeriana does not mention Novioregum between Lamnu (sic) and Mediolano Santo (sic), probably because the site had already been abandoned by the time the map was compiled or revised.

Historical sources mention no Gallo-Roman coastal settlement between the Portus Santonum of the Santones and the Portus Namnetum of the Pictones, that is, between Saintes/Novioregum on the Gironde estuary and Rezé (near Nantes) on the Loire. The Roman road from Bordeaux to Nantes leaves the coastline eastward near Saintes/Novioregum, making a considerable detour through Poitiers before turning west towards Parthenay, Bressuire, Mortagne-sur-Sèvre, and Clisson.

This apparent anomaly is explained by major changes to the Atlantic coastline since the Roman period. At the beginning of the Common Era, the coasts of Saintonge and Poitou were deeply indented by several marine gulfs:

- The Gulf of Seudre covered part of what is now the oyster farming basin around the Seudre estuary, making settlements such as Saujon and L'Éguille seaports. It was separated from the Gulf of Saintonge by a narrow peninsula known as the Pagus maritimensis ("country of the sea"), which later gave its name to the town of Marennes.
- The Gulf of Saintonge extended from Marennes to south of Rochefort. It gradually silted up through alluvial deposits. As late as the 16th century, the Atlantic still reached the Brouage fortifications, although the former military harbour now lies about 15 kilometres (9.3 mi) inland.
- The Gulf of the Pictones (Sinus Pictonum), also known as the Lacus Duorum Corvorum ("Lake of the Two Ravens"), north of the Île de Ré, eventually became the Marais Poitevin, formed from the estuary of the Sèvre Niortaise.
- The Bay of Brittany, now the Bay of Bourgneuf, north of Les Sables-d'Olonne, later evolved into the Breton Marsh.

Marine regression and silting, which began by the end of the Middle Ages, are clearly documented, notably by the Cassini map, one of the first reliable maps of France, produced around 1780.

== See also ==
=== Related articles ===
- Novioregum
- List of museums in France

== Bibliography ==
- Ptolemy. Geographia [Geography].
- Strabo. Geographica [Geography]. Vol. IV.
- "Route from Burdigala (Bordeaux) to Augustodunum (Autun)". Itinerarium Antonini [Antonine Itinerary].
- "Pars I (Segmentum I)". Tabula Peutingeriana [Peutinger Table]. Vienna: Hofbibliothek.
- Claude Masse. Mémoires [Memoirs].
- Bouet, Alain, ed. (2003). Thermae Gallicae. Les thermes de Barzan (Charente-Maritime) et les thermes des provinces gauloises [Thermae Gallicae. The Baths of Barzan (Charente-Maritime) and the Baths of the Gallic Provinces]. Bordeaux: Ausonius.
- Dassié, Jacques; Aupert, Pierre (1997–1998). "L'urbanisme d'une agglomération secondaire : nouvelles découvertes aériennes à Barzan" [The Urban Planning of a Secondary Settlement: New Aerial Discoveries at Barzan]. Aquitania. 15: 167–186.
- Fauduet, Isabelle (1993). Les temples de tradition celtique en Gaule romaine [Temples of Celtic Tradition in Roman Gaul]. Paris: Errance.

=== External links ===
- Les villes disparues : Tamnum, Novioregum, by Léon Massiou (1924)
- Archived page from the French National Geographic Institute about Barzan
- INSEE page for Barzan
- Charente-Maritime Department archaeological site page
- Extract from the Tabula Peutingeriana from Burdigala to Mediolanum Santonum and Vesonna (Bibliotheca Augustana)
