= Moulin du Fâ Temple =

Ancient temple in France

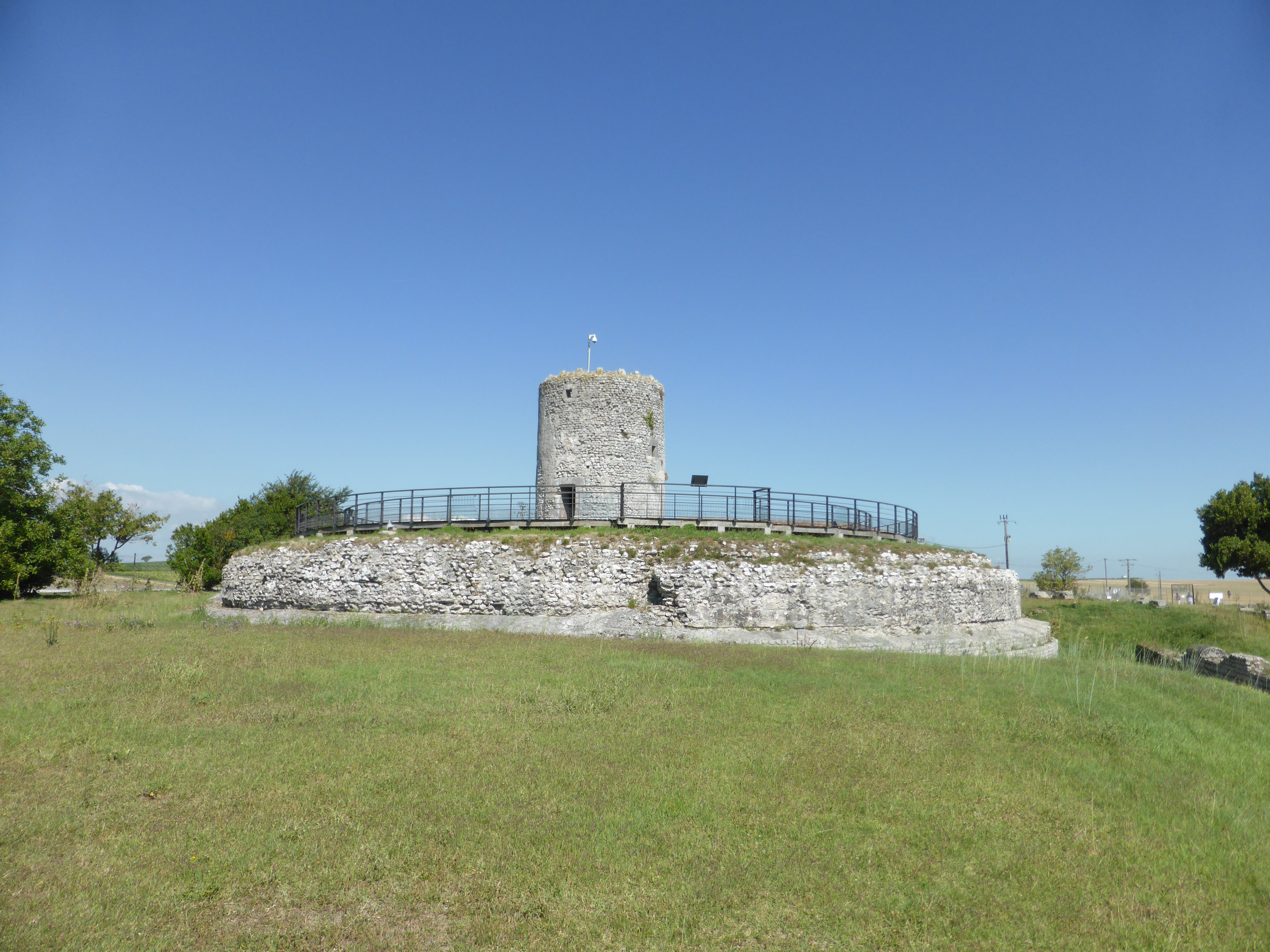
- Mill built on the temple grounds.

- Location within France
- 45°32′08″N 0°52′46″W
- Type: Romano-Celtic Temple
- Periods: Classical Antiquity
- Cultures: Santoni, Gallo-Roman
- Location: Barzan (France)
- Region: Nouvelle-Aquitaine

History
- Built: 2nd century

Site notes
- Material: Stone, Marble
- Length: 48 meters
- Width: 36 meters
- Excavation dates: 1920, 1935–1939,1956,1995,2000s
- Condition: Ruined, Repurposed
- Public access: Yes

Monument historique
- Designated: 1937, 1939

The Moulin du Fâ temple is the remains of a Romano-Celtic temple found at Barzan in Charente-Maritime, France.

Possibly dedicated to Mars, it is part of the relatively uncommon group of circular-plan temples in Roman Gaul. In the first half of the 2nd century, it replaced one or possibly two earlier sanctuaries. Its cella, with a diameter of 21 meters, stands at the center of a circular podium 36 meters in diameter, and the overall structure may have reached a height of approximately 40 meters. The remains survive at ground level, similar to other buildings of the secondary settlement—possibly identified as Novioregum—of which it was a part. The ruins were listed as historical monuments in 1937 or 1939.

== Location ==
The Gallo-Roman site of Barzan is generally identified with the stage Novioregum on the Antonine Itinerary. It is located in the commune of Barzan, approximately 1 km from the right bank of the Gironde estuary. The site includes a port with warehouses, baths, a theatre, and streets laid out according to an organized plan. Within this complex, the temple occupies a distinct position, standing apart from and overlooking the settlement.

== History of excavations and studies ==
The toponym “Moulin du Fâ” reflects the dual use of the site, where a modern mill was constructed on the location of an ancient fâ (fanum).

In 1839, a member of the Archaeological Society of Saintes identified the circular base supporting the mill as the remains of an ancient sanctuary. The first recorded descriptions of wall sections and marble slabs date from 1860.

Partial excavations and test pits carried out in 1920 confirmed the presence of a temple, although no comprehensive investigation was undertaken to determine its structure. In 1935, Louis Basalo conducted the first systematic excavations at the site, leading to the listing of the remains as a historic monument, but the work was halted in 1939 due to the Second World War. Test pits resumed in 1956 and in subsequent years, though their scope appears to have been limited. In 1995, Pierre Aupert resumed direction of the excavations, and his work, along with aerial surveys by Jacques Dassié, made it possible to produce an updated overall plan of the Moulin du Fâ site, particularly its sanctuary.

In the 2000s, the departmental archaeology service of Charente-Maritime, directed by Karine Robin, continued the excavations, with objectives that included identifying the protohistoric occupation of the site.

== Chronology and description ==
=== Chronology ===
A large protohistoric enclosure constitutes the earliest evidence of human occupation at the site. It may have served as an aristocratic residence or as a sanctuary associated with ritual banquets.

In the 1st century, possibly during the Flavian period, an initial ancient sanctuary was constructed. Only its peribolos is attested, following the layout of the protohistoric enclosure in the form of a right trapezoid. The northern wall supported numerous small rooms, likely service structures. The form of this peribolos influenced the layout of two roads running along its western and southern sides.

In the 2nd century, likely around the year 130, a new peribolos was constructed with a slightly modified alignment and orientation, reflecting changes in the urban layout. Within this enclosure, a circular cella was built, preceded on the east side by a pronaos. The complex did not occupy a central position within the peribolos, possibly to indicate the location of an earlier sanctuary.

=== Architectural features ===
The cella of the temple has a circular plan, a relatively uncommon form; in 2004, only nineteen comparable temples were recorded in France. The use of this plan may reflect earlier Celtic influences interpreted within the framework of Greco-Roman architectural conventions, as indicated by the presence of a podium and a Corinthian peristyle. The known dimensions of the temple correspond to multiples of the Roman foot (0.2957 m).

==== Podium, pronaos, and cella ====
Simplified plan of the temple (3rd state).

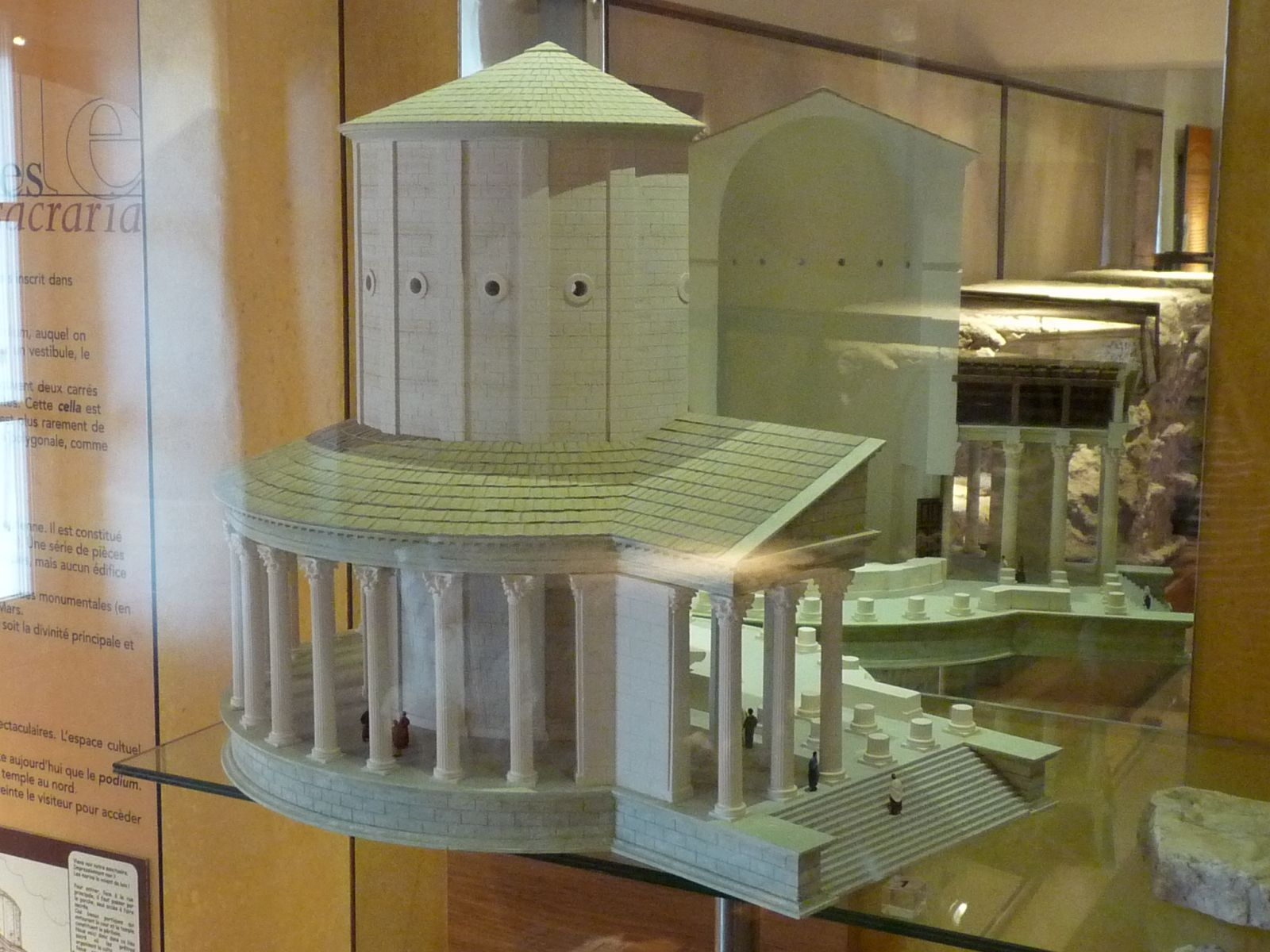
Hypothesis for the reconstruction of the temple.

The podium of the temple measures 36 meters in diameter and 2.95 meters in height. It consists of a 2-meter-thick load-bearing wall with a cornice, enclosing a mass of masonry reinforced by two perpendicular walls at the center. Around its perimeter, the podium supports a series of columns that carry the roof of a gallery adjoining the cella wall. Access to the podium is provided by a staircase flanked by two walls.

The pronaos measures slightly over 12 meters in depth and features a hexastyle façade, based on comparisons with similar monuments such as the Tower of Vésone in Périgueux. The columns of the façade rest on large ashlars embedded in the podium’s fill and likely supported a gabled roof, indicated above the façade by a triangular pediment.

The cella has an external diameter of 21 meters and an internal diameter of 15.4 meters, with its exterior wall articulated by decorative pilasters. Positioned at the center of the podium, it opens to the southeast through a 5-meter-wide doorway. The floor is paved with marble, and a niche is set into the wall opposite the entrance. The substantial thickness of the walls indicates that the structure was designed to support a heavy roof, possibly a masonry dome.

Pierre Aupert estimates the total height of the monument, including the podium, at slightly over 38 meters.

==== Peribolos ====
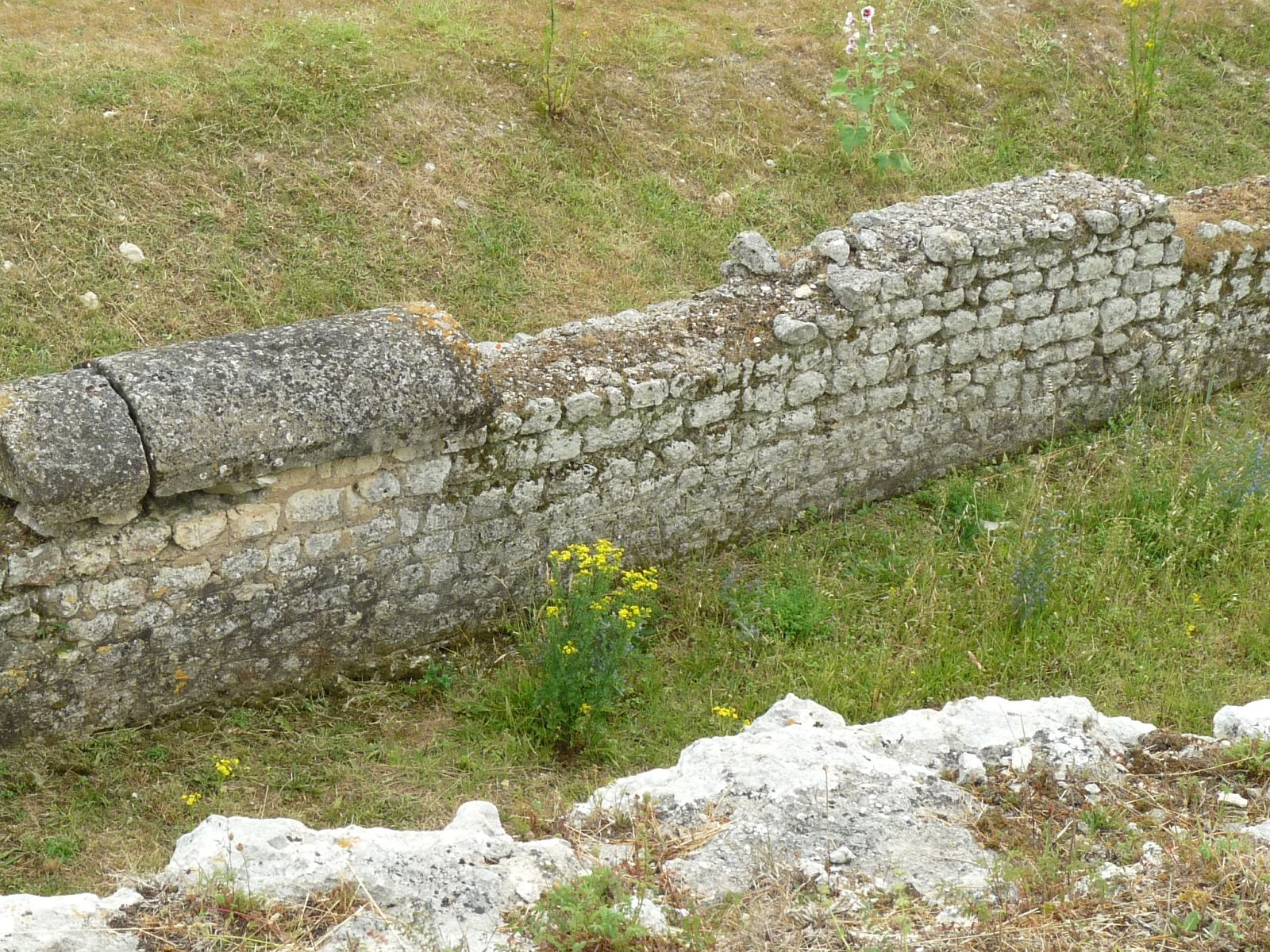
Peribolos wall.

The peribolos of the temple’s final phase forms an almost square enclosure approximately 100 meters on each side, likely bordered internally by colonnaded porticoes.Constructed in opus vittatum, it rests on a fill more than 2 meters thick that covers earlier masonry.

=== Dedication ===
The temple may have been dedicated to Mars, as indicated by a statue base found near the site in 1997 bearing, among other inscriptions, the mention “MART[.],” possibly in a local form, as suggested by the site’s earlier cultic history and the presence of niches in the cella. In any case, the shape and architecture of the temple provide no clear indication of its dedication; in Roman Gaul, the architectural form of a temple is not known to correspond to the cult practiced within it.

== Remains ==
The remains of the temple of the Moulin du Fâ visible above ground correspond mainly to the sanctuary in its final state. Particularly visible are the podium, including foundations and above-ground masonry in small rubble, and the beginning of the pronaos, as well as the base of the cella wall. The peribolos is exposed on the southern side of the temple, and excavations into its fill have uncovered sections of column shafts from the earlier phase of the sanctuary, buried in the 2nd century.

The remains of the temple were listed as a historic monument in 1937.

Remains of the temple.

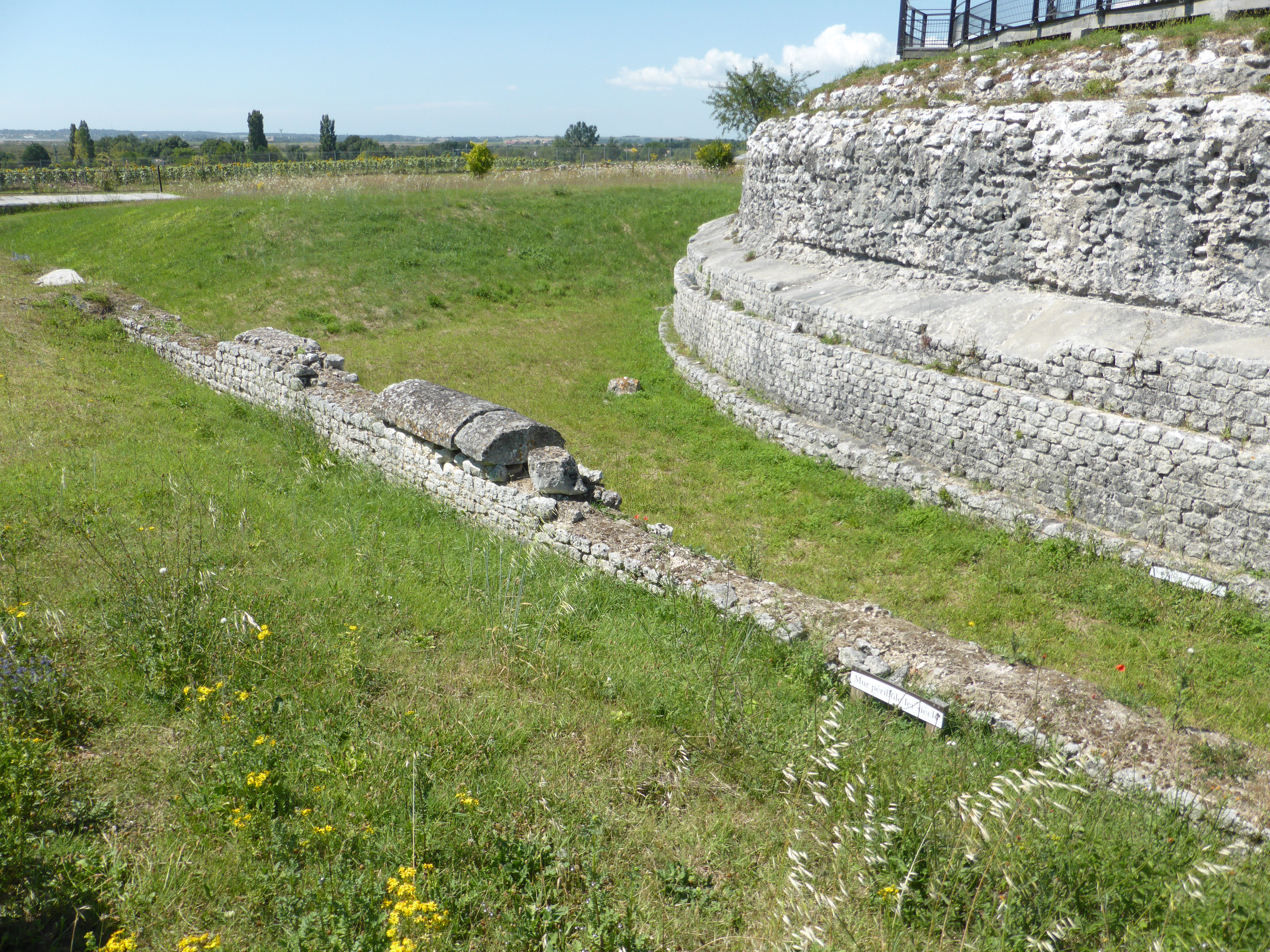
Peribolos wall and base of the podium.

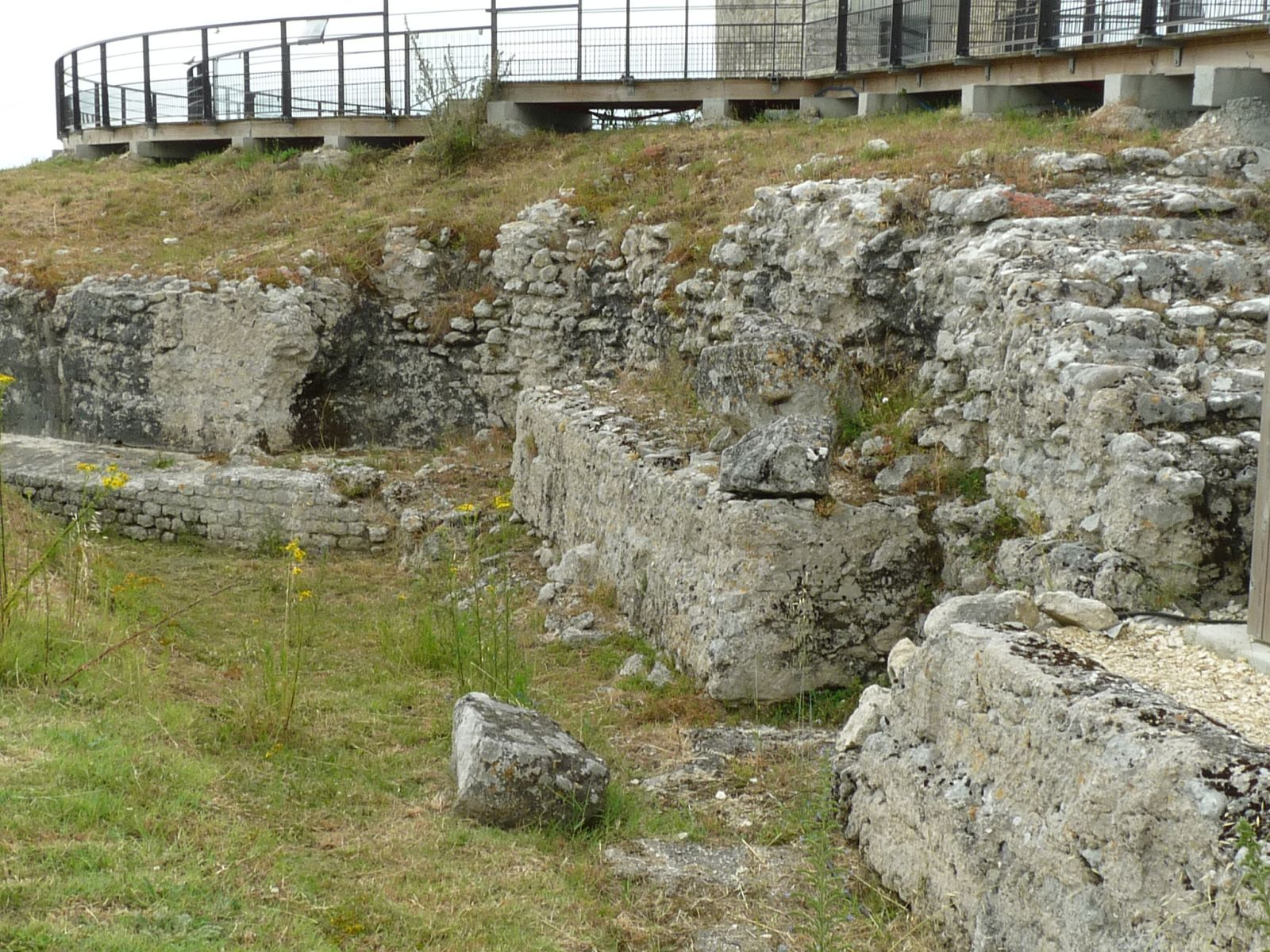
Podium and beginning of the pronaos.

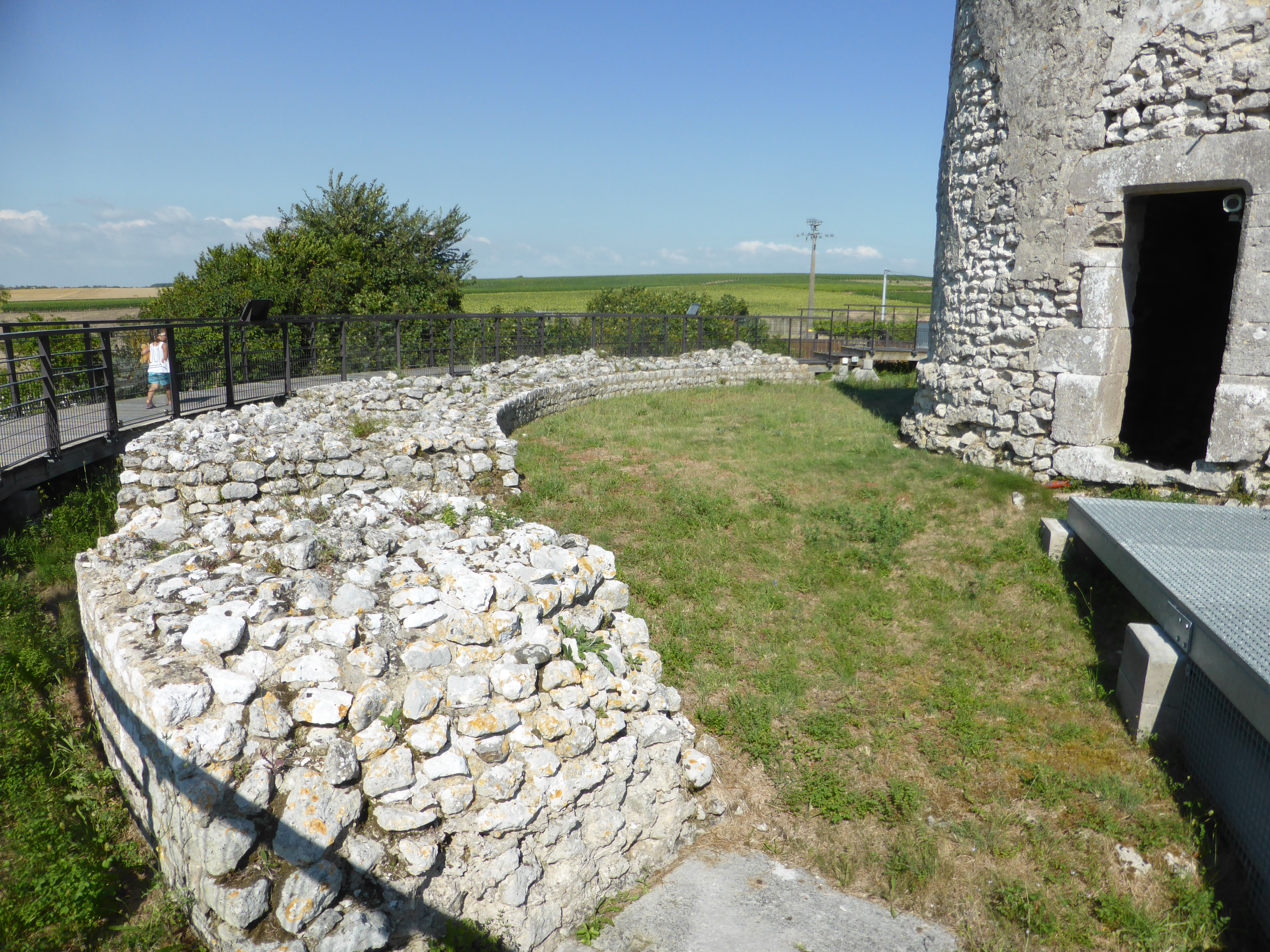
Wall of the cella.

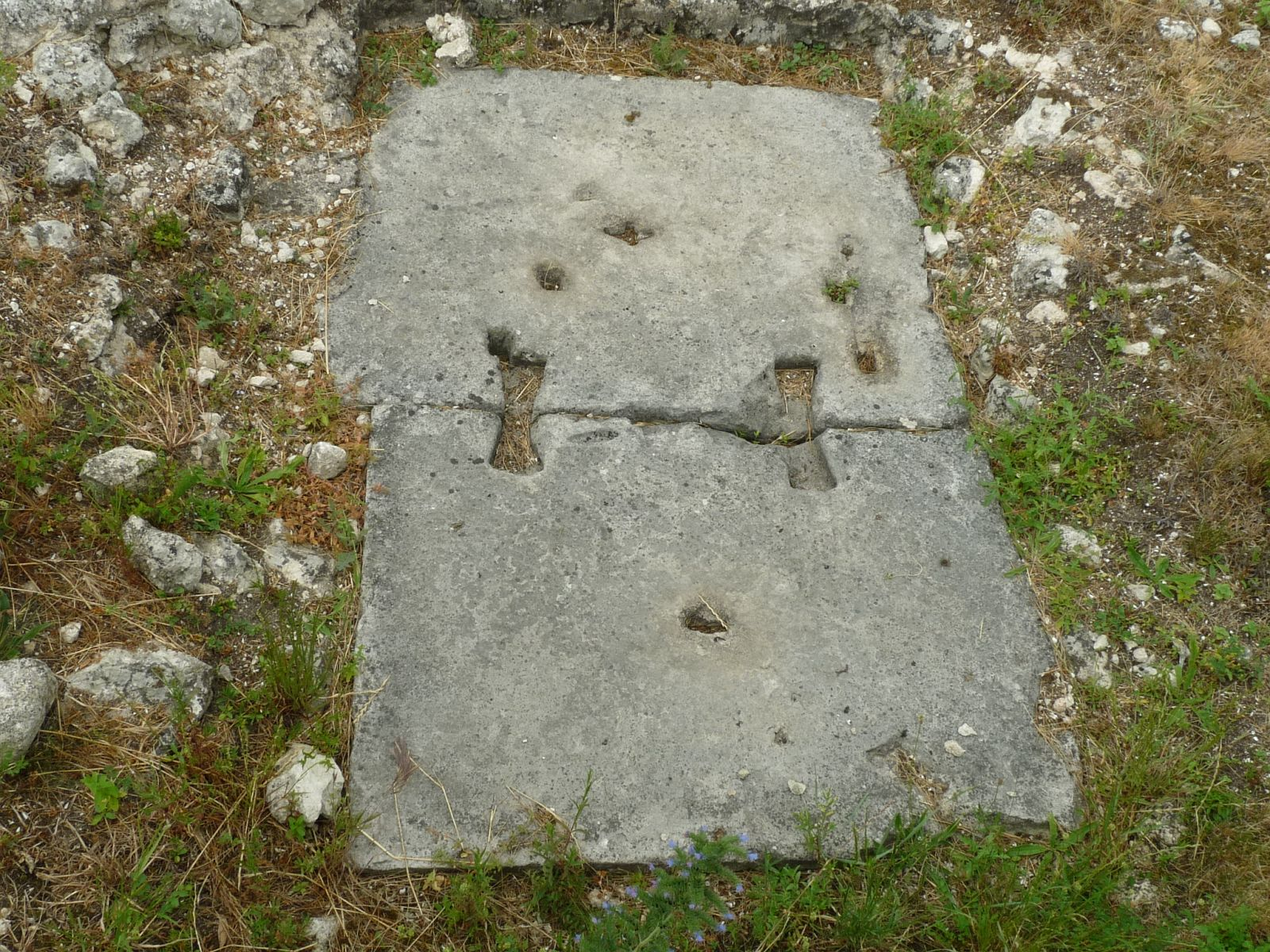
Base of the pilasters of the cella.

== See also ==
- Romano-Celtic temple
- Ancient history
- Novioregum
- Charente-Maritime

== Bibliography ==
- Fauduet, Isabelle (1993). Les temples de tradition celtique en Gaule romaine [Temples of Celtic tradition in Roman Gaul] (in French). Paris: Errance. pp. 152–153. ISBN 2-87772-074-8.
- Aupert, Pierre (2004). "Reconstitution du temple circulaire de Barzan et mathématiques grecques" [Reconstruction of the circular temple of Barzan and Greek mathematics] (PDF). Aquitania (in French). XX: 53–68. doi:10.3406/aquit.2004.1376.
- Basalo, Louis (1944). "Le temple du Moulin du Fâ (Charente- Maritime)" [The temple of Moulin du Fâ (Charente-Maritime)]. Gallia (in French). II: 141–165. doi:10.3406/galia.1944.1988.
- Lesson, René Primevère (1845). Histoire, archéologie et légendes des marches de la Saintonge [History, archaeology, and legends of the Saintonge region] (in French). H. Loustau. p. 220.
- Maurin, Louis (1999). Carte archéologique de la Gaule : 17/1 Charente-Maritime [Archaeological map of Gaul: 17/1 Charente-Maritime] (in French). Éditions de la MSH. ISBN 978-2-87754-061-2.
- Robin, Karine (2006). "Novioregum, ville portuaire antique" [Gallo-Roman site of Barzan]. 2006 (in French) (430): 36–45.
- Soyer, Claire; Robin, Karine (2003). "Un fragment d'anse de bassin étrusque découvert à Barzan (Charente-Maritime)" [A fragment of an Etruscan basin handle discovered in Barzan (Charente-Maritime)]. Aquitania (in French). XIX: 285–290.

=== External links ===
- "Les fouilles" [The excavations]. Le site du Fâ (in French). Musée et Site Gallo-Romains du Fâ. Archived from the original on March 3, 2014.
- "Parcelles de terrain" [Plots of land]. Mérimée (in French). Ministère de la culture.
- "ILA, Santons, 105 (16/1/12/235) Dédicace d'une statue à Mars" [ILA, Santons, 105 (16/1/12/235) Dedication of a statue to Mars]. PETRAE (in French). PETRAE. Archived from the original on May 10, 2023.
