= Novioregum =

Gallo-Roman vicus of the Civitas Santonum, likely located at Barzan, France

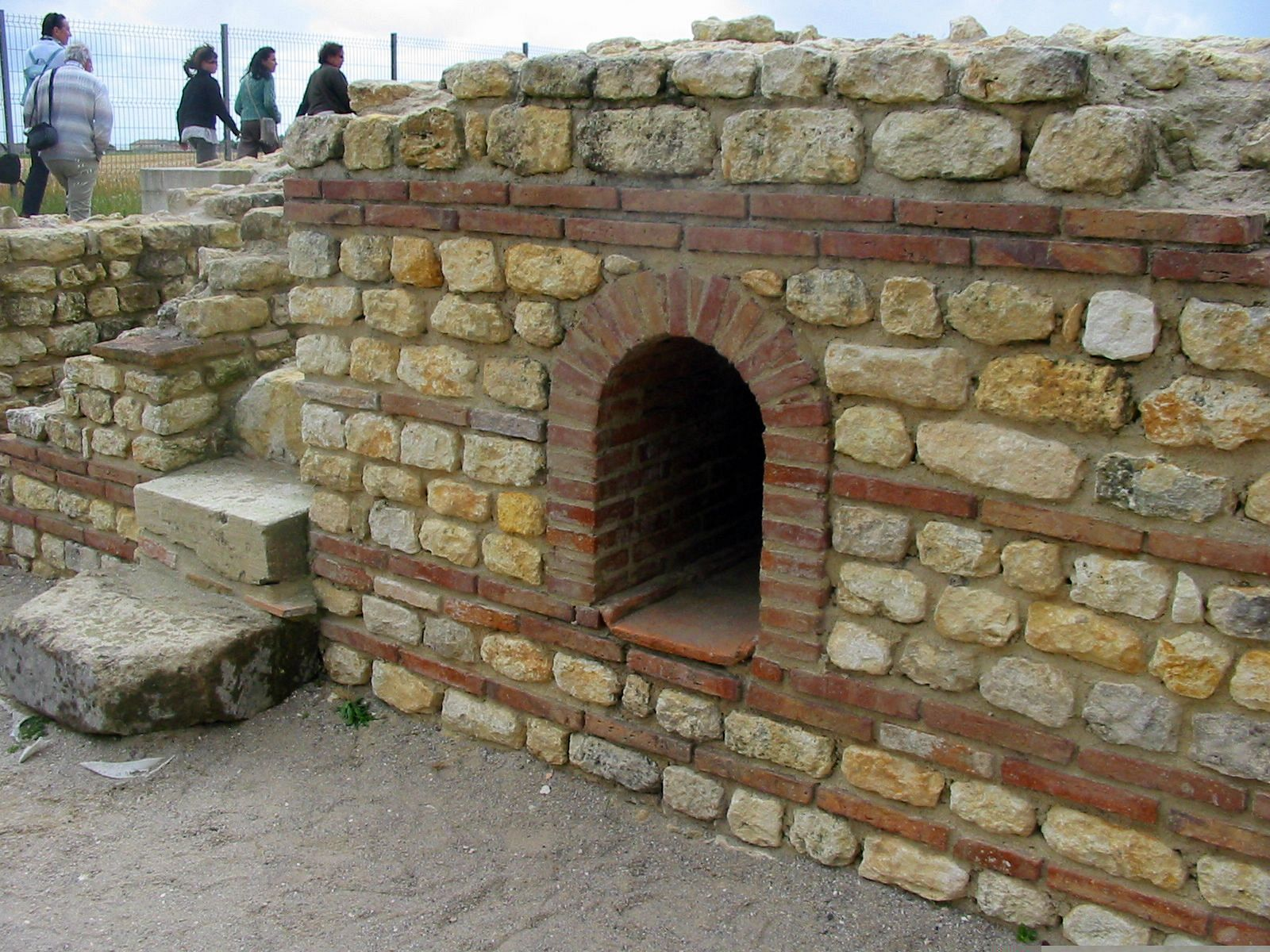
- Remains of the baths: oven used to heat the tepidarium (warm baths)
- Interactive map of Novioregum
- 45.5266666667°N 0.854722222222°W
- Type: Vicus
- Periods: Antiquity (Roman Empire)
- Location: Barzan, Charente-Maritime, Nouvelle-Aquitaine, France
- Region: Roman Empire: High Empire: Gallia Aquitania; Low Empire: Aquitania Secunda
- Part of: Civitas Santonum

Novioregum was a Gallo-Roman vicus within the Civitas Santonum, the administrative territory of the Santoni people. The settlement reached its peak in the 2nd century AD but was abandoned by the 4th or 5th century, leaving its precise location uncertain for centuries. Archaeological evidence now strongly suggests that Novioregum corresponds to the site of Le Fâ in Barzan, Charente-Maritime, France.

== Uncertain location ==
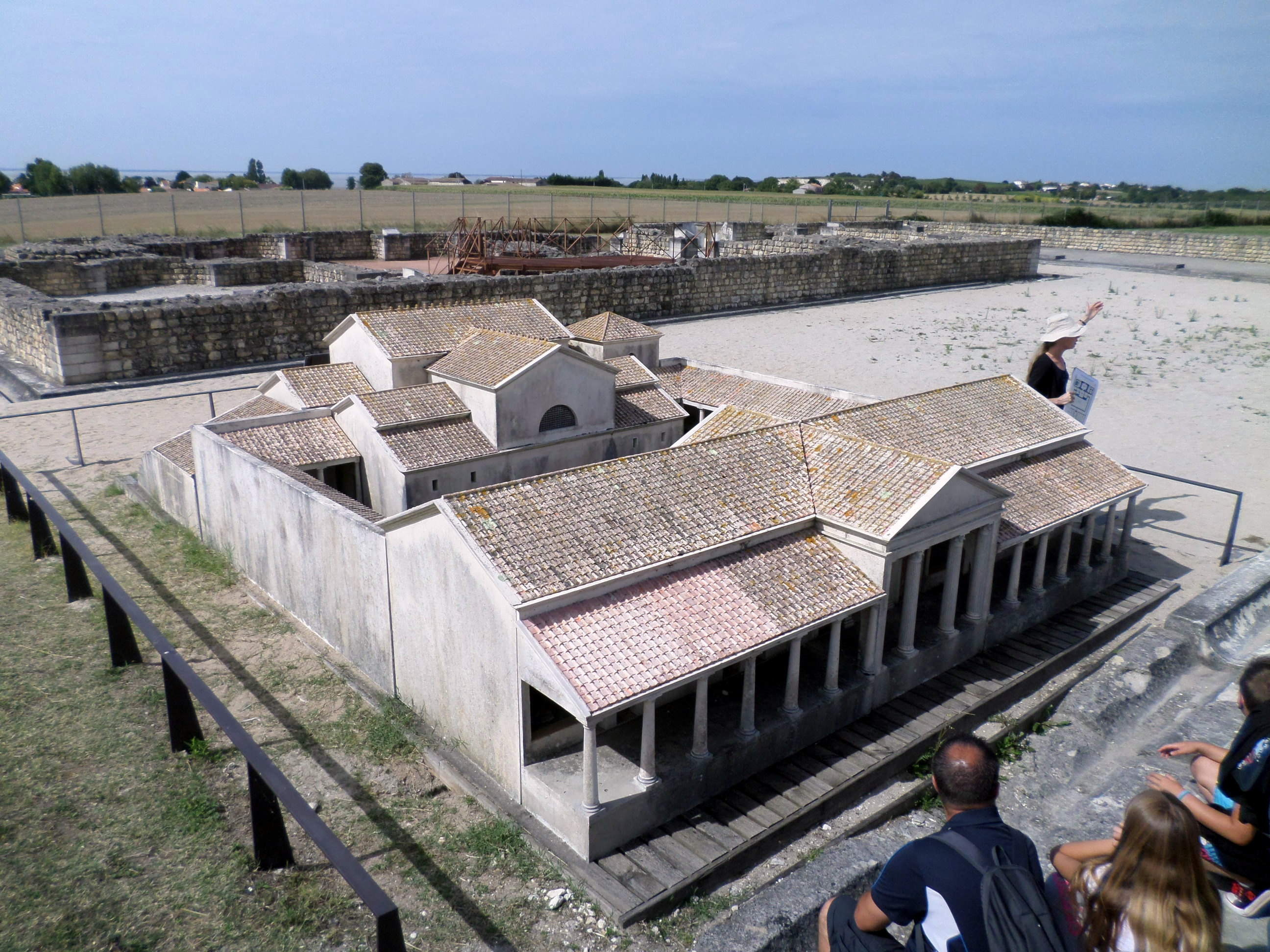
Model of the Roman baths at Le Fâ, Barzan, as they likely appeared in the 2nd century AD, with water features visible in the background.

The Antonine Itinerary, a Roman road guide from Bordeaux (Burdigala) to Autun (Augustodunum), places Novioregum along the route. It lists Blaye (Blauto) at 18 Roman miles from Bordeaux, Tamnum at 16 Roman miles from Blaye, Novioregum at 12 Roman miles from Tamnum, and Saintes (Mediolanum Santonum) at 15 Roman miles from Novioregum.

Novioregum may also correspond to the Portus Santonum, the port of the Santones, near the Promontorium Santonum described by Ptolemy. This port likely served as a landing point for deep-sea vessels and a hub for trade with Greek Marseille via the Garonne River, possibly along a tin trade route (Latin: stannum) from Great Britain.

The Peutinger Table, a medieval copy of a Roman map, omits Novioregum between Lamnu (likely a variant of Tamnum) and Mediolanum Santonum, possibly due to the site’s abandonment by the time the map was revised.

For centuries, the exact location of Novioregum remained elusive. Some scholars proposed Royan due to the apparent similarity between its name and (Novio)regum. Others, including local scholar Léon Massiou, suggested the Arvert Peninsula.

=== Historical hypotheses for Novioregum’s location ===
- Royan: Proposed by French geographer Jean-Baptiste Bourguignon d'Anville (1697–1782).
- Sablonceaux, Terrier de Toulon: Suggested by De la Sauvagère and Fleury in 1770.
- Arvert Peninsula: Advocated by Léon Massiou in 1912.
- Gallo-Roman site of Barzan: Proposed by Auguste Lacurie in 1844 and supported by Jacques Dassié in 1975.

As early as 1844, local scholar Abbé Auguste Lacurie hypothesized that the ruins at Barzan were those of Novioregum. This theory gained prominence after aerial surveys conducted by Jacques Dassié in 1975. Dassié argued that the distances in the Antonine Itinerary were based on the Gaulish league (approximately 2,450 m (2,680 yd)) rather than the Roman mile (1,482 m (1,621 yd)). This recalibration places Tamnum at Consac and Novioregum at the Gallo-Roman site of Barzan, located between Barzan, Talmont-sur-Gironde, and Arces-sur-Gironde.

== Rediscovery of Novioregum ==
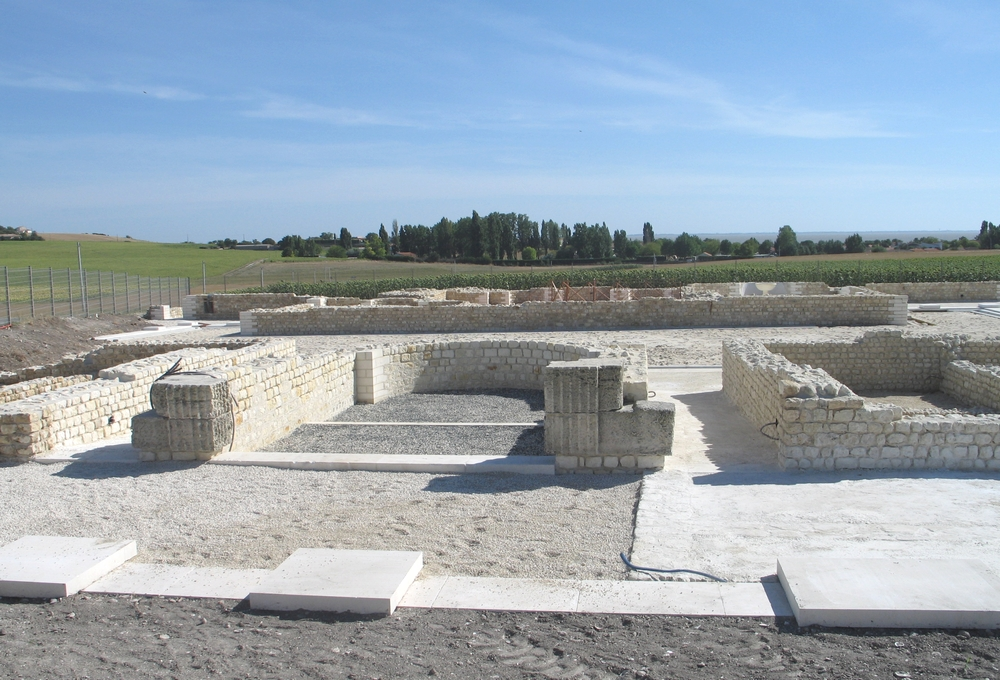
Roman baths at the Gallo-Roman site of Barzan

Although ancient ruins at Barzan were noted as early as the 17th century by royal engineer Claude Masse, their significance was initially underestimated. (Note: Claude Masse, writing between 1694 and 1715, noted: "About 1,100 toises from Talmont, tradition holds that there was once a famous city... The first visible proof is the base of a tower 13 to 14 toises in diameter, on which a mill called Le Fâ was built, believed to have been an ancient beacon. The second is the remains of a castle visible in 1708... The third proof is the quantity of ancient debris found... The fourth proof is the number of old coins, medals, and other antiquities found when the earth is disturbed." (Translated from French)) In 1844, Abbé Auguste Lacurie, secretary of the Archaeological Society of Saintes, proposed that these ruins were Novioregum. (Note: In 1844, Lacurie wrote: "Following the eastern slope of the hill, one arrives at the old city between Talmont and Barzan, where considerable ruins, extending far into the countryside, and the presence of two other roads attest to the existence of a highly significant Gallo-Roman establishment. This point is, for us, the Novioregum of the Antonine Itinerary." (Translated from Société archéologique de Saintes: Bulletin monumental, vol. 10, 1844)) This hypothesis faced skepticism, notably from Léon Massiou in 1924.

Subsequent excavations uncovered a temple, theatre, aqueduct, and expanded therms, confirming the site’s importance. Jacques Dassié’s 1975 aerial surveys revealed the site’s vast extent, covering nearly 140 hectares. Dassié noted: "The identification of Barzan with this site seems the most probable. Full validation awaits future epigraphic discoveries from excavations or surveys."

== Roman roads around Novioregum ==
According to Jacques Dassié (2003), Novioregum’s port at Barzan was connected to the Roman road network:

- Eastward to Saintes (Mediolanum Santonum), Germanicomagnus, Cassinomagus, and Augustoritum, and beyond to Lyon via the Via Agrippa.
- Eastward to Saintes, Condate, Sarrum (location uncertain), and Vesunna, and onward to Rome via Rodez along the Chemin Boisné.
- Southward to Tamnum, Blavia, and Burdigala, and further to Agen and Toulouse.
- North-northeast to Saintes, Aunedonnacum, Brigiosum, Rauranum, and Limonum, and beyond to Tours, Le Mans, Lisieux, and Rouen.

== Archaeological remains ==
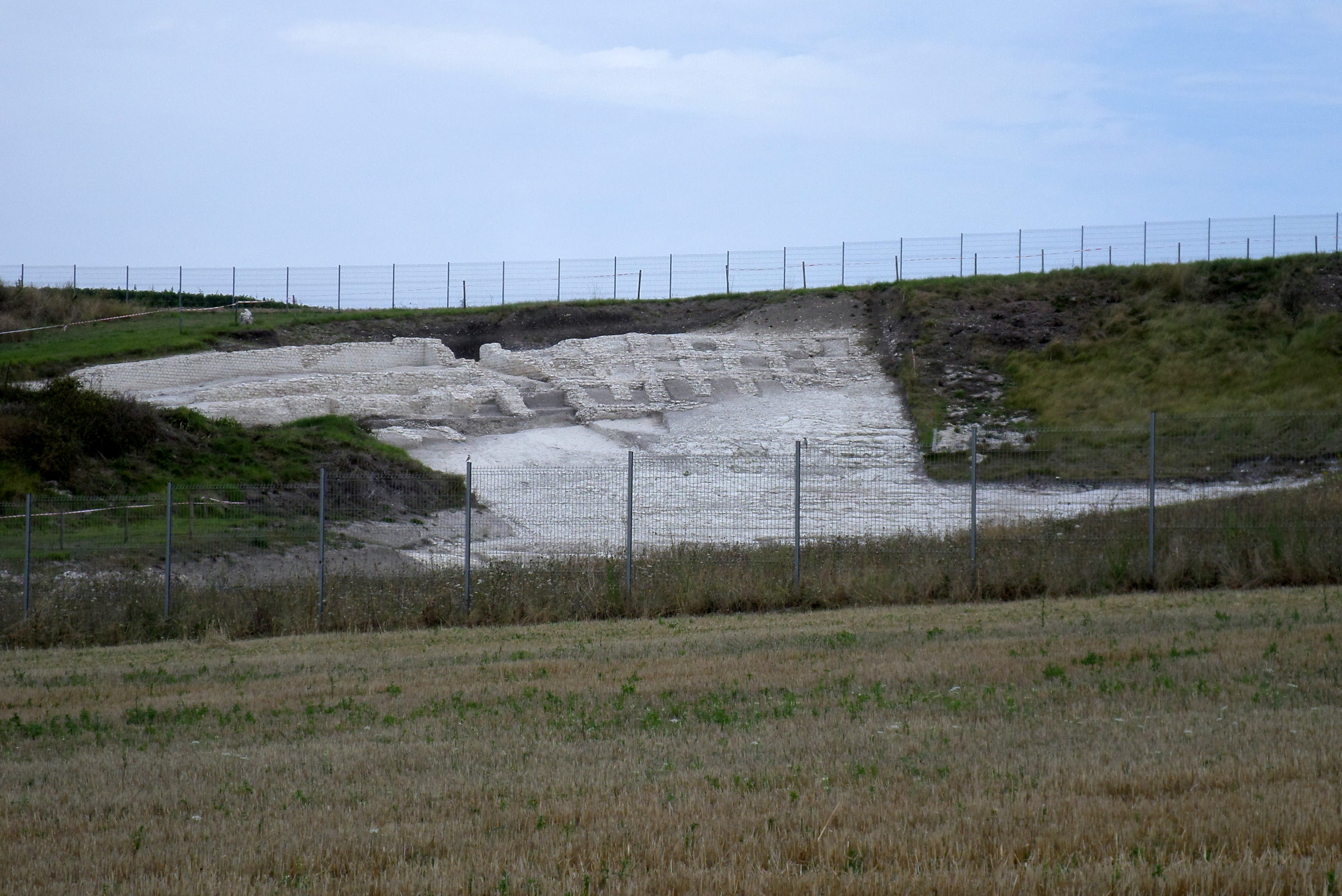
Remains of the Gallo-Roman theatre at Barzan, 2015

Excavations by the ASSA Barzan association, ongoing since 1994, have revealed a port city founded by the Celtic Santones and expanded during the first two centuries AD, likely as a commercial hub or emporium. Significant construction began under the Flavians (69–96 AD), evidenced by Corinthian capitals and statue fragments. The city flourished in the 2nd century under the Antonins, boasting:

- A theatre,
- A port,
- Warehouses,
- Temples,
- Expanded therms,
- Broad avenues.

Listed in the Antonine Itinerary (3rd century AD, under Diocletian), the city was abandoned by the 5th century, likely due to the silting of its port, a common issue in the region.

== Historical sources ==
- Ptolemy, Geography
- Strabo, Geography, Book IV, 11
- Antonine Itinerary, from Burdigala (Bordeaux) to Augustodunum (Autun)
- Peutinger Table, Pars I (Segmentum I), Hofbibliothek, Vienna
- Jacques Dassié, 1975.

== See also ==
- Roman Gaul
- Via Agrippa
- Antonine Itinerary
- Temple of the Moulin du Fâ
