= Saintonge (region) =

- Modern map showing the extent of the historical Saintonge province
- Coordinates: 45.75°N 0.633333°W
- Boroughs: Deux-Sèvres; Charente-Maritime; Charente
- Time zone: CET

Saintonge (French pronunciation: [sɛ̃tɔ̃ʒ]), historically spelled Xaintonge and Xainctonge, is a region of France located on the west central Atlantic coast, corresponding with the former province of the same name. The largest city is Saintes (Xaintes, Xainctes). Other principal towns include Saint-Jean-d'Angély, Jonzac, Frontenay-Rohan-Rohan, Royan, Marennes, Pons, and Barbezieux-Saint-Hilaire.

In 1790, during the French Revolution, Saintonge became part of Charente-Inférieure, one of the 83 departments organized by the new government. This was renamed as Charente-Maritime in 1941, during World War II. The region is known for its Romanesque churches.

== History ==
The region derives its name from the Santones, an ancient Gallic tribe that once inhabited the area. They were one of the numerous Celtic peoples in Europe before the rise of the Roman Empire.

During antiquity, Saintonge was part of the Roman province of Gallia Aquitania, and Saintes became its first capital. The region fell under the control of the kings and dukes of Aquitaine, the counts of Anjou, then the counts of Poitiers, before becoming integrated for centuries in the new Duchy of Aquitaine. Occupying the frontier between Capetian and Plantagenet-controlled areas during the late Middle Ages, between 1152 and 1451, it was the site of constant struggles between lords torn between their allegiance to Anglo-Aquitaine and those linked to Paris.

Saintonge was primarily attached to Anglo-Aquitaine until the mid-fourteenth century. However, errors by Henry of Grosmont, 1st Duke of Lancaster and Edward, the Black Prince gradually contributed to weakening English power. In 1451 the province came under the control of the King of France, Charles VII, "the Victorious".

Saintonge was the birthplace of French explorer Jean Allefonsce (or Alfonse) in 1484, and of Samuel de Champlain in 1574. The latter man explored the New World and founded Quebec in North America (now Canada). The town was also one of the centers of French Huguenots, who formed a center of Protestant belief in Southwest France.

The distinctive Saintongeais dialect (patouê saintonjhouê, jhabrail) was once spoken throughout Saintonge, as well as in the provinces of Aunis and Angoumois.

The region is famous for its grapes, which are used to produce cognac and Pineau des Charentes.

== Pottery ==
This area is famous for its medieval pottery, which was widely exported. Shards have been found in large quantities in medieval excavations throughout Ireland and other European countries, demonstrating the range of trading. These shards are from vessels made and exported as a by-product of the Bordeaux wine trade (Deroeux and Dufournier, 1991). This ware has been found on Irish excavations from the later 12th century, but it is most commonly uncovered in 13th-century contexts.

The pottery consists of an off-white micaceous fabric with moderate amounts of quartz and sparse inclusions of haematite. They are glazed on the external surface only, with a clear lead glaze. In Saintonge Green wares, the addition of copper filings, or copper oxide to the clear lead glaze, produced a mottled mid-green colouring. Many forms of Saintonge wares were produced, including Saintonge Polychrome, Saintonge Green, and, in some cases, unglazed wares. Slipped Saintonge is more consistent in colour and appearance than unslipped, having the benefit of an undercoating to regulate the process.

The most common forms of vessel produced in this ware were wine jugs. These were characteristically tall, with slightly ovoid bodies, flat bases, parrot-beak spouts and strap handles.

Saintonge was exported well through the 17th century. French colonists in Quebec and Acadians in Eastern Canada imported many Saintonge ceramics, including bowls, plates, mugs and other types. Many Saintonge ceramic fragments have been found in context with 17th-century French colonists. They are often used as evidence of French occupation of these areas prior to British dominance.

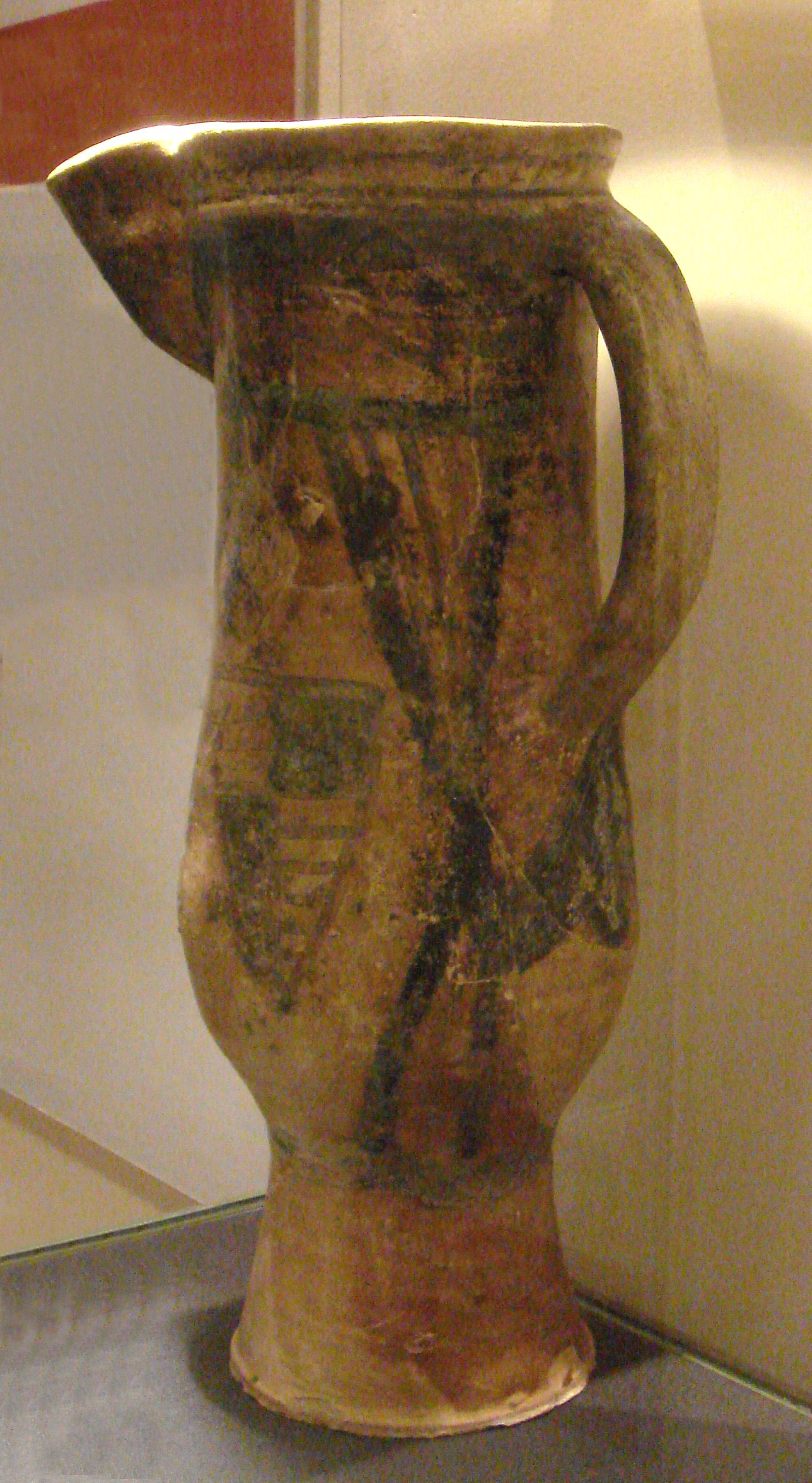
Saintonge jug (1275–1350) exported to London. Now held in the museum of the Tower of London.

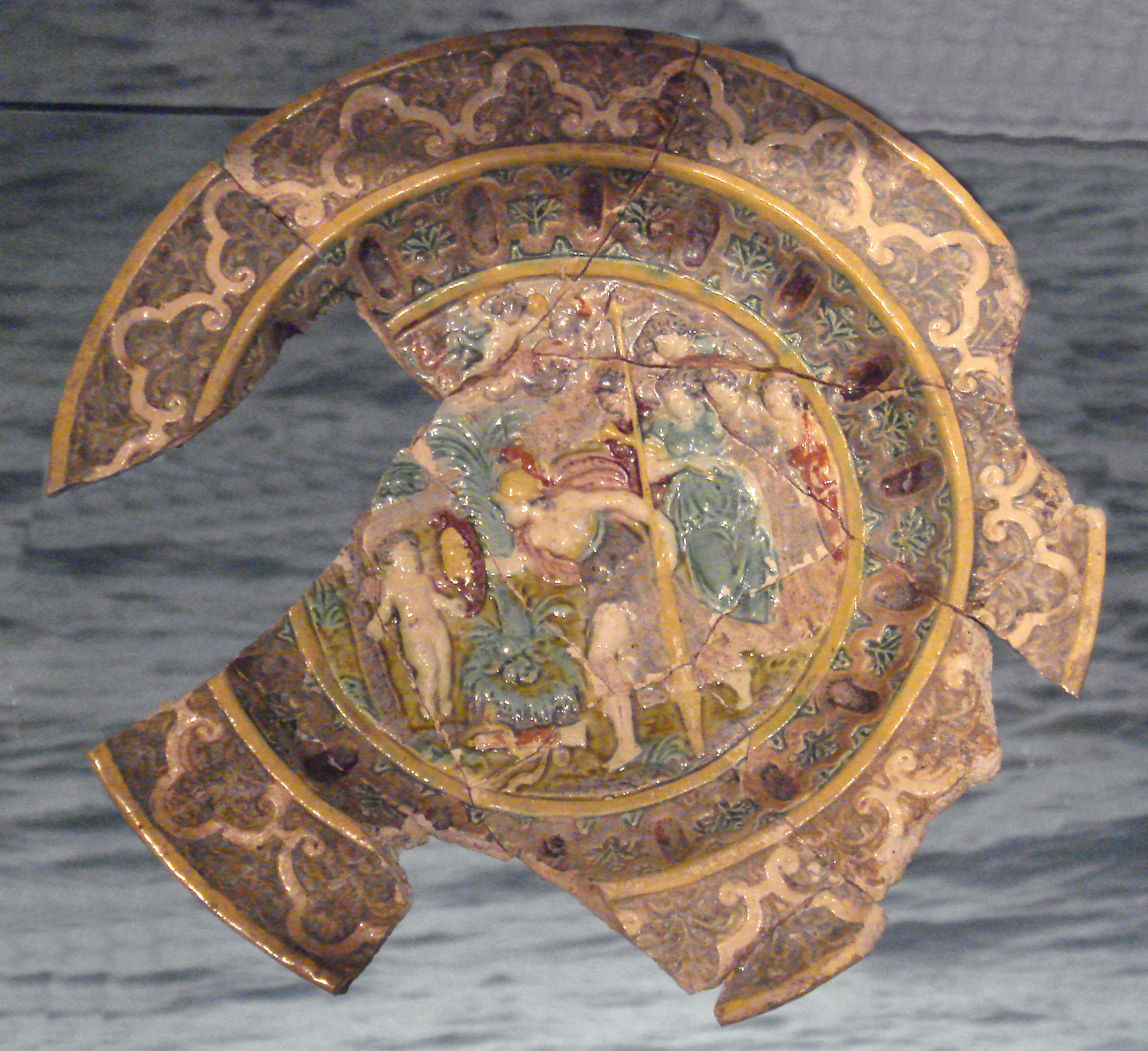
Saintonge polychrome dish in the style of Bernard Palissy, mid-1500s, excavated in London. Museum of London.
