= Talmont-sur-Gironde =

- Commune
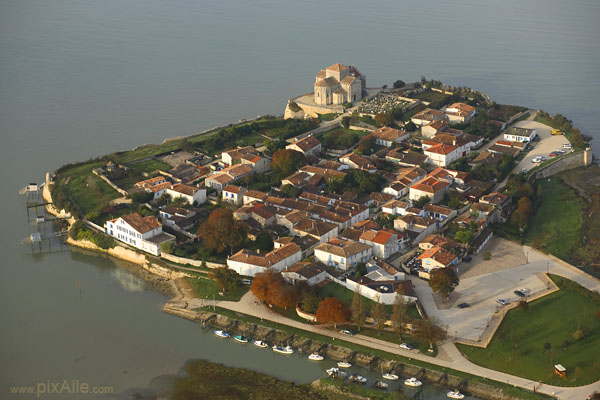
- An aerial view of the bastide in the Gironde estuary

- Coat of arms
- Location of Talmont-sur-Gironde
- Location within France Location within Nouvelle-Aquitaine
- Coordinates: 45°32′10″N 0°54′24″W
- Country: France
- Region: Nouvelle-Aquitaine
- Department: Charente-Maritime
- Arrondissement: Saintes
- Canton: Saintonge Estuaire
- Intercommunality: CA Royan Atlantique

Government
  - Mayor (2020–2026): Alain Grasset
- Area^{1}: 4.44 km^{2} (1.71 sq mi)
- Highest elevation: 24 m (79 ft)
- Lowest elevation: 0 m (0 ft)
- Population (2023): 77
  - Density: 17/km^{2} (45/sq mi)
- Time zone: UTC+01:00 (CET)
  - Summer (DST): UTC+02:00 (CEST)
- INSEE/Postal code: 17437 /17120
- ^{1} French Land Register data, which excludes lakes, ponds, glaciers > 1 km^{2} (0.386 sq mi or 247 acres) and river estuaries.

Talmont-sur-Gironde (French pronunciation: [talmɔ̃ syʁ ʒiʁɔ̃d], literally Talmont on Gironde, before 1996: Talmont) is a commune in the Charente-Maritime department in the Nouvelle-Aquitaine region in southwestern France.

== Geography ==
The village lies about 15 km (9.3 mi) south of Royan, on a small promontory which dominates the Gironde estuary. It appears to be 'perched' on this rocky outcrop, in a way that it occupies every square millimetre of space. Tiny beaches can be found at the base of the fortifications, which mostly are sheer from the sea. Inland there is marshy country and a small waterway runs alongside the south wall of the village.

== Population ==
Historical population
| Year | Pop. | ±% p.a. |
|---|---|---|
| 1968 | 115 | — |
| 1975 | 92 | −3.14% |
| 1982 | 79 | −2.15% |
| 1990 | 83 | +0.62% |
| 1999 | 83 | +0.00% |
| 2007 | 78 | −0.77% |
| 2012 | 103 | +5.72% |
| 2017 | 100 | −0.59% |
| 2023 | 77 | −4.26% |
Source: INSEE

== Sights ==
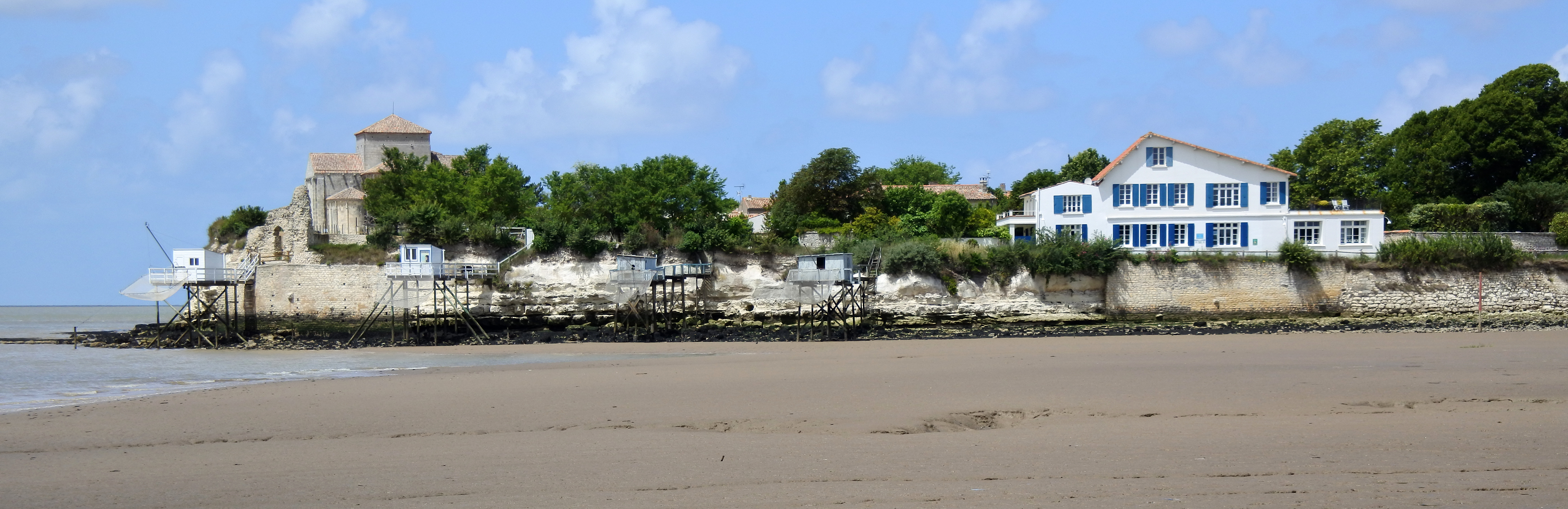
Talmont-sur-Gironde from the south.

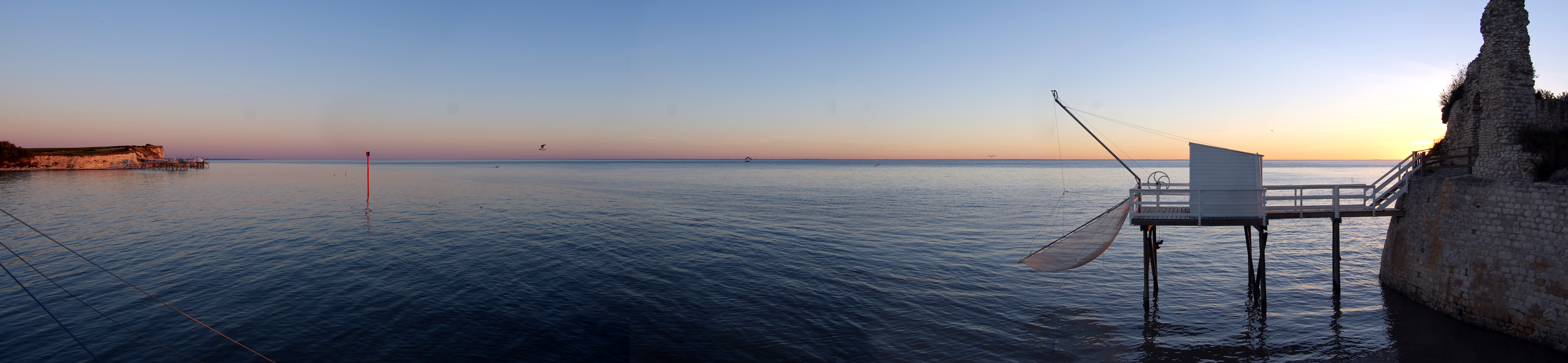
Carrelet at Talmont-sur-Gironde

The village is a member of the Les Plus Beaux Villages de France ("The most beautiful villages of France") association.

The village is known for its show of hollyhocks, which intrude on the tiny pedestrian-only streets between the small houses.

=== Church of St Radegonde ===
The church of St Radegonde was built in 1094. The structure appears quite 'squat' and is Romanesque in character. The church was a resting place for the Pilgrimage of Saint James of Compostela on the via Turonensis, because the pilgrims crossed the Gironde at this spot (Voie de Soulac Littoral Aquitain).

== History ==
The enclosed and fortified village was founded around the church in 1284, according to the plans of the ancient bastides, on the orders of Edward I of England. During the Hundred Years' War which divided England and France, Talmont became a strategic stake. In 1652, the village was destroyed by the Spaniards.

== Personalities ==
- Louis II de la Trémoille, prince of Talmont.

== See also ==
- Communes of the Charente-Maritime department
- The pilgrimage of St James of Compostela
