= Peribolos =

Enclosure in ancient Greek and Roman architecture

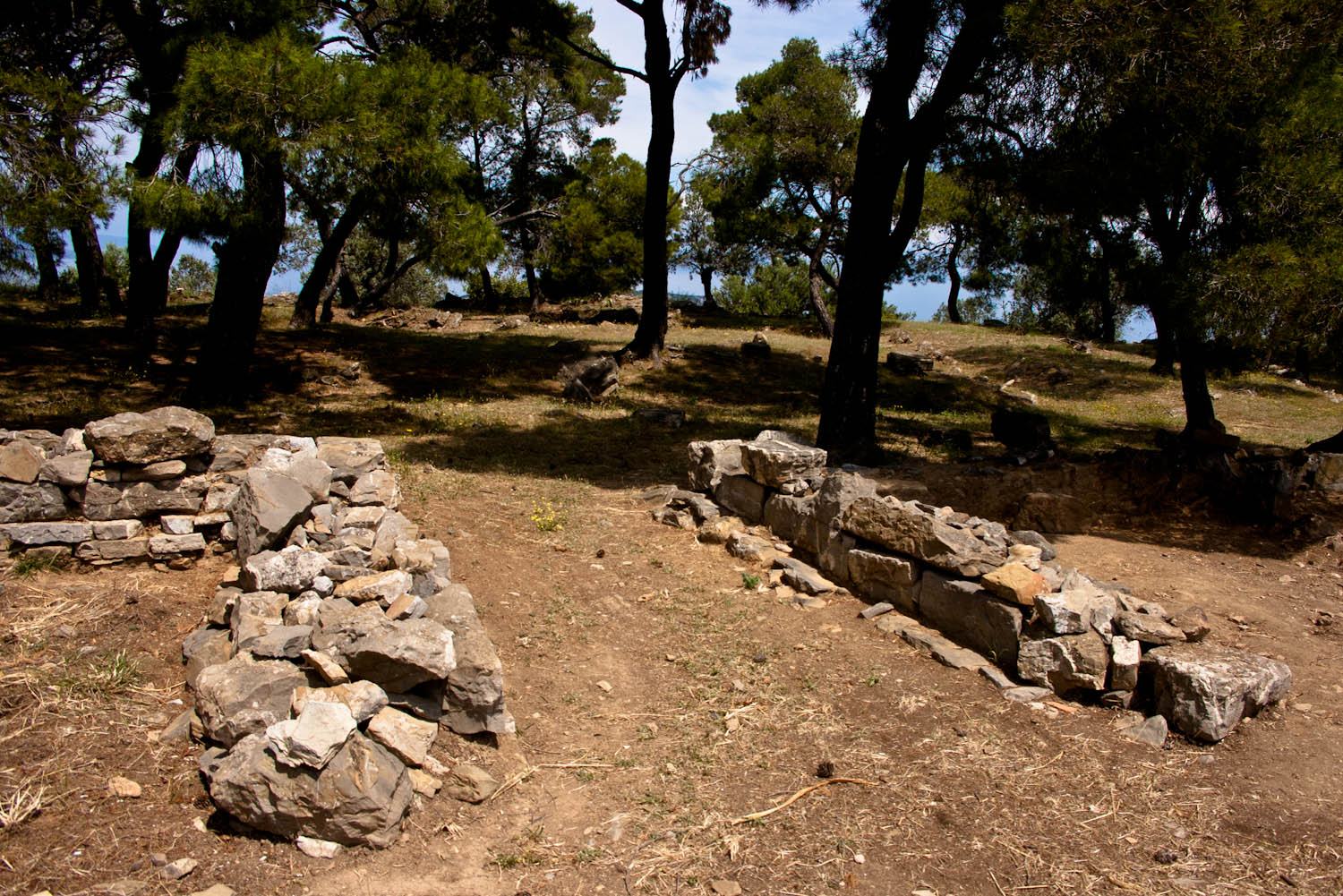
Sanctuary of Poseidon, Kalaureia

In ancient Greek and Roman architecture, a peribolos was a court enclosed by a wall, especially one surrounding a sacred area such as a temple, shrine, or altar. This area, however, is not a necessary element to these structures since those built earlier only included markers (e.g. horoi or boundary stones) to indicate imaginary boundaries. Excavations reveal that there are sanctuaries that included a peribolos later in its history, signifying a change in religious mentality. During the Roman times, there were periboloi used as meeting places to conduct business (e.g. shipping).

Peribolos walls (which may also be referred to as temenos walls) were sometimes composed of stone posts and slabs supported by porous sills.

Famous examples included:

- the peribolos wall and gate in the Sanctuary of Zeus (Altis), north of the Temple of Zeus at Olympia, Greece;
- the peribolos enclosing the Altar of the Twelve Gods near the north end of the Athens ancient Agora; and
- the terrace created by retaining and peribolos walls around the Sanctuary of Athena Pronaia (Marmaria), southeast of the Sanctuary of Apollo at Delphi, Greece.

== See also ==
- Sacellum
