= Consac =

- Commune
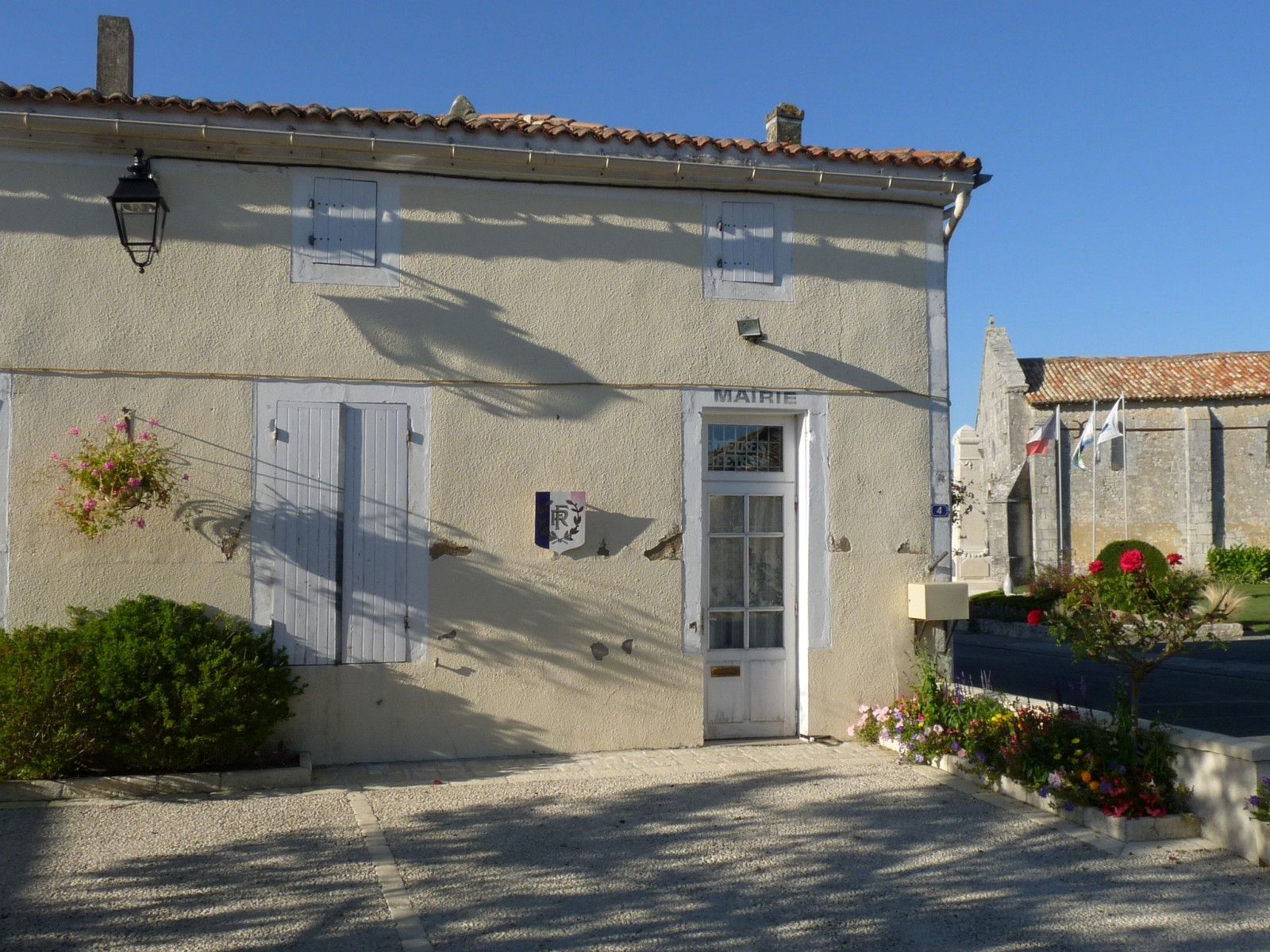
- The town hall in Consac
- Location of Consac
- Location within France Location within Nouvelle-Aquitaine
- Coordinates: 45°25′07″N 0°35′38″W
- Country: France
- Region: Nouvelle-Aquitaine
- Department: Charente-Maritime
- Arrondissement: Jonzac
- Canton: Jonzac

Government
  - Mayor (2020–2026): Marie-Hélène Vallier
- Area^{1}: 9.13 km^{2} (3.53 sq mi)
- Elevation: 80 m (260 ft)
- Highest elevation: 102 m (335 ft)
- Lowest elevation: 30 m (98 ft)
- Population (2023): 236
  - Density: 25.8/km^{2} (66.9/sq mi)
- Time zone: UTC+01:00 (CET)
  - Summer (DST): UTC+02:00 (CEST)
- INSEE/Postal code: 17116 /17150
- ^{1} French Land Register data, which excludes lakes, ponds, glaciers > 1 km^{2} (0.386 sq mi or 247 acres) and river estuaries.

Consac (French pronunciation: [kɔ̃sak]) is a commune in the Charente-Maritime department in the Nouvelle-Aquitaine region in southwestern France.

== Population ==
Historical population
Year	Pop.	±% p.a.
1968	260	—
1975	225	−2.04%
1982	234	+0.56%
1990	210	−1.34%
1999	240	+1.49%
2007	242	+0.10%
2012	238	−0.33%
2017	211	−2.38%
2023	236	+1.88%
Source: INSEE

== See also ==
- Communes of the Charente-Maritime department
