= Santoni (tribe) =

Gallic tribe

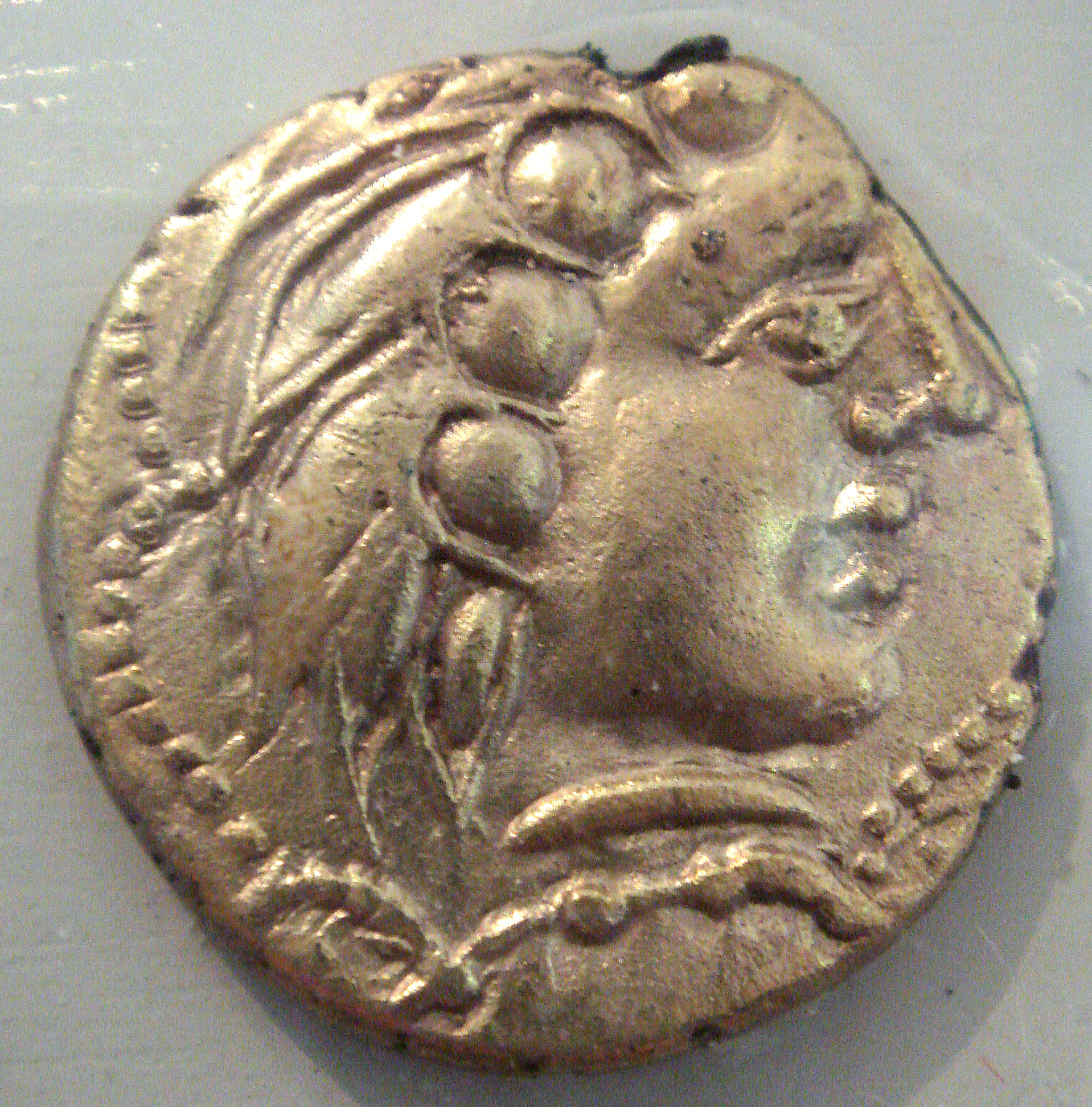
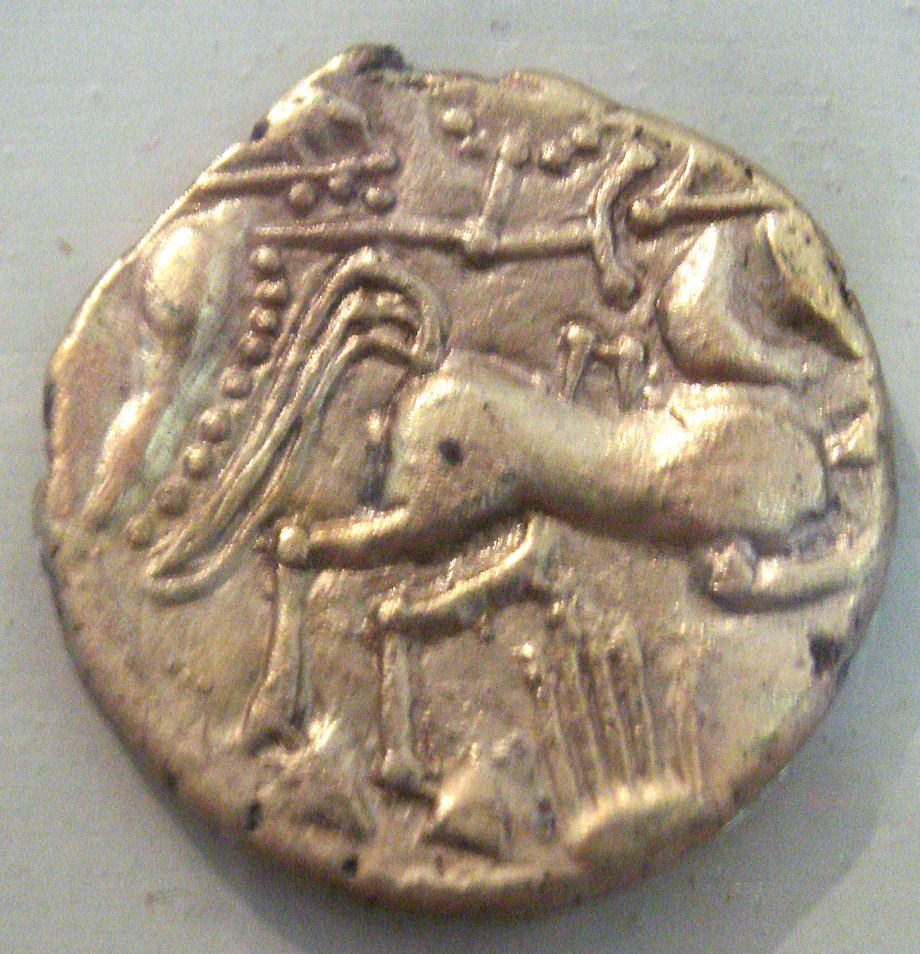
Gold coins of the Santones, 5-1st century BCE. Early Gallic coins were often inspired by Greek coinage.

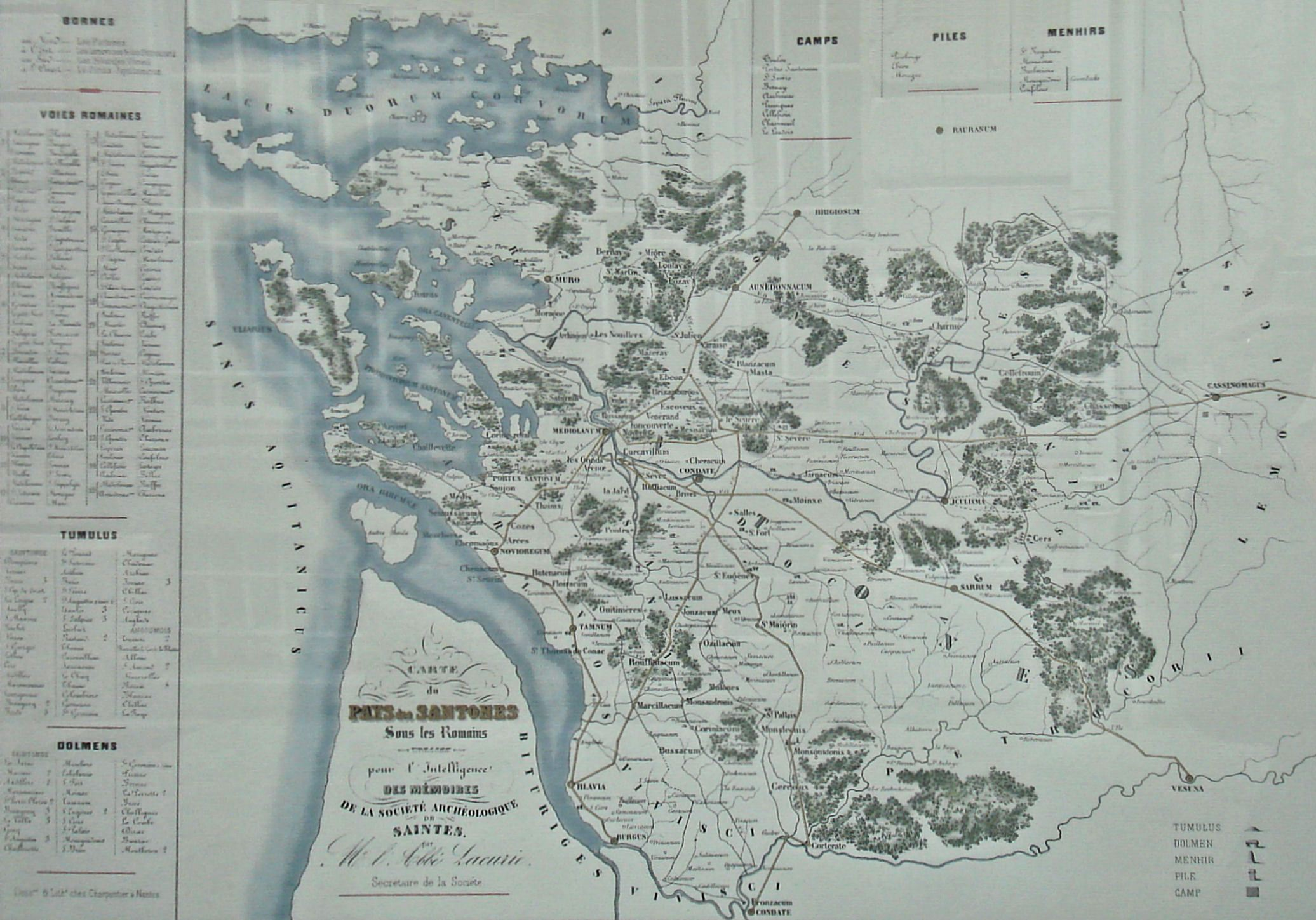
Country of the Santones during Roman times.

The Santoni or Santones (Ancient Greek: Σαντόνων, Σάντονες) were a Gallic tribe dwelling in the later region of Saintonge during the Iron Age and the Roman period.

== Name ==
These people are noted as Santonum, Santonos and Santonis by Caesar (mid-1st c. BC), Santónōn (Σαντόνων) by Strabo (early 1st c. AD), Santoni by Pliny (1st c. AD), Santonis by Pomponius Mela (mid-1st c. AD) and Tacitus (early 2nd c. AD), as Sántones (Σάντονες, var. Σάντωνες) by Ptolemy (2nd c. AD).

The city of Saintes, attested in the 1st c. AD as Mediolanum Santonum (a Sanctone in the 10th c., Xainctes 11th c.) and the region of Saintonge, attested in the 4th c. AD as Santonica tellus (Xanctonia in 1242, Zantonge ca. 1370), are named after the Gallic tribe.

== Geography ==
The Santoni lived in the north of the Garonne estuary, in the modern Saintonge region.

During the Roman period, their chief town was Mediolanum Santonum (modern Saintes).

== History ==
Their territory was the destination of the failed migration of the Helvetii circa 58 BC, which they opposed along with the Pictones. Initially, they cooperated with Julius Caesar's navy and traded goods. Later, Caesar's plans for conquest of the Gallic tribes divided them.

They provided 12,000 men to the Gallic coalition against Rome at the Battle of Alesia in 52 BC.
