= AKSHI public procurement scandal =

Public procurement scandal in Albania

AKSHI public procurement scandal refers to a major corruption investigation in Albania, made public in late 2025 and led by the Special Structure against Corruption and Organized Crime (SPAK), on the manipulation of public procurement procedures within the National Agency for Information Society (Agjencia Kombëtare e Shoqërisë së Informacionit, AKSHI). It has been described as one of the largest corruption investigations in Albania in the last decades.

The procurement offers under investigation are mainly related to maintenance of servers for key governmental institutons, and are of high value, with estimates around 750 million to 1.5 billion euros. SPAK alleges that the public procurement procedures were systematically manipulated to favor a network of companies under the ownership of Ergys Agasi and Ermal Beqiri, resulting in significant financial damage to the state budget.

AKSHI is a governmental agency that manages a large part of the digital governance system in Albania, including the e-Albania platform and hosts sensitive informations of Albanian citizens.

== The case ==
On December 16, 2025, after one year of background work, SPAK made public a high-profile investigation, announced charges and issued security measures against eight officials and businessmen involved in AKSHI public procurement manipulation scheme. Prosecutors allege that a sophisticated criminal network rigged at least twelve public procurement procedures. The investigators questioned around 25 AKSHI officials, including members of the public procurement complaints commission. A decisive testimony that helped SPAK build the case was that of Daniel Shima, a former AKSHI deputy director, who said that the corruptive actions were carried out under direct orders from Mirlinda Karçanaj.

AKSHI Director Mirlinda Karçanaj and her deputy Hava Delibashi were placed under house arrest, while the deputy director for Criminal Investigations in the Tirana Police, Erjon Ismaili, was suspended from duty. Several other officials were hit with travel bans or mandatory reporting requirements.

Central to the investigation are businessmen Ermal Beqiri and Ergys Agasi. SPAK issued arrest warrants for both Agasi and Beqiri, with charges including money laundering, illegal competition, unlawful deprivation of liberty (kidnapping of competitor Gerond Meçe), violation of procurement offer equality, and participation in a structured criminal group. Agasi and Beqiri were not found during the execution of the warrants and were declared wanted. Ergys Agasi's name was previously mentioned by fugitive former Deputy Prime Minister Arben Ahmetaj, during an interview for Italian investigative TV program Report, as “the coordinator between the prime minister and criminal groups”.

Authorities also charged three other businessmen, Andis Papa, Gëzim Hoxha, and Rogers Rryta, who were banned from leaving Albania and suspended from duty. All three are accused of participating in the manipulation scheme in one way or another, by issuing fake invoices of conducting transactions with companies who were not genuine participants in the procurement competition.

Prosecutors state that intercepted communications, digital recordings, and financial trails provide compelling evidence that lucrative contracts were deliberately steered toward predetermined companies linked to Beqiri and his collaborators.

=== Kidnapping of Gerond Meçe ===
A key element of the investigation involved an episode in which Agasi and Beqiri, in collaboration with police officers, are suspected to have took their competitor Gerond Meçe hostage for several hours forcing him to withdraw, after he had filed complaints about the procurement procedures.

== Continued contract payments despite investigation ==
An investigative report on February 2026, found that even after the SPAK investigation was publicly announced on 16 December 2025, payments from the governmental budget to companies involved in the investigation still continued. Data from platforms on public spending transparency, show that companies connected to the suspects kept receiving payments. This has raised questions, about the persistence of networks, and why payments and contracts were not suspended or reviewed, given the corruption charges and the ongoing investigation.

== Asset seizures ==
In April 2026, SPAK seized around 52 properties and several bank accounts with a total value of around 40 million euros. The seized assets were in the names of 5 persons under investigation. The seized assets include apartments in Tirana and on the sea coast, bank accounts, agricultural land, automobiles, garages, and a luxury yacht named "Skyfall" registered under the name of Ermal Beqiri.

Despite Prime Minister Edi Rama's previous claim that she was living in a rented home, former AKSHI director Mirlinda Karçanaj had multiple assets seized by the prosecutors, including three apartments, 1500 m^{2} parcel of land in Sauk, bank accounts and a Volkswagen Tiguan.

=== Money laundering and asset concealment ===
SPAK indicated that proceeds from the scheme were laundered through complex financial and real estate transactions involving intermediaries and nominal owners. Some transactions involved employees of the involved IT companies acting as nominal buyers or sellers, in order to conceal the real ownership of the assets. In some cases, properties were reportedly transferred multiple times at below-market values, when the real value of these assets significantly exceeded the declared transaction prices, before being registered under the names of the relatives or associates of the suspects.
