= Francis Allard =

French academic and engineer

Francis Allard is a French academic, engineer and Distinguished Professor in Civil Engineering. Since February 2017, Allard is professor emeritus at La Rochelle University and Chairman of Tipee (Building Innovation Platform). He has expertise in heat and mass transfer phenomena with application in energy efficiency and indoor environment in buildings and urban microclimate.

== Publications ==
=== Books ===
- Allard, Francis. Natural ventilation in buildings. A design handbook. (1998). (Cited 796 times, according to Google Scholar.)
- Allard F, Ghiaus C, editors. Natural ventilation in the urban environment: assessment and design. Routledge; 2012 Jun 25. (Cited 165 times, according to Google Scholar.)

== Journal articles ==
- Blondeau P, Iordache V, Poupard O, Genin D, Allard F. Relationship between outdoor and indoor air quality in eight French schools. Indoor air. 2005 Feb 1;15(1):2-12.7)
- Blondeau P, Spérandio M, Allard F. Night ventilation for building cooling in summer. Solar energy. 1997 Nov 1;61(5):327-35.)
- Kurnitski J, Allard F, Braham D, Goeders G, Heiselberg P, Jagemar L, Kosonen R, Lebrun J, Mazzarella L, Railio J, Seppänen O. How to define nearly net zero energy buildings nZEB. Rehva Journal. 2011 May;48(3):6-12.)
- Ghiaus C, Allard F, Santamouris M, Georgakis C, Nicol F. Urban environment influence on natural ventilation potential. Building and environment. 2006 Apr 1;41(4):395-406.)
