= Barzan, Charente-Maritime =

Barzan
- Commune
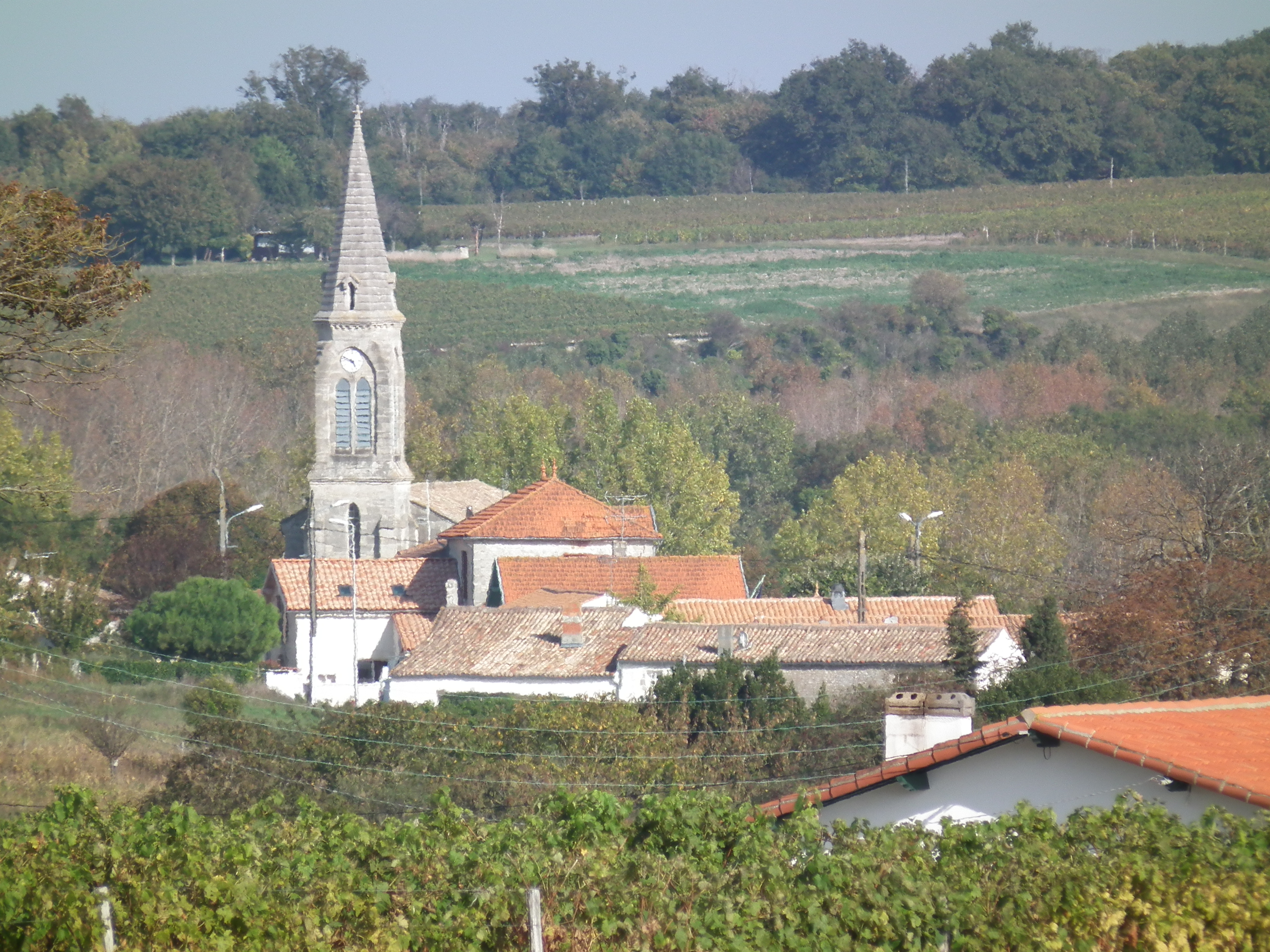
- View of Barzan village
- Location of Barzan
- Location within France Location within Nouvelle-Aquitaine
- Coordinates: 45°31′36″N 0°51′17″W
- Country: France
- Region: Nouvelle-Aquitaine
- Department: Charente-Maritime
- Arrondissement: Saintes
- Canton: Saintonge Estuaire
- Intercommunality: CA Royan Atlantique

Government
  - Mayor (2020–2026): Robert Maigre
- Area^{1}: 8.07 km^{2} (3.12 sq mi)
- Highest elevation: 47 m (154 ft)
- Lowest elevation: 0 m (0 ft)
- Population (2023): 475
  - Density: 58.9/km^{2} (152/sq mi)
- Time zone: UTC+01:00 (CET)
  - Summer (DST): UTC+02:00 (CEST)
- INSEE/Postal code: 17034 /17120
- ^{1} French Land Register data, which excludes lakes, ponds, glaciers > 1 km^{2} (0.386 sq mi or 247 acres) and river estuaries.

Barzan (French pronunciation: [baʁzɑ̃]) is a commune in the Charente-Maritime department in the Nouvelle-Aquitaine region of south-western France.

The inhabitants of the commune are known as Barzanais or Barzanaises.

The commune is the site of a major Gallo-Roman site of Barzan structured excavations carried out since 1994. Aerial photographs and the first archaeological excavations have revealed the presence of a Gallo-Roman port city of great importance (a monumental Gallo-Roman temple, baths, forum, theatre etc.). Other remains are the subject of annual excavations.

It seems almost certain that this Gallo-Roman town is the Novioregum indicated in the Antonine Itinerary. It could also be the Portus Santonum (the port of the Santones) described by Ptolemy.

== Geography ==
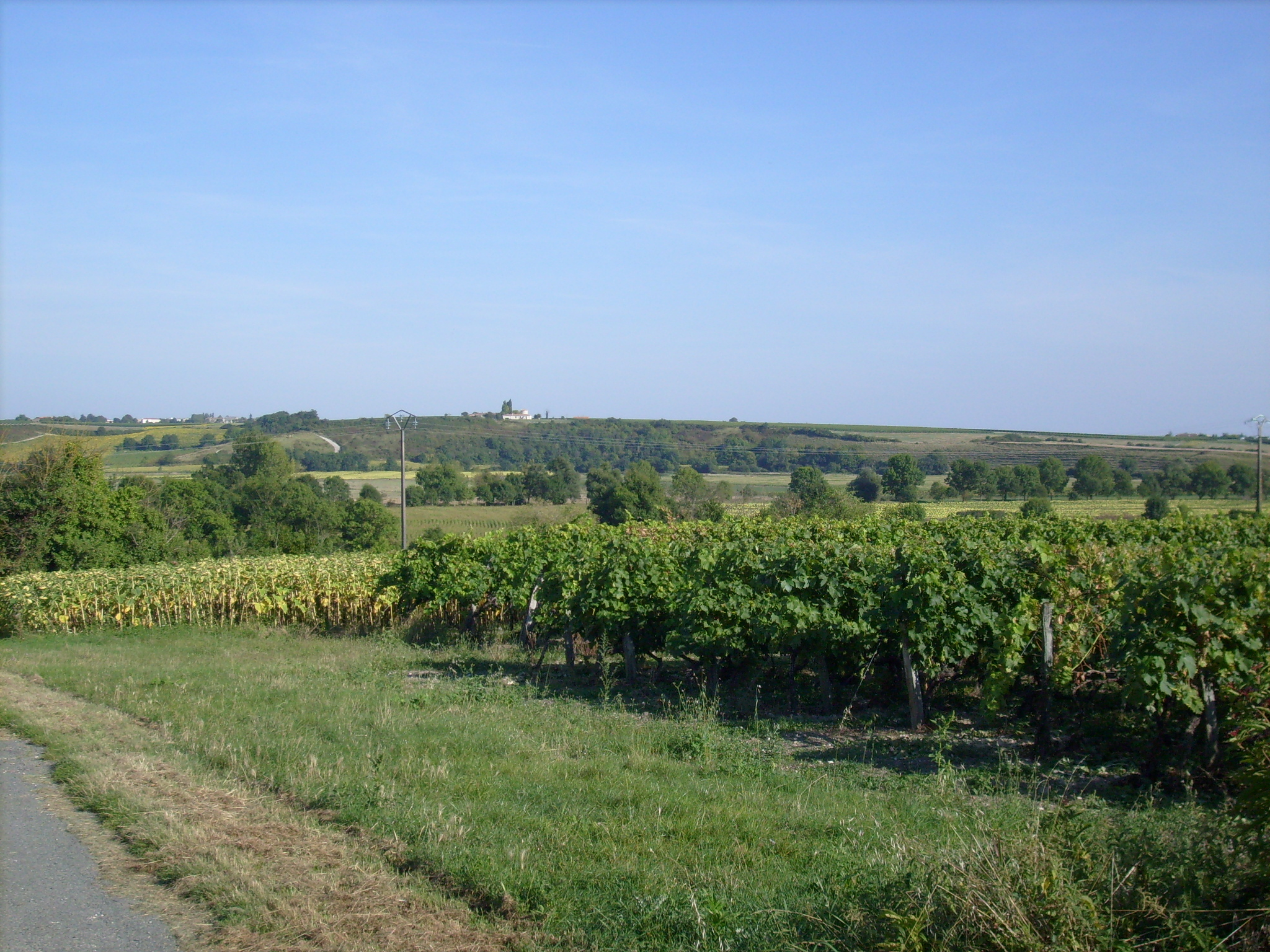
Hilly landscape around Barzan

Barzan is located some 30 km south-west of Saintes and 15 km south-east of Royan in the former province of Saintonge. Access to the commune is by the D145 road from Meschers-sur-Gironde along the coast to the north-west which passes through the commune and continues south-east to Saint-Fort-sur-Gironde. The D114 branches from the D145 near the village and goes north to Arces. Apart from the village there are the hamlets of Barzan Plage, Chez Grenon, Les Monards - a small port, Chez Garnier, Les Grandes Mottes Gachin, and Les Maisons Neuves.

In the south-west the commune borders the Atlantic Ocean where there is a small beach resort built in the 1960s. The Riviere de Chauvignac flows south outside the eastern border to join the Ruisseau de Désir which forms the eastern border of the commune as it flows south to join the Riviere de Chauvignac to form the Monards Channel at Les Monards which connects to the sea.

=== Geology and Relief ===
The commune is located in the heart of a region of limestone hills overlooking the Gironde estuary. The Littoral zone extends from the Bay of Chant-Dorat, west of the commune, to the Monards Channel in the south, consists essentially of an alternation of muddy intertidal zones and Limestone cliffs which are relatively eroded and are termed dead zones in the southern part of the commune. This term is explained by the gradual retreat of the shoreline and the partial silting of the estuary at this point leaving the cliffs, once battered by the waves, several hundred metres from the waters of the estuary, in the middle of the swampy areas. This type of landscape, found mostly near Mortagne-sur-Gironde, marks the beginning of what is sometimes called the Charente Camargue. In the north-west the Caillaud cliffs mark the border with the commune of Talmont-sur-Gironde.

=== Vegetation ===
The commune is sparsely wooded but has a forest covering the valley of Font Vielle.

The landscape is strongly marked by the cultivation of cereals, - especially wheat and maize - as well as vineyards: the vines that cover the hillsides are used particularly in the production of cognac (the town is classified as "Bons Bois") and for the production of Charentais Wine (called Talmonais).

== Toponymy ==
The name Barzan comes from the Latin Barisiacum from the Gallo-Roman anthroponym Barisii with the Gallo-Roman suffix -acum indicating ownership transformed into the Latin suffix -anum. In the Middle Ages the village was called Barlan then Balzan. When the village became a commune the name Barzan was used.

Barzan appears as Barzan on the 1750 Cassini Map and the same on the 1790 version.

== History ==
=== A prehistoric settlement ===
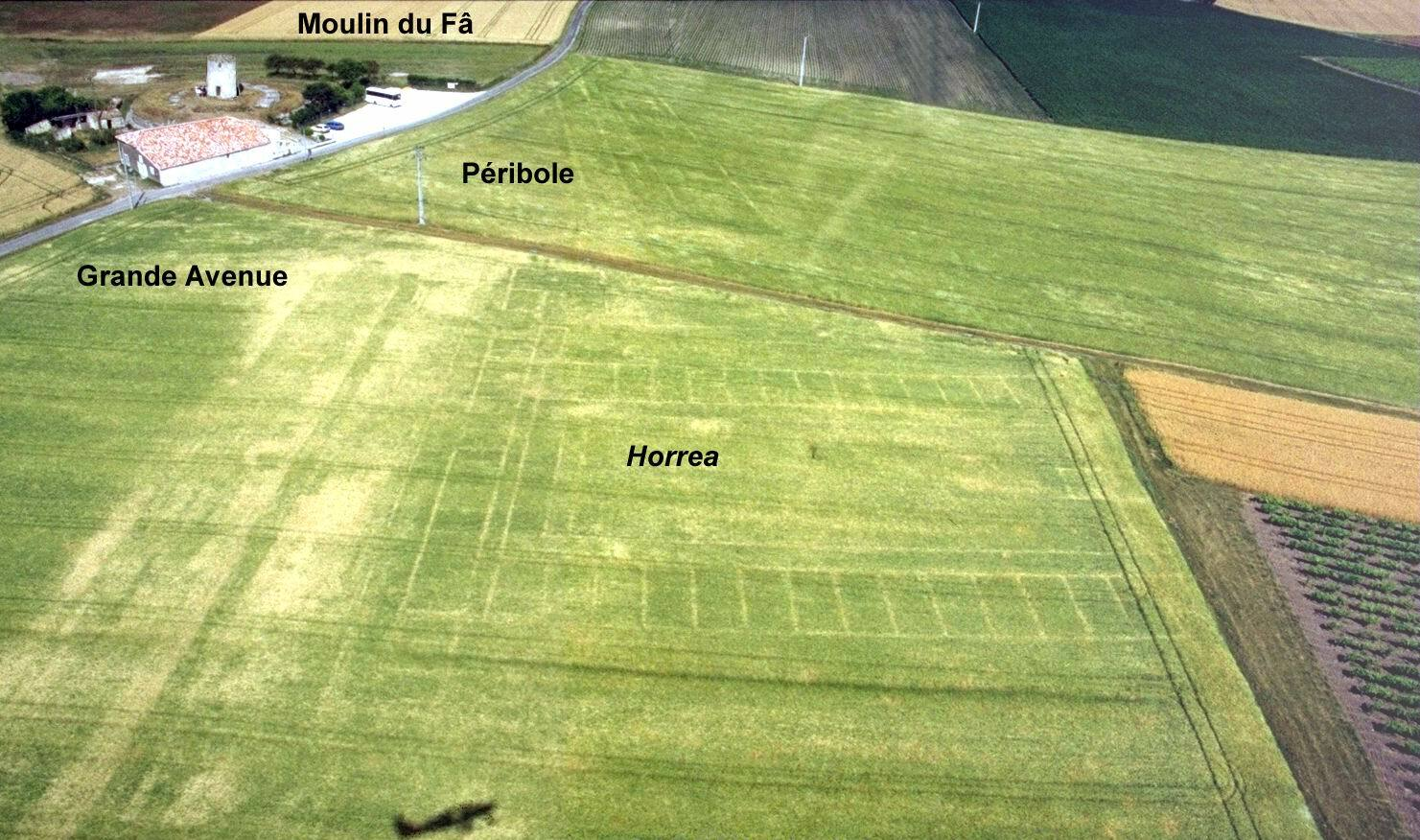
Aerial view of the Fâ site

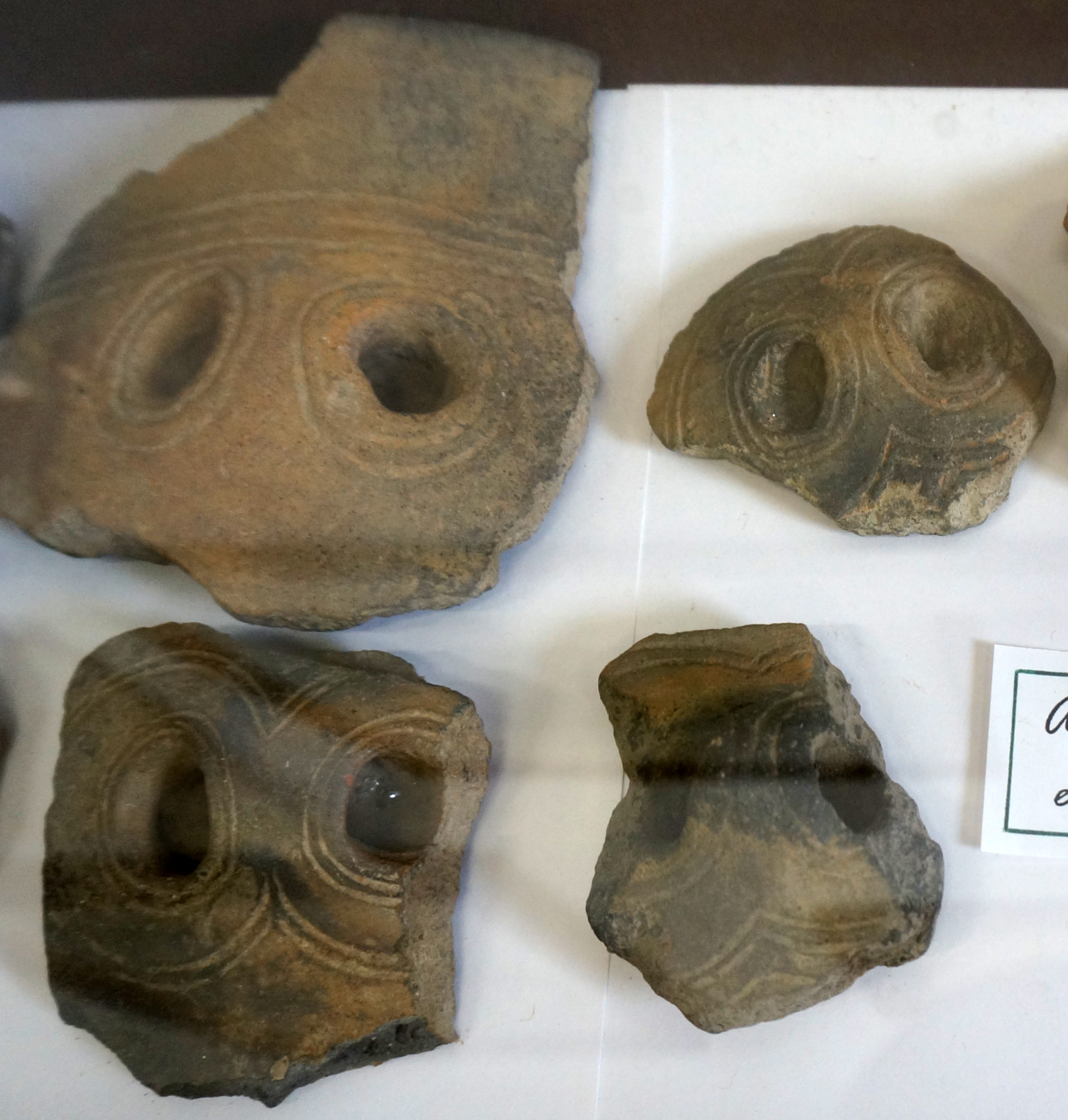
Characteristic Peu-Richard ceramics

The commune was inhabited very early, at least from Neolithic times, which is evidenced by the discovery of numerous traces in various parts of the commune especially near the hill of La Garde which overlooks the Gironde estuary. In 1877 Eutrope Jouan, a local historian, reported the uncovering of fragments of polished axes and arrowheads. This discovery would be confirmed almost a century later, in 1970, by remnants of ceramics attributed to the Matignons and the Peu-Richardiens. Layers of ash and stone fireplaces were found nearby and the presence of a cemetery a few metres from the site showed proof of the presence of a habitat there in about 3500 years BC.

In 1975 an aerial survey by Jacques Dassié confirmed the discoveries and also showed the presence of fortifications around the camp: these being mainly composed of ditches and chicane type entrances, an ingenious device dangerously exposing any potential attackers. Two other more recent prehistoric sites have been discovered in the commune dating from the Bronze Age: one near the Fa mill and one on the north-east side of the La Garde hill near the Piloquets locality. The latter was discovered in 1980 during vine planting when it was revealed including several bronze axes dated about 1800 BC which are currently on display at the Museum of Royan.

=== A Celtic town ===
Around the 7th century BC Saintonge was inhabited by people of Celtic origin: the Santones. They first established their capital at Pons, then Saintes. The Santones settled at Fâ and built their main sanctuary on a hill overlooking the Gironde estuary. They founded the town which was the embryo of the Roman city which emerged at this place a few centuries later. Recent aerial surveys have also revealed traces of two other Celtic temples located on the La Garde hill.

An excavation undertaken under the direction of Karine Robin from 1996 to 2002 also helped to uncover Gallic and Hispanic ceramics dating from the 5th century BC which indicates the presence of a port at this time. The fact that Saintonge was located on one of the routes for the tin trade, a particularly active trade between the British Isles (mainly Cornwall) and the Mediterranean Sea at that time, suggests the possibility of the transit of this essential raw material for the manufacture of bronze through the port of this ancient city and explains the relative prosperity of the city even before the establishment of the Roman domination.

=== The golden age of the city ===
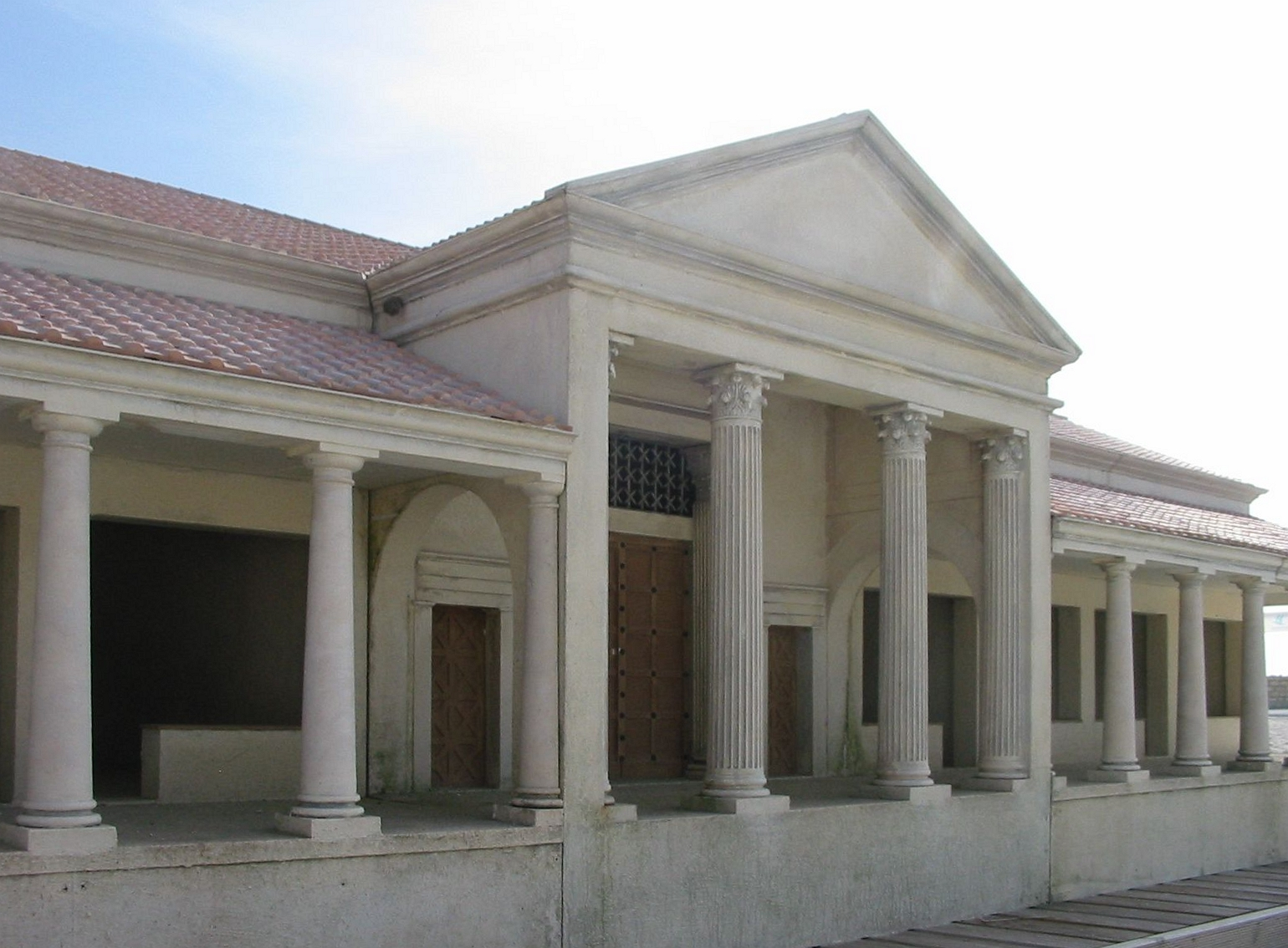
A model of the ancient baths

The province of the Santons was invaded by the Romans in 58 BC. This was the beginning of a golden age for its capital, Mediolanum Santonum (Saintes) which became the first capital of the Roman province of Gallia Aquitania. The city of Novioregum was then primarily an Emporium or a trading post, which is easily explained by its geographical location not far from the mouth of the Gironde. The first important buildings were probably built under the Flavians (from 69 to 96), as evidenced by remnants of statues and several Corinthian Capitals dating from this period.

Nevertheless, the city seems to have reached its peak in the 2nd century during the reigns of Antoninus Pius and Marcus Aurelius. The city was adorned with important monuments: theatre, avenues, and port warehouses. The thermal baths were enlarged. The prosperous city was indicated in the Antonine Itinerary published in the 3rd century AD, during the reign of Emperor Diocletian. This veritable "Travelers Guide" before its time located Novioregum on the main road leading from Saintes to Bordeaux via Blaye, 15 leuga from Saintes (about 35 km) and 12 leuga from Tamnum, a city probably located near Consac (about 29 km). The city was abandoned around the 4th or 5th century without anyone really knowing why. The port silting theory has been considered but no real evidence is established at present. This common phenomenon in the region caused the loss of another major port in the region - Brouage - in the 17th century.

=== A farming village ===
At the beginning of the Middle Ages the ancient Roman city had become a stone quarry. Decorative elements were reused in homes and churches in the region, and Roman columns were long used as curbstones surrounding village wells. The village became a modest parish dependent on the castellanies of Theon, Conteneuil or Uzet. A Romanesque church was built in the 12th century but was poorly maintained and was demolished in the 19th century. The economy of the village, growing cereal crops, explains the presence of several mills. In the 18th century vineyards became predominant but the ravages of phylloxera a century later put a stop to this activity although it is still important today.

=== Intriguing Ruins ===
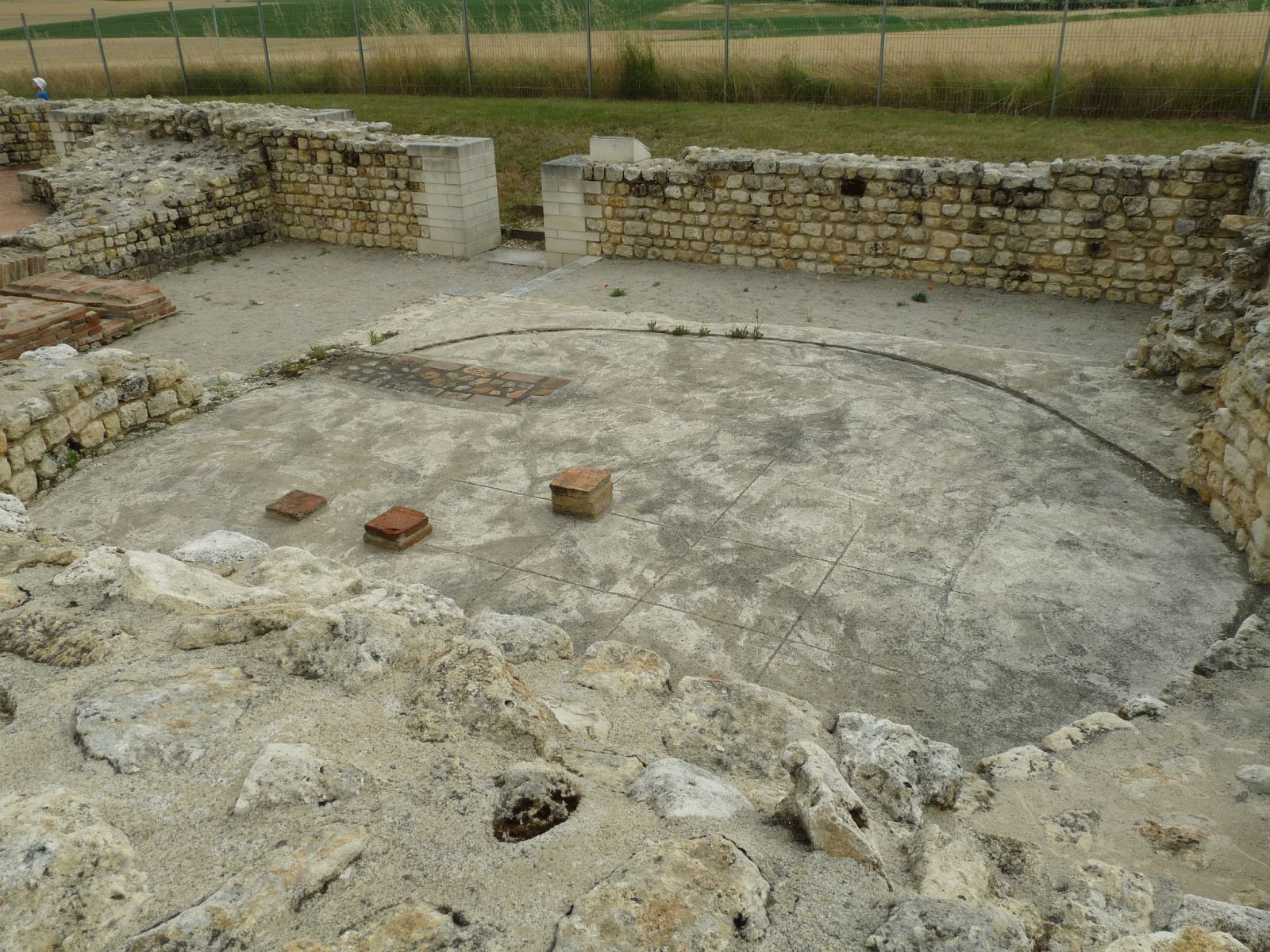
Remains of a sudarium, one of the bath rooms similar to a modern sauna

The ruins scattered around Barzan have intrigued scholars for a long time: in 1715, Claude Masse, an engineer and geographer for the King, responsible for the provinces of Aunis and Saintonge had already noticed their presence when travelling. From 1921 many archaeological excavations were made on the Fâ site. Between 1921 and 1926 Leon Massiou, a local scholar and author of several books on history, conducted excavations at Fâ on the site of the mill resulting in the classification of the temple as an historical monument in 1937. From 1935 to 1957, Louis Basalo also conducted searches and explored an aqueduct in the north of the commune and excavated the baths. It was in 1975 that, due to a major drought, that Jacques Dassié took aerial photographs unveiling a more important site than was previously suspected. Under the crops and vegetation there was nothing less than 140 hectares of a city with temples, baths, theatres, warehouses, forum, houses, and avenues.

In 1994 the Ministry of Culture entrusted Peter Aupert, research director at CNRS, with the excavation of the sanctuary of the Fâ. They proved in particular the construction of two successive temples, the existence of a vast pit - perhaps sacrificial, and marks of the construction of a podium. In 1999 positive surveys were conducted by Laurence Tranoy at a place called le Trésor on the site of what is assumed to have been the forum at the crossroads of the Cardo and Decumanus Maximus.

From 1998 to 2004 the excavations of Thermae north of Fâ were led by Alain Bouet, HDR Docent at the University of Bordeaux and specialist in the Gallo-Roman era. He soon revealed the existence of one of the largest ruins known in Gaul to date. Since 2005 the site of the baths has been open to the public.

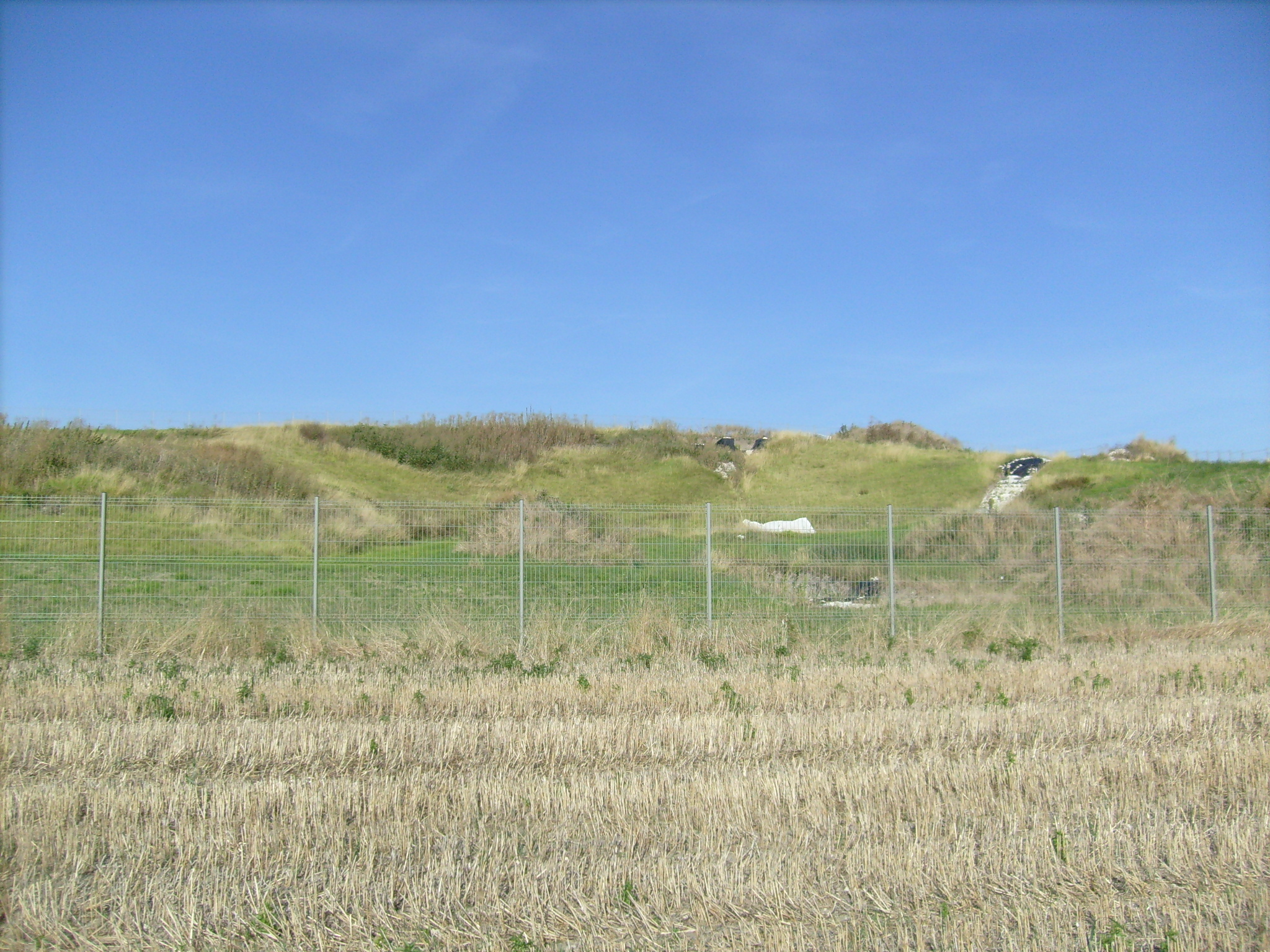
The remains of the Gallo-Roman theatre

From 2003 to 2005 Alain Bouet also participated in excavations of the warehouses (the horrea) just south of the Fâ sanctuary revealing large stores of great importance to the ancient port. A series of excavations conducted between 2006 and 2008 at Fa also revealed the peribolos walls showing both successive Compounds, the second huge compound measured approximately 106 m X 92 m.

Restarted in 2007 by Antoine Nadeau, the excavations of the theatre at La Garde, resumed again in 2009. Highly degraded, the ruins were used as a stone quarry for centuries.

As for the Grand Avenue revealed by aerial photographs of Jacques Dassié it is being studied in the context of current excavations, conducted under the direction of Laurence Tranoy (University of La Rochelle) and Emmanuel Moizan (INRAP), which aim to understand the flow of the ancient city. The two archaeologists explained their research in a report devoted to one of these excavations in 2008.

== Administration ==
=== Municipal Administration ===
From 1789 to 1799, under the Law of 14 December 1789, municipal officials (mayors) were directly elected for 2 years and re-elected by the active citizens of the town aged at least 25 years and paying contribution of at least 3 working days to the commune. Those eligible had to pay a tax equivalent to at least ten working days.

From 1799 to 1848, under the Constitution of 22 Frimaire Year VIII (13 December 1799) regarding the election of the mayor, mayors were appointed by the prefect for communes with fewer than 5000 inhabitants. The Restoration established the appointment of mayors and municipal councilors. After the organic laws in 1831 mayors were appointed (by the king for communes with more than 3000 inhabitants, the prefect for the smaller ones), but councillors were elected by suffrage for six years.

From 3 July 1848 to 1851 mayors were elected by the municipal council for communes with less than 6000 inhabitants.

From 1851 to 1871 mayors were appointed by the prefect for communes with less than 3000 inhabitants for 5 years from 1855. After 1871 mayors were elected again except in the capitals (departments, boroughs or districts).

Only on 28 March 1882, a law on municipal organization (still in force) was passed which regulates the principle of election of the mayor and deputy by the city council, whatever the size of the commune (except for Paris). The law of 5 April 1884 fixed the mandate to four years, changed to six years on 10 April 1929.

List of Successive Mayors

From	To	Name
2005	2026	Robert Maigre

=== Canton ===
The commune belongs to the Canton of Saintonge Estuaire. Until 1802 it belonged to the ephemeral Canton of Mortagne-sur-Gironde, then the Canton of Cozes until March 2015.

=== Intercommunality ===
Barzan is one of 34 communes of the Agglomeration Community of Royan Atlantique.

== Demography ==
Historical population

Year	Pop.	±% p.a.
1793	375	—
1821	611	+1.76%
1846	649	+0.24%
1872	554	−0.61%
1901	527	−0.17%
1926	401	−1.09%
1946	388	−0.16%
1962	431	+0.66%
1968	378	−2.16%

Year	Pop.	±% p.a.
1975	344	−1.34%
1982	371	+1.09%
1990	410	+1.26%
1999	428	+0.48%
2007	451	+0.66%
2012	467	+0.70%
2017	470	+0.13%
2023	475	+0.18%

Source: EHESS and INSEE

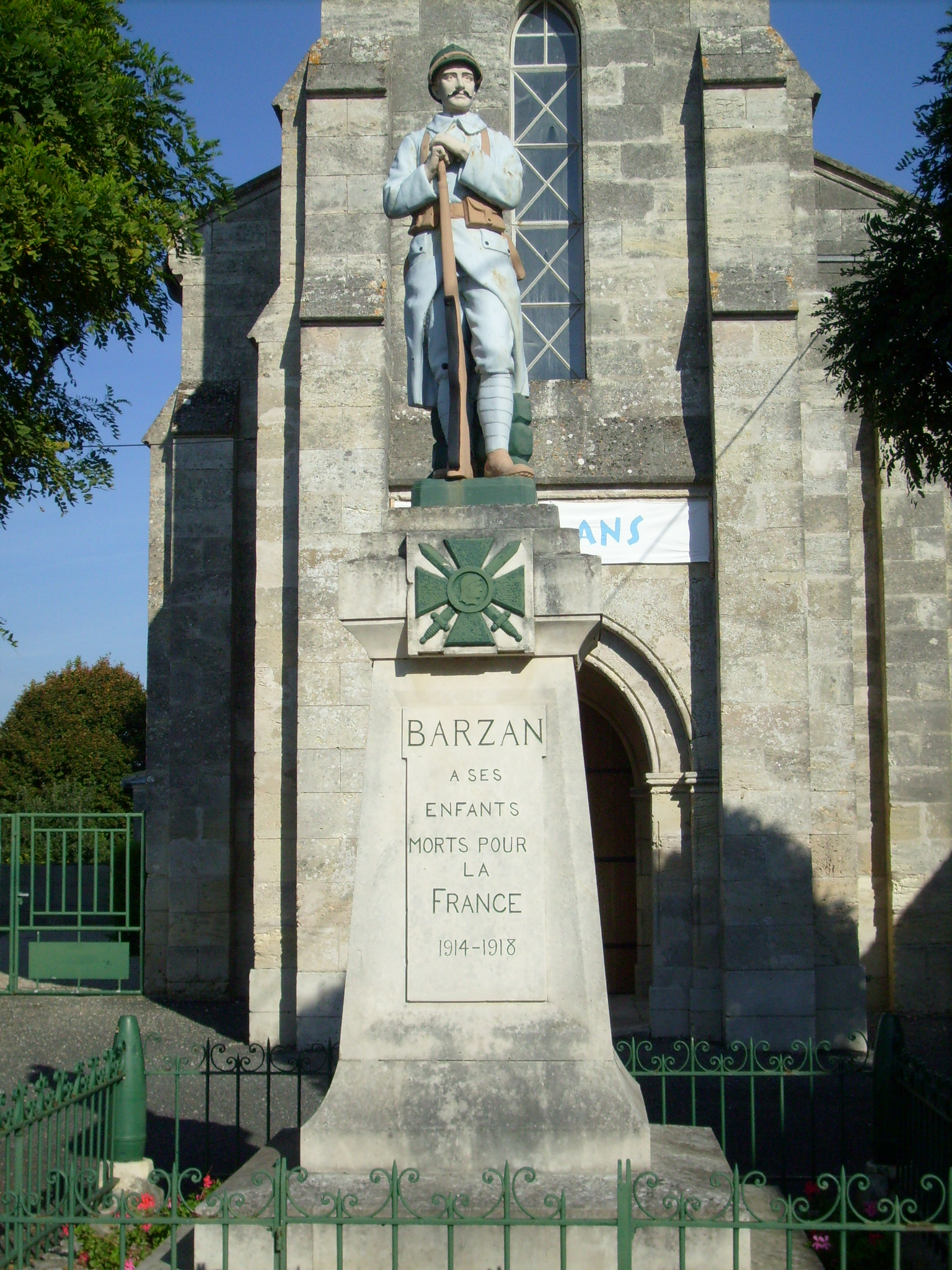
The War Memorial

== Economy ==
The town is in the heart of a particularly large labour pool: the employment area of Royan (the result of the partition of the old Saintonge maritime employment area which included many communes of Pays Rochefortais, Pays Marennes-Oléron, and Pays Royannais) consisting of 27,753 employees in 2008. The Royan employment area is, with that of La Rochelle, the most dynamic in the Poitou-Charentes region with both taking advantage of an "economic fabric and a dynamic demography"(INSEE). Growth is particularly strong because of the development of tertiary activities.

The economy of the commune is still dominated by agriculture and viticulture even though tourism is growing rapidly due to the presence of the Gallo-Roman site of Novioregum. This gradual development originates from an archeological museum with displays of remains from the site as well as models to represent the city in Roman times.

The active population is 166, of which 34 (20.5%) unemployed. The participation rate of persons between 15 and 64 years amounted to 57.4%, which is below the national average of 63.7%. The rate of retired people is higher than the national figures, 14.3% to 6.7%. School students are 4.8%, against 10.6% on average in the rest of the country.

The average income per household are higher than the national figures. They are €19,932 per year against €15,027 per year. The rate of people who own their homes is higher than the national average at 81.3% against 55.3%.

== Culture and heritage ==
=== Gallo-Roman site of Fâ ===
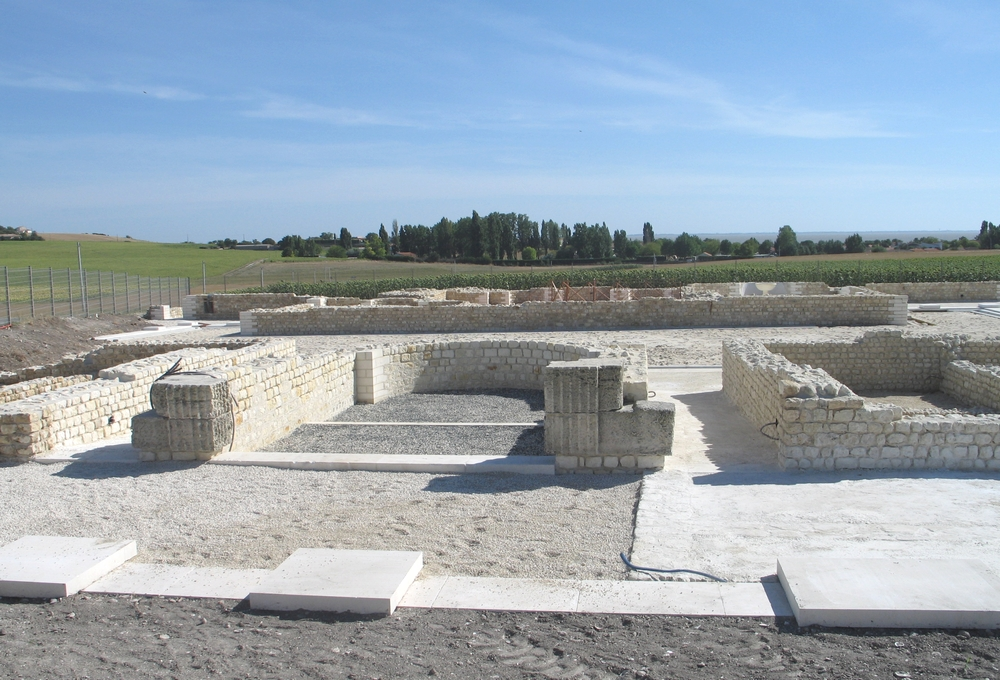
The Roman baths

The name of this site derives from fanum meaning "temple" and has been known since the 18th century from the work of Claude Masse, but its magnitude was not revealed until 1975 in the aerial surveys by Jacques Dassié.

The urban area of the Roman town covers 40 hectares. There are the remains of a Gallo-Roman port city including temples, main street, warehouses, thermal baths, Port etc.

The site was at first privately owned but was purchased by the municipality in 1993. An association was created (ASSA Barzan) and in December of that year it was decided to open the site to the public.

Excavations have been ongoing since 1995, mainly by the Bordeaux Montaigne University and the University of La Rochelle. A joint union (commune and department) was formed for the acquisition of the classified area and for its development, both of the scientific and touristic sites, managed by the ASSA.

The site is registered as an historical monument.

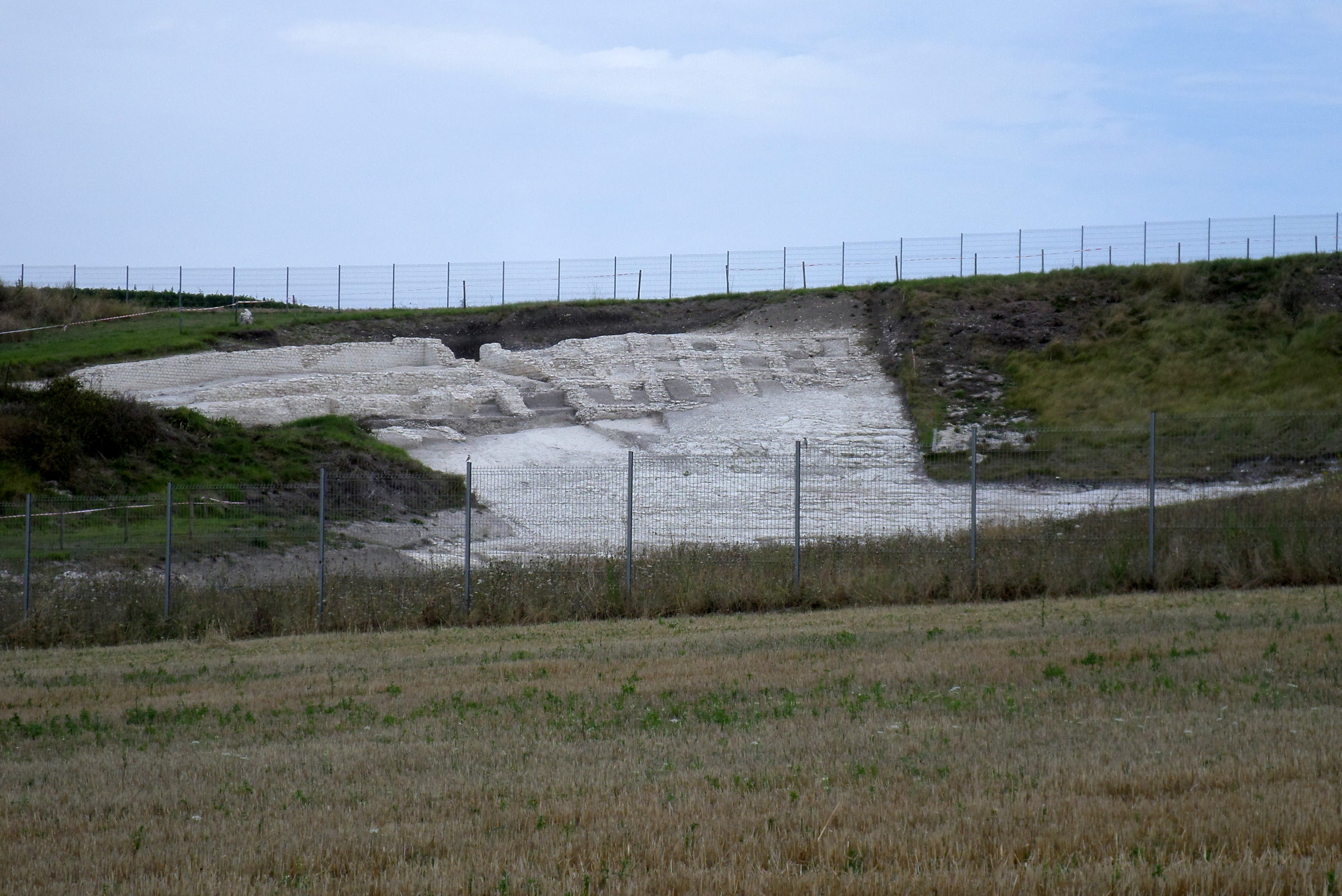
The Gallo-Roman Theatre

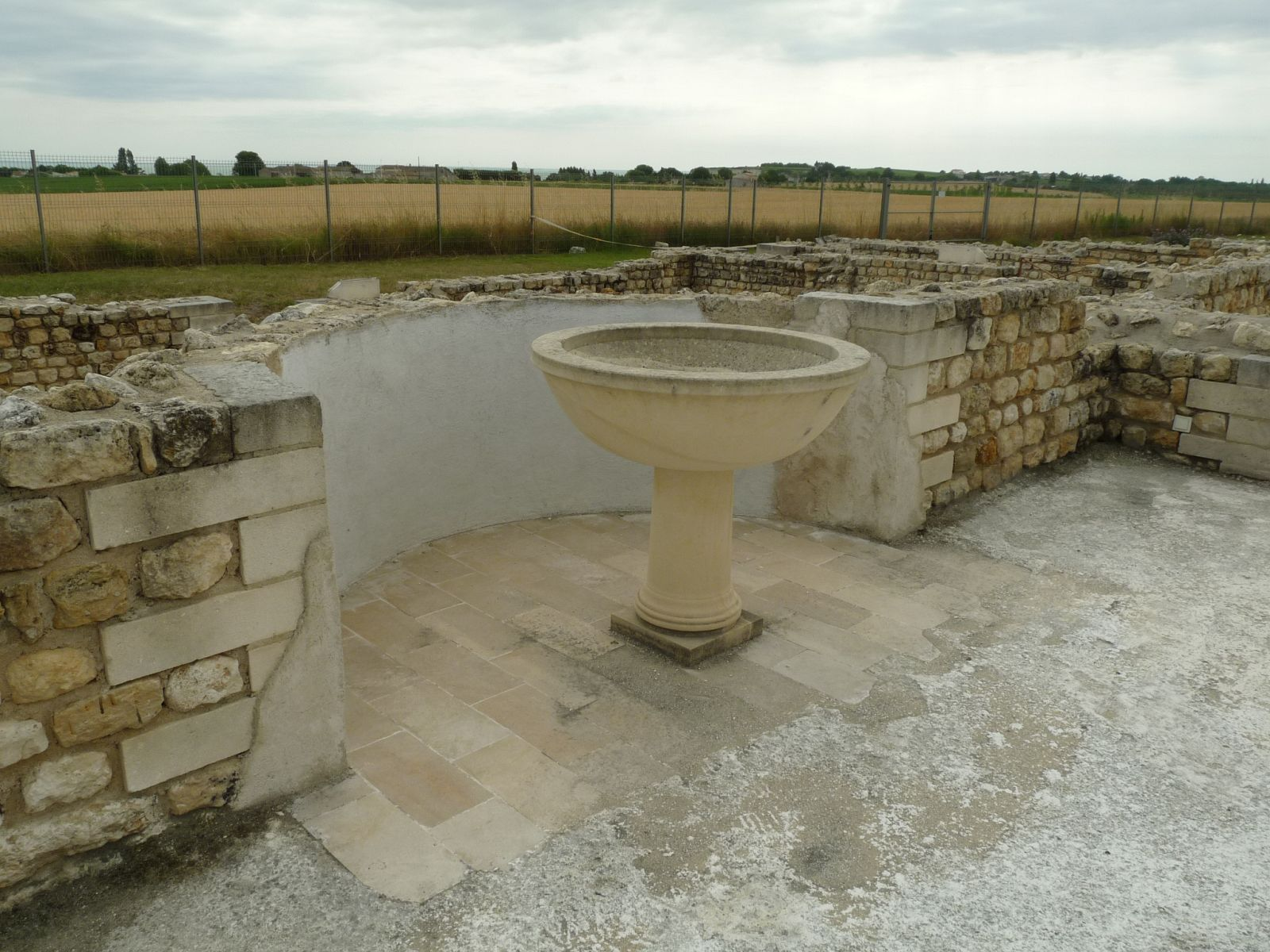

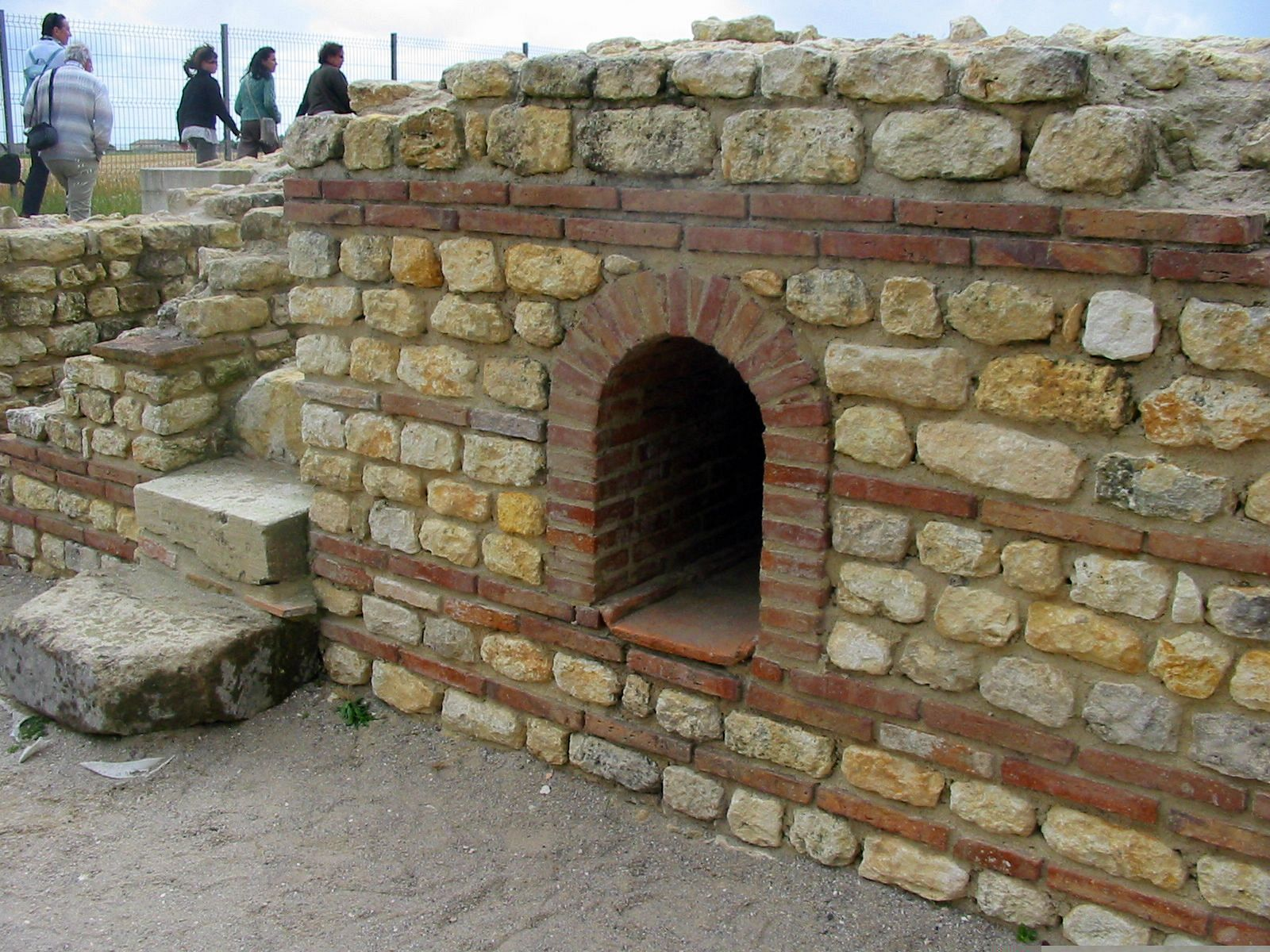

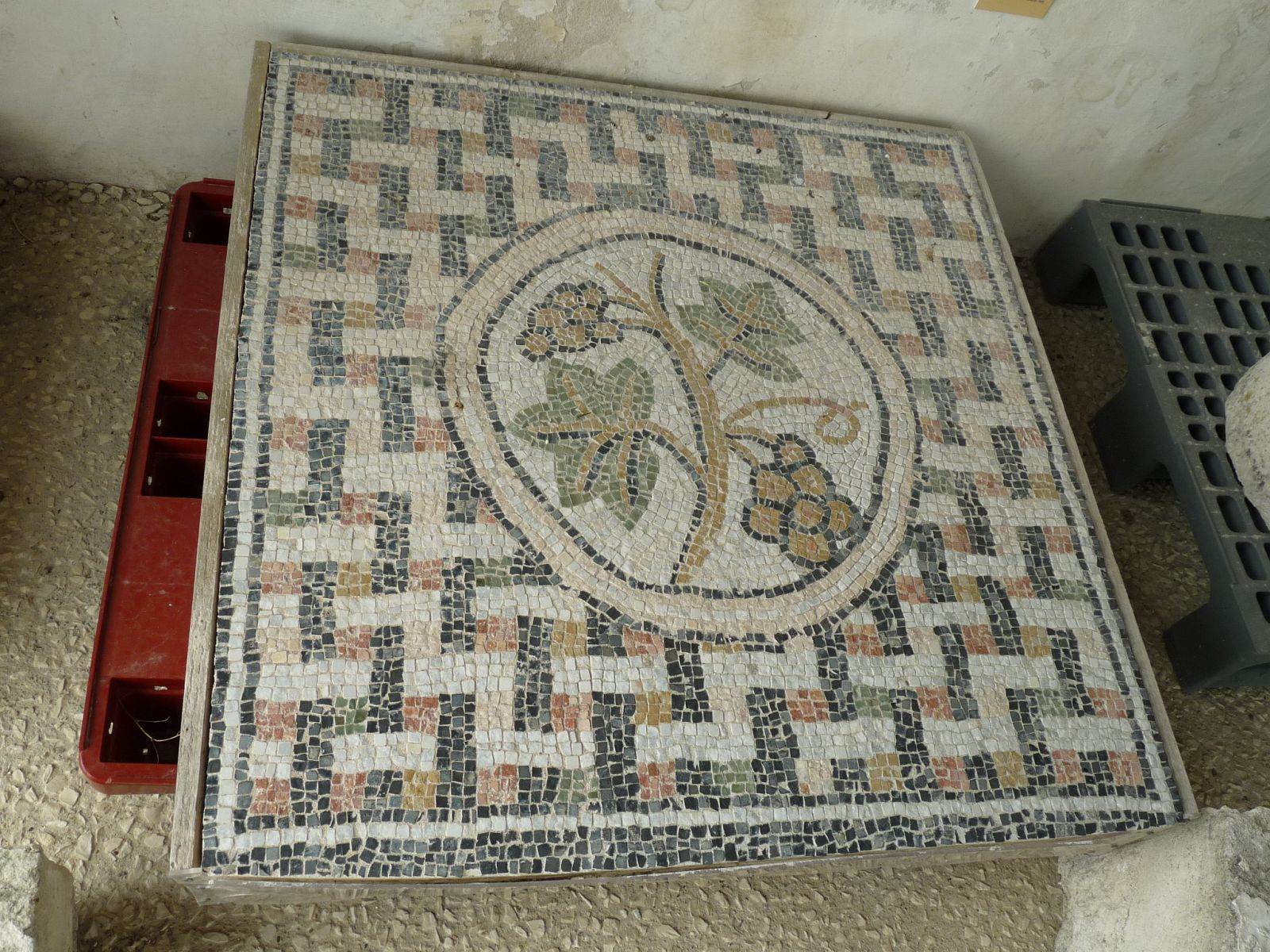

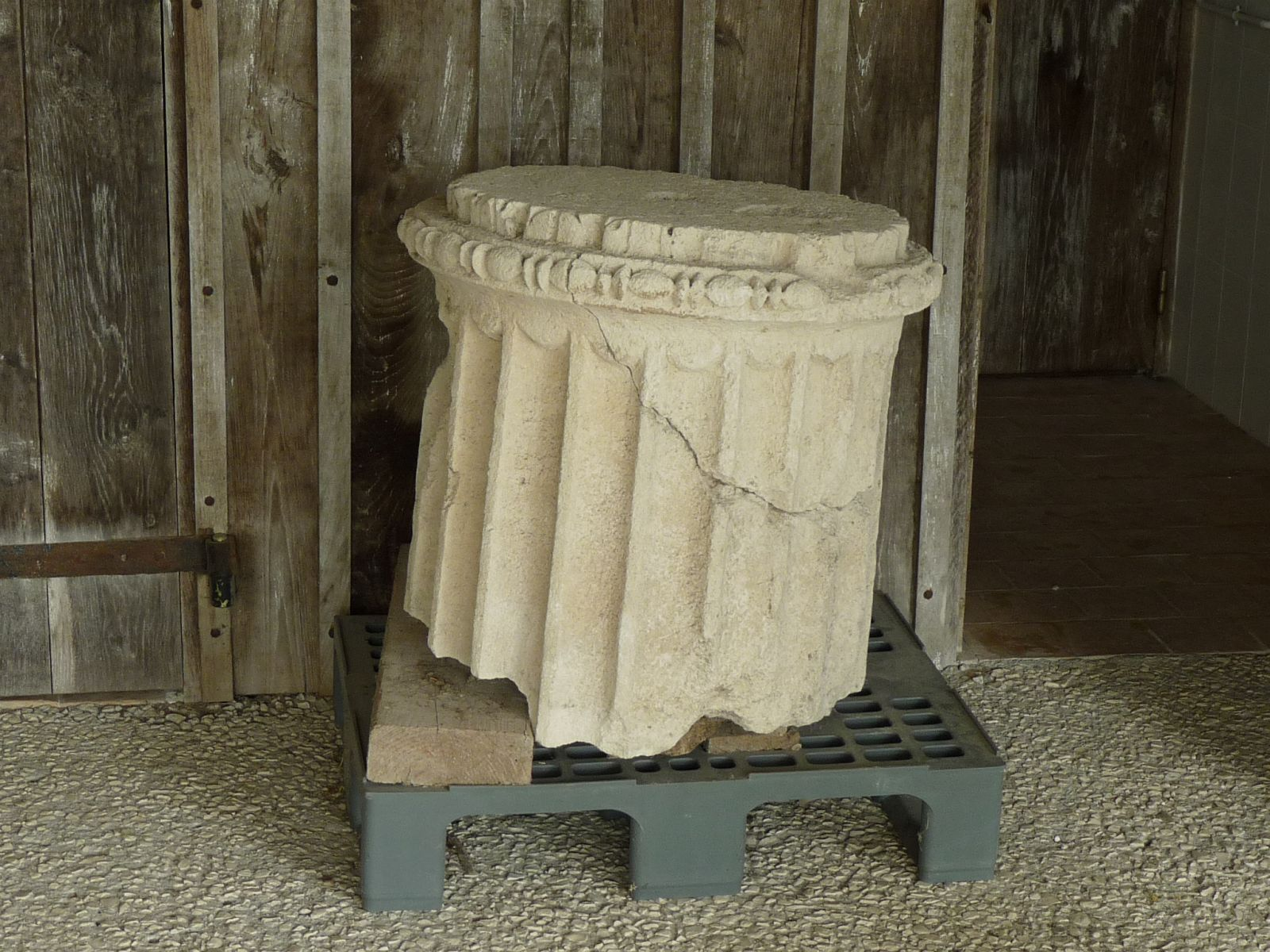

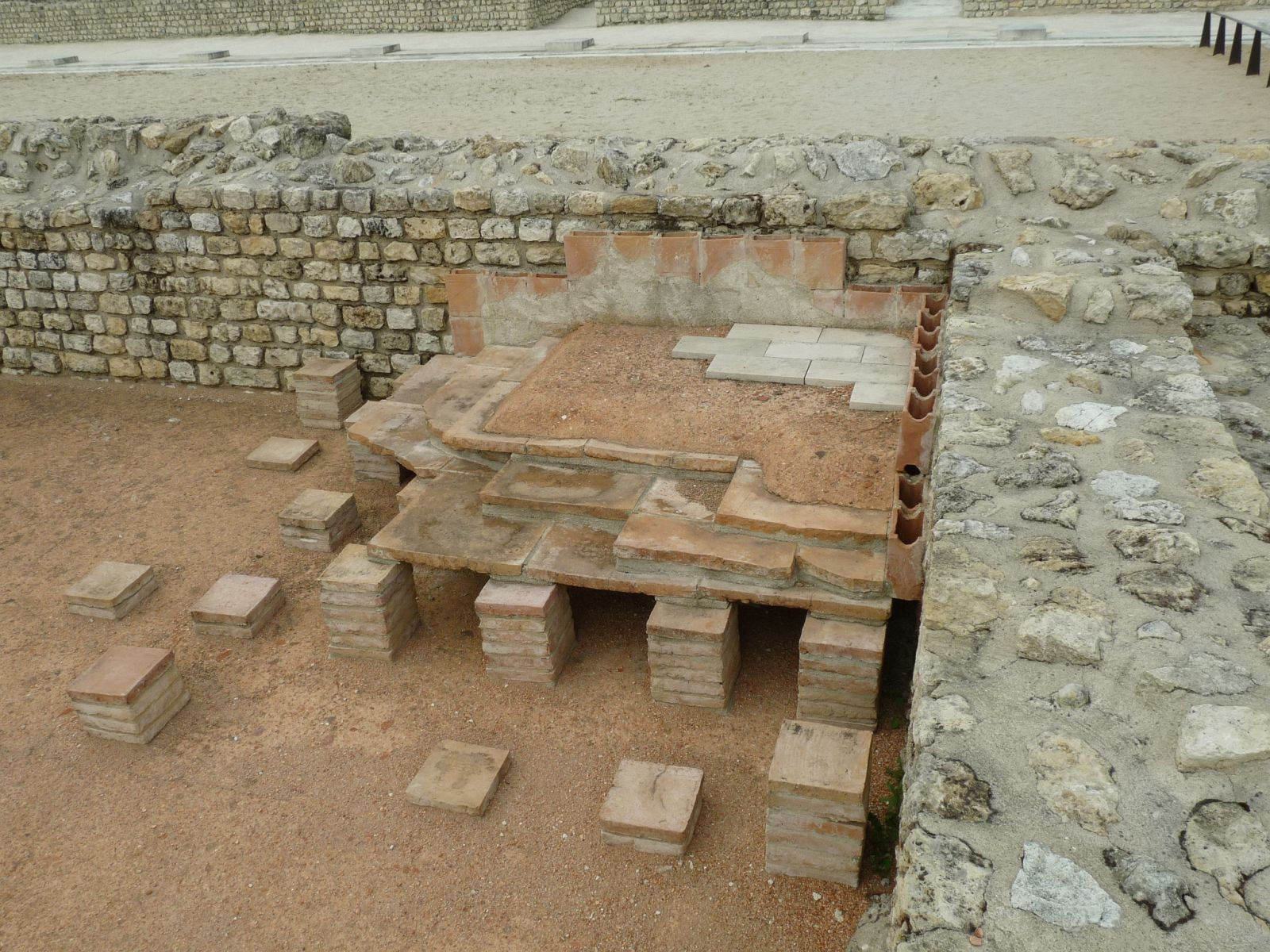
The baths

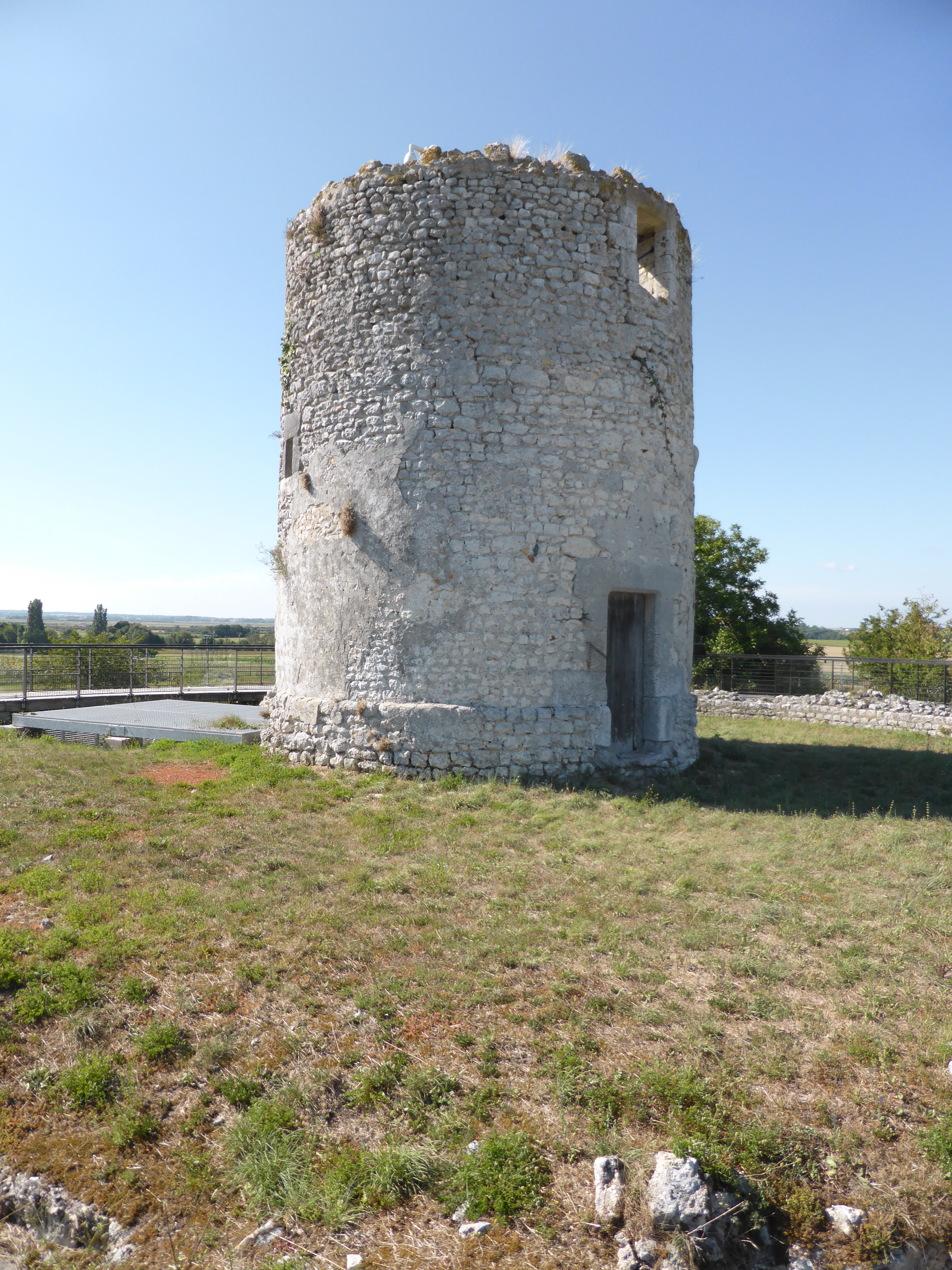

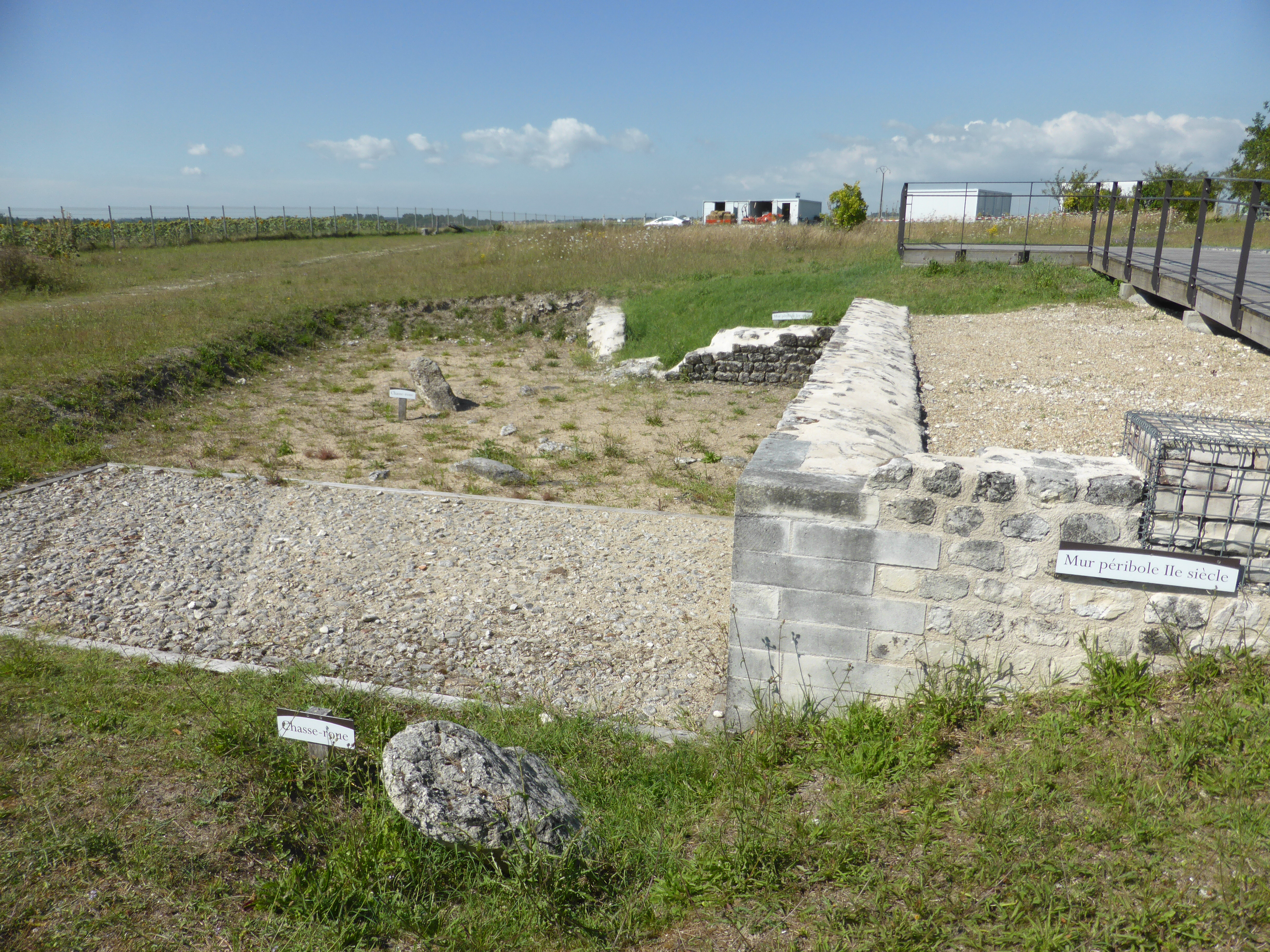
The peribolos

=== Church of Saint Peter ===
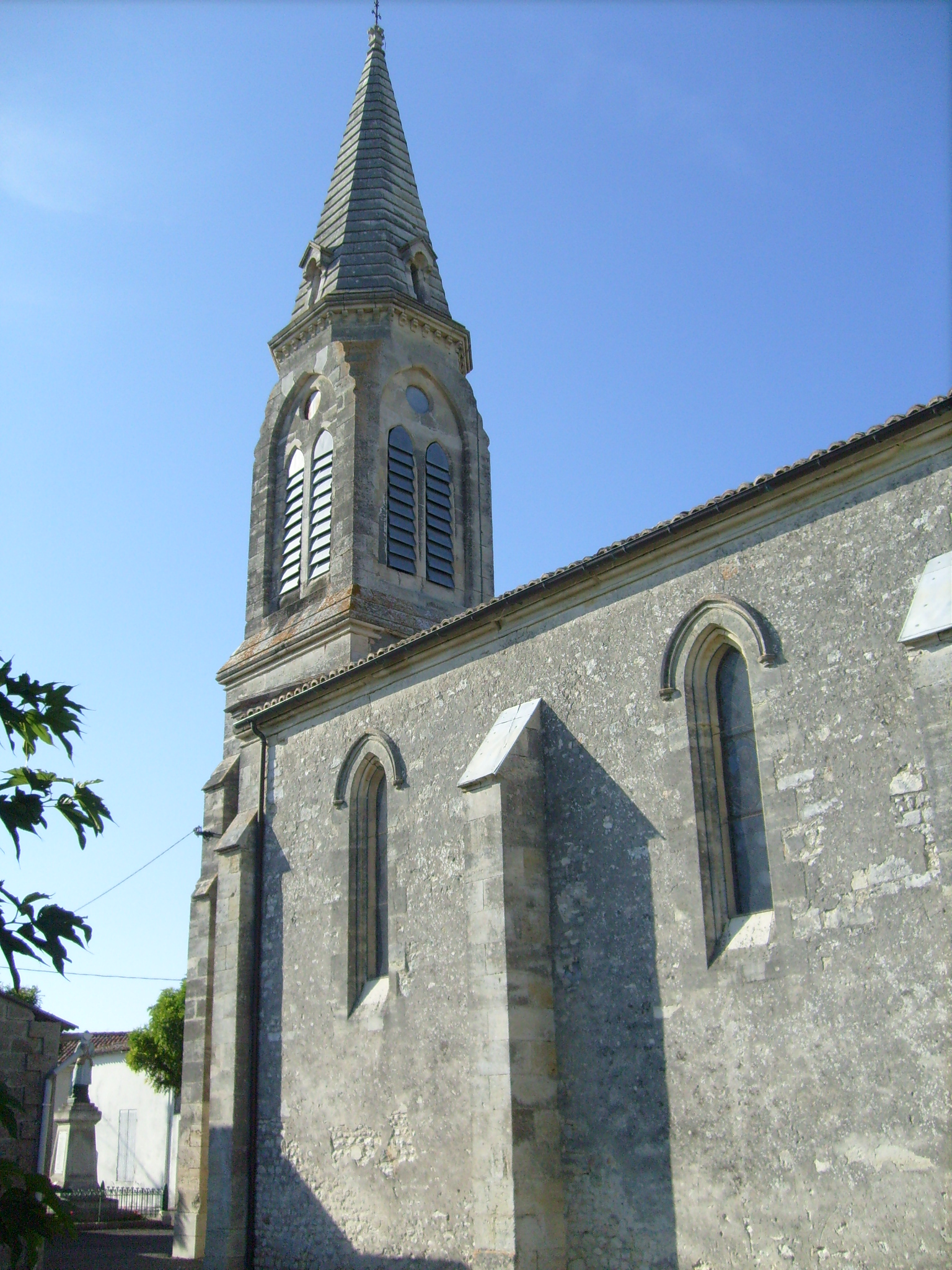
The Church of Saint Peter

This church was built between 1875 and 1879 to replace an old church dating back to the 12th century which was altered in the 17th century. The municipal council voted to demolish it because of its dilapidation. During the demolition of the building of sarcophagi with saddleback lids were unearthed. Dating back to the Middle Ages, two iron dagger blades and fragments of vases mixed with bones were found there.

A new sanctuary was built to the design of the architect Gustave Alaux who had already worked on the construction of several churches in the Bordeaux region including the church of Mortagne-sur-Gironde a few kilometres from the commune.

This building was in the Gothic Revival style and incorporated a Latin cross plan consisting of a single nave with three bays, with a ribbed vault lit by six large lancet windows decorated with stained glass executed by the master glassmaker E. Lagrange. Six stone buttresses support the nave.

A transept and apse frame the shrine which was consecrated in 1879. The bell tower and porch has three levels and is topped with an octagonal stone arrow overlooking the town.

The Church contains an ex-voto (19th century) which is registered as an historical object.

=== Obelisk of La Garde ===
This monument, located atop the hill at La Guard, was built in the 19th century to serve as a maritime Landmark. Situated among vineyards, it forms a kind of obelisk of hewn stone measuring about 5 metres high.

=== The Town hall and former school ===
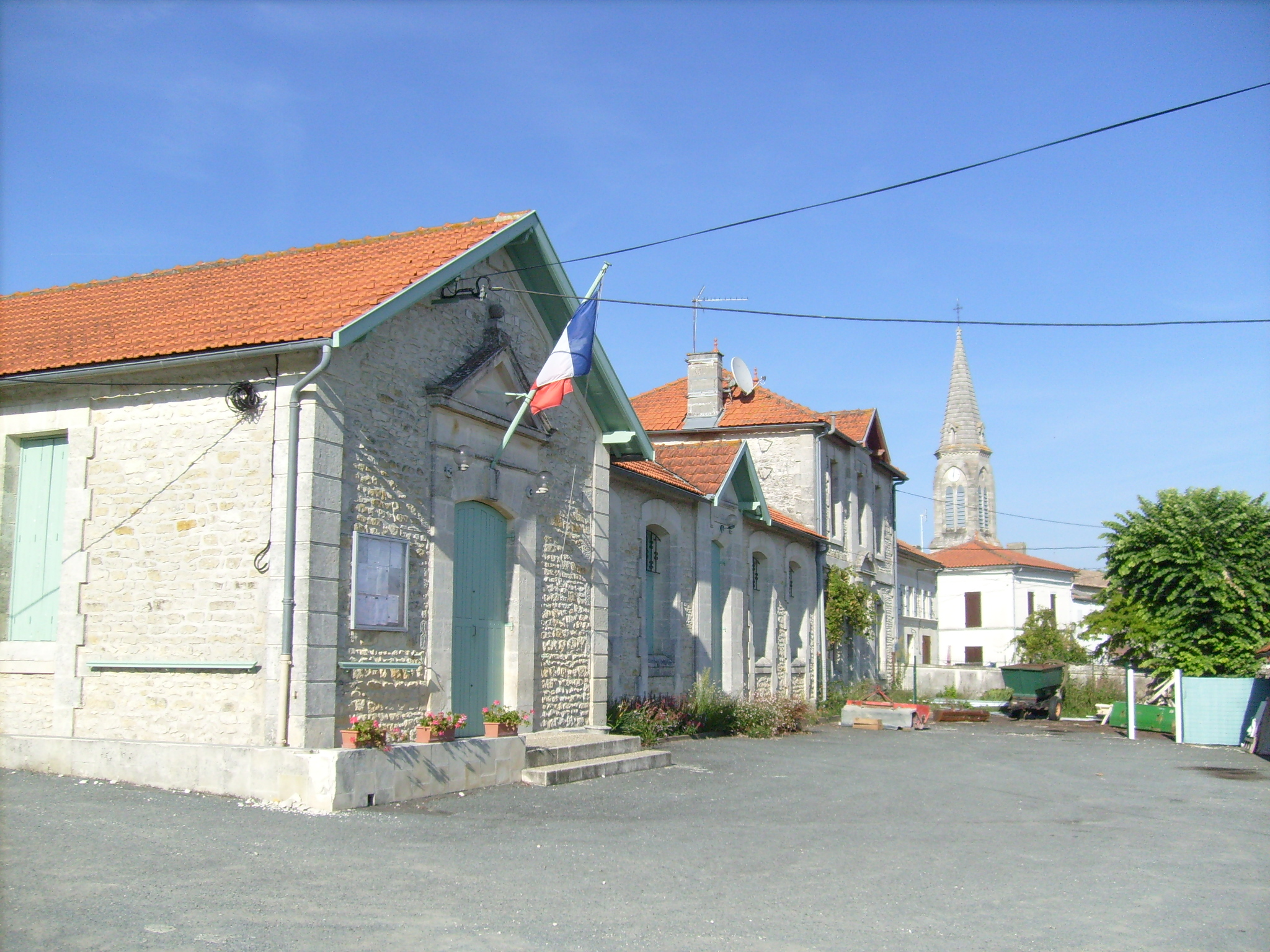
The Town Hall and former school

At the beginning of the 19th century, in rural communes the town hall and communal school were often located in the same building. At Barzan works, directed by architect Georges Naud Saintais who was very active in the Canton, were carried out in two stages: a first stage between 1904 and 1906 followed by a building expansion between 1907 and 1908 in order to provide housing for the teacher.

This simple single-storey building consists of a main building with five bays covered with Roman tiles and a pavilion with projections from the same material.

=== War memorial ===
This memorial was built in 1922 in the Church Square. It is in the form of a polychrome statue in cast iron 1.6 metres tall representing a soldier with grounded arms.

The monument was ordered from a company located in Jeumont (Nord) and mounted on a pedestal erected by a local contractor.

=== The Port of Monards ===
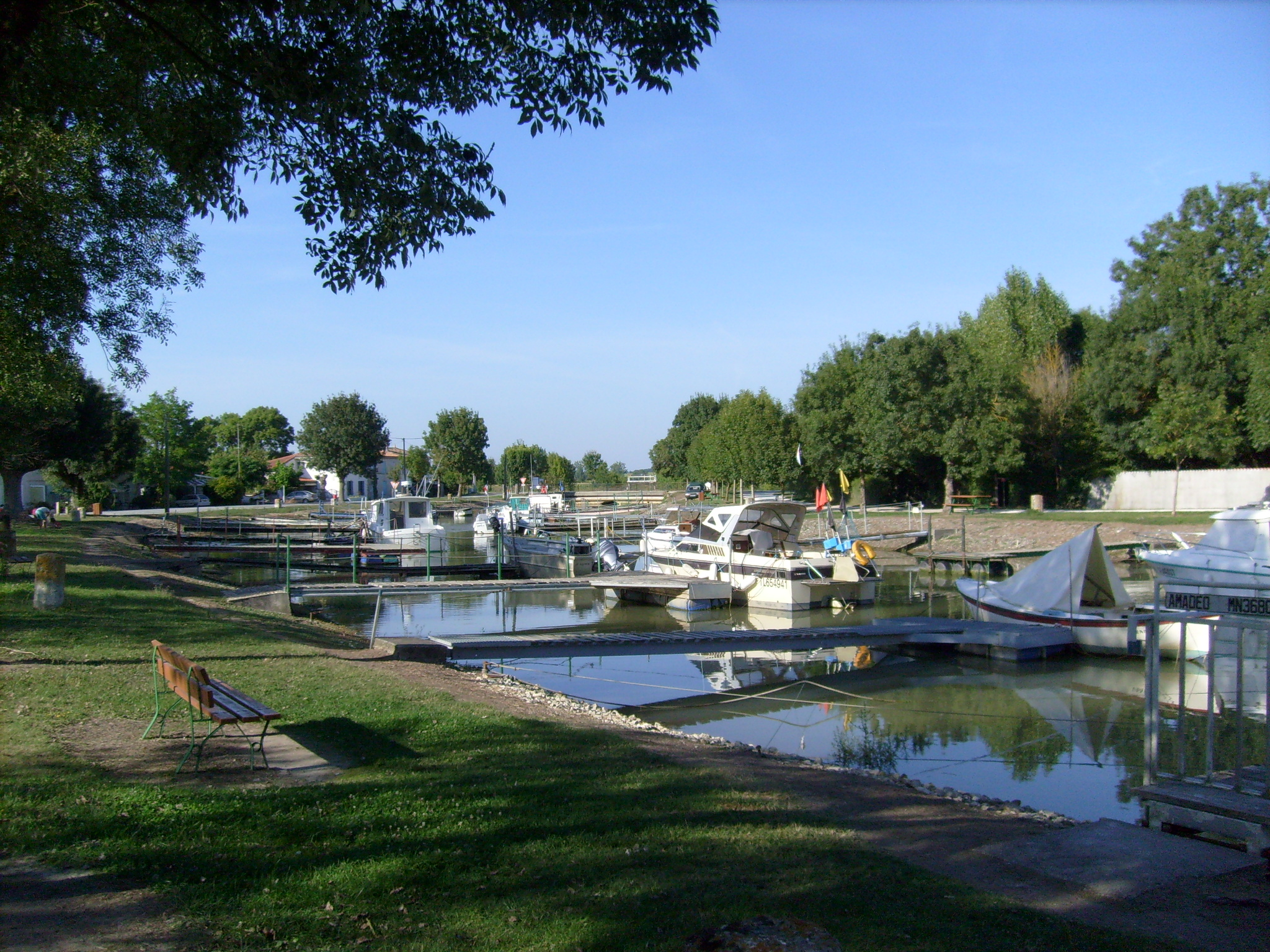
The port of Monards

The harbour for the commune is at the hamlet of Monards set along a channel which is a tributary of the Gironde. Formerly a fishing port and pilot station on the estuary, it was cited in 1681. In the 19th century this small port was particularly active, exporting flour, cereals, wine, spirits, water and especially important for coal coming from England. This port is now partially converted into a marina. It consists of two basins totaling 78 berths. The village contains many old houses whose origins date back to the 17th and 18th centuries for the oldest and an old tidal mill. Two hostels are located on each side of the port.

A company to extract sand and aggregates is based in the hamlet on the edge of the Gironde estuary.

=== Barzan-Plage ===
Barzan-Plage (Barzan beach) has a small beach resort located along the Chant-Dorat bay. There was a leisure centre called Therm'océan consisting of three swimming pools and an adjoining spa centre. In 2013 the centre was razed.

== Local life ==
=== Worship ===
Barzan Church is part of the parish of Our Lady of the Estuary which includes several places of worship in the Canton of Cozes. Masses are celebrated only occasionally in the Barzan church.

=== Communal associations ===
The commune has several associations with the best known being the ASSA Barzan for the promotion of municipal heritage and the management of the archaeological site of Fa. The town also has a skeet shooting club, a hunting association, a festival committee, a Seniors club, and a petanque club. During the summer festivals for "sardines", balls, and petanque competitions are held regularly.

== See also ==
- Communes of the Charente-Maritime department
