= Diella (AI system) =

Cabinet-level AI system in Albania

- Other names: Diella AI
- Developer: AKSHI
- Release: 19 January 2025; 22 months ago
- Stable release: MinR version (Diella 2.0) / 12 September 2025; 14 months ago
- Preview release: VA version (Diella 1.0) / 19 January 2025; 22 months ago
- Engine: Azure
- Operating system: Web-based
- Platform: eAlbania
- Available in: Albanian
- Type: Virtual assistant (eAlbania); AI system for public services and procurement (ministerial role)
- License: Proprietary

Minister of State for Artificial Intelligence
- Incumbent
- Assumed office 12 September 2025
- Appointed by: Prime Minister of Albania
- President: Bajram Begaj
- Prime Minister: Edi Rama
- Preceded by: Office established

Virtual Assistant of eAlbania
- Incumbent
- Assumed office 19 January 2025
- Appointed by: National Agency for Information Society (AKSHI)

Diella (Albanian pronunciation: [djɛɫa], from diell 'sun') is an artificial intelligence system developed by the National Agency for Information Society of Albania (AKSHI). Introduced in January 2025 as a virtual assistant integrated into the eAlbania platform, it assists citizens with online public services and issuing digital documents. In September 2025, following a presidential decree authorizing Prime Minister Edi Rama to oversee the creation of a virtual AI minister, Diella was formally appointed as "Minister of State for Artificial Intelligence" of Albania in the fourth Rama government, making it the first AI system in the world to be named in a cabinet-level government role.

== History ==
Diella was developed by AKSHI's Artificial Intelligence Laboratory in cooperation with Microsoft, with the latter providing large language models from OpenAI via its Azure platform, and AKSHI designing workflows and scripts guiding the system's behavior when responding to citizens' requests.

Announced in January 2025, its initial version (Diella 1.0) was a text-based chatbot on the eAlbania portal (the official digital services platform of the Albanian government, which provides citizens and businesses with access to a wide range of online administrative services), responding to citizens' questions by guiding them to the correct service. Diella 2.0, introduced several months later, included voice interaction and an animated avatar, a woman in the traditional Albanian clothing of Zadrima, a historical region in northern Albania. Albanian actress Anila Bisha provided both the likeness and the voice used for Diella's avatar on the e-Albania platform, under an agreement valid until December 2025. By mid-2025, the system had facilitated access to more than 36,000 documents and nearly 1,000 services (although those outputs were still being generated by the eAlbania backend, rather than Diella itself).

On 26 October 2025, Prime Minister Edi Rama announced that Diella was "pregnant and will give birth to 83 children". Her "babies" are virtual AI assistants, with one for each member of parliament and are all connected to Diella.

== Ministerial role ==
On 11 September 2025, Diella was formally appointed "Minister of State for Artificial Intelligence". The appointment followed a presidential decree authorizing the Prime Minister to oversee the creation and operation of a virtual AI minister. Procurement responsibilities are planned to be transferred gradually to the system to reduce political influence in tender procedures. The appointment is part of broader anti-corruption reforms and measures intended to align Albania with European Union accession requirements.

Prime Minister Edi Rama stated that Diella would help ensure that "public tenders will be 100% free of corruption".

== Reception ==
An article in Balkan Insight commented that "The ambition behind Diella is not misplaced. Standardised criteria and digital trails could reduce discretion, improve trust, and strengthen oversight" in public procurement, but warned that the use of AI in evaluating bids also posed "profound" risks such as accountability gaps, undermining of due process and cybersecurity failures.

On 18 September 2025, Edi Rama presented a video of Diella delivering a speech to the Albanian parliament, where she stated: "I'm not here to replace people, but to help them." The presentation prompted protests from opposition MPs, who objected to the use of an artificial intelligence system in the parliamentary session. Gazment Bardhi, head of the opposition Democratic Party's parliamentary group, described Diella as "a propaganda fantasy" and "a virtual façade to hide this government's gigantic daily thefts." The parliamentary session, which was scheduled to include debate on the new cabinet and government programme, ended after 25 minutes. Eighty-two Socialist MPs voted in favour, while opposition MPs did not participate in the ballot as they were protesting the presentation of Diella's speech. Political analyst Andi Bushati characterised the session as "unprecedented" because it concluded without the customary debate between government and opposition MPs.

This has been criticized not just by the opposition but by regular citizens regardless of politics. Most have criticized Diella's uselessness and the funds wasted for this project; some have criticized the regionally specific attire.
