= National Bureau of Investigation (Albania) =

Albanian law enforcement agency established in 2021

National Bureau of Investigation Byroja Kombëtare e Hetimit
- Abbreviation: BKH

Agency overview
- Formed: 2021

Jurisdictional structure
- Operations jurisdiction: Albania
- Legal jurisdiction: Republic of Albania

Operational structure
- Overseen by International monitoring: International Monitoring Operation (IMO)
- Headquarters: Tirana, Albania
- Agency executive: Joni Keta, Director
- Parent agency: Special Anti-Corruption Structure (SPAK)

Website
- www.bkh.al
- Investigators are trained by the FBI and subject to continuous monitoring.

The National Bureau of Investigation (Albanian: Byroja Kombëtare e Hetimit), abbreviated as BKH, is a law enforcement agency in Albania that operates under the jurisdiction of the Special Anti-Corruption Structure (SPAK). It is responsible for investigating high-level public corruption and organized crime. The BKH is modeled after the Federal Bureau of Investigation (FBI) in the United States.

== History ==
The BKH is part of Albania's broader justice reform in judicial reform process, supported by the European Union and the United States. According to the governing legislation, the Bureau will eventually include 60 investigators, who are trained by the FBI at its training academy in Virginia. The establishment of the BKH was overseen by an international monitoring commission.

The Bureau began its official operations in September 2021 with the first cohort of 28 investigators. A second group of 32 investigators was expected to be sworn in by July 2022, following a competitive selection and training process in the United States and Italy.

== Structure and operation ==
The Bureau functions through specialized investigative teams. Each team is led by the Director of the BKH, who is appointed jointly by the Chief Special Prosecutor and the SPAK prosecutors.

To safeguard the integrity of the institution, investigators are subject to continuous monitoring, including checks on their bank accounts and phone communications.

== See also ==
- Special Anti-Corruption Structure
