= Ermal Beqiri =

Albanian technology entrepreneur

- Born: 1982 (age 43–44); Gjirokastër, Albania
- Education: IUT Montpellier–Sète (Bachelor); University of Nîmes (Master)
- Occupation: Technology entrepreneur
- Known for: Founder of the Albanian Council for Technology and Innovation
- Awards: Public Service of the Year, Albanian ICT Awards (2017)

Ermal Beqiri (born in 1982, Gjirokastër, Albania) is an Albanian technology entrepreneur, IT expert and the owner of Soft & Solution Group, a company specializing in software, digital platforms, and network infrastructure. Beqiri previously served as an electronic engineer and director of IT at the University of Tirana, before gaining wider public exposure as IT expert in a high-profile case. In 2025, he was one of the individuals accused by SPAK in the AKSHI public procurement scandal. He is currently a fugitive.

== Education and career ==
Beqiri studied in France, with a Bachelor degree from the University technical institute (IUT) Montpellier–Sète, and a Master degree from the University of Nimes. He later pursued doctoral studies at the University of Tirana. His studies in electronic engineering and information technology provided the foundation for his career.

Beqiri started his career in France, where he served as a project manager and as an external lecturer at IUT GEII. Upon returning to Albania, he served as Director of Information and Technology at the University of Tirana, and subsequently was appointed as IT Director at the Central Office for Immovable Property Registration (Zyra Qendrore të Regjistrimit të Pasurive të Paluajtshme – ZRPP). He also worked as an independent expert on cyber crime.

Beqiri was awarded with “Public Service of the Year” at the Albanian ICT Awards 2017 for the project “51 services of ZRPP on the e-Albania portal”.

== Early public exposure ==
Beqiri gained national attention in 2011 as one of three court-appointed IT experts—along with Ardian Pollo and Artur Rrahmani—tasked with examining the Meta–Prifti video, a covert recording that allegedly showed former deputy prime minister Ilir Meta discussing corrupt deals with then economy minister Dritan Prifti. Their report concluded that the recording was not original, a finding that supported the defense of Ilir Meta against corruption allegations. Earlier analyses for the prosecution by British and American IT experts had assessed the recording as authentic, but their findings were dismissed by the court as inadmissible.

== Business activities ==
Beqiri founded and led several tech companies, and is the owner of Soft & Solution, a major IT company in Albania that had received over 18 million euros in direct payments from the state treasury for tenders at AKSHI from 2020 to 2024.

In 2024, Beqiri acquired 100% of Horizon SHPK (a Cypriot-owned company previously held by Comscope Limited) for €380,000. He also acquired another IT company called iTirana for €145,000. These acquisitions strengthened Beqiri’s position as a key player in Albania’s IT sector, consolidating multiple companies under his group.

In 2025, he established the Albanian Council for Technology and Innovation (ACTI), an industry association promoting cybersecurity, startups and digital policy. Media reports link ACTI to networks of companies and alleged procurement influence connected to the broader AKSHI public procurement scandal, and describe parts of its associated business environment—such as the “Durana Tech Park”—as operating as a fiscal haven for its member firms.

== AKSHI public procurement scandal ==
Beqiri, one of the largest beneficiaries of IT public tenders from AKSHI, is a central figure in SPAK's investigation into the public procurement scandal of Albania's National Agency for Information Society (AKSHI), and is accused of corruption, bid rigging, price inflation, and participation in a structured criminal group, and kidnapping another entrepreneur. SPAK alleges his companies secured millions of euros through manipulated public procurement offers, with evidence suggesting operational cooperation with Ergys Agasi including recorded communications and overlapping business interests.

Ermal Beqiri remains a fugitive, after the Special Appeals Court upheld the "arrest in prison" measure against him.

=== Asset seizure ===
In April 2026, SPAK ordered the preventive seizure of assets worth approximately 40 million euros liked to Beqiri and his collaborators, among which ten real estate assets belonging to Ermal Beqiri, including a luxury yacht (named "Skyfall"), corporate accounts, several vehicles, and personal bank accounts.

=== Revocation of license for e-money ===
In April 2026, following the arrest warrant against Ermal Beqiri by SPAK on charges of participation in a structured criminal group, the central Bank of Albania revoked the license of his electronic money institution, Soft & Solution, which operated under the brand ALPAY. According to Article 7 of the Bank of Albania's regulation on the licensing of payment and electronic money institutions, a license may be refused or revoked if a founder is under criminal prosecution for a criminal offense with high social risk.
