= List of public universities and higher education institutes in France =

This is a list of public universities and higher education institutes in France. The French Ministry of Higher Education and Research lists 160 public higher education establishments. It divides these into four categories: 65 universities, 60 écoles, 25 grands établissements, and 10 other establishments. These are detailed in the lists that follow.

== Public universities ==
In France, various types of institution have the term "University" in their name. These include the public universities, which are the autonomous institutions that are distinguished as being state institutes of higher education and research that practice open admissions, and that are designated with the label "Université" by the French ministry of Higher Education and Research. These also include the communities of universities and institutions (COMUEs), which are degree-granting federated groups of universities and other institutes of higher education. The COMUEs replace the earlier Pôles de recherche et d'enseignement supérieur (PRES), which were groupings of universities and institutes of higher education that existed from 2007 to 2013. As opposed to the PRES, the COMUEs can grant degrees in their own names.

Other types of French university-like institutions can be found in the list of colleges and universities in France; these include the national polytechnic institutes, the grandes écoles (among which are the three universities of technology), and private universities, such as the Catholic universities, the Protestant universities, the private secular universities, and the American University of Paris.

As of 1 May 2025, there are 65 public universities in France:

Public universities in France
Short name	Article	French Wikipedia article	Academy
Aix-Marseille	Aix-Marseille University	Université d'Aix-Marseille	Aix-Marseille
Angers	University of Angers	Université d'Angers	Nantes
Artois	University of Artois	Université d'Artois	Lille
Avignon	Avignon University	Avignon Université	Aix-Marseille
Bordeaux	University of Bordeaux	Université de Bordeaux	Bordeaux
Bordeaux Montaigne	Bordeaux Montaigne University	Université Bordeaux-Montaigne	Bordeaux
Burgundy	University of Burgundy Europe	Université Bourgogne-Europe	Dijon
Caen Normandy	University of Caen Normandy	Université de Caen-Normandie	Normandy
Claude Bernard Lyon 1	Claude Bernard University Lyon 1	Université Claude-Bernard-Lyon-I	Lyon
Clermont Auvergne	Clermont Auvergne University	Université Clermont-Auvergne	Clermont-Ferrand
Corsica Pasquale Paoli	University Pasquale Paoli	Université de Corse-Pascal-Paoli	Corsica
CY Cergy Paris	CY Cergy Paris University	Université de Cergy-Pontoise	Versailles
Évry Paris-Saclay	University of Évry Paris-Saclay	Université Évry Paris-Saclay	Versailles
Marie and Louis Pasteur	Marie and Louis Pasteur University	Université Marie et Louis Pasteur	Besançon
French Antilles	University of the French Antilles	Université des Antilles	Guadeloupe
French Guiana	University of French Guiana	Université de Guyane	French Guiana
French Polynesia	University of French Polynesia	Université de la Polynésie française	French Polynesia
Gustave Eiffel	Gustave Eiffel University	Université Gustave-Eiffel	Créteil
Jean Monnet	Jean Monnet University	Université Jean-Monnet-Saint-Étienne	Lyon
Jean Moulin Lyon 3	Jean Moulin University Lyon 3	Université Jean-Moulin-Lyon-III	Lyon
La Rochelle	La Rochelle University	Université de La Rochelle	Poitiers
Le Havre Normandy	Le Havre Normandy University	Université Le Havre Normandie	Normandy
Le Mans	Le Mans University	Université du Mans	Nantes
Lille	University of Lille	Université de Lille	Lille
Limoges	University of Limoges	Université de Limoges	Limoges
Littoral Opal Coast	University of the Littoral Opal Coast	Université du Littoral-Côte-d'Opale	Lille
Lumière Lyon 2	Lumière University Lyon 2	Université Lumière-Lyon-II	Lyon
Mayotte	University of Mayotte	Université de Mayotte	Mayotte
Montpellier	University of Montpellier	Université de Montpellier	Montpellier
Nantes	University of Nantes	Nantes Université	Nantes
New Caledonia	University of New Caledonia	Université de la Nouvelle-Calédonie	New Caledonia
Nîmes	University of Nîmes	Nîmes Université	Montpellier
Orléans	University of Orléans	Université d'Orléans	Orléans and Tours
Paris	Paris Cité University	Université Paris-Cité	Paris
Paris-East Créteil	Paris-East Créteil University	Université Paris-Est-Créteil-Val-de-Marne	Créteil
Paris Nanterre	Paris Nanterre University	Université Paris-Nanterre	Versailles
Paris-Saclay	Paris-Saclay University	Université Paris-Saclay	Versailles
Paris 1 Panthéon Sorbonne	Paris 1 Panthéon Sorbonne University	Université Paris-I-Panthéon-Sorbonne	Paris
Paris-Panthéon-Assas	Paris-Panthéon-Assas University	Université Paris-Panthéon-Assas	Paris
Paris 8 Vincennes-Saint-Denis	Paris 8 University Vincennes-Saint-Denis	Université Paris-VIII-Vincennes-Saint-Denis	Créteil
Pau and the Adour	University of Pau and the Adour Region	Université de Pau et des pays de l'Adour	Bordeaux
Paul Valéry Montpellier 3	University of Montpellier Paul Valéry	Université de Montpellier Paul-Valéry	Montpellier
Perpignan Via Domitia	University of Perpignan Via Domitia	Université de Perpignan	Montpellier
Picardy Jules Verne	University of Picardy Jules Verne	Université de Picardie Jules-Verne	Amiens
Poitiers	University of Poitiers	Université de Poitiers	Poitiers
Polytechnic Hauts-de-France	Polytechnic University of Hauts-de-France	Université polytechnique Hauts-de-France	Lille
Rennes	University of Rennes	Université de Rennes	Rennes
Rennes 2	Rennes 2 University	Université Rennes-II	Rennes
Reims Champagne-Ardenne	University of Reims Champagne-Ardenne	Université de Reims-Champagne-Ardenne	Reims
Reunion Island	University of Reunion Island	Université de La Réunion	Réunion
Rouen Normandy	University of Rouen Normandy	Université de Rouen-Normandie	Normandy
Savoie Mont Blanc	Université Savoie Mont Blanc	Université Savoie-Mont-Blanc	Grenoble
Sorbonne	Sorbonne University	Sorbonne Université	Paris
Sorbonne Nouvelle Paris 3	Sorbonne Nouvelle University Paris 3	Université Sorbonne-Nouvelle	Paris
Sorbonne Paris North	Sorbonne Paris North University	Université Sorbonne-Paris-Nord	Créteil
Southern Brittany	Southern Brittany University	Université Bretagne-Sud	Rennes
Strasbourg	University of Strasbourg	Université de Strasbourg	Strasbourg
Toulon	University of Toulon	Université de Toulon	Nice
Toulouse	University of Toulouse	Université de Toulouse	Toulouse
Toulouse Capitole	Toulouse Capitole University	Université Toulouse-Capitole	Toulouse
Toulouse-Jean Jaurès	University of Toulouse-Jean Jaurès	Université Toulouse-Jean-Jaurès	Toulouse
Tours	University of Tours	Université de Tours	Orléans and Tours
Upper Alsace	University of Upper Alsace	Université de Haute-Alsace	Strasbourg
Versailles Saint-Quentin-en-Yvelines	University of Versailles Saint-Quentin-en-Yvelines	Université de Versailles—Saint-Quentin-en-Yvelines	Versailles
Western Brittany	University of Western Brittany	Université de Bretagne-Occidentale	Rennes

== Écoles ==
Public higher education écoles in France
Short name	Article	French Wikipedia article	Type
Centrale Lille	École Centrale de Lille	École centrale de Lille	École centrale
Centrale Lyon	École centrale de Lyon	École centrale de Lyon	École centrale
Centrale Nantes	École centrale de Nantes	École centrale de Nantes	École centrale
Centrale Méditerranée	Centrale Méditerranée	Centrale Méditerranée	École centrale
INSA Lyon			Institutes of applied science
INSA Rennes			Institutes of applied science
INSA Toulouse			Institutes of applied science
INSA Rouen Normandie			Institutes of applied science
INSA Strasbourg			Institutes of applied science
INS Centre Val de Loire			Institutes of applied science

== Historical or other universities ==
Historically, France has had city-wide public university systems:

- University of Clermont-Ferrand
- University of Paris
- University of Grenoble
- University of Lyon
- Centre universitaire de formation et de recherche de Mayotte
- University of Rennes
- Université européenne de Bretagne
- Louis Pasteur University (now part of the University of Strasbourg)
- Marc Bloch University (now part of the University of Strasbourg)
- Robert Schuman University (now part of the University of Strasbourg)
- University of Toulouse
- UniverSud Paris
- Lille 1, Lille 2, Lille 3 (now part of the University of Lille)

== See also ==
- List of colleges and universities in France
- List of colleges and universities by country
- Pôle de recherche et d'enseignement supérieur
- Grandes écoles
- Education in France
- Franco-German University
