= ONM (disambiguation) =

ONM may refer to:

- Official Nintendo Magazine, a British video game magazine that ran from 2006 to 2014
- Ohio Naval Militia, the naval militia of the State of Ohio
- Operacioni Ndërkombëtar i Monitorimit, a monitoring operation set up to oversee the vetting process of judiciary members in Albania
- Opera Nazionale Montessori, an Italian cultural institution and publishing house
- Osage Nation Museum, devoted to Osage history, art, and culture
