= Ilir Beqaj =

Albanian politician

Member of the Albanian Parliament for Dibër
- In office September 9, 2017 – 25 June 2021

Minister of Health
- In office 15 September 2013 – 19 March 2017
- Prime Minister: Edi Rama
- Preceded by: Halim Kosova
- Succeeded by: Ogerta Manastirliu

Personal details
- Born: 18 February 1968 (age 58) Tirana, Albania
- Party: Socialist
- Spouse: Adriana Beqaj
- Children: 1 daughter
- Education: University of Tirana

Ilir Hamit Beqaj (born 18 February 1968) is an Albanian IT engineer and politician with the Socialist Party of Albania, who served as the Minister of Health of Albania from 15 September 2013 to 12 March 2017.

As of 2024, Beqaj is being held in prison due to two criminal cases against him. The first case concerns the scandal of the irregular award to a company of the supply of sterilization equipment for surgical instruments in public hospitals, and the second concerns the abuse of EU funds while holding the position of director of the "State Agency for Strategic Programming and Assistance Coordination" (SASPAC). Bejal was arrested in July 2024 at the behest of SPAK on charges of "Abuse of duty", "Violation of equality in tenders" and "Passive corruption".

== Biography ==
He is married to Adriana Beqaj and has a daughter, Deborah.

He holds a post-graduate degree in Enterprise Management at the French Management Institute at the Polytechnic University of Tirana (1999–2000).

He completed his university studies in information technology at the University of Tirana (1985–1990).

He used to work at the Bank of Albania as an information technology expert from 1990 to 1993 and as part of the Fiscal Information Unit from 1993 to 1994. For the period between 1994 and 2006, Beqaj held various functions within the "Social Insurance Institute". He was appointed Director General of the Institute from 2003 to 2006.

Was elected as Member of the Assembly of Albania for Shkodër constituency in the 2009–2013 legislature. In the last 2013 parliamentary elections he was elected as Member of the Albanian Assembly for Durrës constituency.

He is member of the Socialist Party Assembly since 2007.

From 2007 to 2011 he held the office of the assistant secretary of the programme of the Socialist Party.

He is a member of the Party's chairmanship and Secretary of Programme at the Socialist Party since 2011.
