= Special Structure against Corruption and Organized Crime =

Government agency of Albania

Special Structure against Corruption and Organized Crime Struktura e Posaçme Kundër Korrupsionit dhe Krimit të Organizuar
- Abbreviation: SPAK

Agency overview
- Formed: 25 November 2019

Jurisdictional structure
- National agency (Operations jurisdiction): Albania
- Operations jurisdiction: Albania
- Legal jurisdiction: Republic of Albania
- Specialist jurisdictions: Anti-corruption

Operational structure
- Overseen by International monitoring: International Monitoring Operation (IMO)
- Headquarters: Tirana, Albania
- Agency executive: Klodjan Braho, Chairman

Website
- spak.gov.al

The Special Structure against Corruption and Organized Crime (Albanian: Struktura e Posaçme Kundër Korrupsionit dhe Krimit të Organizuar, SPAK) is an independent judicial entity tasked with investigating corruption and organized crime at the highest levels of government and society in Albania. It was instituted through the passage of Article 148/dh of the Albanian constitution and the structure's organic law (Note: Law (no. 95/2016) on the organization and functioning of institutions for the fight against corruption and organized crime), both of which were the result of significant reforms of the country's justice system, brought forward in 2016 with cross-party support.

The entity has received praise from the EU for targeting high-profile corruption cases.

== Organizational structure ==
National Bureau of Investigation (Albanian: Byroja Kombëtare e Hetimit – BKH) is a specialized unit of the Judicial Police responsible for investigating criminal offenses within the jurisdiction of the Special Prosecution, as defined by the Code of Criminal Procedure. The BKH consists of a director, investigators and Judicial Police services, all operating under the direct supervision of the Special Prosecution.

Special Prosecution (Albanian: Prokuroria e Posaçme kundër Korrupsionit dhe Krimit të Organizuar – PPKKO) is responsible for prosecuting cases and representing the state before the Special Courts. It oversees the enforcement of criminal decisions and carries out other legally mandated duties. Operating independently, the office is composed of special prosecutors appointed by the High Prosecution Council.

== Special courts ==
=== First instance ===
The Special Court Against Corruption and Organized Crime (Albanian: Gjykata Speciale kundër Korrupsionit dhe Krimit të Organizuar – GJKKO), which is the successor of the Serious Crimes Court, is composed of 18 judges, of which 5 are permanent and 13 are temporary. It handles all cases brought forth by the Special Prosecution.

=== Second instance (appeal) ===
The Special Court of Appeal for Corruption and Organized Crime (Albanian: Gjykata e Posaçme e Apelit për Korrupsion dhe Krim të Organizuar) serves as the appellate body for cases adjudicated by the Special Court of First Instance.

== Leadership ==
The chairman of SPAK is elected by the High Prosecutorial Council (Albanian: Këshilli i Lartë i Prokurorisë – KLP) through an official voting process. Candidates must undergo public hearings where they present their vision, after which the members of the Council vote to elect the chairman. The term of the chairman is 3 years, and re-election for a consecutive term is not allowed.

Altin Dumani served as chairman of SPAK from 19 December 2022 to 18 December 2025. On 19 December 2025, he was succeeded by Klodjan Braho, who is the current chairman.

== High-profile cases ==
=== Incinerators scandal ===
In response to complaints from Democratic Party MPs, in October 2020, SPAK initiated a series of investigations into the construction and operation of incinerators throughout Albania. Several high-ranking officials have already been convicted in connection with the case, facing charges of corruption and abuse of power.

=== Fraud in a public procurement for sterilization equipment ===
In August 2023, former Deputy Health Minister Klodjan Rrjepaj and Health Minister Ilir Beqaj, along with others, were arrested on charges of abuse of office, fraud and falsification of documents. The case involves a €100 million contract signed in 2015 for the sterilization of surgical equipment in public hospitals. According to SPAK, the tender process was manipulated to undermine fair competition, favoring businessman Ilir Rrapaj, who was also among those arrested.

=== Indictment of Sali Berisha ===
In October 2023, SPAK launched an investigation into former President Sali Berisha over allegations of abuse of power. In December of that year, he was placed under house arrest for failing to comply with a court order requiring him to report to the police every two weeks. In September 2024, Berisha was formally charged with passive corruption, accused of using his influence as prime minister (2005–2009) to benefit his son-in-law in the privatization of state land in Tirana. Both Berisha and the Democratic Party have repeatedly denounced the charges, accusing the Rama government of violating the constitution and using “Stalinist measures” to suppress political opposition.

=== Indictment and arrest of Evis Berberi ===
In March 2024, Evis Berberi, former Director General of the Albanian Road Authority, was arrested on charges of accepting bribes from companies that were awarded public contracts. According to SPAK, he is suspected of benefiting from approximately €2 million, allegedly invested in real estate through a company he established to evade detection.

=== Dismantling of an organized crime gang ===
In August 2024, the Albanian State Police arrested 15 members of an organized crime gang during a series of coordinated raids in Tirana. The operation was carried out with support from Europol and authorities in France and Belgium, who provided key intelligence to identify the suspects. The gang operated on an international scale, engaging in contract killings, drug trafficking and money laundering through cryptocurrency transactions.

=== Indictment and arrest of Ilir Meta ===
On October 21, 2024, Ilir Meta, former President of Albania, was arrested on charges of money laundering, passive corruption, non-declaration and concealment of assets. His party, the Freedom Party (PL), denounced the arrest as political persecution aimed at silencing the opposition. This marks the most high-profile corruption case since the establishment of SPAK, making Meta the second opposition leader to be detained, following Sali Berisha, who until recently remained under house arrest.

=== Indictment and arrest of Erion Veliaj ===
The mayor of Tirana, Erion Veliaj, was arrested on February 11, 2025, on charges of corruption and money laundering. Veliaj denied the charges. SPAK determined that he should be held in pre-trial detention due to attempts to tamper with evidence and intimidate witnesses. Veliaj and his lawyers have objected to Veliaj's pre-trial detention, including complaints that he has been denied access to his international legal counsel and kept in custody pursuant to court decisions that critics argue did not meaningfully assess necessity, proportionality, or alternatives to detention. Charges filed in July 2025 included abuse of office, corruption, money laundering, concealment of assets, and bringing illegal items into prison.

Former justice ministers Ylli Manjani and Fatmir Xhafaj publicly questioned the handling of the case. However, court documents cite the risk of influencing justice, particularly for high ranking officials as Veliaj, who can exert their power to tamper with evidence and intimidate witnesses. In 2026, Veliaj filed a lawsuit challenging the legality of the appointment of prosecutor Olsi Dado, arguing that procedural irregularities could affect the validity of related proceedings.

=== Indictment of Belinda Balluku ===
In October 2025, SPAK announced criminal charges against Belinda Balluku and several officials from the Ministry of Infrastructure and Energy in connection with the public tender for the Llogara Tunnel. According to the prosecutors' filing, Signal messages recovered from the phone of Evis Berberi, then director of the Albanian Road Authority, allegedly showed Balluku discussing tender deadlines and bidder details. SPAK accuses the group of "creating unjust advantages" for the Turkish consortium Intekar Yapi & ASL Insaat in violation of Albania's procurement laws (Law 162/2020 and Decision 285/2021). Balluku has denied any wrongdoing. On 20 November 2025, the Special Court Against Corruption and Organized Crime ordered two security measures against Deputy Prime Minister and Minister of Infrastructure and Energy Belinda Balluku: suspension from her governmental duties and a ban on leaving the country. Balluku had previously stated in parliament that she would not comment on ongoing investigations and had reaffirmed her support for the justice reform.

=== AKSHI public procurement investigation ===
In late 2025, SPAK announced a high-profile investigation into systemic corruption within the National Agency for Information Society (AKSHI). Prosecutors allege that a sophisticated criminal network rigged at least twelve public procurement procedures. Central to the investigation are businessmen Ermal Beqiri and Ergys Agasi. SPAK issued arrest warrants for both, with charges including money laundering, illegal competition, unlawful deprivation of liberty, violation of procurement offer equality, and participation in a structured criminal group. The crackdown also reached the highest levels of AKSHI's leadership. Director Mirlinda Karçanaj and Deputy Director Hava Delibashi were placed under house arrest, while several other officials were hit with travel bans or mandatory reporting requirements. Prosecutors state that intercepted communications, digital recordings, and financial trails provide compelling evidence that lucrative contracts were deliberately steered toward companies linked to Beqiri and his collaborators.

== Reception and assessments ==
=== Praise ===
The European Union has repeatedly praised Albania's Special Anti-Corruption Structure (SPAK) for strengthening the country's fight against corruption and organized crime.

European Commission progress reports have stated that SPAK has developed a "solid track record" in investigating, prosecuting and adjudicating corruption cases, including those involving high-level officials, while emphasizing the need to further consolidate results.

EU officials and diplomats have also commended SPAK's operational independence and investigations targeting senior political and criminal figures, describing the institution as a "bright spot" in the country's reform process. The EU Ambassador to Albania, Silvio Gonzato, said that EU member states "extremely appreciate the work done by SPAK," including investigations and cooperation against criminal networks and corruption.

SPAK has significant support from the general public in Albania.

=== Criticisms ===
SPAK has faced criticism from some commentators regarding its enforcement priorities with concerns raised about consistency and perceived selectivity in case selection.

SPAK's use of pre-trial detention has drawn scrutiny within the broader context of Albania’s justice system, where a relatively high proportion of detainees are held pending trial. Within this framework, SPAK applies the legal instruments available under Albanian law. Some legal commentators, including Dorian Matlia, have criticized specific detention practices following rulings by the European Court of Human Rights, while opinion writers such as Mero Baze have raised broader concerns about due process.

== See also ==
- Judiciary of Albania
