= EAlbania =

Official digital services portal of the Albanian government

e-Albania
- Type: E-government
- Location: Tirana
- Region served: Republic of Albania
- Official language: Albanian
- Parent organization: National Agency for Information Society (AKSHI)
- Subsidiaries: Diella
- Website: www.e-albania.al

e-Albania Electronic Services Platform, commonly known as e-Albania Platform or simply eAlbania, is the official online portal of the Government of Albania, designed to provide citizens and businesses with access to a wide range of public administrative services. Launched in 2015 and developed by the National Agency for Information Society (AKSHI), the platform aims to streamline government services by enabling users to access information, submit applications, and request official documents electronically.

e-Albania offers over 1280 services, ranging from personal identification requests to business permits and tax-related services. The platform promotes transparency, reduces bureaucratic delays, and allows citizens to interact with government institutions from anywhere. It is accessible via its official website and mobile applications, in both Albanian and English.

It is supported by modern technologies to ensure security, efficiency, and a user-friendly navigation experience. The platform is considered a key milestone in Albania’s digital transformation and e-governance initiatives.

== Legal framework and functions ==
The e-Albania platform operates under the legal framework of Albanian law regulating electronic communications and public digital services. Its functions, responsibilities, and the regulation of digital public services are established by the relevant legislation.

== Diella virtual assistant ==
On 19 January 2025, the National Agency for Information Society (AKSHI) introduced Diella, a virtual assistant integrated into the e-Albania platform and developed by its Artificial Intelligence Laboratory. Designed to provide real-time guidance to users navigating public services and documentation online, Diella quickly became a central tool of the government's digital infrastructure. In September 2025, Prime Minister Edi Rama elevated Diella to the role of Albania's first virtual cabinet minister, assigning it responsibility for public procurement. The system is expected to progressively assume control over the evaluation and awarding of public contracts, with the stated aim of reducing corruption in government tenders.

In November 2026, Deputy Prime Minister Albana Koçiu demonstrated an upgraded version of e-Albania in which Diella guides users through services via typed or spoken Albanian, fills in forms from voice commands, and supports facial-recognition login. The 36 services most used by pensioners were simplified first, with the changes expected to extend to all 1,280 services on the platform.
