= University of Mayotte =

The University of Mayotte (French: Université de Mayotte) is a French public university created on 1 January 2024. It was formerly the Mayotte University Center for Teaching and Research.
