= Ergys Agasi =

Albanian businessman

Ergys Agasi is an Albanian businessman from Durrës, involved in sectors such as cigarette production, logistics, construction and information services. Agasi is noted, in the Albanian context, as an influential figure in Durrës, linked to political and criminal interests, and has been described as "the shadow man" of the government of Edi Rama. He is one of the main protagonists, charged by SPAK in the AKSHI public procurement scandal.

He is the son of former Socialist Party Member of Parliament Bardhyl Agasi.

== Political involvement ==
Agasi entered politics as a militant and associate of Ilir Meta in his party LSI, and served in governmental positions during the period when LSI was part of the governing coalition with Edi Rama's Socialist Party (PS). From 2014-2017, when LSI member Lefter Koka was minister, Agasi held the position of Director of Inspektorati i Mjedisit (Environmental Inspectorate). He held this role at the time when the controversial incinerator contracts were being implemented.

After the coalition between Ilir Meta's LSI and Edi Rama's PS broke, Agasi switched sides and aligned himself with Rama's circle.

== Mention in Report (Rai 3) ==
In June 2024 former Socialist deputy Prime Minister Arben Ahmetaj, during an interview for the Italian investigative program Report on Rai 3, mentioned Ergys Agasi as the key coordinator and intermediary between Prime Minister Edi Rama and criminal groups, allegedly used for electoral manipulation. Agasi rejected the accusations at the time.

== AKSHI public procurement investigation ==
In December 2025, Agasi faced accusations from the Special Structure against Corruption and Organized Crime (SPAK) that he leads a structured criminal group involved in manipulating governmental bids and procurements at the National Agency for Information Society (AKSHI). According to SPAK, Ergys Agasi, together with businessman Ermal Beqiri, are the main leaders of the group.

On 16 December 2025 SPAK issued an arrest warrant for Agasi on several charges, including involvement in corruption, illegal competition, and links to organized crime, manipulation of procurement offers, hostage-taking, and exerting improper influence over state procurement processes. He evaded capture during the operation and remains a fugitive.

=== Agasi's alleged role ===
According to SPAK Agasi used his close ties with then AKSHI director Mirlinda Karçanaj, to predetermine the winners of public tenders in favor of companies under the control of Ermal Beqiri and Ergys Agasi, and using his company "E.A. Solution" to receive large sums of money, around 9 million euros in two years, via fictitious service invoices when the company does not appear to have performed any specific services.

Prosecutors furthermore claim that Agasi participated in the hostage-taking of a competing businessman, Gerond Meçe, who had filed complaints against the rigged public procurement procedures. Meçe was allegedly abducted, threatened and forced to withdraw his complaints.

In April 2026, SPAK seized assets worth approximately 40 million euros liked to Agasi and his collaborators. Agasi alone had 29 properties seized, including luxury apartments, villas, land, and vehicles in prime locations in Tirana and Durrës.

== See also ==
- Ermal Beqiri
- AKSHI
