= University of Nîmes =

French university based in Nîmes, created in 2007

Coordinates: 43.842613°N 4.356943°E

University of Nîmes, or Unîmes
- Université de Nîmes
- Type: Public
- Established: 7 May 2007
- Location: Nîmes, France
- Website: https://www.unimes.fr/en/

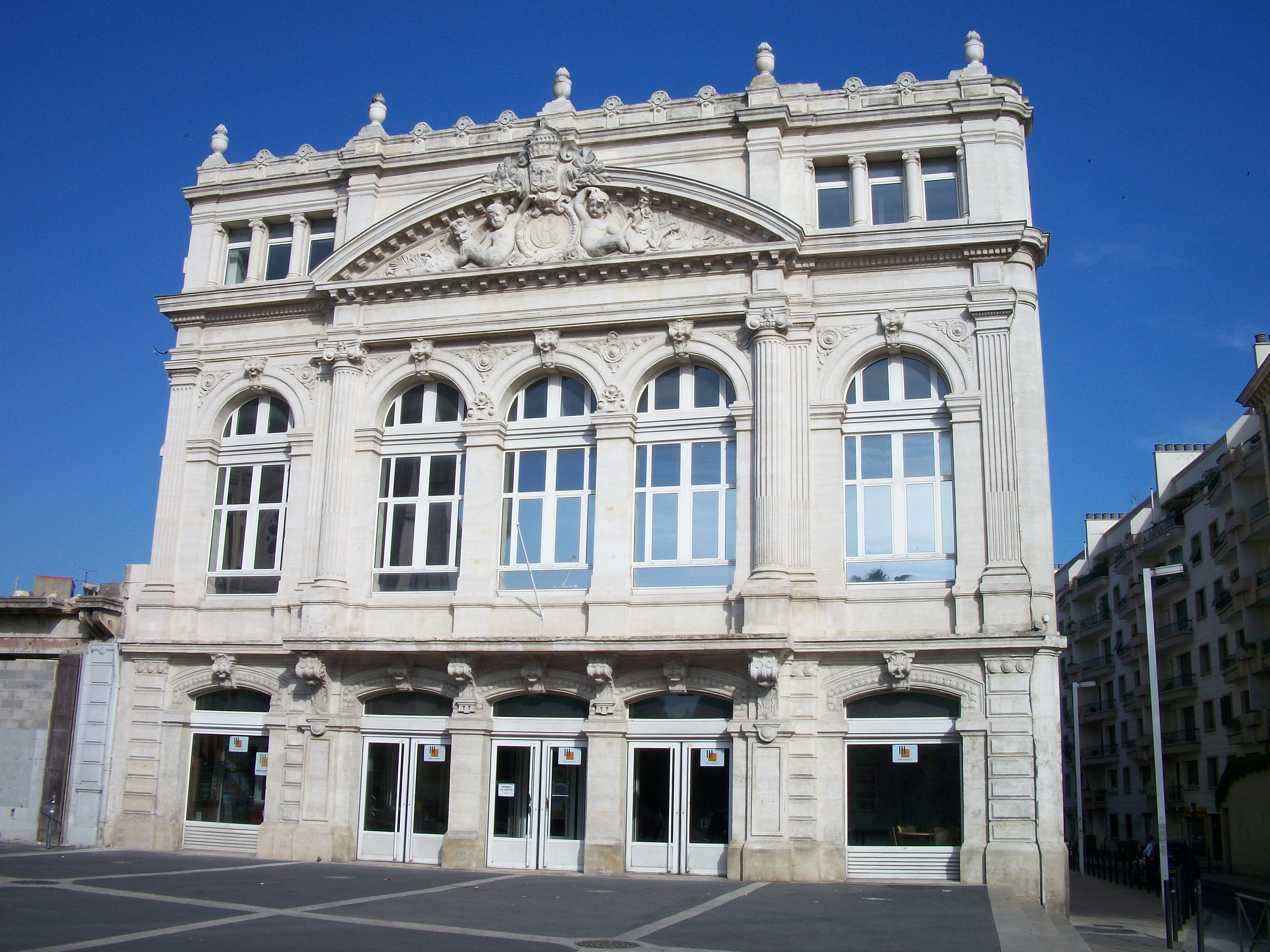
The Carmes building

The University of Nîmes (Université de Nîmes), also known as Unîmes, is a French university, in the Academy of Montpellier. It was founded on 7 May 2007 as the successor to the Nîmes University Center for Training and Research (Centre Universitaire de Formation et de Recherche de Nîmes), which already bore the short name Unîmes. As of 2023, it had 5,687 students enrolled.

The University of Nîmes offers undergraduate and graduate programs across four faculties: Faculty of Law, Economics, Management; Faculty of Arts, Letters, Languages; Faculty of Science and Technology; and Faculty of Social Sciences.

The university offers courses in English, Spanish, and German, and it welcomes students from all backgrounds and nationalities.

== See also ==
- List of early modern universities in Europe
- List of public universities in France by academy
