= National Agency for Information Society (Albania) =

Government agency of Albania

- Agjencia Kombëtare e Shoqërisë së Informacionit

Agency overview
- Formed: 2007
- Jurisdiction: Albania
- Headquarters: Tirana
- Agency executive: Mirlinda "Linda" Karçanaj, Director
- Child agency: eAlbania
- Website: akshi.gov.al

The National Agency for Information Society (AKSHI; Albanian: Agjencia Kombëtare e Shoqërisë së Informacionit) is an institution of the Albanian Government under the direct supervision of the Prime Minister's Office. AKSHI's mission is to coordinate the development and administration of state information systems and promote the development of Information Society in Albania.

Within the 2009-2013 "Albania in the Digital Age" objective of the government led by Edi Rama, new legislation was adopted in line with EU standards enabling the digitalization of the National Civil Registry, the Electronic Public Procurement System, as well as the electronic provision of the Tax Service (since 2008) and Customs Declarations.

AKSHI developed and still administers the e-Albania portal which serves as a gateway through which any interested citizen can access via electronic means services provided by public institutions in Albania.

The current director is Mirlinda Karçanaj.

== AKSHI Public Procurement Investigation ==
In late 2025, SPAK unveiled a high-profile investigation into systemic corruption within the National Agency for Information Society (AKSHI). Prosecutors allege that a sophisticated criminal network rigged at least twelve public procurement procedures. Central to the investigation are businessmen Ermal Beqiri and Ergys Agasi. SPAK issued arrest warrants for both, with charges including money laundering, illegal competition, unlawful deprivation of liberty, violation of procurement offer equality, and participation in a structured criminal group. The crackdown also reached the highest levels of AKSHI’s leadership. Director Mirlinda Karçanaj and Deputy Director Hava Delibashi were placed under house arrest, while several other officials were hit with travel bans or mandatory reporting requirements. Prosecutors state that intercepted communications, digital recordings, and financial trails provide compelling evidence that lucrative contracts were deliberately steered toward companies linked to Beqiri and his collaborators.
