= La Rochelle University =

French university

La Rochelle Université
- La Rochelle Université
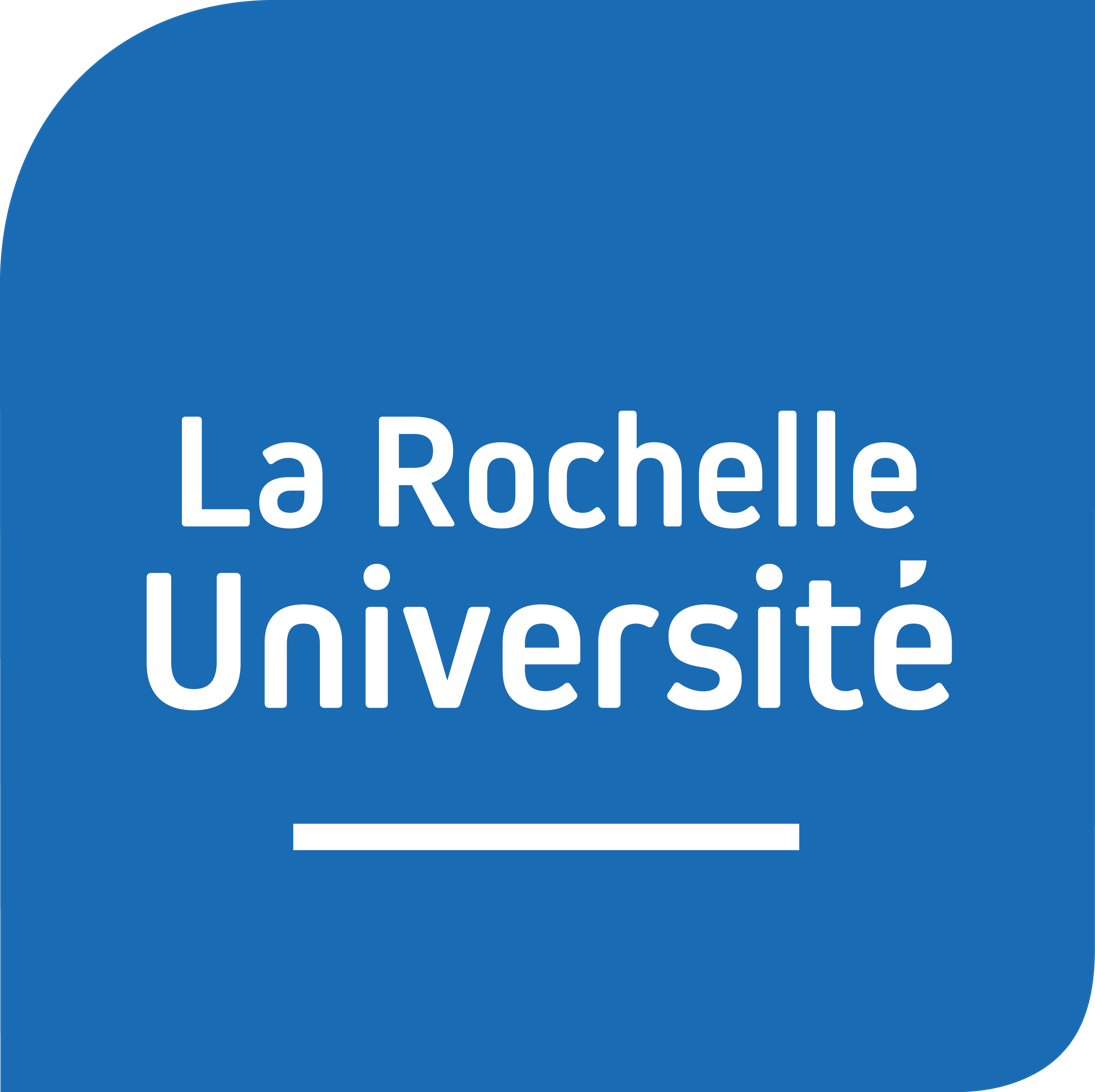
- Type: Public
- Established: January 20, 1993; 33 years ago
- Endowment: €106.9 million
- President: Jean-Marc Ogier
- Faculty: 470
- Administrative staff: 468
- Students: 8 655
- Location: La Rochelle, France; 46°8′52″N 1°9′18″W
- Campus: Urban
- Website: www.univ-larochelle.fr

La Rochelle Université (La Rochelle Université) is a French public university, based in La Rochelle. Founded in 1993, La Rochelle Université belongs to the Academy of Poitiers. In 2021, the university counted nearly 9000 students.

La Rochelle Université is expert on matters related to Smart Urban Coastal Sustainability. In 2019, alongside 9 other European universities, La Rochelle Université launched the first European university dedicated to Smart Urban Coastal Sustainability: EU-CONEXUS. The French university is leading this European University.

== Components ==
La Rochelle Université is structured around 3 higher education component and 1 technological institution of the university (IUT in French) :

- The License Collegium which gathers all disciplinary departments teaching licence degrees.
- The Smart Urban Coastal Sustainability Institute (SmUCS) which includes all research and courses related to this topic
- The law, politics and management faculty in which belongs Institute of Business Administration (IAE, in French).
- Technological Institution of the university which provides University Technological Bachelor in business, communications, engineering as well as informatics.

== PhD School ==
La Rochelle Université also includes 1 PhD School.

== Education ==
In 2022, La Rochelle Université provides a wide range of higher education trainings: 5 university technological bachelors, 16 general licence degrees, 19 professional licence degrees, 35 masters, 16 technological university diplomas (D.U in French). The university also trains students for high school diploma equivalences, administrative competitions, as for judicial careers or teaching positions.

== Research ==
When it comes to research, La Rochelle Université consists of 12 laboratories and 5 research federations. Its laboratories focus on various topics such as marine megafauna conservation, coastal environment, politics and legal studies, mathematics, management, Asian interculture...

Throughout the years, La Rochelle Université has put coastal environment at the center of its research institutions, laboratories and federations. Nowadays, the university holds a nationally and internationally recognized expertise on topics related to Smart Urban Coastal Sustainability (SmUCS).

== International ==
La Rochelle Université benefits from a strong international reputation. In 2021, 150 students went to study abroad in one of the 169 partner universities of La Rochelle Université. From North to South America, through Western Europe, Asia or Australia & New Zealand, students are offered multiple destinations to go learn from other countries. The university itself also welcomed 105 students from abroad in 2021.

== See also ==
- List of public universities in France by academy
