= International Monitoring Operation (Albania) =

Albanian government operation

- Operacioni Ndërkombëtar i Monitorimit
- Official logo
- Jurisdiction: Albania
- Location: Tirana
- Authorised by: Constitution of Albania

Head Observer
- Currently: Genoveva Ruiz Calavera

The International Monitoring Operation (OMN) (Albanian: Operacioni Ndërkombëtar i Monitorimit) is a monitoring operation set up to oversee the vetting process of judiciary members in Albania.

The justice reform package adopted in 2016 aimed at restoring public confidence in the judiciary. As part of the reform, specific provisions for the re-evaluation of judges, prosecutors and current legal advisors / assistants (vetting process) were put in place which addressed three key concerns: integrity, ethical training and professional skills.

ONM has no executive functions that affect the current re-evaluation of judges and prosecutors in the country, a task which is carried out by the local self-governing bodies.

The involvement of the international community, as foreseen in the constitution, is considered crucial for the credibility of the process as a whole.
