= 26th Kuvendi =

Twenty-sixth Legislature of Albania Legjislatura e njëzet e gjashtë e Shqipërisë
- XXVIII Legislature; V Pluralist Legislature

Type
- Type: Unicameral
- Term limits: Four years

History
- Founded: September 3, 2001
- Disbanded: May 20, 2005
- Preceded by: 25th Legislature
- Succeeded by: 27th Legislature

Leadership
- Speaker of the Parliament: Namik Dokle; Servet Pëllumbi, PS
- Prime Minister: Ilir Meta; Pandeli Majko; Fatos Nano

Structure
- Seats: 140 deputies
- Political groups: Government (83): PS (73); PSD (4); AD (3); PBDNJ (3); Opposition (57): BPF (46); PDR (6); PAA (3); Independent (2)

Elections
- Last election: 3 September 2001

Website
- www.parlament.al

The Twenty-sixth Legislature of Albania (Albanian: Legjislatura e njëzet e gjashtë), officially known as the V Pluralist Legislature of Albania (Albanian: Legjislatura e V Pluraliste e Shqipërisë), was the legislature of Albania following the 2001 Albanian Parliamentary election of Members of Parliament (MPs) to the Albanian Parliament. The party of the Prime Minister Ilir Meta, PS, obtained majority of 83 deputies.

== 26th Legislature ==
The two largest political parties in Albania are the Socialist Party (PS) and the Democratic Party (PD).Following is a list of political parties and alliances with representation in the Parliament by the 3 September 2001 elections:

Name	Abbr.	Founded	Leader	Ideology	MPs
Socialist Party of Albania Partia Socialiste e Shqipërisë	PS	1991	Ilir Meta	Social democracy, Centre-left	73 / 140
Union for Victory Coalition Bashkimi për Fitoren	BPF	2001	Gent Strazimiri	Centre-right	46 / 140
New Democratic Party Partia Demokrate e Re	PDR	1999	Genc Pollo	Liberal conservatism, Conservatism, Centre-right	6 / 140
Social Democratic Party of Albania Partia Socialdemokrate e Shqipërisë	PSD	1991	Skënder Gjinushi	Social democracy, Centre-left	4 / 140
Agrarian Party of Albania Partia Agrare e Shqipërisë	PAA	1991	Lufter Xhuveli	Agrarianism, Centre	3 / 140
Unity for Human Rights Party Partia Bashkimi për të Drejtat e Njeriut	PBDNJ	1992	Vangjel Dule	Social Liberalism, Greek minority interests, Centre	3 / 140
Democratic Alliance Party Partia Aleanca Demokratike	AD	1992	Neritan Ceka	Liberalism, Centre	3 / 140
Independents Të pavarur				Independent	2 / 140

== MPS ==
1. Agron Duka PS
2. Agron Tato PS
3. Albert Çaçi PS
4. Aleksandër Garuli PD
5. Anastas Angjeli PS
6. Arben Imami AD
7. Arben Malaj PS
8. Ardian Myslimaj PS
9. Arjan Starova BLD
10. Arta Dade PS
11. Asllan Haxhiu PS
12. Astrit Bushati PD
13. Ardit Kaja PS
14. Athem Fezollari PD
15. Azgan Haklaj PD
16. Bamir Topi PD
17. Banush Gozhdari PS
18. Bardhyl Agasi PS
19. Bardhyl Londo PD
20. Bashkim Fino PS
21. Bahri Kollçaku PD
22. Ben Blushi PS
23. Besnik Mustafaj PD
24. Brahim Bruka PD
25. Blendi Klosi PS
26. Dashamir Shehi PDR
27. Dilaver Qesja PD
28. Dritan Prifti PS
29. Durim Hushi PS
30. Edi Paloka PD
31. Eduart Alushi PS
32. Ejup Tabaku PS
33. Elida Tepelena PS
34. Elmaz Sherifi PS
35. Engjëll Bejtaj PSD
36. Eqerem Spahiu PD
37. Erjon Braçe PS
38. Et’hem Ruka PS
39. Ermelinda Meksi PS
40. Fatbardha Shabani PS
41. Fatmir Xhindi PS
42. Fatmir Mediu PR
43. Fatmir Xhafaj PS
44. Fatos Beja PD
45. Fatos Nano PS
46. Ferid Hoti PD
47. Flamur Dingo PS
48. Flamur Hoxha PS
49. Gani Hoxha PD
50. Gaqo Apostoli PSD
51. Gazmir Bizhga PS
52. Genc Pollo PDR
53. Gjergj Koja PS
54. Gjovalin Bzheta PD
55. Gramoz Ruçi PS
56. Hasan Hoxha PS
57. Ilir Bano PD
58. Ilir Gjoni PS
59. Ilir Meta PS
60. Ilir Zela PS
61. Ilirian Barzani PDR|
62. Jak Ndokaj PDR
63. Jemin Gjana PD
64. Jozefina Topalli PD
65. Kastriot Islami PS
66. Lekë Çukaj PS
67. Ligoraq Karamelo PBDNJ
68. Luan Memushi PS
69. Luan Rama PS
70. Luan Skuqi PD
71. Lufter Xhuveli PAA
72. Luigj Gjoka PD
73. Makbule Çeço PS
74. Maksim Begeja PD
75. Maksut Balla PS
76. Maqo Lakrori PS
77. Marieta Pronjari PD
78. Marko Bello PS
79. Mezan Malaj PS
80. Monika Kryemadhi PS
81. Muhamet Ukperaj PD
82. Musa Ulqini PS
83. Mustafa Muçi| PS
84. Mustafa Xhani PS
85. Namik Dokle PS
86. Nard Ndoka PDR
87. Nazmir Bilani PS
88. Ndre Legisi PS
89. Ndriçim Babasi PD
90. Ndriçim Hysa PS
91. Ndue Preka PAA
92. Neritan Alibali PD
93. Neritan Ceka AD
94. Nezir Selimaj PS
95. Niko Faber PS
96. Nikollë Lesi IND
97. Pal Dajçi PD
98. Pandeli Majko PS
99. Paskal Milo PSD
100. Pëllumb Berisha PD
101. Petro Koçi PS
102. Pjetër Arbnori PD
103. Preç Zogaj AD
104. Qazim Tepshi PDR
105. Rahmi Mehmetllari PS
106. Refet Dervina PAA
107. Ridvan Bode PD
108. Robert Çeku PD
109. Sabit Brokaj PS
110. Sadedin Balla PD
111. Saimir Curri PDR
112. Sali Berisha PD
113. Sali Shehu PD
114. Servet Pëllumbi PS
115. Shaban Memia PD
116. Shpëtim Kateshi PS
117. Shpëtim Roqi|PD
118. Shyqyri Duraku PS
119. Skënder Gjinushi PSD
120. Sokol Olldashi PD
121. Sotir Kokeri PS
122. Spartak Braho PS
123. Spartak Poçi PS
124. Stefan Çipa PS
125. Taulant Dedja PS
126. Teodor Laço PD
127. Limoz Dizdari PS
128. Uran Metko PD
129. Valentina Leskaj PS
130. Valentin Palaj PD
131. Vangjel Dule PBDNJ
132. Vangjel Tavo PS
133. Kristo Goci PBDNJ
134. Vath Koreshi PS
135. Viktor Doda PS
136. Vili Minarolli PD
137. Vladimir Malo PS
138. Ylli Bufi PS
139. Zef Gjoka PD
140. Zyhdi Pepa PS
