= Berisha I Government =

2005–2009 government of Albania

- 63rd Government of Albania

- Date formed: 11 September 2005
- Date dissolved: 17 September 2009

People and organisations
- President: Alfred Moisiu; Bamir Topi
- Chairperson: Jozefina Topalli
- Prime Minister: Sali Berisha
- Total no. of members: 140
- Member parties: PD, PR, PDK, PDR, PAA, PBDNJ, BLD
- Status in legislature: Coalition
- Opposition parties: PS, PSD, LSI, PDS, AD
- Opposition leader: Edi Rama

History
- Election: 2005 election
- Predecessor: Nano VI Government
- Successor: Berisha II Government

The first Government of Prime Minister Sali Berisha was the 63rd ruling Government of the Republic of Albania formed on 8 September 2005. Following the 3 July 2005 election, the Democratic Party formed a center-right post-electoral alliance to make a majority of seats to Parliament and form the government. The alliance consisted of five-center-right parties led by Sali Berisha managed to create a majority of 81 deputies out of 140 in the Assembly. The new government led by Sali Berisha was voted on 8 September with 84-votes Pro, and took oath on 11 September in the presence of the President of the Republic Alfred Moisiu.

== Cabinet ==
The table below shows the ministers of the Berisha I government starting from the day of the oath, on 11 September 2005 until the day of the replacement on 17 September 2009.

The first changes during the government came in 2007, when Sokol Olldashi resigned to run in the local elections against Edi Rama for the Municipality of Tirana. The post of Minister of Interior remained vacant for about two months and the functions of Minister were transferred to Deputy Minister Gjergj Lezhja, although the presidential decree for the dismissal of Mr. Olldashi was published in March alongside other changes. Then other changes came in March of the same year from where 6 ministers were replaced. While in early May, the Prime Minister Sali Berisha had a public conflict with the Minister of Foreign Affairs Besnik Mustafaj where they both had the debate in the PM's office. Lulzim Basha was appointed in his place, who previously held the position of Minister of Public Works, Transport and Telecommunications. While Olldashi is appointed to the vacancy left by Basha.

Cabinet members
Portfolio	Minister	Took office	Left office	Party
Prime Minister	Sali Berisha	11 September 2005	17 September 2009	PD
Deputy Prime Minister	Ilir Rusmali	11 September 2005	19 March 2007	PD
Deputy Prime Minister	Gazmend Oketa	20 March 2007	21 March 2008	PD
Deputy Prime Minister	Genc Pollo	30 July 2008	17 September 2009	PDR
Ministry of Finances	Ridvan Bode	11 September 2005	17 September 2009	PD
Ministry of Internal Affairs	Sokol Olldashi	11 September 2005	18 January 2007	PD
Ministry of Internal Affairs	vacant	18 January 2007	20 March 2007	
Ministry of Internal Affairs	Bujar Nishani	20 March 2007	17 September 2009	PD
Ministry of Defence	Fatmir Mediu	11 September 2005	21 March 2008	PR
Ministry of Defence	Gazmend Oketa	28 March 2008	17 September 2009	PD
Ministry of Foreign Affairs	Besnik Mustafaj	11 September 2005	30 April 2007	PD
Ministry of Foreign Affairs	Lulzim Basha	1 May 2007	17 September 2009	PD
Ministry of Integration	Arenca Trashani	11 September 2005	19 March 2007	PD
Ministry of Integration	Majlinda Bregu	20 March 2007	17 September 2009	PD
Ministry of Justice	Aldo Bumçi	11 September 2005	19 March 2007	PD
Ministry of Justice	Ilir Rusmali	20 March 2007	19 November 2007	PD
Ministry of Justice	Enkelejd Alibeaj	24 November 2007	17 September 2009	PD
Ministry of Public Works, Transport and Telecommunications	Lulzim Basha	11 September 2005	30 April 2007	PD
Ministry of Public Works, Transport and Telecommunications	Sokol Olldashi	1 May 2007	17 September 2009	PD
Ministry of Education and Science	Genc Pollo	11 September 2005	25 July 2008	PDR
Ministry of Education and Science	Fatos Beja	30 July 2008	17 September 2009	PD
Ministry of Economy, Trade and Energy	Genc Ruli	11 September 2005	17 September 2009	PD
Ministry of Health	Maksim Cikuli	11 September 2005	19 March 2007	PD
Ministry of Health	Nard Ndoka	20 March 2007	25 July 2008	PDK
Ministry of Health	Anila Godo	30 July 2008	17 September 2009	PR
Ministry of Agriculture, Food and Consumer Protection	Jemin Gjana	11 September 2005	17 September 2009	PD
Ministry of Tourism, Culture, Youth and Sports	Bujar Leskaj	11 September 2005	19 March 2007	PD
Ministry of Tourism, Culture, Youth and Sports	Ylli Pango	20 March 2007	3 March 2009	PD
Ministry of Tourism, Culture, Youth and Sports	Ardian Turku	17 March 2009	17 September 2009	PD
Ministry of Environment, Forests and Water Administration	Lufter Xhuveli	11 September 2005	17 September 2009	PAA
Ministry of Labor, Social Affairs and Equal Opportunities	Koço "Kosta" Barka	11 September 2005	2 October 2008	PBDNJ
Ministry of Labor, Social Affairs and Equal Opportunities	Anastas Duro	2 October 2008	14 May 2009	PBDNJ
Ministry of Labor, Social Affairs and Equal Opportunities	Viktor Gumi	14 May 2009	17 September 2009	PD

== See also ==
- Politics of Albania

Preceded by Nano IV	Government of Albania; 2005–2009	Succeeded by Berisha II
