= Berisha II Government =

Government of Albania (2009–2013)

- 64th Government of Albania

- 2nd Berisha Government
- Date formed: 17 September 2009
- Date dissolved: 15 September 2013

People and organisations
- President: Bamir Topi; Bujar Nishani
- Chairperson: Jozefina Topalli
- Prime Minister: Sali Berisha
- Total no. of members: 140
- Member parties: PD, LSI, PR, PDI
- Status in legislature: Coalition
- Opposition parties: PS, PBDNJ
- Opposition leader: Edi Rama

History
- Election: 2009 election
- Predecessor: Berisha I Government
- Successor: Rama I Government

In Albania the Berisha II Government was in office from 2009 to 2013. They were sworn in on 17 September 2009, replacing the Berisha I cabinet, which had been in office since 2005. They were followed by the Rama cabinet on September 15, 2013.

The coalition between the Democratic Party (PD), the Socialist Movement for Integration (LSI), the Republican Party (PR) and the Party for Justice, Integration and Unity (PDIU) formed the government cabinet. In September 2010, Minister of Economics Dritan Prifti and in January 2011, Prime Minister Ilir Meta, withdrew.

Shortly before the end of the reign, Sali Berisha had several LSI ministers in April 2013 through rights from her own party, since the LSI was involved in a coalition with the socialists in the election campaign. Which resulted in the LSI to pull out of Berisha's coalition. On 22 April 2013 the LSI would form an alliance with the Socialist Party of Albania for the 2013 elections.

== Cabinet ==
Cabinet members
Portfolio	Minister	Took office	Left office	Party
Prime Minister	Sali Berisha	17 September 2009	15 September 2013	PD
Deputy Prime Minister	Ilir Meta	17 September 2009	17 January 2011	LSI
Deputy Prime Minister	Edmond Haxhinasto	20 January 2011	3 April 2013	LSI
Deputy Prime Minister	Myqerem Tafaj	4 April 2013	15 September 2013	PD
Ministry of Finances	Ridvan Bode	17 September 2009	15 September 2013	PD
Ministry of Internal Affairs	Lulzim Basha	17 September 2009	21 April 2011	PD
Ministry of Internal Affairs	Bujar Nishani	25 April 2011	22 June 2012	PD
Ministry of Internal Affairs	Flamur Noka	3 July 2012	15 September 2013	PD
Ministry of Defence	Arben Imami	17 September 2009	15 September 2013	PD
Ministry of Foreign Affairs	Ilir Meta	17 September 2009	14 September 2010	LSI
Ministry of Foreign Affairs	Edmond Haxhinasto	17 September 2010	17 January 2011	LSI
Ministry of Foreign Affairs	Edmond Panariti	3 July 2012	3 April 2013	LSI
Ministry of Foreign Affairs	Aldo Bumçi	4 April 2013	15 September 2013	PD
Ministry of Integration	Majlinda Bregu	17 September 2009	15 September 2013	PD
Ministry of Justice	Bujar Nishani	17 September 2009	21 April 2011	PD
Ministry of Justice	Eduard Halimi	25 July 2011	15 September 2013	PD
Ministry of Public Works, Transport and Telecommunications; Ministry of Public Works and Transport from 15 April 2010 onward	Sokol Olldashi	17 September 2009 12 April 2010	12 April 2010 15 September 2013	PD
Ministry of Education and Science	Myqerem Tafaj	17 September 2009	15 September 2013	PD
Ministry of Economy, Trade and Energy	Dritan Prifti	17 September 2009	14 September 2010	LSI
Ministry of Economy, Trade and Energy	Ilir Meta	17 September 2010	17 January 2011	LSI
Ministry of Economy, Trade and Energy	Nasip Naço	20 January 2011	25 June 2012	LSI
Ministry of Economy, Trade and Energy	Edmond Haxhinasto	3 July 2012	3 April 2013	LSI
Ministry of Economy, Trade and Energy	Florjon Mima	4 April 2013	15 September 2013	PD
Ministry of Health	Petrit Vasili	17 September 2009	25 June 2012	LSI
Ministry of Health	Vangjel Tavo	3 July 2012	3 April 2013	LSI
Ministry of Health	Halim Kosova	4 April 2013	15 September 2013	PD
Ministry of Agriculture, Food and Consumer Protection	Genc Ruli	17 September 2009	15 September 2013	PD
Ministry of Tourism, Culture, Youth and Sports	Ferdinand Xhaferaj	17 September 2009	21 July 2011	PD
Ministry of Tourism, Culture, Youth and Sports	Aldo Bumçi	25 July 2011	3 April 2013	PD
Ministry of Tourism, Culture, Youth and Sports	Visar Zhiti	4 April 2013	15 September 2013	PD
Ministry of Environment, Forests and Water Administration	Fatmir Mediu	17 September 2009	15 September 2013	PR
Ministry of Labor, Social Affairs and Equal Opportunities	Spiro Ksera	17 September 2009	15 September 2013	PD
Minister of State for Reforms and Relations with the Assembly; It was abolished on 12 April 2010	Genc Pollo	17 September 2009	12 April 2010	PD
Minister for Innovation and Information Technology; Added as Minister without portfolio on 15 April 2010	Genc Pollo	15 April 2010	15 September 2013	PD

== See also ==
- Council of Ministers (Albania)

Preceded by Berisha I	Government of Albania; 2009–2013	Succeeded by Rama I
