= Majko II Government =

- 61st Government of Albania

- Date formed: 22 February 2002
- Date dissolved: 31 July 2002

People and organisations
- President: Rexhep Meidani; Alfred Moisiu
- Chairperson: Namik Dokle
- Prime Minister: Pandeli Majko
- Deputy Prime Minister: Skënder Gjinushi
- Total no. of members: 140
- Member parties: PS
- Status in legislature: Coalition
- Opposition parties: PD, PR
- Opposition leader: Sali Berisha

History
- Election: 2001 election
- Predecessor: Meta II Government
- Successor: Nano IV Government

The Majko II Government was the 61st ruling government of the Republic of Albania, led by prime minister Pandeli Majko. It was officially mandated by president Rexhep Meidani on 22 February 2002. After the 2001 parliamentary elections, the alliance led by the Socialist Party won a seat majority for the second consecutive time and managed to form a government headed by Ilir Meta but due to internal conflicts within the party, Meta was forced to offer his resignation on 29 January 2002. Majko managed to persuade most of the party hierarchy, including its chairman Fatos Nano, to form a new government, although as it turned out, for the same reasons as the Meta II Government, he offered his resignation a few months later on 25 July 2002.

== Overview ==
A few months after the formation of the Meta II Government, in the Socialist Party (PS), debates broke out between the incumbent Prime Minister and the party chairman, Mr. Fatos Nano. The conflict escalated in early December 2001 when the party chairman convened for three consecutive days the General Steering Committee of the Socialist Party or as it was otherwise known by the acronym KPD. In this committee, he accuses some ministers of the Meta government of being corrupt, incompetent, and not reflecting the will of the voters of PS. This led to the resignation of 4 ministers in those days, whom Meta replaced by taking the decree of the President a few days later, but Nano refused to give his consensus resulting in a non-vote on the parliament. President Meidani did not hesitate to take the case to the Constitutional Court and threatened to dissolve parliament.

However, in order to pave the way for a solution, Ilir Meta himself offered his resignation as Prime Minister on 29 January 2002. Nano, on the other hand, could not offer himself as a new candidate for Prime Minister because according to the statute of the Socialist Party, the role of PM and the party chairman could not be exercised simultaneously. Fearing the same situation as in Meta government and willing to consolidate his power in the party, he chose the latter instead of governing the country.

Majko, on the other hand, volunteered to govern the country for a second time, and given that he was a figure that found consensus from both factions in the party, he began working to form a new government trying to persuade both sides. This in fact suited Nano's situation, as it gave him time to start a process within the party to change the statute and allow him to exercise simultaneously the chairman and prime minister.

== Cabinet ==
Portfolio	Minister	Took office	Left office	Party
Prime Minister	Pandeli Majko	22 February 2002	25 July 2002	PS
Deputy Prime Minister	Skënder Gjinushi	22 February 2002	31 July 2002	PSD
Ministry of Finances	Kastriot Islami	22 February 2002	31 July 2002	PS
Ministry of Public Order	Stefan Çiba	22 February 2002	31 July 2002	PS
Ministry of Defence	Luan Rama	22 February 2002	31 July 2002	PS
Ministry of Foreign Affairs	Arta Dade	22 February 2002	31 July 2002	PS
Ministry of Justice	Spiro Peçi	22 February 2002	31 July 2002	Independent
Ministry of Economy	Ermelinda Meksi	22 February 2002	31 July 2002	PS
Ministry of Education and Science	Luan Memushi	22 February 2002	31 July 2002	PS
Ministry of Agriculture	Agron Duka	22 February 2002	31 July 2002	Independent
Ministry of Labour and Social Affairs	Skënder Gjinushi	22 February 2002	31 July 2002	PSD
Ministry of Health	Mustafa Xhani	22 February 2002	31 July 2002	PS
Ministry of Culture, Youth and Sports	Agron Tato	22 February 2002	31 July 2002	PS
Ministry of Environment	Lufter Xhuveli	22 February 2002	31 July 2002	PAA
Ministry of Transport	Maqo Lakrori	22 February 2002	31 July 2002	PS
Ministry of Industry and Energy	Viktor Doda	22 February 2002	31 July 2002	PS
Ministry of Economic Cooperation and Trade	Ermelinda Meksi	22 February 2002	31 July 2002	PS
Ministry of Local Government and Decentralization	Et’hem Ruka	22 February 2002	31 July 2002	PS
Minister of State for European Integration; As minister without portfolio	Marko Bello	22 February 2002	31 July 2002	PS
Minister of State; As minister without portfolio	Ndre Legisi	22 February 2002	31 July 2002	PS

== See also ==
- Politics of Albania
- Council of Ministers of Albania

== Sources ==
- Dervishi, Kastriot (2005), Historia e shtetit shqiptar 1912–2005: organizimi shtetëror, jeta politike, ngjarjet kryesore, të gjithë ligjvënësit, ministrat dhe kryetarët e shtetit shqiptar në historinë 93-vjeçare të tij (in Albanian), Shtëpia Botuese 55, OCLC 123286739
- "Official Gazette of the Republic of Albania". Center of Official Publications (in Albanian).
