= 2007 Albanian local elections =

- 4 February 2007

Local elections were held in Albania on 18 February 2007. They came after threats to boycott the elections by opposition parties because of accusations over fraudulent voting rolls; because of this, the elections were rescheduled from 20 January 2007 to the new date on very short notice, a move which was criticized by observers. The elections were seen as crucial to the future of Albanian integration with the European Union.

The leftist opposition, led by Edi Rama's Socialist Party of Albania, won in the majority of the 384 municipalities, including the major cities of Tirana, Durrës, Fier, Elbasan, Korçë, Berat, Gjirokastër and Vlorë; the only major city won by the rightist government was Shkodër.

Despite improvements, observers from the Organization for Security and Co-operation in Europe, the Council of Europe and the European Union criticised that "shortcomings in the preparation and conduct of these elections reflect the need for improved cross-party co-operation to fulfill Albania's international commitments".

== Parties and coalitions ==
At the time of the election the parties consisted of the Democratic part and the Socialist Party the two largest parties. This would be the first time Edi Rama would be the leader of the Socialist party of Albania following Fatos Nanos resigning from the party. The Democrats and Socialists both had their own alliances.

Party	Acronym	Chairman
Democratic Party of Albania	PD	Sali Berisha
Socialist Party of Albania	PS	Edi Rama
Independents	–	–
Unity for Human Rights Party	PBDNJ	Vangjel Dule
Socialist Movement for Integration	LSI	Ilir Meta
Republican Party of Albania	PR	Fatmir Mediu
New Democratic Party	PDR	Genc Pollo
Demochristian Party of Albania	PDK	Nard Ndoka
Social Democratic Party of Albania	PSD	Skender Gjinushi
Agrarian Party of Albania	PAA	Lufter Xhuveli
Democratic Alliance Party	AD	Neritan Ceka
Social Democracy Party of Albania	PDS	Paskal Milo
Movement for National Development	LZHK	Dashamir Shehi
Legality Movement Party	PLL	Ekrem Spahiu
Liberal Democratic Union	BLD	Arian Starova
Albanian National Front Party	PBK	Adriatik Alimadhi
Party for Justice and Integration	PDI	Tahir Muhedini
Communist Party of Albania	PKSH	Hysni Milloshi
Democratic National Front Party	PBKD	Artur Roshi
Albanian Democratic Union Party	PBDSH	Ylber Valteri
Party Movement for Human Rights and Freedoms	LDLNJ	Ligoraq Karamelo
Right Liberal Opinion Party	PMDL	Mustafa Lici
Green Party of Albania	PGJSH	Edlir Petanaj
Macedonian Alliance for European Integration	AMIE	Edmond Temelko
Albanian Affairs Party	PÇSH	Bujar Shurdhi
National Unity Party	PUK	Idajet Beqiri
Albanian Communist Party November 8	PKSH 8 Nëntori	Preng Çuni
New European Democracy Party	PDRESH	Koçi Tahiri
The Party of Denied Rights	PDM	Ilir Vata
Socialist Alliance Party of Albania	PASSH	Rasim Mulgeci
Albanian Future Party	PASH	Emin Subashi
Party of Democratic Reforms	PRDSH	Skënder Halili
Albanian Labor Movement Party	PLPSH	Shefqet Musaraj
National Reconciliation Party	PPK	Spartak Dobi
Social Christian Party of Albania	PSKSH	Fran Bruka
Albanian Democratic Monarchist Movement Party	PLMDSH	Guri Durollari
Environmentalist Party	PA	Nasi Bozheku
Democratic Party New Democracy and Albanian Right	PDDRDSH	Petrit Kallçishta
Democratic Renewal Party	PDRn	Dashamir Shehi
Albanian National Union Party	PBKSH	Henry Perolli
Albanian Conservative Party	Pkons	Kujtim Gjuzi
Albanian Emigration Party	PESH	Kostaq Papa
Peze Gjirokastër Democratic Party of Albania	PDPGJSH	Fetah Dedej

== Results ==
Following the full counting of every zone. The Democrats + allied parties received at least 47.86%. Although retaining the most percentage at the time Edi Rama had still remained the winner in Tirana as Mayor which he held the position up until 2011 when he was defeated as mayor of Tirana by Lulzim Basha.

Number	Party/Alliance	Votes	Percentage of Votes
1	Democratic Party + Allied	629,229	47.86%
2	Socialist Party + Allied	575,068	43.74%
3	Independents	58,717	4.47%
4	Unity for Human Rights Party	32,496	2.47%
5	Socialist Movement for Integration	6,355	0.48%
6	Communist Party of Albania	3,447	0.26%
7	Liberal Democratic Union + PD	1,842	0.14%
8	Social Democracy Party of Albania	1,650	0.13%
9	Democratic National Front Party	1,317	0.10%
10	Party Movement for Human Rights and Freedoms	994	0.08%
11	Party for Justice and Integration	682	0.05%
12	Albanian Affairs Party	547	0.04%
13	Right Liberal Opinion Party	544	0.04%
14	Legality Movement Party	498	0.04%
15	Albanian Future Party	322	0.02%
16	Albanian Democratic Monarchist Movement Party	185	0.01%
17	The Party of Denied Rights	177	0.01%
18	Social Democratic Party of Albania	176	0.01%
19	Party of Democratic Reforms	131	0.01%
20	Socialist Alliance Party of Albania	101	0.01%
21	New European Democracy Party	72	0.01%
22	National Reconciliation Party	54	0.00%
23	National Unity Party	29	0.00%

== See also ==
- 2011 Albanian local elections
