= Meta II Government =

- 60th Government of Albania

- Date formed: 7 September 2001
- Date dissolved: 22 February 2002

People and organisations
- President: Rexhep Mejdani
- Chairperson: Namik Dokle
- Prime Minister: Ilir Meta
- Deputy Prime Minister: Skënder Gjinushi
- Total no. of members: 140
- Member parties: PS
- Status in legislature: Coalition
- Opposition parties: PD, PR
- Opposition leader: Sali Berisha

History
- Election: 2001 election
- Predecessor: Meta I Government
- Successor: Majko II Government

The Second Government of the Prime Minister Ilir Meta was the 60th Government of the Republic of Albania which was officially mandated by President Rexhep Meidani on 7 September 2001. After the 2001 election, the alliance led by the Socialist Party won the majority for the second time in a row and managed to create a post–electoral coalition of 86 seats in Parliament to form the new government.

== History ==
After the elections of 24 June 2001, the coalition of the Socialist Party managed to create a consensus to reconfirm Mr.Ilir Meta as the next Prime Minister. On 7 September 2001, the government proposed by the coalition was officially decreed by the President. The oath was taken on the same day in the Presidential Palace. After the constitution of the new parliament, as it was foreseen the presentation of the governing program should be done in the first weeks of September following the oath of the new deputies, the election of the Speaker of Parliament but also the constitution of its bodies, however in the 11 September session, the Speaker of the newly elected of parliament announced with a trembling voice that a terrorist attack had taken place in the United States where several planes had hit various buildings in that state.

"I want to express the strongest condemnation against these bandit acts. At the same time I want to express the strong solidarity of the Albanian Parliament with the United States of America. This is a solidarity that stems from the friendship of the Albanian people with the American people, "It is a solidarity that stems from the admiration of the Albanian people for the American government. Expressing this solidarity, I think we should interrupt the session, so that the members of the assembly can follow the developments of this serious event," said the then Speaker of the Assembly, Namik Dokle.

A few minutes after the dissolution of the parliament, Prime Minister Ilir Meta, after consultation with the chairman of the Socialist Party, Fatos Nano, announced the reason for the postponement of the parliamentary session, while expressing his condolences for the tragedy that was happening. Meanwhile, lawmakers gathered near Mother Teresa Square to light candles for the victims of the World Trade Center towers in New York.

=== Internal clashes and resignation ===
The government itself was characterized by instability and strong criticism within it from the first days of its formation. This conflict came as a result of the duality between the chairman of the socialist party Fatos Nano and the incumbent prime minister Ilir Meta, escalating in the General Steering Committee of the Socialist Party held between 3 December and 5 December 2001, from where the chairman of the party attacked some ministers as corrupt, incompetent, and that they do not reflect the will of the voters of this party. During this meeting 4 ministers offered their resignation, they were: Anastas Angjeli, Mustafa Muçi, Bashkim Fino, and a few days later also Agron Duka.

On 10 December 2001, Prime Minister Meta proposed to the leadership of the Socialist Party the replacement ministers, names that did not find a consensus of the leadership of the party. However, Meta ignored the decision and on 14 December addressed President Meidani for their decree, which the latter did on the same day.

However, the internal clashes continued even at the beginning of the new year and this forced Ilir Mete to resign from the leadership of the government on 29 January 2002.

== Cabinet ==
After the 2001 elections, the Socialist Party (PS) decided to run without coalition and managed to secure 73 seats. Although capable of forming a government with such number of deputies, the aim was to create an even more stable government with the objective of electing the next president of the country for which 60% of the votes of the Parliament was needed. Thus in a post-election agreement, PS managed to form a government in addition to the Social Democratic Party which was a traditional ally, also with the Unity for Human Rights Party, the Agrarian Party, and the Democratic Alliance Party. The latter was a center-right party whose members were founders and former allies of the Democratic Party.

Portfolio	Minister	Took office	Left office	Party
Prime Minister	Ilir Meta	9 September 2001	22 February 2002	PS
Deputy Prime Minister	Skënder Gjinushi	9 September 2001	22 February 2002	PSD
Ministry of Finances	Anastas Angjeli	9 September 2001	4 December 2001	PS
Ministry of Finances	Gjergj Teneqexhiu	14 December 2001	22 February 2002	PS
Ministry of Public Order	Ilir Gjoni	9 September 2001	22 February 2002	PS
Ministry of Defence	Pandeli Majko	9 September 2001	22 February 2002	PS
Ministry of Foreign Affairs	Arta Dade	9 September 2001	22 February 2002	PS
Ministry of Justice	Sokol Nako	9 September 2001	22 February 2002	PS
Ministry of Public Economy and Privatization	Mustafa Muçi	9 September 2001	4 December 2001	PS
Ministry of Public Economy and Privatization	Spartak Poçi	14 December 2001	22 February 2002	PS
Ministry of Education and Science	Ben Blushi	9 September 2001	22 February 2002	PS
Ministry of Agriculture and Rural Development	Agron Duka	9 September 2001	5 December 2001	PS
Ministry of Agriculture and Rural Development	Eduard Allushi	14 December 2001	22 February 2002	PS
Ministry of Health	Gjergj Koja	9 September 2001	22 February 2002	PS
Ministry of Culture, Youth and Sports	Luan Rama	9 September 2001	22 February 2002	PS
Ministry of Environment	Et’hem Ruka	9 September 2001	22 February 2002	PS
Ministry of Transport	Maqo Lakrori	9 September 2001	22 February 2002	PS
Ministry of Public Works and Tourism	Bashkim Fino	9 September 2001	4 December 2001	PS
Ministry of Public Works and Tourism	Blendi Klosi	14 December 2001	22 February 2002	PS
Ministry of Economic Cooperation and Trade	Ermelinda Meksi	9 September 2001	22 February 2002	PS
Ministry of Local Government and Decentralization	Arben Imami	9 September 2001	22 February 2002	AD
Minister of State for European Integration; As minister without portfolio	Paskal Milo	9 September 2001	22 February 2002	PDS
Minister of State for Energy; As minister without portfolio	Dritan Prifti	9 September 2001	22 February 2002	PS
Minister of State; As minister without portfolio	Lufter Xhuveli	9 September 2001	22 February 2002	PAA
Minister of State; As minister without portfolio	Ndre Legisi	9 September 2001	22 February 2002	PS
Minister of State; As minister without portfolio	Niko Kacalidha	9 September 2001	22 February 2002	PS

== See also ==
- Politics of Albania
- Council of Ministers of Albania
