= Political Academy of the Socialist Party of Albania =

- Other names: AP
- Motto: "Njerëzit që ecin përpara sot në botë janë ata që kërkojnë ato kushte apo rrethana që ata duan dhe nëse nuk i gjejnë, këto kushte të përshtatshme i bëjnë ata vetë. Ju jeni njëri prej tyre". (in Albanian)
- Motto in English: People who get ahead in the world today are those that require such conditions or circumstances they want and if you do not find these favorable conditions make them yourself. You're one of them
- Type: National academy
- Affiliations: Socialist Party of Albania; Friedrich Ebert Foundation; Party of European Socialists; Qemal Stafa Foundation; Mediterranean University of Albania
- President: Prof. Maqo Lakrori
- Academic staff: +50
- Undergraduates: around 400
- Postgraduates: 37
- Location: Municipality of Golem, Kavajë District, Tirana County, Albania
- Campus: Hotel AS
- Colors: Red and black
- Nickname: Akademia Politike
- Website: www.akademiapolitike.com

The Political Academy of the Socialist Party of Albania or simply Political Academy (Albanian: Akademia Politike e Partisë Socialiste; short: AP) is the first academy of modern left-wing leadership in Albania. It is an academy established by the Socialist Party of Albania and the contribution of the Friedrich Ebert Foundation. The academy holds its lectures in Golem, near Durrës.

== Staff and lecturers ==
Political Academy staff consists of professors and professionals. Lecturers are politicians, parliamentarians, leaders, diplomats, university professors and analysts, scholars and journalists.

Some of the lecturers of Political Academy are:

- Alfred Moisiu, was the fourth President of the Republic of Albania
- Servet Pëllumbi, was Chairman of the Parliament of Albania
- Namik Dokle, was Chairman of the Parliament of Albania
- Arben Malaj, Minister of Finance and Economy of Albania 1997 - 2005
- Paskal Milo, Albanian historian, politician, and leader of the Social Democracy Party of Albania
- Shkëlqim Cani, former Governor of the Bank of Albania
- Pëllumb Xhufi, historian and former Vice Chairman of Socialist Movement for Integration
- Arta Dade, former Minister of Foreign Affairs of Albania, now Member of the Socialist Party of Albania to the Parliament of Albania
- Ermelinda Meksi, former Member of the Socialist Party of Albania to the Parliament of Albania, now member of the executive board of the Bank of Albania
- Mimi Kodheli, Member of the Socialist Party of Albania to the Parliament of Albania
- Gramoz Ruçi, Chairman of the parliamentary group of Socialist Party of Albania
- Valentina Leskaj, Member of the Socialist Party of Albania to the Parliament of Albania
- Preç Zogaj, former Member of the Democratic Party of Albania to the Parliament of Albania
- Erion Braçe, Member of the Socialist Party of Albania to the Parliament of Albania
- Fatmir Xhafaj, Member of the Socialist Party of Albania to the Parliament of Albania
- Ditmir Bushati, Member of the Socialist Party of Albania to the Parliament of Albania
- Taulant Balla, Member of the Socialist Party of Albania to the Parliament of Albania
- Et'hem Ruka, Member of the Socialist Party of Albania to the Parliament of Albania and former Minister of Environment
- Ben Blushi, Member of the Socialist Party of Albania to the Parliament of Albania and former Minister of State, Local Government and Decentralization of Albania
- Blendi Klosi, Member of the Socialist Party of Albania to the Parliament of Albania
- Luan Hajdaraga, former Minister of Interior of Albania
- Lisien Bashkurti, former Albanian Ambassador to Hungary, Deputy Chairman of the Red and Black Alliance
- Henri Çili, creator of European University of Tirana
- Ilir Zela, creator of FRESH
- Musa Ulqini, former Member of the Socialist Party of Albania to the Parliament of Albania
- Lorenc Vangjeli, journalist
- Luan Omari, jurist
- Maqo Lakrori
- Përparim Kabo
- Adriana Berberi
- Majlinda Dhuka
- Bashkim Rama
- Endri Fuga
- Elteva Bisha
- Genci Gjonçaj

== AP Program ==
The knowledge acquired will enable students:

- to be involved directly in decision-making processes and political functioning of the Socialist Party and the Socialist Party Parliamentary Group;
- To understand Albania's problems in the political, economic and social;
- Put into practice their knowledge by proposing solutions to problems;
- Suggest ways to accelerate the pace of development;
- Engage in political processes of decision making in local and national level.

== Activities ==
The method of teaching includes discourse, dialogue and interactive learning, debate, group work, case studies, role plays, presentations, and incentives.

== See also ==
- Friedrich Ebert Foundation
- Socialist Party of Albania
