= Democratic Renovation Party =

Democratic Renovation Party may refer to:

- Democratic Renovation Party (Cape Verde)
- Democratic Renovation Party (São Tomé and Príncipe)

== See also ==
- Democratic Renewal Party (disambiguation)
