= Vangjush =

Vangjush is a given name. Notable people with the name include:

- Vangjush Dako (born 1966), Albanian politician
- Vangjush Mio (1891–1957), Albanian painter
