= Ministry of Environment (Albania) =

Government ministry of Albania

- Ministria e Mjedisit

Department overview
- Formed: 13 April 1992; 34 years ago
- Jurisdiction: Council of Ministers
- Headquarters: Tirana, Albania

The Ministry of Environment (Albanian: Ministria e Mjedisit) is the department of the Government of Albania responsible for developing the government policy on prevention of pollution, protecting the natural heritage, biodiversity, forests, sea, water and energy.

In September 2025, the department split from the Ministry of Tourism and Environment and became an independent ministry once again. The current officeholder is Sofjan Jaupaj.

== History ==
The Department of Environment was first established on 13 April 1992, in what is called the first Meksi I Government, where together with that department of Health they created the Ministry of Health and Environment. This came as a need for better management of natural resources, protection of forests, and better management of waste and natural pollution. Also with the establishment of the capitalist system in the country, the need for a special department that would give permissions for the use of natural and mineral resources became even greater until in 2001, while in the new Meta Government this department became a separate ministry and was considered one of the most important government ministries as it depended on functions directly related to the livelihood of the population. Such as environmental pollution, management of protected areas, forest management, air, water, and acoustic pollution, and many others. Today this department has joined the Department of Tourism by forming the Ministry of Tourism and Environment by linking two of the areas that according to Prime Minister Edi Rama are inseparable from each other in terms of objectives set by his government.

=== Reorganization ===
- Ministry of Agriculture and Forestry (1928–1966)
- Ministry of Health and Environment (1992–1998)
- Ministry of Environment (2001–2005)
- Ministry of Environment, Forests and Water Administration (2005–2009)
- Ministry of Environment (2013–2017)
- Ministry of Tourism and Environment (2017–2025)
- Ministry of Environment (2025 - present)

== Officeholders (1928–present) ==
No.	Name	Term in office
Ministrat e Pyjeve (1928–1966)
1	Ferid Vokopola	11 May 1928	20 June 1928
2	Musa Juka	20 June 1928	5 March 1930
3	Jakov Milaj	12 February 1943	28 April 1943
4	Gaqo Tashko	5 July 1950	31 July 1953
5	Peti Shamblli	17 March 1966	13 September 1966
Ministrat e Mjedisit (1992–present)
*	Flamur Hoxha	11 May 1991	4 June 1991
6	Tritan Shehu	13 April 1992	14 January 1994
7	Maksim Cikuli	14 January 1994	1 March 1997
8	Astrit Kalenja	11 March 1997	27 July 1997
9	Leonard Solis	27 July 1997	2 October 1998
10	Et’hem Ruka	7 September 2001	22 February 2002
11	Lufter Xhuveli	31 July 2002	29 December 2003
–	Et’hem Ruka	29 December 2003	11 September 2005
–	Lufter Xhuveli	11 September 2005	17 September 2009
12	Fatmir Mediu	17 September 2009	15 September 2013
13	Lefter Koka	15 September 2013	13 September 2017
14	Blendi Klosi	13 September 2017	18 September 2021
15	Mirela Kumbaro	18 September 2021	12 September 2025
16	Sofjan Jaupaj	12 September 2025	incumbent

== See also ==
- Environment of Albania

== Sources ==
- Dervishi, Kastriot (2005), Historia e shtetit shqiptar 1912–2005: organizimi shtetëror, jeta politike, ngjarjet kryesore, të gjithë ligjvënësit, ministrat dhe kryetarët e shtetit shqiptar në historinë 93-vjeçare të tij (in Albanian), Shtëpia Botuese 55, OCLC 123286739
- "Official Gazette of the Republic of Albania". Center of Official Publications (in Albanian).
