= National Environment Agency (Albania) =

Government agency of Albania

- Agjencia Kombëtare e Mjedisit
- Logo of National Environment Agency

Environment agency overview
- Formed: 29 January 2014
- Preceding Environment agency: Environment and Forestry Agency
- Jurisdiction: Albania
- Headquarters: Tirana
- Environment agency executive: Arta Dollani, Director General
- Website: akm.gov.al

The National Environment Agency (Albanian: Agjencia Kombëtare e Mjedisit (AKM)) is a government agency in Albania under the supervision of the Ministry of Tourism and Environment. Before 2014 the agency was known as The Environment and Forestry Agency.

AKM is dedicated to improving, conserving and promoting the country's environment and striving for environmentally sustainable development with sound, efficient resource management.

== History ==
The National Environmental Agency, together with the State Inspectoriate of Forestry and Water Environment was established on 29 January 2014 with the proposal of Minister Lefter Koka, by abolishing the former Environmental and Forestry Agency.
