= Ministry of Labour and Social Affairs (Albania) =

Government ministry in Albania

- Ministria e Punës dhe Çështjeve Sociale

Department overview
- Formed: 13 January 1945
- Preceding Department: Ministry of Social Welfare and Youth
- Dissolved: 13 September 2017
- Superseding Department: Ministry of Health and Social Protection
- Jurisdiction: Council of Ministers
- Status: Dissolved
- Headquarters: Tirana, Albania

The Ministry of Labour and Social Affairs (Albanian: Ministria e Punës dhe Çështjeve Sociale) was a department of the Albanian Government charged with the responsibility to protect and safeguard the interest of workers in general and the poor, deprived and disadvantaged sections of the society. The Ministry was dissolved on 13 September 2017 and its departments were merged with other ministries. Most of its functions are now performed by the Ministry of Health and Social Protection.

== History ==
It was first established on 13 January 1945 by the first Communist government that emerged from that year's elections under the name of the Ministry of Social Assistance.

Since the establishment of the institution, the Ministry of Labor and Social Affairs has been reorganized by joining other departments or merging with other ministries, thus making its name change several times. This list reflects the changes made since 1992:

- Ministry of Social Assistance (Ministria e Asistencës Sociale)
- Ministry of Labor, Immigration, Social Assistance and former Political Persecuted (Ministria e Punës, Emigracionit, Përkrahjes sociale dhe ish të Përndjekurve Politikë) from 1992 to 1996
- Ministry of Labor and Social Affairs (Ministria e Punës dhe e Çështjeve Sociale) from 1996 to 2002 (dissolved)
- Ministry of Labor and Social Affairs (Ministria e Punës dhe e Çështjeve Sociale) from 2003 (re-established) to 2005
- Ministry of Labor, Social Affairs and Equal Opportunities (Ministria e Punës, Çështjeve Sociale dhe Shanseve të Barabarta) from 2005 to 2013
- Ministry of Social Welfare and Youth (Ministria e Mirëqenies Sociale dhe Rinisë) from 2013 to 2017 (dissolved)

The ministry was dissolved in September 2017. The department of labour and social affairs was merged with the Ministry of Health and Social Protection, while the Youth Department joined the Ministry of Education, Sports and Youth.

== Officeholders (1945–2017) ==
No.	Name	Term in office
1	Bedri Spahiu	13 January 1945	21 March 1946
2	Theodhori Bej	11 May 1991	4 June 1991
3	Dashamir Shehi	13 April 1992	3 December 1994
4	Engjëll Dakli	9 December 1994	10 July 1996
5	Arlinda Keçi	11 July 1996	1 March 1997
6	Elmaz Sherifi	11 March 1997	23 April 1998
7	Anastas Angjeli	24 April 1998	27 September 1998
8	Kadri Rrapi	2 October 1998	25 October 1999
9	Makbule Çeço	28 October 1999	6 September 2001
10	Skënder Gjinushi	6 September 2001	25 July 2002
11	Valentina Leskaj	29 July 2002	29 December 2003
12	Engjëll Bejtaj	29 December 2003	10 September 2005
13	Koço Barka	10 September 2005	6 October 2008
14	Anastas Duro	6 October 2008	15 May 2009
15	Viktor Gumi	15 May 2009	8 September 2009
16	Spiro Ksera	9 September 2009	15 September 2013
17	Erion Veliaj	15 September 2013	11 May 2015
18	Blendi Klosi	26 May 2015	19 March 2017
19	Olta Xhaçka	24 March 2017	22 May 2017
20	Xhulieta Kërtusha	22 May 2017	13 September 2017
