= National Forestry Agency =

Government agency of Albania

National Forestry Agency Albania
- Agjencia Kombëtare e Pyjeve

Government agency overview
- Formed: 17 July 2019 (7 years ago)
- Jurisdiction: Council of Ministers
- Headquarters: Tirana, Albania
- Minister responsible: Mirela Kumbaro, Ministry of Tourism and Environment
- Government agency executive: Artur Kala, Director General
- Website: akpyje.gov.al

The National Forestry Agency (Albanian: Agjencia Kombëtare e Pyjeve – AKP) is an agency of the Albanian government responsible for overseeing the management of forests, their preservation and development and the sustainable and multifunctional use of forest resources in Albania as natural assets of national importance. The agency is a subordinate institution of the Ministry of Tourism and Environment.

== Overview ==
The National Forestry Agency (NFA) was established on 17 July 2019, pursuant to Article 100 of the Constitution and Article 6 of Law no. 90/2012, "On the organization and operation of the state administration", following the proposal of the Minister of Tourism and Environment Blendi Klosi. The agency is a public budgetary legal entity, under the supervision of the ministry responsible for the environment, with headquarters in Tirana and is financed primarily by the state budget and from other legal sources.

National Forest Agency's mission is the management of the forests of Albania, their development and conservation, sustainable utilization of forestry resources as a natural resource of national importance.

National forest Agency is responsible for the following:

- Provide performance in the forestry sector;
- Assessment of forest state;
- Organization of operation on inventory and research in the forestry field;
- Organization of the work on drafting documents relating forest management;
- Organization of work for forest monitoring and control.

Relating to the performance, research and management in the forestry field, NFA has the following tasks:

1. Defines norms, standards, methodologies, guidelines, regulations, requirements, criteria and unified practices for the conservation, use/utilization, rehabilitation and improvement of forest resources and sylvicultural elements, cooperating according to the law with any responsible ministry or institution and in accordance with the requirements for EU integration.
2. Draft and maintain database, documents, manuals, plans, techniques and reports;
3. Assess the forest state and forest indicators in national level of sylvicultural indicators of genetic resources, agroforestry, land use, biodiversity and forest and pastures health;
4. Implements and monitors plans, programs and projects aimed at well managing, conservation and development of the forest fund, in cooperation and coordination with institutions at the central and local level, with donors/partners.
5. Monitors and controls the activity of the forest administration and inspection structures in the local self-government units, in terms of implementation and compliance with the legislation in force and the approved plans, which intervene to take mandatory measures in cases where violations or avoidance of their content and requests.
6. Monitors and controls the implementation of the conditions and criteria defined in the permits/authorizations granted for the use of forests.
7. Monitors and controls the rights granted by local self-government units to public or private operators, for the use of the forest fund, in terms of compliance and compliance with the criteria, requirements, limitations and recommendations identified in the forest management plans.
8. Implements the national program for monitoring short-term, medium-term and long-term indicators in the field of forests, pastures, medicinal plants, their biodiversity, climate change and biomass, in accordance with the legal acts in force, and in close cooperation with central and local government units and interested third parties.
