= State Social Service (Albania) =

Government agency of Albania

- Shërbimi Social Shtetëror
- Official logo

Social services agency overview
- Formed: 8 January 1996
- Jurisdiction: Albania
- Headquarters: Tirana
- Social services agency executive: Reme Xholi, Director General
- Parent department: Ministry of Health and Social Protection
- Website: www.sherbimisocial.gov.al

The State Social Service (SHSSH) (Albanian: Shërbimi Social Shtetëror) is a government agency in Albania whose mission is to implement policies, legislation on economic assistance, as well as to ensure the coverage of wages and social services for the disabled through its network of 28 social care institutions and 12 regional centers around the country.

== Directors General Over the Years ==
- Vilma Kolpea
- Zenel Shalari
- Zamira Sinoimeri
- Natasha Hodaj
- Thanas Poçi
- Vilma Premti
- Mihal Naço
- Kozeta Mesiti
- Ilirjan Cuko
- Etleva Bisha
- Luneda Sufali
- Reme Xholi
