= Klodiana Spahiu =

Albanian politician and cardiologist (born 1973)

Minister of Health and Social Welfare
- Incumbent
- Assumed office 3 September 2026
- President: Bajram Begaj
- Prime Minister: Edi Rama
- Preceded by: Evis Sala

Member of the Parliament of Albania
- Incumbent
- Assumed office 2009
- Constituency: Durrës

Personal details
- Born: 22 May 1973 (age 53) Durrës, PSR Albania
- Party: Socialist Party of Albania
- Education: University of Tirana, Faculty of Medicine
- Profession: Physician, cardiologist, politician

Klodiana Spahiu (born 22 May 1973) is an Albanian physician, cardiologist and politician. A member of the Socialist Party of Albania, she has been a member of the Parliament of Albania since 2009 and has served as Deputy Speaker of the Parliament. On 3 September 2026, Prime Minister Edi Rama selected her as Minister of Health and Social Welfare of Albania, succeeding Evis Sala.

== Academic and professional career ==
Spahiu was born in Durrës on 22 May 1973. She graduated in General Medicine from the Faculty of Medicine of the University of Tirana in 1997. From 1998 to 2002, she specialized in cardiology at the University Hospital Center "Mother Teresa" in Tirana. She later completed training in non-invasive cardiology at the Agostino Gemelli University Polyclinic in Rome, Italy.

In 2003–2004, Spahiu completed postgraduate studies at the Faculty of Medicine of the University of Tirana. In 2005, she completed further training in invasive cardiology at Santa Chiara Hospital in Pisa, Italy. From 2012 to 2014, she completed a professional master's degree in health management. She holds the title of Doctor of Medical Sciences.

Spahiu worked at the University Hospital Center "Mother Teresa" in Tirana and at Durrës Hospital, where she worked as a cardiologist and later served as hospital director.

She has also taught at the University of Tirana, UFO University and the University "Our Lady of Good Counsel" in Tirana.

== Political career ==
Spahiu was elected to the Parliament of Albania in 2009 as a representative of the Socialist Party of Albania. She has served on parliamentary committees and participated in parliamentary friendship groups.

She served as Deputy Speaker of the Parliament of Albania. In May 2026, she represented the Albanian Parliament at a meeting with the Speaker of the Parliament of Georgia.

== Minister of Health and Social Welfare ==
On 3 September 2026, Prime Minister Edi Rama selected Spahiu as Minister of Health and Social Welfare, succeeding Evis Sala, who resigned on 2 September 2026.
