= Edmond Haxhinasto =

Albanian politician (born 1966)

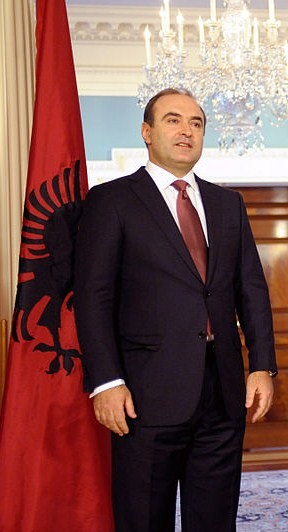

Member of the Albanian Parliament for Elbasan
- In office 9 September 2017 – 18 February 2019

Minister of Transportation and Infrastructure
- In office 15 September 2013 – 9 September 2016
- Prime Minister: Edi Rama
- Preceded by: Sokol Olldashi
- Succeeded by: Sokol Dervishaj

Deputy Prime Minister of Albania
- In office 17 January 2011 – 4 April 2013
- Prime Minister: Sali Berisha
- Preceded by: Ilir Meta
- Succeeded by: Myqerem Tafaj

Minister of Foreign Affairs
- In office 16 September 2010 – 27 June 2012
- Prime Minister: Sali Berisha
- Preceded by: Ilir Meta
- Succeeded by: Edmond Panariti

Minister of Economy, Trade and Energy
- In office 27 June 2012 – 4 April 2013
- Prime Minister: Sali Berisha
- Succeeded by: Florjon Mima

Personal details
- Born: 16 November 1966 (age 59) Tirana, Albania
- Party: Socialist Movement for Integration
- Education: University of Tirana; Woodrow Wilson School of Public and International Affairs (MPP) (Note: Acronym preferred by the Woodrow Wilson School)

Edmond Haxhinasto (born 16 November 1966) is an Albanian politician. He was Deputy Prime Minister of Albania from 2011 to 2013.

== Early life and education ==
Edmond Haxhinasto was born in Tirana on 16 November 1966. Haxhinasto graduated from the University of Tirana, Faculty of History and Philology, English Chair in 1989 with a Diploma in English. His postgraduate education includes a Master of Business Administration from the International Executive Center, Brdo, Slovenia in 1996. In 2000, he completed a Master of Public Policy from the Woodrow Wilson School of Public and International Affairs at Princeton University.

== Career ==
After a brief engagement in educational and national youth organizations, he worked as Head of Foreign Relations at the Parliament of the Republic of Albania from September 1991 to July 1992. From 1993 to 1997 he was engaged in the private sector.

From August 1997 to July 1999, he served at the Office of the Prime Minister as Head of the Coordination Department. He was also the Government Representative for the Emergency Management Group set up to manage the situation of Kosovan refugees in Albania.

In 1998, he was Chair of the Anti-Corruption Monitoring Group, in charge of monitoring the implementation of the Government's plan to combat corruption in Albania.

== Foreign minister ==
On 16 September 2010, Haxhinasto was appointed Minister of Foreign Affairs. On 29 March 2011, Haxhinasto attended the London Conference on Libya.

== Timeline ==
- From July 2000 to October 2001 served as Diplomatic Advisor to the Prime Minister.
- From November 2001 to July 2002 served as Charge d’ Affairs e.p. at the Albanian Embassy in Belgrade.
- From August 2002 – September 2003 worked as Chief of Cabinet at the Ministry of Foreign Affairs.
- From April 2004 to May 2005 was Advisor to Mr. Ilir Meta, in his capacity as Member of the International Commission on the Balkans.
- In February 2004 became Co-Founder of the Institute for Peace, Development and Integration.
- From 2004 has held the post of International Secretary, Head of National Committee and Vice-Chairman of the Socialist Movement for Integration (LSI).
- From October 2009 to September 2010 served as Deputy Minister of Public Works and Transport.
- From 16 September 2010 to 2012 he held the post of Minister of Foreign Affairs.
- From 17 January 2011 to 4 April 2013 he held the position of the Deputy Prime Minister and Minister of Foreign Affairs.
- From 15 September 2013 to 9 September 2016 he held the position of Minister of Transportation and Infrastructure.
