= National Tourism Agency (Albania) =

Albanian government agency for tourism

- Agjencia Kombëtare e Turizmit
- Official logo

Tourism agency overview
- Jurisdiction: Albania
- Headquarters: Tirana
- Tourism agency executive: Kornelia Ferizaj, Director General
- Website: akt.gov.al

The National Tourism Agency (AKT) (Albanian: Agjencia Kombëtare e Turizmit) is a government agency under the supervision of the Albanian Ministry of Tourism and Environment. The main task of the agency is to promote Albania as a tourist destination in the Mediterranean Basin, Europe and around the world. AKT organizes and manages the country's participation in international tourist fairs and provides on-line promotional offers to various international tour operators.
