= Lefter Koka =

Albanian politician (born 1964)

Lefter Koka MP

Member of the Albanian Parliament for Durrës
- In office September 9, 2017 – 1 September 2021

Minister of Environment
- In office 15 September 2013 – 13 September 2017
- President: Bujar Nishani; Ilir Meta
- Prime Minister: Edi Rama
- Succeeded by: Blendi Klosi

34th Mayor of Durrës
- In office 12 October 2003 – 18 February 2007
- Prime Minister: Fatos Nano; Sali Berisha
- Preceded by: Miri Hoti
- Succeeded by: Vangjush Dako

Personal details
- Born: 4 August 1964 (age 62) Durrës, Albania
- Party: Socialist Party of Albania
- Other political affiliations: Socialist Movement for Integration
- Education: International University of Struga

Lefter Koka (born 4 August 1964 in Durrës) is an Albanian politician who served as the Minister of Environment in the centre-left Coalition Government of Albania and was also a member of the Assembly of the Republic of Albania for the Socialist Party of Albania. Originally serving as a member for the Socialist Movement for Integration. Koka served as Mayor of Durrës from 2003 to 2007

Lefter Koca was arrested by order of the "Special Anti-Corruption Structure" (SPAK) on 14 December 2021, accused of involvement in the incinerator scandal. According to the indictment, during his tenure as Minister of Environment, he was bribed with about 5 million euros, from businessmen Klodian Zoto (Integrated Technology Service) and Stela Gugallja (Albtek Energy) in order to circumvent the legal procedures to award contracts for the construction and operation of incinerators in Fier and Elbasan, directly affecting the interests of the state. The "Court Against Organized Crime and Corruption" found him guilty of "corruption" "abuse of duty" and "money laundering" in connection with the incinerator in Fier and sentenced him to 10 year in prison. For the incinerator of Elbasan has found quilty of "passive corruption" and "money laundering" and sentenced him to 5 years and 8 months.

The case is in the "Special Appeal Court against Crime and Corruption". (GJKKO)
