= List of mayors of Durrës =

This is a list of mayors of Durrës who have served since the Albanian Declaration of Independence of 1912.

== Mayors (1912–present) ==
No.	Name	Term in office	
1	Hafiz Podgorica	1912	1912
2	Mehmet Gruda	1920	1922
3	Kosta Paftali	1923	1924
4	Hysen Myshteka	1924	1924
5	Jahja Ballhysa	1926	1926
6	Abedin Nepravishta	1927	1928
7	Ahmet Dakli	1929	1937
8	Rustem Ymeri	1937	1939
9	Shefqet Çelkupa	1939	1940
10	Llazar Tuni	1940	1943
11	Spiro Truja	1943	1944
12	Mahmut Çela	1944	1944
Executive Committee (1944–1992)
13	Nikollë Tirana	1944	1947
14	Qirjako Notidhi	1947	1948
15	Vlash Prifti	1948	1949
16	Nasi Driza	1949	1952
17	Zeqir Duma	1953	1956
18	Petraq Titani	1957	1959
19	Haki Kokomani	1959	1961
20	Ramazan Vogli	1961	1962
21	Bajram Thermia	1962	1971
22	Halit Nova	1972	1974
23	Bajram Hasa	1975	1979
24	Mihallaq Bushamaku	1979	1983
25	Sotir Luarasi	1983	1989
26	Ymer Balla	1989	1990
27	Petraq Koto	1991	1991
28	Nevruz Çela	1991	1992
29	Shkëlzen Jakova	1992	1992
Pluralist Era (1992–present)
30	Tomor Golemi	1992	1996
31	Arqile Gorea	1996	2000
32	Miri Hoti	2000	2003
33	Lefter Koka	2003	2006
34	Vangjush Dako	2006	2019
35	Valbona Sako	2019	2019
36	Emiriana Sako	2019	incumbent

== See also ==
- Politics of Albania
