= Sofjan Jaupaj =

Albanian politician (born 1990)

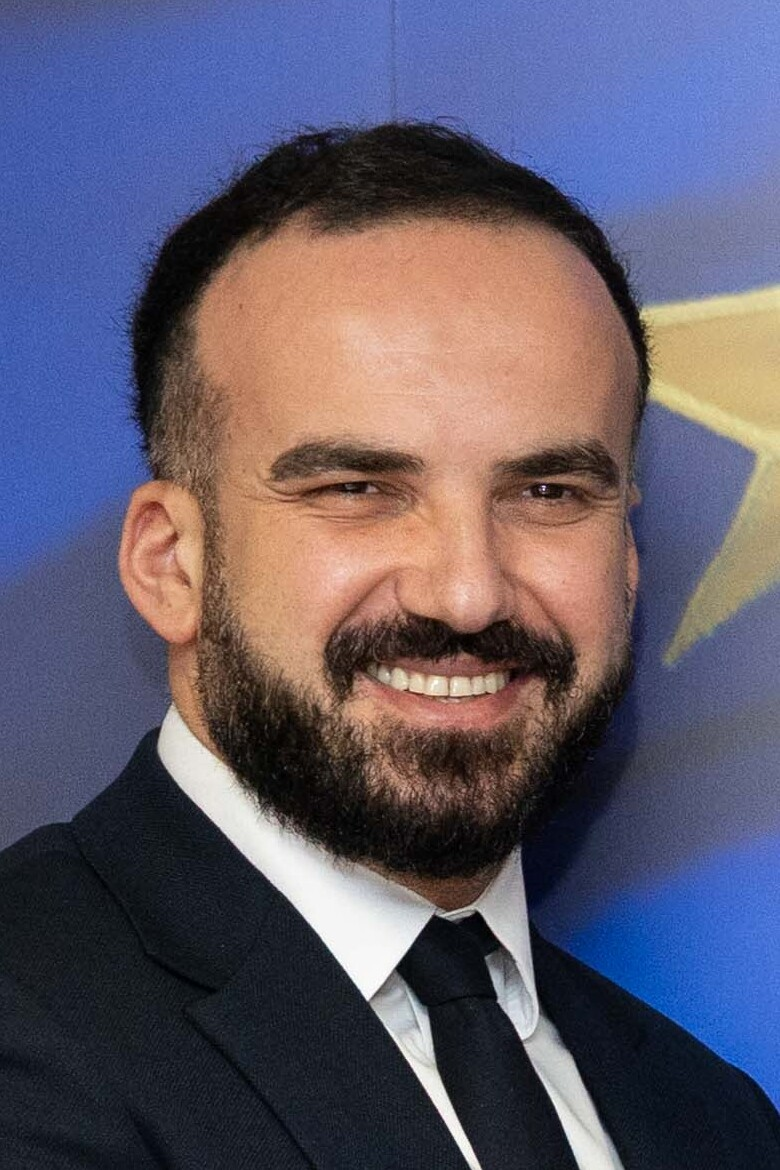
- Jaupaj in 2025

Minister of Environment
- Incumbent
- Assumed office 19 September 2025
- President: Bajram Begaj
- Prime Minister: Edi Rama

Personal details
- Born: 1 February 1990 (age 36) Tirana, Albania
- Party: Socialist Party of Albania
- Education: University of Tirana
- Profession: Politician, lawyer

Sofjan Jaupaj (born 1 February 1990) is an Albanian politician and lawyer. He has served as Minister of Environment of Albania since September 2025. Prior to this role, he was Deputy Minister of Tourism and Environment.

== Early life and education ==
Jaupaj was born in Tirana on 1 February 1990. He earned a law degree from the University of Tirana in 2013. He later completed postgraduate studies in Intellectual Property Law in Italy and Switzerland, supported by a scholarship from the World Intellectual Property Organization.

He has participated in training programs at the Vienna Diplomatic Academy, the College of Europe in Bruges, and Harvard Law School, focusing on European affairs, economic diplomacy, and copyright law. He is also a graduate of the Council of Europe’s Political Academy.

== Career ==
Jaupaj has held various positions in the Albanian public administration, including:

Chief of Cabinet to the Chief Negotiator for EU Integration

Director General and Coordinator for EU legal harmonization at the Prime Minister's Office, the Ministry of Tourism and Environment, and the Ministry of Culture.

Since 2021, he has served as Albania's National Designated Authority for the Green Climate Fund and the Global Environment Facility. He has also taught legal subjects as an external lecturer.
