= Jahja Ballhysa =

Albanian politician

Jahja Ballhysa (4 February 1857 - 1930) was an Albanian politician. He was one of the delegates of the Albanian Declaration of Independence in 1912 and the mayor of Durrës in 1926.

Jahja Ballhysa was an activist of the Albanian National Renaissance (Albanian: Rilindja Kombëtare). After completing his studies at the Collegio di Sant'Adriano (the college of Saint Adrian) in the Arbëreshë town of San Demetrio Corone, Calabria, he returned to Durrës where he joined the patriotic circles of the city. He participated in the Educational Congress in Elbasan in 1909. After overcoming resistance by the Young Turks, he opened in Durrës in 1909 a club called "Bashkimi" ("The Union"), of which he elected president. In Jahja Ballhysa's house and with his financial support it was opened the first Albanian language school in Durrës. He participated in the Albanian Revolts of 1910, 1911 and 1912. He gave valuable support to revolt in the field of journalism in particular, calling on the people to support the Albanian Revolt of 1911. He represented the province of Durrës at the Assembly of Vlorë on November 28, 1912, in which Albania declared the Independence. Jahja Ballhysa signed on behalf of the elite of the city Durrës the petition, which all the Albania's cities elites addressed to the President of the US, Woodrow Wilson, on July 12, 1918, to request his intervention in the Paris Peace Conference, 1919 to rectify the injustice of the Treaty of London (1915) on the Albanian territories. During 1922-1923 Jahja Ballhysa led the progressive forces of the city of Durrës and he was elected Mayor by the opposition. He was part of the Uprising of March 1922. For that reason he was arrested and sentenced with hard imprisonment by the government of Ahmet Zogu. He supported Fan Noli in the June Revolution of 1924. Jahja Ballhysa died in Durrës.
