= New Democratic Spirit =

New Democratic Spirit Fryma e Re Demokratike
- Leader: Sali Shehu
- Secretary-General: Vacant
- Founder: Bamir Topi; Gazmend Oketa
- Founded: April 30, 2012
- Split from: Democratic Party of Albania
- Headquarters: Former Headquarter Democratic Party
- Ideology: Liberal conservatism; Pro-Europeanism
- Political position: Centre-right
- National affiliation: Alliance for a Magnificent Albania
- National Assembly: 0 / 140
- Municipalities: 0 / 61
- Council Seats: 17 / 1,613

Website
- www.frd.al

The New Democratic Spirit (Albanian: Fryma e Re Demokratike) is a centre-right conservative political party in Albania. New Democratic Spirit was created by Gazmend Oketa, the former Deputy Prime Minister and Defense Minister of the Republic of Albania, and other former members of the Democratic Party of Albania. Albanian media call it "the President's Party", referring to Albanian President Bamir Topi.

== Chairmen of NDS ==
Person	Period
Gazmend Oketa	30 April 2012 – 7 September 2012
Bamir Topi	7 September 2012 – 25 February 2021
Sali Shehu	5 March 2021 - Incumbent
