= Democratic Renewal (disambiguation) =

Democratic Renewal Party can refer to:

- 2016 Plebiscite on Democratic Renewal
- Alliance for Democratic Renewal
- Democratic Renewal
- Democratic Renewal (Andorra)
- Democratic Renewal Party (Albania)
- Democratic Renewal Party (Angola)
- Democratic Renewal Party (Benin)
- Democratic Renewal Party (Brazil)
- Democratic Renewal Party (Cape Verde)
- Democratic Renewal Party (Djibouti)
- Democratic Renewal Party (Indonesia)
- Democratic Renewal (Denmark)
- Democratic Renewal (Lebanon)
- Democratic Renewal of Macedonia
- Democratic Renewal Party (Portugal)
- Democratic Renewal Secretariat
- Movement for Democratic Renewal and Development
- Union for Democratic Renewal (Republic of the Congo)
- Union for Democratic Renewal (Senegal)
- Union for the Triumph of Democratic Renewal
- Party of Democratic Renewal (Slovenia)
- Serbian Democratic Renewal Movement
