= Servet Pëllumbi =

Albanian politician (1936–2026)

34th Speaker of the Parliament of Albania
- In office 30 April 2002 – 3 September 2005
- Preceded by: Namik Dokle
- Succeeded by: Jozefina Topalli

Personal details
- Born: 14 December 1936 Korçë, Albania
- Died: 5 May 2026 (aged 89) Tirana, Albania
- Party: Socialist Party of Albania Labour Party of Albania

Servet Pëllumbi (14 December 1936 – 5 May 2026) was an Albanian politician. He served as Chairman of the Assembly of the Republic of Albania from 30 April 2002 until 3 September 2005. Pëllumbi was a lecturer in Political Academy of the Socialist Party of Albania.

Pëllumbi died following a brief illness on 5 May 2026, at the age of 89.

== See also ==
- Political Academy of the Socialist Party of Albania
