= Vangjush Dako =

Albanian politician

35th Mayor of Durrës
- In office 2007 – 2 August 2019
- Preceded by: Lefter Koka
- Succeeded by: Valbona Sako

Personal details
- Born: 29 November 1966 (age 59) Durrës, Albania
- Party: Socialist Party of Albania

Vangjush Dako is an Albanian politician. He has served as the mayor of the city of Durrës. He was elected to the post following the February 2007 local elections. He is a member of the Socialist Party of Albania.

== Biography ==
Vangjush Dako was born in Durrës, on 29 November 1966. He attended Tirana University's School of Engineering, where he graduated in 1991.

On 30 July 2019, he was sanctioned by the United States Department of State for "involvement in significant corruption".

In June 2023, Vangjush Dako (and 8 other officials of the Municipality of Durres) were arrested by order of the SPAK for abuse of power in two cases. The first case concerns the construction of a building in Durrës, which collapsed due to the earthquake in November 2019, and to which extra floors were added without permission, legalised by Mayor Dako through non-transparent procedures. The second concerns a tenfold increase in the cost of work on the project to build a promenade in the Currilove area of the municipality, causing a loss of ALL 18 million to the state budget. SPAK started legal proceedings in November 2024. He is currently under trial.

== See also ==
- Corruption in Albania
