= National Coastline Agency (Albania) =

Government agency of Albania

- Agjencia Kombëtare e Bregdetit
- Official logo

Tourism agency overview
- Formed: 22 January 2014
- Jurisdiction: Albania
- Headquarters: Tirana
- Tourism agency executive: Ledion Lako, Director General
- Website: bregdeti.gov.al

The National Coastline Agency (AKB; Albanian: Agjencia Kombëtare e Bregdetit) is an institution of the Albanian Government responsible for monitoring the implementation of policies and regulations that promote sustainable tourism developments along the coastal region of the country. The Agency is organized at central level by the General Directorate and has four regional branches. Its main objective is to create a system of rules and standards which enable the proper administration of public spaces along the beaches and rural areas of the coast.
