= Democratic Renewal Party (Albania) =

Political party in Albania

- Leader: Dashamir Shehi
- Split from: New Democratic Party
- Merged into: Movement for National Development

The Democratic Renewal Party (in Albanian: Partia Demokratike e Rinovuar) is a political party in Albania led by Dashamir Shehi. It was formed following a split from the New Democratic Party.

In the 2005 parliamentary elections, the party was part of the Movement for National Development coalition.
