= Healthcare in Albania =

According to the Constitution of Albania, citizens are entitled to healthcare. The healthcare system in Albania is primarily public. The public system is made up of three tiers: primary care, secondary care, and tertiary care. Primary healthcare covers basic health needs. Secondary healthcare is needed when seeing a specialist after being referred to by a general practitioner. Tertiary healthcare funds are dedicated for highly specialized medical care that is needed over a long duration of time. There are over 400 public clinics that offer both primary and secondary healthcare services, along with over 40 public hospitals that offer tertiary healthcare services.

In 2018, per capita healthcare spending in Albania was US$275, an approximate 20% increase from 2017. Public healthcare is financed by employers and employees who fill a government fund with money. The Albanian Health Insurance Institute, which was established in 1994, currently covers the cost of health care. It is primarily funded by a 3.4% charge on gross salaries.

Over the last decade, the private healthcare sector has significantly grown with over 10 private hospitals and many private clinics. Generally, dental and pharmaceutical care services are private. Albania has over 1,000 pharmacies, with nearly all the drugs sold in them being imports from other countries.

== History ==
Albania was under Communist rule throughout most of the 20th century. The healthcare system in Albania was based on the Soviet Semashko model, a centralized and hierarchic system of healthcare. The healthcare system was public and free of charge. The healthcare system, however, was severely underfunded. The system also did not offer many freedoms. For example, patients were unable to choose to withdraw care and undergo assisted suicide. The country lacked enough hospitals, and therefore, house calls from doctors were common for very ill patients. Medical staff primarily received training from the Mother of Teresa School of Medicine. Medical practitioners were thoroughly trained. However, many talented doctors sought jobs outside the country due to the low wages medical workers received in Albania. Medical workers in Albania also lacked proper supplies and equipment. For instance, due to a shortage of hospital space, delivery rooms were often overcrowded, typically holding five to seven patients in one small room.

Between medical workers’ lack of sufficient tools and a malnutrition problem that the country was experiencing, infant mortality rates peaked. Still, precise data measuring mortality is not available because the Communist regime forged data during this time in order to manipulate the public into believing that their living conditions were better. As a result of the high infant mortality rate, women were encouraged to give birth to many children and, often, rewarded for doing so. For example, during periods of the 1900s, women who lived in rural areas and birthed 6 or more children were rewarded by the government with a cow.

After the collapse of Communism in Albania in the late 1900s, the healthcare system began to undergo a process of modernization. The government has invested a substantial amount of money into the Mother Teresa Hospital, allowing for the hospital to buy new equipment and perform a new array of procedures. Furthermore, the government has supported the opening of a National Emergency Center in the capital of Albania, which is responsible for efficiently coordinating emergency calls throughout the country. The training of paramedics and the use of ambulances has also gained popularity throughout the country.

== Staffing ==
Currently, the only medical school in Albania is the University of Medicine. It is located in Tirana, the capital of Albania. The University of Medicine is a public university, which teaches about 9,000 students. The school only charges about US$1,000 per year. Since there is only one, small medical school in Albania, the country faces a shortage of properly trained doctors. Additionally, by charging a mere US$1,000 in tuition per year, the school is unable to provide students with the most current technology and training. Consequently, the medical services that are provided to people in Albania are not of high quality. Although medical service has immensely improved over the last century, medical service in the country remains flawed. The poor medical service in the country, however, does allow for government spending on healthcare to be relatively low, in comparison to the government spending of countries with superior medical services.

== System Efficiency ==
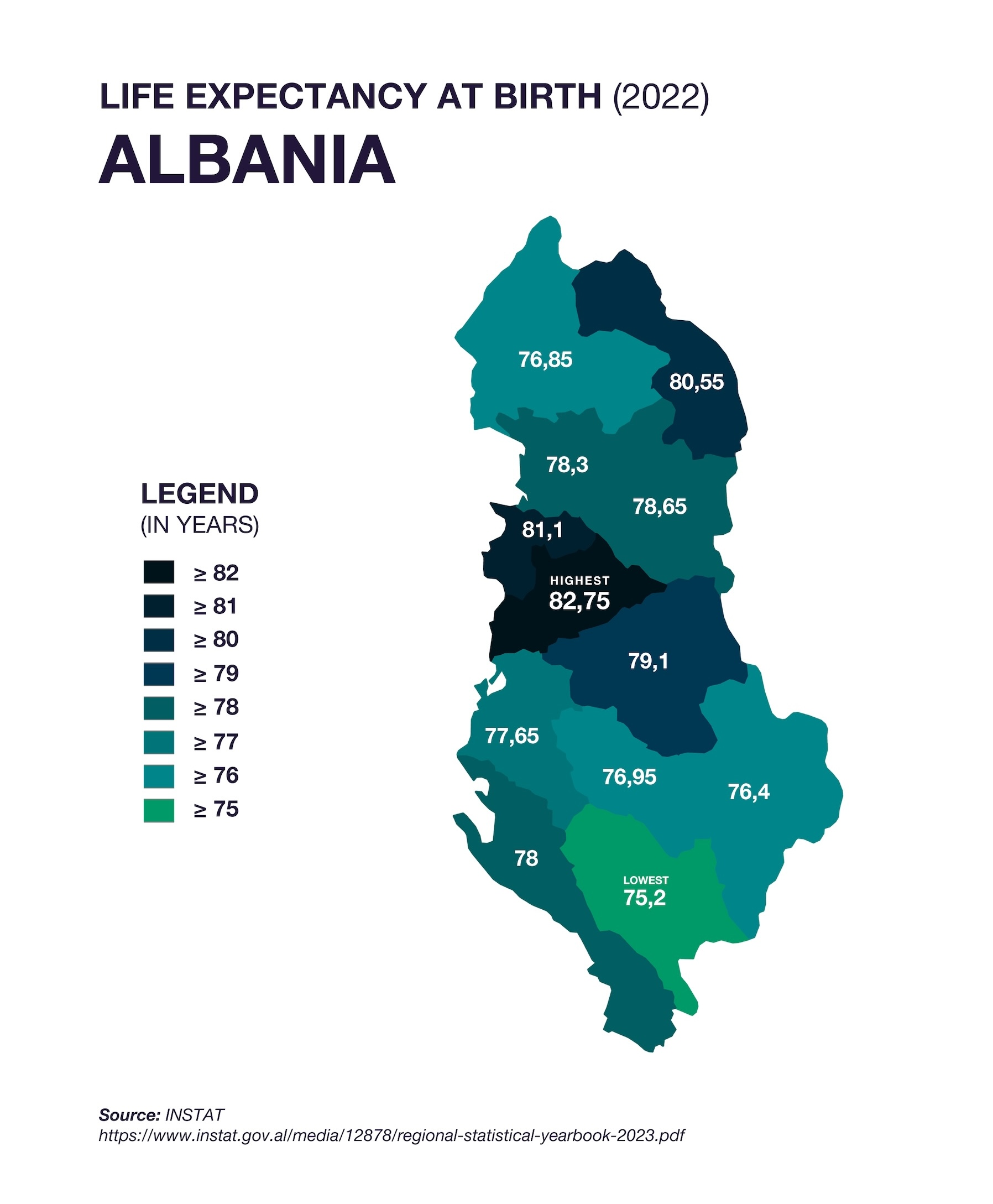
Life expectancy at birth in Albania per region (2022)

The life expectancy at birth in Albania, as of 2024, is 80 years old, which is high when compared to the life expectancy in Albania in 1960: 62 years old. The region with the highest life expectancy at birth in 2022 was the capital city, Tirana, with 83 years. This improvement in life expectancy gives insight into the drastic healthcare improvements that have been made in the country since the mid-1900s. The infant mortality rate in Albania in 2019 was only 8.9, an approximate 4 point decrease from 10 years prior. Still, this rate is high in comparison to the mere 5.6 infant mortality rate in the United States.

While the healthcare system in Albania is fairly effective, as demonstrated by the life expectancy in the country, the healthcare system in Albania is riddled with corruption, as are most systems in the country. Doctors, however, are the public officials that receive the most bribes. One study found that 71% of citizens with recent corruption experience have given bribes to doctors. Furthermore, this same study found that 47% of citizens with recent corruption experience have given bribes to nurses.

Overall, the Albania healthcare system has undergone significant improvements and is on the way to many more, such as, for instance, the 2013-2022 Albanian Plan for Mental Health Services Development. This plan is aimed at protecting and helping individuals with mental health issues. Under the framework of this plan, the government built community mental health centers and support homes to aid in the treatment and care of citizens struggling with their mental health. The plan also has worked towards reintegrating institutionalised patients into society, transitioning them from psychiatric wards and hospitals.
