= Albanian Health Insurance Institute =

The Albanian Health Insurance Institute was established by Law no. 7870, dated 13.10.1994 On Health Insurance in the Republic of Albania.

When first established it only funded drugs. It is now the single payer for the Albanian healthcare system. It took over the costs of primary care in 2007 and hospitals in 2009. Its budget has increased from 2.68 billion lek in 2006, to 4.64 billion in 2007, and 20.7 billion in 2011. There is a list of 477 drugs which are reimbursed. Rates of reimbursement vary from 50% to 100% dependent on social categories of patients.

The fund covers primary care and some of the costs of hospital care. Copayments on both were introduced in 2008. It is funded by a 3.4% charge on gross salaries and supplied 74.1% of the public expenditure on health in 2013, the balance being funded from general taxation. Hospital services such as scanning are free for children up to 12 years old, people who are totally disabled, war veterans and patients with tuberculosis or cancer. Other patients may have to make a 10% copayment, but must be referred by a general practitioner. Small contributions are also required for outpatient or inpatient treatment.

The rate of the health insurance contribution is a highly visible political decision. It is also administratively linked to the collection of social security contributions, which are much higher, and so increase the incentive to avoid them. Trust in the health system is low and the rate of informal payments is high.
