= Astrit Bushati =

Albanian politician

Member of the Albanian parliament
- Incumbent
- Assumed office 2005

Personal details
- Born: Astrit Myfit Bushati; 21 August 1962 (age 64) Shkodër, Albania
- Party: Democratic Party
- Education: University of Tirana
- Committees: Committee on Legal Affairs, Public Administration and Human Rights

Astrit Myfit Bushati is a member of the Assembly of the Republic of Albania for the Democratic Party of Albania. Bushati is also a member of the committee on Legal Affairs, Public Administration and Human Rights.

== Background ==
Bushati was born in Shkodër and graduated from the faculty of Law at the University of Tirana. He joined the Democratic Party of Albania in 1991, and has been party leader in Shkodër since 2005. He served as a member of the City Council of Shkodër from 1996 until 2001.

== Political activity ==
Bushati has the following political history:

- 1991–present: Member of the Democratic Party
- 1996–2001: Member of Municipal Council, Shkodër
- 1997–2001: Chairman of the Democratic Party, Shkodër
- 1998–2001: Member of National Council and the Presidency of the Democratic Party
- 2005–present: DP chairman, Shkodra
- 2005–present: Member of Albanian Parliament
