= Ministry of Tourism and Environment (Albania) =

Former government ministry of Albania

- Ministria e Turizmit dhe Mjedisit

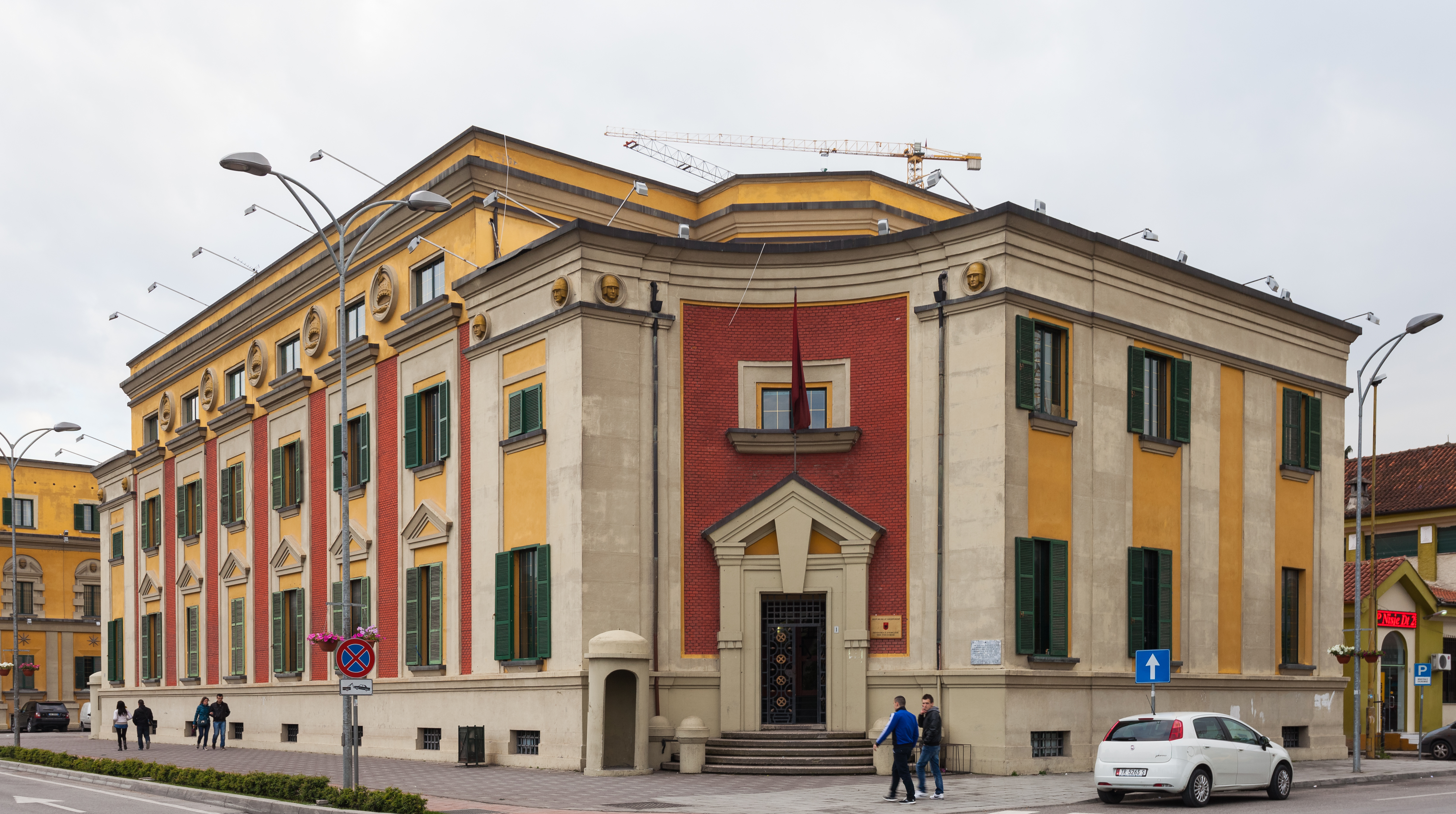

Department overview
- Formed: 11 May 1991; 35 years ago
- Dissolved: 19 September 2025
- Superseding agencies: Ministry of Tourism, Culture and Sport; Ministry of Environment
- Jurisdiction: Government of Albania

The Ministry of Tourism and Environment (Albanian: Ministria e Turizmit dhe Mjedisit) was a department of the Albanian Government in charge of regulation concerning the environment, the sustainable use of natural resources, promotion of renewable resources, protection of nature and biodiversity, sustainable development and management of forestry and pastures, and the quality monitoring of water resources. The ministry was dissolved in September 2025 and its functions were transferred to the Ministry of Tourism, Culture and Sport and the Ministry of Environment.

== Subordinate institutions ==
- National Environment Agency (AKM)
- National Agency of Protected Areas (AKZM)
- National Tourism Agency (AKT)
- National Coastline Agency (AKB)
- National Forestry Agency (AKP)

== Reorganization ==
- Ministry of Domestic Trade and Tourism (1991–1992)
- Ministry of Tourism (1992–1994)
- Ministry of Construction and Tourism (1994–1996)
- Ministry of Public Works, Territorial Regulation and Tourism (1996–1997)
- Ministry of Trade and Tourism (1997–1998)
- Ministry of Public Works and Tourism (2001–2002)
- Ministry of Territorial Regulation and Tourism (2002–2005)
- Ministry of Tourism, Culture, Youth and Sports (2005–2013)
- Ministry of Economic Development, Tourism, Trade and Enterprise (2013–2017)
- Ministry of Tourism and Environment (2017–present)

== Officeholders (1991–present) ==
| No. | Name | Term in office |
| 1 | Gavrosh Pogaçe | 11 May 1991 | 4 June 1991 |
| 2 | Agim Mero | 11 June 1991 | 6 December 1991 |
| 3 | Robert Gjini | 18 December 1991 | 13 April 1992 |
| 4 | Osman Shehu | 13 April 1992 | 6 April 1993 |
| 5 | Edmond Spaho | 6 April 1993 | 3 December 1994 |
| 6 | Dashamir Shehi | 4 December 1994 | 10 July 1996 |
| 7 | Albert Brojka | 11 July 1996 | 1 March 1997 |
| 8 | Vasillaq Spaho | 11 March 1997 | 24 July 1997 |
| 9 | Shaqir Vukaj | 25 July 1997 | 23 April 1998 |
| 10 | Bashkim Fino | 6 September 2001 | 29 January 2002 |
| 11 | Fatmir Xhafaj | 22 February 2002 | 25 July 2002 |
| 12 | Besnik Dervishi | 29 July 2002 | 29 December 2003 |
| – | Bashkim Fino | 29 December 2003 | 10 September 2005 |
| 13 | Bujar Leskaj | 10 September 2005 | 19 March 2007 |
| 14 | Ylli Pango | 20 March 2007 | 3 March 2009 |
| 15 | Ardian Turku | 17 March 2009 | 17 September 2009 |
| 16 | Ferdinand Xhaferaj | 17 September 2009 | 21 July 2011 |
| 17 | Aldo Bumçi | 25 July 2011 | 3 April 2013 |
| 18 | Visar Zhiti | 4 April 2013 | 15 September 2013 |
| 19 | Arben Ahmetaj | 15 September 2013 | 17 February 2016 |
| 20 | Milva Ekonomi | 26 February 2016 | 13 September 2017 |
| 21 | Blendi Klosi | 13 September 2017 | 18 September 2021 |
| 22 | Mirela Kumbaro | 18 September 2021 | 19 September 2025 |

== See also ==
- Tourism in Albania
