= Gazmend Oketa =

Albanian politician (born 1968)

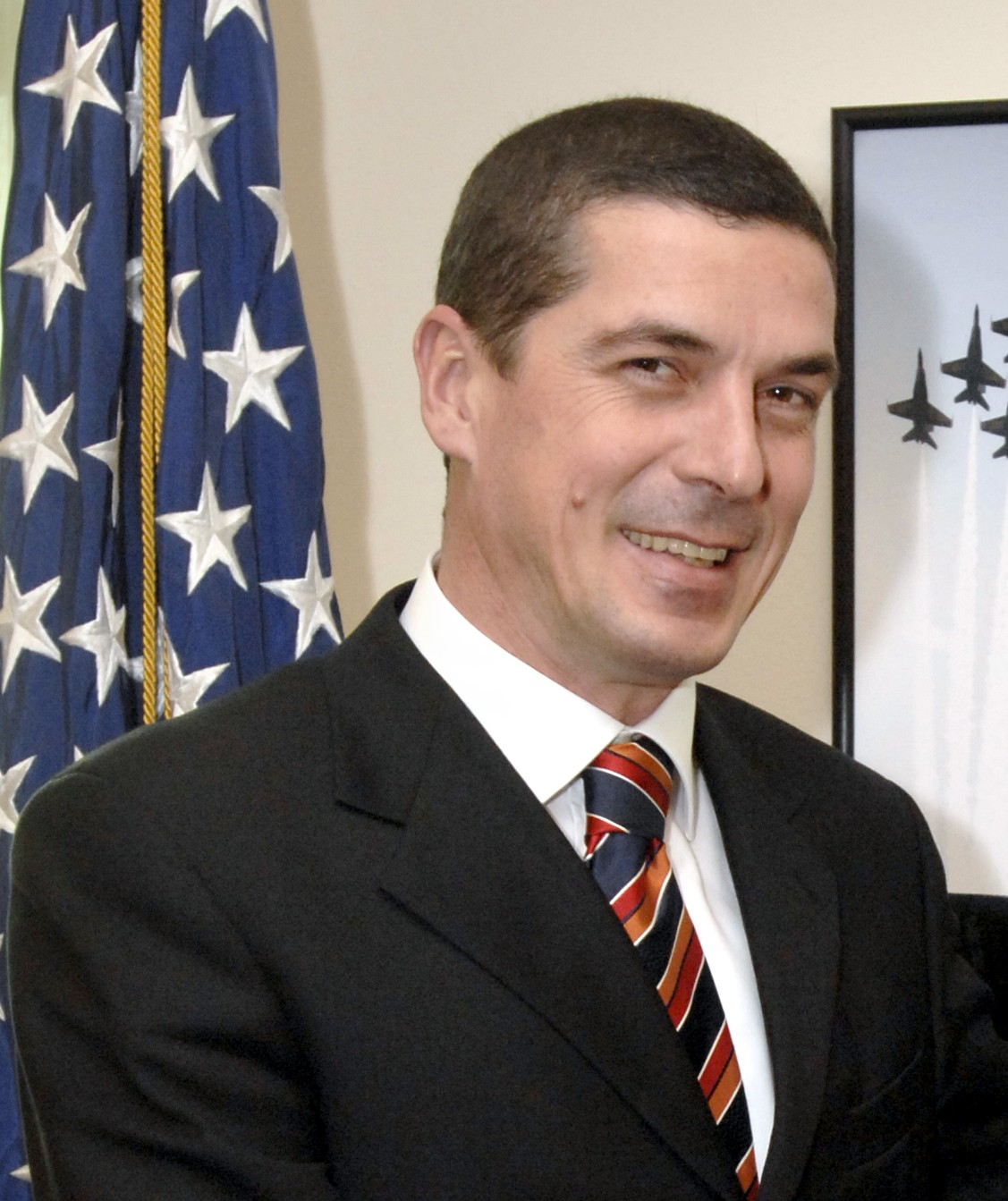
- Oketa at the Pentagon in 2008

31st Defence Minister of Albania
- In office March 22, 2008 – September 17, 2009
- President: Bamir Topi
- Prime Minister: Sali Berisha
- Preceded by: Fatmir Mediu
- Succeeded by: Arben Imami

Deputy Prime Minister
- In office March 12, 2007 – 2008
- President: Alfred Moisiu; Bamir Topi
- Prime Minister: Sali Berisha
- Preceded by: Ilir Rusmajli

Personal details
- Born: 14 December 1968 (age 57)
- Party: Democratic Party (2002-2012,2018-present); New Democratic Spirit (2012-2018)

Gazmend Oketa (born 14 December 1968 in Durrës District, Albania) is an Albanian politician. He served as Deputy Prime Minister of Albania, as well as Minister of Defence.

== Political career ==
On 12 March 2007, Oketa was named Deputy Prime Minister, replacing Ilir Rusmajli. On 22 March 2008, Oketa succeeded Fatmir Mediu as Minister Of Defence following Medihu's resignation. He was replaced on 17 September 2009 by Arben Imami.

On 30 May 2012, Oketa formed a new political party in Albania, New Democratic Spirit, alongside other Democratic Party politicians. Albanian media called it "The Party of President" referring to Bamir Topi.
