= Jemin Gjana =

Albanian politician (born 1950)

Member of the Albanian parliament
- Incumbent
- Assumed office 2009

Personal details
- Political party: Democratic Party

Jemin Gjana (Born May 5, 1950) is a member of the Assembly of the Republic of Albania for the Democratic Party of Albania.
