= Vangjel Dule =

Albanian politician of Greek descent

Vangjel Dule Βαγγέλης Ντούλες
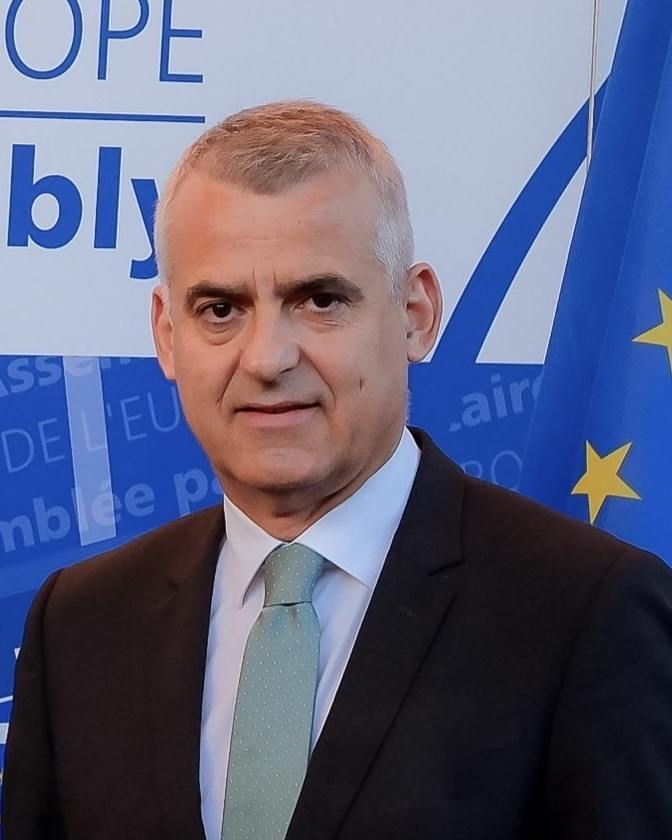

Member of the Albanian parliament

Chairman of PBDNJ
- Incumbent
- Assumed office 2002
- Preceded by: Vasil Melo

Personal details
- Born: 18 November 1968 (age 57) Gjirokastër, Albania
- Citizenship: Albania; Greece
- Party: Unity for Human Rights Party
- Education: University of Tirana
- Occupation: Politician

Vangjel Dule (Greek: Ευάγγελος Ντούλες; born 18 November 1968) is an Albanian politician of Greek descent. He has been the Chairman of the Unity for Human Rights Party (PBDNJ) since 2002 and has represented the Greek National Minority in the Parliament of Albania for over two decades.

Dule previously served as the First Deputy Speaker of the Parliament of Albania from 2013 to 2015, from which he resigned as a principled gesture of protest against the allocation of parliamentary leadership positions within the governing coalition. Dule has also served as a member of the Parliamentary Assembly of the Council of Europe.

== Early life and education ==
Dule was born in 1968 in Gjirokastër, a city with a significant Greek minority population in southern Albania. He attended the University of Tirana, graduating with a degree in English language and literature.

== Political career ==
Dule began his political career in the early 1990s as the Greek minority in Albania sought greater recognition and rights following the collapse of communism. In 2001, he was elected to represent Vlorë County in the Albanian Parliament.

In 2002, Dule was elected chairman of the Unity for Human Rights Party, which advocates for the rights of ethnic and linguistic minorities in Albania, with a particular focus on the Greek community. He has remained in this position since.

He served as a member of the Parliamentary Assembly of the Council of Europe from 2002 to 2006 and again from 2007 to 2010, where he worked on issues of human rights and minority protection at a European level.

He served as the First Deputy Speaker of the Parliament of Albania from 2013 to 2015, from which he resigned as a principled gesture of protest against the allocation of parliamentary leadership positions within the governing coalition.

In the 2017 and 2021 parliamentary elections, the Unity for Human Rights Party entered into electoral alliances with the Democratic Party of Albania, allowing Dule to secure his parliamentary seat.

Dule has also been a prominent supporter of Fredi Beleri, the ethnic Greek mayor of Himarë arrested in 2023, accusing the Albanian government of politically motivated persecution against the Greek minority.

Throughout his political career, Dule has been a strong critic of Albanian governments, which he has accused of neglecting minority rights. He has advocated for bilingual education, property rights for the Greek minority, and closer relations between Albania and Greece.

== Personal life ==
Dule holds both Greek and Albanian citizenship and is fluent in English, in addition to his native Greek and Albanian.

He is married and has a son and a daughter.
