= Spiro Ksera =

Albanian politician

Spiro Ksera (Greek: Σπύρος Ξέρας, Spyros Kseras) is an Albanian politician and representative of the country's Greek element. He was Minister of Labor, Social Affairs and Equal Opportunities of Albania from 2009 until 2013. He was initially a member of the Greek minority's Unity for Human Rights Party but later became a member of the Democratic Party of Albania.

Ksera, an ethnic Greek, was born in the town of Derviçan, in Dropull region and studied mechanical engineering at the University of Tirana. During the period 2005–2009 he was the prefect of Gjirokastër County, in southern Albania.

Ksera was arrested in 2016 and sentenced to 20 months in prison on charges of abuse of power. The charge specifically relates to the embezzlement of 30 million leks ($285,000) intended for pro-minority events that never took place.

== See also ==
- Politics of Albania
