= Koço Barka =

Albanian politician (1954–2024)

Albanian Minister of social affairs and equal opportunities
- In office 2005–2008

Member of the Albanian parliament
- In office 2011 – 8 March 2024

Personal details
- Born: 30 March 1954
- Died: 8 March 2024 (aged 69)
- Party: Union for Human Rights (UHRP), Democratic Party

Koço Barka (30 March 1954 – 8 March 2024) was an Albanian politician of the Greek minority.

From 2005 to 2008 he served as Minister of social affairs and equal opportunities in Sali Berisha's government, representing the Union for Human Rights (UHRP), an ethnic Greek minority party. He was replaced in October 2008 by another member of the same party, after an internal party dispute.

In May 2009 Barka was put under investigation for abuse of power, accused of mishandling funds and donations aimed for an NGO that ran a school for children of families caught in blood feuds, in the town of Poliçan, near Berat.

From 2011 onwards, he served as a member of the Assembly of the Republic of Albania for the Democratic Party of Albania.

Barka died on 8 March 2024, at the age of 69.
