= Nard Ndoka =

Albanian politician

Minister of Health
- In office March 1, 2007 – July 23, 2008
- Prime Minister: Sali Berisha
- Preceded by: Maksim Cikuli
- Succeeded by: Anila Godo

Personal details
- Born: May 18, 1963 (age 62) Laç, Albania
- Party: Demochristian Party of Albania
- Other political affiliations: New Democratic Party Democratic Party

Nard Ndoka was the minister of health of Albania from March 2007 to August 2008. He started his political career with Democratic Party in the early 1990. Now he is the leader of the Demochristian Party of Albania, which is now in coalition with the Democratic Party.
