= Fatos Beja =

Albanian politician

Member of the Albanian parliament
- Incumbent
- Assumed office 2009

Personal details
- Political party: Democratic Party

Fatos Asllan Beja (born 29 November 1948 in Vlorë) is a member of the Assembly of the Republic of Albania for the Democratic Party of Albania. Beja is from 2009 the Chairman of the Committee on Foreign Policy of Albania.
