= Valentina Leskaj =

Albanian politician (born 1948)

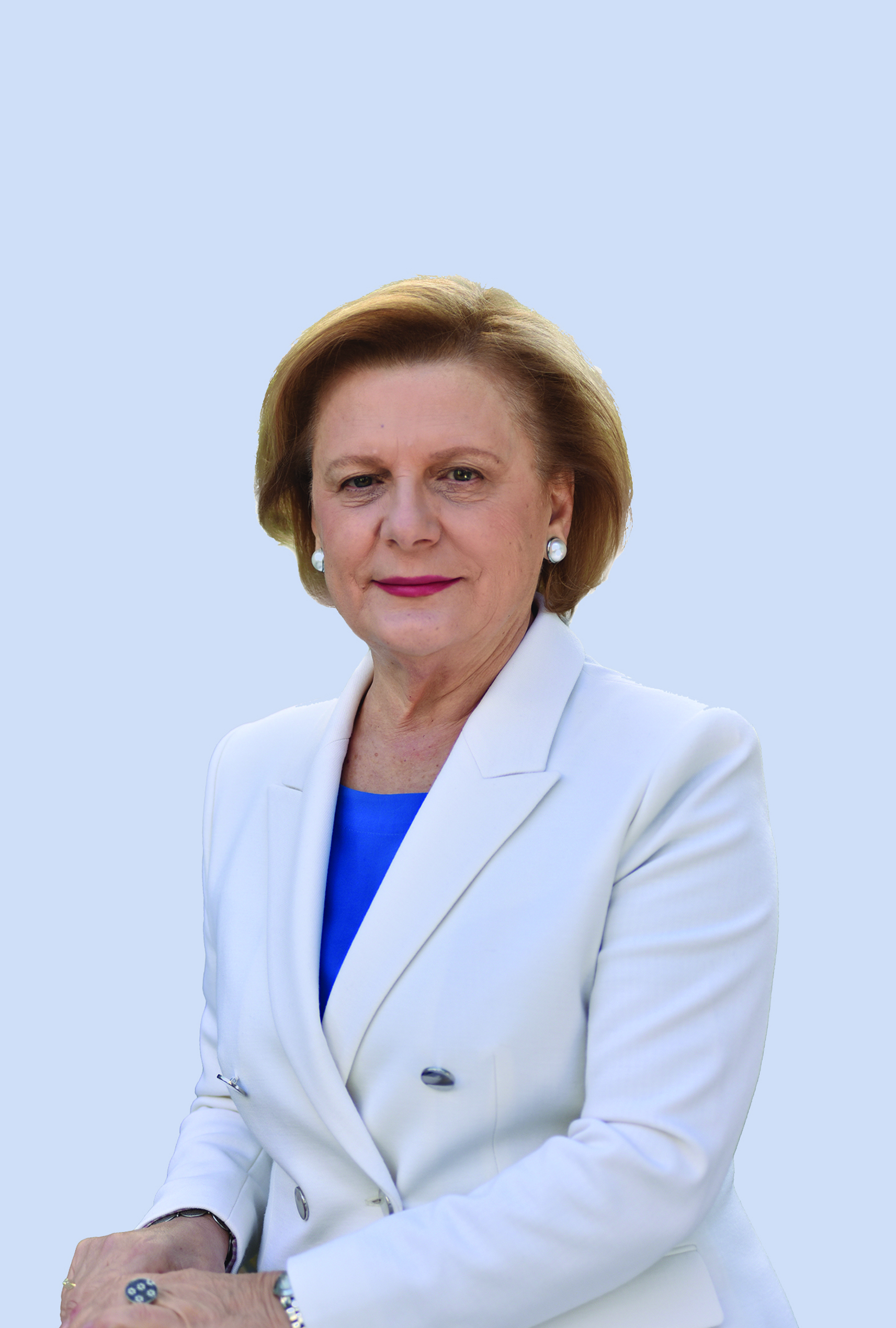

Minister of Labor and Social Affairs
- In office 2002–2004
- Prime Minister: Fatos Nano

Personal details
- Born: 1 November 1948 (age 78) Tepelenë, Albania
- Party: Socialist Party of Albania
- Education: University of Tirana

Valentina Leskaj (born 1 November 1948, Tepelena, Albania) is an Albanian politician and political economist who was a member of the Assembly of the Republic of Albania for the Socialist Party from 2002 until 2017, when she decided to resign and leave politics.

In August 2022, Valentina Leskaj is elected board member of the Albanian Institute for International Studies (AIIS)

On 14 September 2020, Valentina Leskaj was elected to the advisory board of the Combat Antisemitism Movement (CAM), becoming the first Muslim member of the board.

From 2015 to 2017, she served as deputy speaker of the Albanian Parliament.

From 2013 to 2017, Leskaj served as head of the Albanian Parliamentary Delegation to the Parliamentary Assembly of the Council of Europe.

From 2014 to 2017, she was elected Member of the Monitoring Committee of the Parliamentary Assembly of the Council of Europe and the Political Affairs Committee

Leskaj was elected vice president of the Progressive Alliance of Socialists and Democrats in the Parliamentary Assembly of the Council of Europe in 2014, and held the position until 2017.

From 2013 to 2017, she held the position of president of the parliamentary Albania-Israel Friendship Group

On 25 June 2015, Valentina Leskaj, was elected Rapporteur of the Parliamentary Assembly of the Council of Europe for Moldova. She was nominated by the Socialist Group and voted with the support of all political groups at the Monitoring Committee meeting held in Strasbourg. She held this position until 2017.

In 2014, she was elected Vice President of Parliamentary Assembly of Council of Europe and held the position until 2016

Leskaj was the Albanian Parliamentary Assembly Leader for the parliamentary group of the Socialist Party from 2007 to 2009

From 2006 to 2009, she was chairwoman of the CEI Parliamentary Committee on Education and Culture.

From 2005 to 2013, Leskaj served as chairwoman of the Parliamentary Commission for Education and Media.

In 2004, she was appointed chairwoman of the Parliamentary Commission for EU Integration, a position that she held until 2005.

From 2003 to 2009, Leskaj served as chairwoman of the Albanian Parliament delegation at the Parliamentary Assembly of the Council of Europe.

In 2003, she was elected Chairwoman of the Parliamentary Commission for Labour and Social Affairs and served until 2004.

She was appointed as Minister of Labour and Social Affairs of Albania in 2002, a position that she held until 2004.

== Earlier career ==
Leskaj graduated in Political Economy at the University of Tirana, Faculty of Economics, Valentina Leskaj was a lecturer of this faculty from 1979 to 1987.

From 1983 to 1988, she was chief editor of the magazine Shqiptarja e Re, a magazine created by The Organ of the Women's Union of Albania during the People's Socialist Republic of Albania.

Since 1994, Leskaj is cofounder and vice president of the UNESCO Center for Women and Peace in the Balkan Countries and of Inter-Balkan Women's Co-operation Societies.

Leskaj was a founder of the Albanian Center for Population and Development (ACPD), a non-profit organization established in 1995 which works for improvement of policies, legislation, the right of information and services for issues concerning population and development, and health issues including reproductive health. She was an executive director until 2002.

Between 2003 and 2014, she was president of the Albanian Centre for Population and Development.

From 1997 to 2002, she was president of the Albanian NGOs Forum, an umbrella organization.

== Publications ==
- Leskaj, Valentina (2022), Tolerance and Coexistence: opinion,
- Leskaj, Valentina (2021), Politics as Idea, ISBN 9789928348012
- Leskaj, Valentina (2000), "Në shtëpinë e Bardhë për Planifikimin Familjar "
- Leskaj, Valentina (2000), "Forgotten Countries with Dire Needs: Eastern European and Central Asian Country Assessments", ISBN 0961916524
- Leskaj, Valentina;(2016) " Asimetrite e Zhvillimit si Shkak i Varferise", ISBN 9789928190673
- Leskaj, Valentina (2013), The 28th International Women Leaders’ Conference: The Post-2015 and Sustainable Development Goals Agenda: Ensuring the centrality of gender equality and women's empowerment in the next framework. Published in November 2013, Haifa, Israel
- Leskaj, Valentina (2000) "Shoqeria Shqiptare Perballe Sfidave te Trafikut te Grave dhe Vajzave"
- Leskaj Valentina (1997) "Te Drejtat Riprodhuese"
