= Ridvan Bode =

Albanian politician

former Minister of Finance
- In office 2009–2013
- President: Bamir Topi
- Preceded by: Arben Malaj
- Succeeded by: Shkelqim Cani

Member of parliament
- In office 1996–2017

Personal details
- Born: 26 June 1959 (age 66) Korçë, Albania
- Party: Democratic Party

Ridvan Vait Bode (born June 26, 1959) is an Albanian politician. A member of the Democratic Party of Albania, he is a former Minister of Finance in the cabinet of Sali Berisha.

== Other sources ==
- Biographical data from the Albanian government (in Albanian)
