= Namik Dokle =

Albanian politician

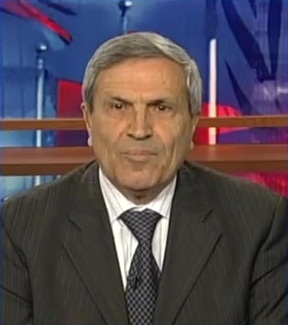
- Picture of Namik Dokle

33rd Speaker of the Parliament of Albania
- In office 4 September 2001 – 30 April 2002
- Preceded by: Skënder Gjinushi
- Succeeded by: Servet Pëllumbi

Personal details
- Born: 11 March 1946 (age 79); Durrës, Albania
- Political party: Socialist Party of Albania

Namik Dokle (born 11 March 1946) is an Albanian politician. He served as Speaker of the Assembly of the Republic of Albania from 4 September 2001 to 30 April 2002.

Dokle is lecturer in Political Academy of the Socialist Party of Albania.

== See also ==
- Political Academy of the Socialist Party of Albania
