= Ministry of Transport (Albania) =

Albanian government agency

- Ministria e Transportit
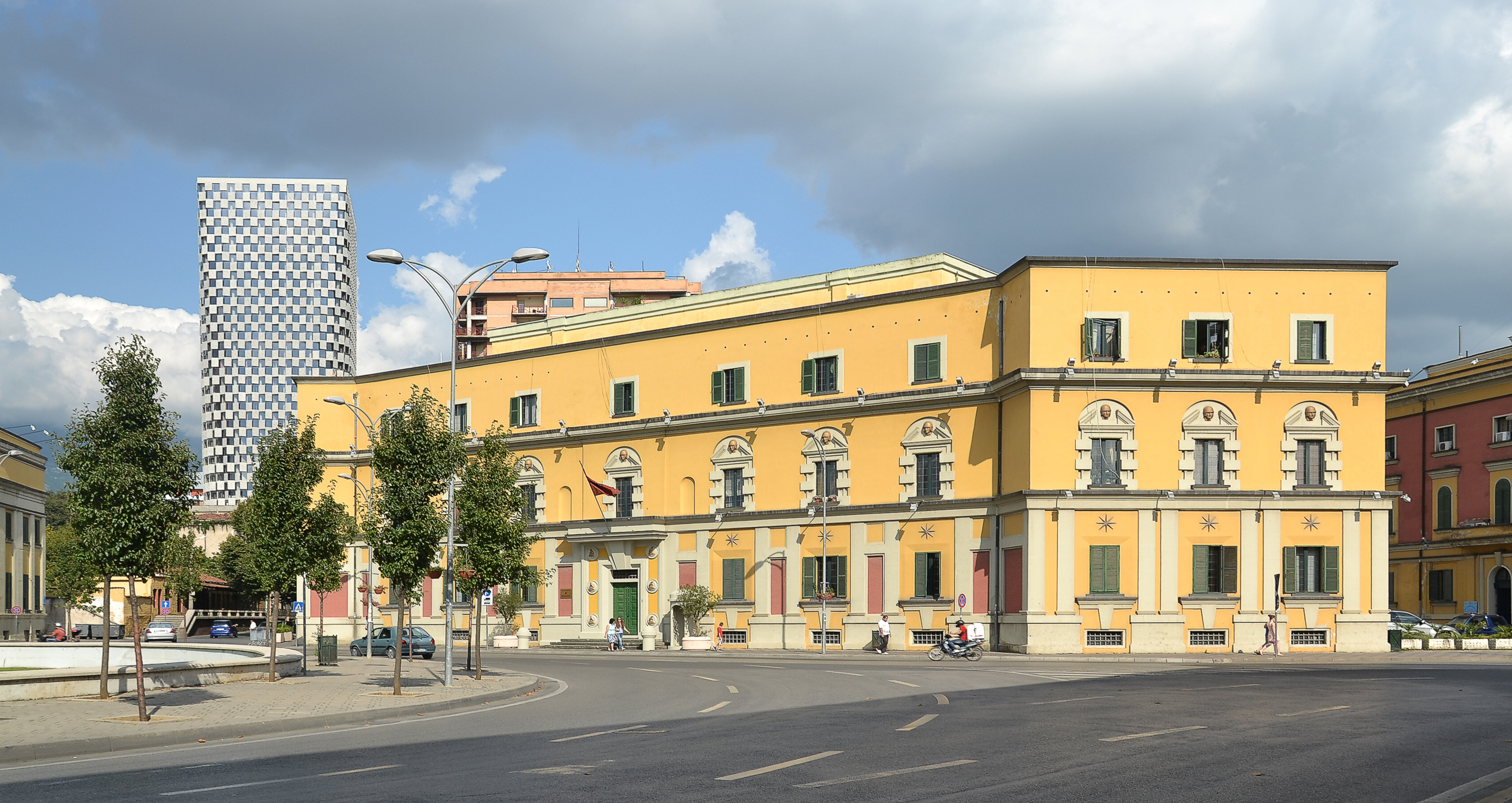

Department overview
- Formed: 20 February 1987
- Dissolved: 13 September 2017
- Superseding Department: Ministry of Infrastructure and Energy
- Jurisdiction: Council of Ministers
- Status: Dissolved
- Headquarters: Tirana, Albania

The Ministry of Transport (Albanian: Ministria e Transportit) was a department of the Albanian Government responsible for the transport, infrastructure, technical standards, water supply and sanitation, and urban waste management.

== History ==
=== Reorganization ===
Since the establishment of the institution, the Ministry of Transport has undergone several administrative changes to its organizational structure. When a new department was formed, it often merged with the ministry thus expanding its role, subsequently leading to the name of the ministry being changed. If that department later broke off as a separate ministry or was dissolved, the ministry reverted to its original name.

- Ministry of Transport (1987–1991)
- Ministry of Transports (1991–1992)
- Ministry of Transports and Communications (1992–1994)
- Ministry of Industry, Transport and Trade (1994–1997)
- Ministry of Public Works and Transport (1997–1999)
- Ministry of Transport (1999–2002)
- Ministry of Transports and Telecommunication (2002–2005)
- Ministry of Public Works, Transport and Telecommunication (2005–2010)
- Ministry of Public Works and Transport (2010–2013)
- Ministry of Transport and Infrastructure (2013–2017)

=== Subordinate institutions ===
- General Directorate of Policy
- Directorate of Transportation Policy
- Directorate of Water Supply and Sewage Policy
- General Directorate of Standards and Monitoring
- Directorate for Licensing and Construction Regulations
- Directorate of Monitoring and Statistics
- Directorate of Traffic and Road Safety
- Directorate of Support Services
- Directorate of Fincance
- General Directorate for Integration
- Directorate for Projects
- Directorate for European Integration.

== Officeholders (1987–2017) ==
No.	Name	Term in office
1	Luan Babameto	20 February 1987	1 February 1989
2	Hajredin Çeliku	2 February 1989	22 December 1990
3	Salvador Franja	22 December 1990	10 May 1991
4	Kostandin Hoxha	11 May 1991	4 June 1991
5	Fatos Bitincka	11 June 1991	6 December 1991
6	Ilir Mati	18 December 1991	13 April 1992
–	Fatos Bitincka	13 April 1992	3 December 1994
7	Albert Brojka	4 December 1994	16 August 1995
8	Suzana Panariti	16 August 1995	1 March 1997
9	Foto Dhuka	11 March 1997	24 July 1997
10	Gaqo Apostoli	25 July 1997	28 September 1998
11	Ingrid Shuli	2 October 1998	20 May 2000
12	Sokol Nako	20 May 2000	20 April 2001
13	Viktor Doda	20 April 2001	6 September 2001
14	Maqo Lakrori	6 September 2001	25 July 2002
15	Spartak Poçi	29 July 2002	10 September 2005
16	Lulzim Basha	11 September 2005	30 April 2007
17	Sokol Olldashi	1 May 2007	12 April 2010
18	Damian Gjiknuri	15 September 2013	13 September 2017

== See also ==
- Transportation in Albania
