= Sokol Olldashi =

Albanian politician (1972–2013)

Minister of Public Works, Transportation and Telecommunications
- In office 2007–2013
- Prime Minister: Sali Berisha
- Preceded by: Lulzim Basha
- Succeeded by: Edmond Haxhinasto

Minister of Public Order
- In office 2005–2007
- Prime Minister: Sali Berisha
- Preceded by: Igli Toska
- Succeeded by: Bujar Nishani

Personal details
- Born: 17 December 1972 Durrës, Albania
- Died: 20 November 2013 (aged 40) Krrabë, Albania
- Party: Democratic Party of Albania
- Education: University of Tirana
- Profession: Politician, journalist, lawyer

Sokol Olldashi (17 December 1972 – 20 November 2013) was an Albanian politician, journalist, and lawyer. A member of the Democratic Party of Albania, he served as Minister of Public Order from 2005 to 2007 and as Minister of Public Works, Transportation, and Telecommunications from 2007 to 2013 in the cabinet of Sali Berisha.

After the Democratic Party's defeat in the 23 June 2013 elections, Olldashi ran for the leadership of the party but lost to Lulzim Basha. He died later that year in a car accident near Krrabë, Albania.

== Early life and education ==
Sokol Olldashi was born on 17 December 1972 in Durrës, Albania. He completed his high school education in his hometown and graduated with a degree in law from the University of Tirana in 1995. In 2004, he attended the Defense College at the Doctrine Command, focusing on National Security Policies, where he graduated with a "Gold Medal".

During his university years, Olldashi was actively involved in the student movements of December 1990, which played a significant role in Albania's democratic transformations.

== Political career ==
=== Member of Parliament ===
Olldashi began his political career with the Democratic Party of Albania and was first elected to the Albanian Parliament in 2001, representing the Durrës region. He was re-elected in 2005, winning in the Shijak constituency.

=== Minister of Public Order (2005–2007) ===
Following the Democratic Party's victory in the 2005 general elections, Olldashi was appointed as the Minister of Public Order on 10 September 2005. He served in this role until 18 January 2007, focusing on law enforcement reforms and efforts to combat organized crime.

=== Minister of Public Works, Transportation, and Telecommunications (2007–2013) ===
In April 2007, Olldashi assumed the position of Minister of Public Works, Transportation, and Telecommunications. During his tenure, he oversaw significant infrastructure projects, including the construction of major roads and improvements in telecommunications. He remained in this role until 2013.

=== 2013 Democratic Party Leadership Election ===
After the Democratic Party's loss in the 23 June 2013 parliamentary elections and the subsequent resignation of party leader Sali Berisha, Olldashi ran for the position of party chairman. He was defeated by Lulzim Basha in the internal party elections.

== Death ==
On the evening of 20 November 2013, Sokol Olldashi died in a car accident near Krrabë, a mountainous area outside Tirana. His vehicle skidded off the road in heavy rain and fell into a ravine.

Olldashi was survived by his wife and two children.

== Legacy ==
Sokol Olldashi is remembered as a prominent figure in Albania's post-communist political landscape. His contributions to infrastructure development and public safety have left a lasting impact on the country's progress.
