= Ministry of Health and Social Welfare (Albania) =

Government ministry of Albania

- Ministria e Shëndetësisë dhe Mirëqenies Sociale

Department overview
- Formed: 23 October 1944; 81 years ago
- Jurisdiction: Government of Albania
- Headquarters: Rruga e Kavajes 25, 1001 Tirana, Albania
- Minister responsible: Klodiana Spahiu
- Website: shendetesia.gov.al

The Ministry of Health and Social Welfare (Albanian: Ministria e Shëndetësisë dhe Mirëqenies Sociale) is a department of the Albanian Government, charged with the responsibility to oversee the running of Albania's healthcare system, including supporting universal and affordable access to medical, pharmaceutical and hospital services, while helping people to stay healthy through health promotion.

== History ==
In 1914 Prince William of Wied built a new structure, entrusting the then Minister of Health Mihal Turtulli. In 1920 with the government of the Lushnja Congress, was established the structure of the General Directorate of Health (DPSH), which functioned as such until 1944.

The Ministry of Health was founded in 1944 when DPSH became a Ministry. The Ministry had its structure with 21 employees and 175 Albanian and foreign doctors practicing the activity throughout the country.

Since the establishment of the institution, the Ministry of Health has been reorganized by joining other departments or merging with other ministries, thus resulting in its name changing several times. This list reflects the changes made in years in pluralist history since 1992 as an institution:

- Ministry of Health and Environment (Albanian: Ministria e Shëndetësisë dhe Mjedisit) from 1992 to 1998
- Ministry of Health (Albanian: Ministria e Shëndetësisë) from 1998 to 2017
- Ministry of Health and Social Protection (Albanian: Ministria e Shëndetësisë dhe Mbrojtjes Sociale) from 2017 - 2025
- Ministry of Health and Social Welfare (Albanian: Ministria e Shëndetësisë dhe Mirëqenies Sociale) 2025 - current

== Subordinate institutions ==
The ministry owns and manages all the public hospitals in Albania

- Albanian Health Insurance Institute
- Public Health Institute
- National Center for Blood Transfusion
- National Center for the Development and Rehabilitation of Children
- Dental Clinic for Undergraduates
- Medical Helicopter Transportation Unit
- National Center for Medicine and Medical Equipment
- Electro Medical Provider
- National Center for Quality Assurance and Accreditation of Health Institutions
- National Center of Education in Continuity

== Officeholders (1944–present) ==
No.	Name	Term in office
1	Ymer Dishnica	23 October 1944	21 March 1946
2	Medar Shtylla	22 March 1946	5 June 1955
3	Ibrahim Dervishi	6 June 1955	24 September 1956
4	Manush Myftiu	4 June 1956	6 February 1958
5	Taqi Skëndi	6 February 1958	6 June 1961
6	Çiril Pistoli	6 June 1961	21 November 1971
7	Llambi Ziçishti	21 November 1971	17 May 1982
8	Ajli Alushani	17 May 1982	19 February 1987
9	Ahmet Kamberi	20 February 1987	21 February 1991
10	Sabit Brokaj	22 February 1991	6 December 1991
11	Kristo Pano	18 December 1991	13 April 1992
12	Tritan Shehu	13 April 1992	14 January 1994
13	Maksim Cikuli	14 January 1994	10 March 1997
14	Astrit Kalenja	11 March 1997	24 July 1997
15	Leonard Solis	25 July 1997	28 November 1999
16	Gjergj Koja	28 November 1999	29 January 2002
17	Mustafa Xhani	22 February 2002	29 December 2003
–	Leonard Solis	29 December 2003	1 September 2005
–	Maksim Cikuli	9 September 2005	1 March 2007
18	Nard Ndoka	1 March 2007	23 July 2008
19	Anila Godo	23 July 2008	16 September 2009
20	Petrit Vasili	16 September 2009	27 June 2012
21	Vangjel Tavo	27 June 2012	3 April 2013
22	Halim Kosova	3 April 2013	14 September 2013
23	Ilir Beqaj	15 September 2013	12 March 2017
24	Ogerta Manastirliu	19 March 2017	21 May 2017
25	Arben Beqiri	22 May 2017	11 September 2017
–	Ogerta Manastirliu	13 September 2017	9 September 2023
26	Albana Koçiu	12 September 2023	19 September 2025
27	Evis Sala	19 September 2025	3 September 2026
28	Klodiana Spahiu	3 September 2026	"Incumbent"

== See also ==
- Healthcare in Albania
- Council of Ministers (Albania)
