= Genc Pollo =

Albanian politician (born 1963)

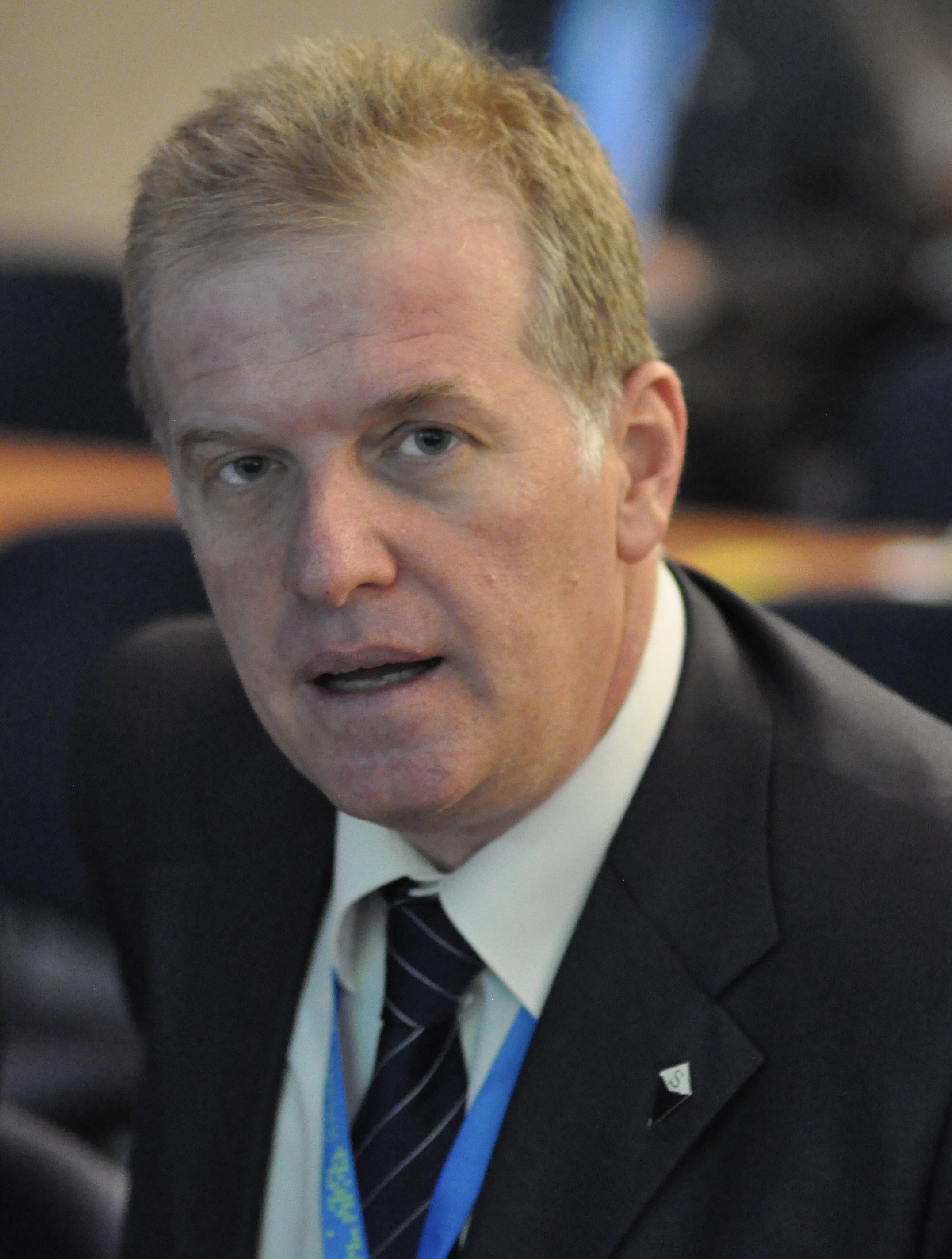

Deputy Prime Minister
- In office 30 July 2008 – 17 September 2009
- President: Bamir Topi
- Prime Minister: Sali Berisha
- Preceded by: Gazmend Oketa
- Succeeded by: Ilir Meta

Member of the Albanian parliament
- In office 1996 – February 18, 2019

Minister of Innovation, Technology Innovation and Communication
- In office September 2009 – September 2013

Personal details
- Born: Genc Pollo; 7 August 1963 (age 62) Tirana, Albania
- Party: Democratic Party of Albania (1990–1999, 2008–Present)
- Other political affiliations: New Democratic Party (1999–2008)
- Spouse: Married
- Relations: Stefanaq Pollo (father)
- Children: 2

Genc Pollo (born 7 April 1963 in Tirana) is an Albanian conservative politician. An Orthodox Christian and trained historian, Pollo was co-founder and first spokesman of the Albanian Democratic Party. He first became a member of the Albanian Parliament in 1996 and has held various ministerial posts since 2005.

== Early life and career ==
Pollo was born in 1963 in Tirana. His father, Stefanaq Pollo was an academic, scholar, professor and historian. After graduating in Historical Studies from the University of Tirana in 1986 he worked as researcher at the Academy of Sciences of Albania for two years and then followed postgraduate studies at the University of Vienna thanks to a scholarship awarded by the Austrian government.

== Politics ==
Pollo participated actively in the founding of the Democratic Party of Albania, the first pro-Western Albanian political party, which successfully contested Communist rule in the first multiparty elections. During 1992 to 1996 he served as an advisor to Sali Berisha, then President of Albania. In 1996 he became a member of the Parliament of Albania. He has held various party and parliamentary senior positions related to education, foreign affairs and European integration. In 2001 he became head of the New Democratic Party. The New Democrat Party became part of the center-right coalition that won the summer 2005 general elections that eventually merged with the Democratic Party. Pollo assumed the portfolio of Minister of Education and Science in the following government. For one year (2008–2009) he had the position of Deputy Prime Minister. From 1996 to 2001 he was also a member of the Council of Europe.

Pollo was reelected as a member of the Albanian Parliament after the general elections, held in June 2009 which reconfirmed a Democratic Party led coalition and was appointed Minister for Innovation and Information Communication Technology in the new Cabinet. Among the policies initiated by Minister Pollo, in Albania, in 2011, the 3G technology will be implemented. As a result of regulation and increased competition in the market Albanians who use mobile phone will receive better services and cheaper prices. In spring 2011 will be implemented the mobile number portability. After equipping all schools with computer labs connected to the Internet, in Albania, 550 post offices across the country have free internet service.

Genc Pollo is married and has two children. He is fluent in four foreign languages, besides his own Albanian (English, German, French, and Italian).
