= New Democratic Party (Albania) =

Former political party in Albania

New Democratic Party Partia Demokrate e Re
- Leader: Genc Pollo
- Founded: 1999
- Dissolved: 2009
- Split from: Democratic Party of Albania
- Merged into: Democratic Party of Albania
- Headquarters: Tirana
- Ideology: Conservatism; Liberal conservatism
- Political position: Centre-right
- European affiliation: European Peoples Party (observer)
- Colours: Blue, Yellow

Website
- pdr-al.org

The New Democratic Party (Albanian: Partia Demokrate e Re) was a centre-right, conservative political party in Albania founded in 1999 as a split from the Democratic Party of Albania. It was led by Genc Pollo.

PDR was part of the Alliance for Freedom, Justice and Welfare coalition. In the parliamentary elections of 2005 PDR won four seats on the proportional list.

The party led by Genc pollo who was the deputy chairman of the Democratic Party. Created The NDP which he claimed to be the alternative choice for those right-wingers who had lost faith in the leadership of the Democratic Party and especially in its leader Sali Berisha. While the NDP had argued against Berisha and the DP. The NDP joined the Berisha I Government. The Party was an observer member of the European People's Party (EPP). October 2008 Genc Pollo and Sali Berisha, Prime Minister and head of the Democratic Party, the senior party in the government coalition, had announced their parties at the time of the elections would merge before the 2009 election. The NDP reunited with the DP again in 2009.

== MPS ==
Deputies from 2001-2005
Dashamir Shehi
Ilirian Barzani
Jak Ndokaj
Nard Ndoka
Saimir Curri
Qazim Tepshi
Deputies from 2005-2009
Genc Pollo
Jak Ndokaj (Later Switched to the PDK)
Tritan Shehu
Frrok Gjini (Later Switched to the PDK)

== Election results ==
Election	Votes	%	Seats	+/–	Government
2001	68,181	5.06 (#3)	6 / 140	0	Opposition
2005	101,373	7.42 (#6)	4 / 140	▲1	Coalition
