= Jozefina Topalli =

Albanian politician (born 1963)

Jozefina Topalli Her excellency
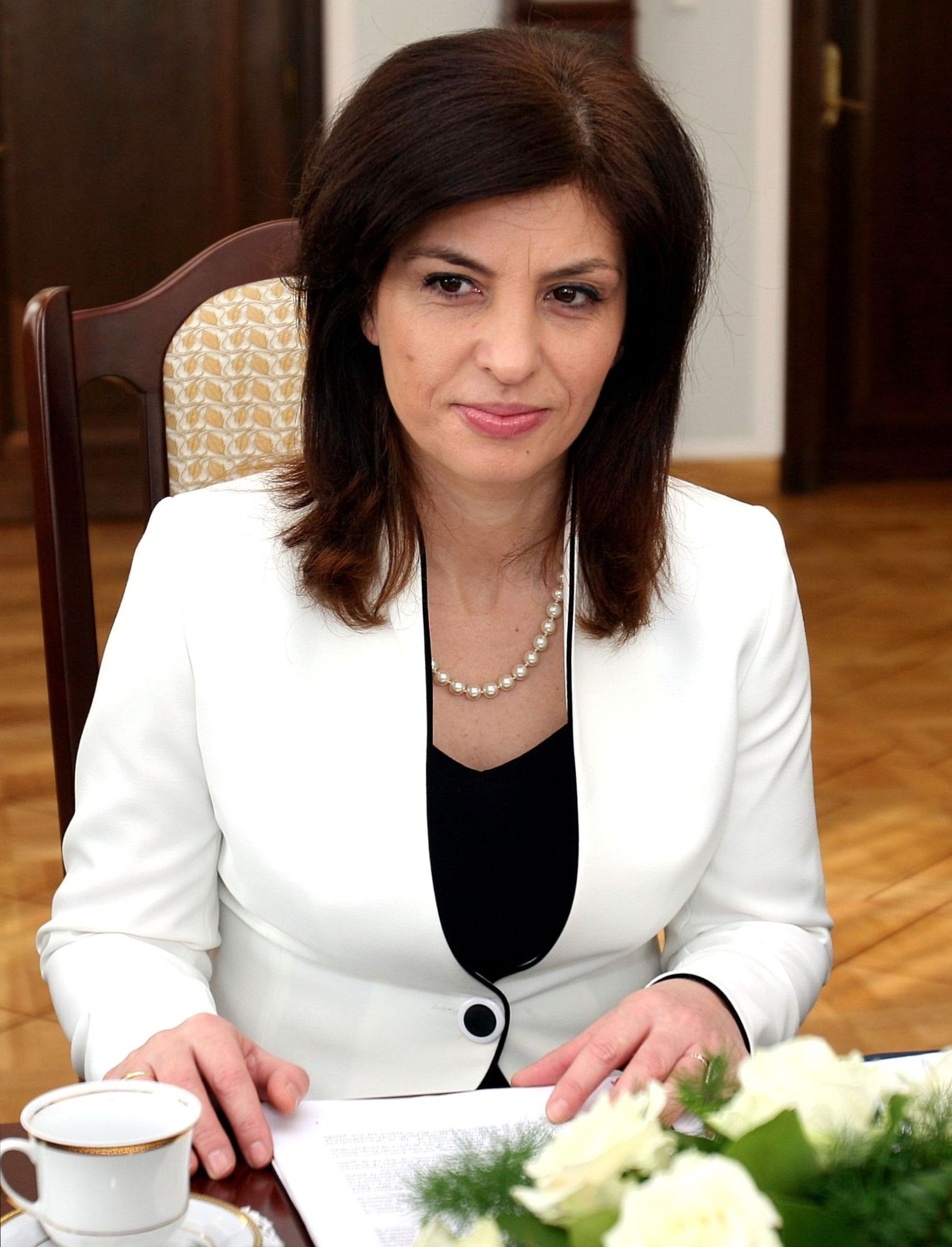

35th Speaker of the Parliament of Albania
- In office 2 September 2005 – 9 September 2013
- President: Alfred Moisiu; Bamir Topi
- Prime Minister: Sali Berisha
- Preceded by: Servet Pëllumbi
- Succeeded by: Ilir Meta

Member of the Parliament
- In office 26 May 1996 – 8 September 2017
- Prime Minister: Aleksandër Meksi; Bashkim Fino; Fatos Nano; Pandeli Majko; Ilir Meta; Pandeli Majko; Fatos Nano; Sali Berisha; Edi Rama

Personal details
- Born: 26 November 1963 (age 62) Shkodër, Albania
- Party: Democratic Party (1996-2017, 2022-present)
- Other political affiliations: Movement for Change (2020-2021)
- Children: Tony Topalli
- Education: Luigj Gurakuqi University; University of Tirana

Jozefina Topalli (née Çoba, born 26 November 1963) is an Albanian politician who formerly served as the Chairwoman of the Parliament of Albania from 2 September 2005 until 9 September 2013. She held the title of vice president of the Democratic Party of Albania.

== Education and early career ==
Jozefina Çoba Topalli graduated from Luigj Gurakuqi University in Shkodra with a double major in mathematics and law. She subsequently studied international relations at the University of Padua in Italy and acquired a master's degree from the University of Tirana in public administration and in European Studies; in 2010, she obtained her Ph.D. at the University of Tirana, with a dissertation on the topic of "The Role of the National Parliament in the process of European integration of the country". She is fluent in English, Russian, French, and Italian.

From 1992 to 1995, she worked at the Chamber of Commerce in the city of Shkodër, and in 1995 and 1996 was chancellor and lecturer at the Luigj Gurakuqi University in Shkodra.

Topalli has been a member of the national legislature since 1996.

In 2005, Topalli was elected President of the Assembly of the Republic of Albania, and retained her position in 2009.

== Political career ==
At the 1996 Albanian parliamentary election, Topalli was elected as member of parliament for the Democratic Party of Albania; she was subsequently re-elected four times. She has been member of the Committee on Social Affairs, Health and Family, and also as Deputy President of the Children's Committee.

Since 1996, Topalli has been Deputy Chair of the Democratic Party of Albania.

=== Speaker of Parliament ===
Topalli is the first woman Speaker of the Albanian Parliament in all the parliamentary history of the country and the sixth Speaker of the Parliament of the Republic of Albania in the pluralistic parliamentary history since 1991. She assumed her duties in September 2005, and was re-elected as Speaker of Parliament for a second four-year mandate in September 2009. In two previous consecutive legislatures (1997–2001; 2001–2005), Topalli served as Deputy Speaker of the Assembly.

In September 2005, in her speech at the oath-taking ceremony as Speaker of the Albanian Assembly, Topalli underlined her steady determination to be an advocate of the opposition, too.

In the framework of parliamentary diplomacy, a novelty the Speaker of the Albanian Parliament brought into Albanian political life, Topalli was engaged in the acceleration of the ratification by the EU states parliaments of the Stabilisation and Association Agreement between Albania and the EU, as well as the NATO protocols for the accession of Albania into the North Atlantic alliance. She continues her lobbying for the recognition of the Republic of Kosovo.

== Awards and recognitions ==
For her successful career and political and parliamentary engagements, in 2010, Topalli was awarded the prized "Mediterranean Award" by the International Mediterranean Forum for Peace, consigned by Sergio De Gregorio, president of the Italian parliamentary delegation to the NATO Assembly.

Topalli was declared the First Ambassador of UNICEF for the protection of children's rights in the country by the UNICEF office in Albania, as well as representatives of NGOs and institutions dealing with children's rights.

For her valuable contribution in politics, Topalli was awarded the "Medal of Honor" by the Chairman of the Legislative Assembly of St. Petersburg, Vadim Tulapanov.

Also, as Speaker of Parliament, Topalli was honored with the international title "Millennium Peace Award: Cavaliere per la Pace" by the International Peace Union, at the Catholic University of Milan.

In April 2012, the Čair Municipality in the Republic of North Macedonia accorded the title "Honorary Citizen" for Ms. Topalli.

== Personal life ==
Topalli is married and has two children.

Political offices
Preceded by Servet Pëllumbi	Chairperson of Parliament; 2005–2013	Succeeded by Ilir Meta
