= Maksim Cikuli =

Albanian politician

Maksim Cikuli (born 7 January 1952) was the Minister of Health of Albania two times. His most recent term of office was from September 2005 until March 2007.

Cikuli is a doctor who has specialized in genetics.
