= Blendi Klosi =

Albanian politician (born 1971)

Blendi Klosi MP
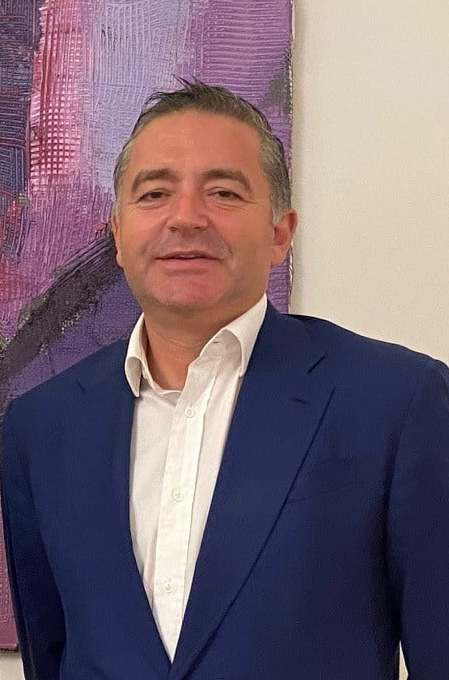

Member of the Albanian Parliament for Berat
- Incumbent
- Assumed office September 9, 2017

Minister of Tourism and Environment
- In office September 13, 2017 – 18 September 2021
- President: Ilir Meta
- Prime Minister: Edi Rama
- Preceded by: Lefter Koka
- Succeeded by: Mirela Kumbaro

Personal details
- Born: 17 January 1971 (age 55) Tirana, Albania
- Party: Socialist
- Spouse: Nora Klosi (Gega)
- Children: Two children
- Education: University of Tirana

Blendi Klosi (born 13 January 1971) is an Albanian Socialist Party politician and the Member of Parliament (MP) for Berat. On 13 September 2017, Klosi was appointed Minister of Tourism and Environment by the 2nd Rama government.

== Early life and education ==
Klosi was born and raised in Tirana, the capital of Albania. He studied for Electronic Engineering at the University of Tirana, where he graduated in 1993. From 1994 he worked as a lecturer for the University of Tirana, leaving in 1996. He worked in 1996 at the Council of Ministers, initially in Department of Public Administration (DAP) and further as assistant of the Prime Minister.

== Parliamentary career ==
Klosi's political career started in January 2000 when he was appointed in the government of Ilir Meta as Deputy Minister from the Ministry of Local Government. He was elected for the first time as a member of the Parliament of Albania in the 24 June 2001 elections as a member of the Socialist Party for the Fier constituency. Klosi held the post of Deputy Minister until June 2002, where after several changes made in the government, he was appointed Minister of Culture, Youth and Sports on 29 December 2003 in the 3rd Nano Government, where he held the office until 1 September 2005.

Although the Socialist Party lost the 2005 general elections, Klosi was re-elected as MP in the same electoral zone, thus becoming one of the 42 MPs of the Socialist Party's parliamentary group for the years 2005-2009. In 2009 general election he was elected MP for the third consecutive time but this time being elected as a deputy in Durrës constituency.

On 23 June 2013, Klosi was elected a member of the Socialist Party for the Durrës constituency. In these elections the Socialist Party together with its allies won an absolute majority of 84 deputies in total, 7 of them in the Durrës district, in which Klosi was candidate. On April 29, 2015, Klosi was appointed Minister of Social Welfare and Youth, replacing Erion Veliaj, who left the office after being elected Mayor of Tirana in the 2015 local elections. In 13 March 2017 Prime Minister Rama communicated the replacement of four ministers, including Klosi, with the argument that they will be included in the election campaign and make possible the Socialist Party's victory in June 2017 elections. Olta Xhaçka was appointed to Klosi's place as Minister of Social Welfare and Youth.

In the 2017 general election, the Socialist Party emerged victorious with an absolute majority. Blendi Klosi as the leader of the list of candidates for the Berat constituency was chosen for the fifth consecutive deputy of the Parliament of Albania. The Socialist Party gained 4 of 7 mandates, 2 mandates won by the Socialist Movement for Integration and 1 mandate from Democratic Party.

On September 13, 2017, Blendi Klosi was appointed Minister of Tourism and Environment, replacing Lefter Koka.

== See also ==
- List of MPs of Parliament of Albania
