= Fatmir Mediu =

Albanian politician (born 1967)

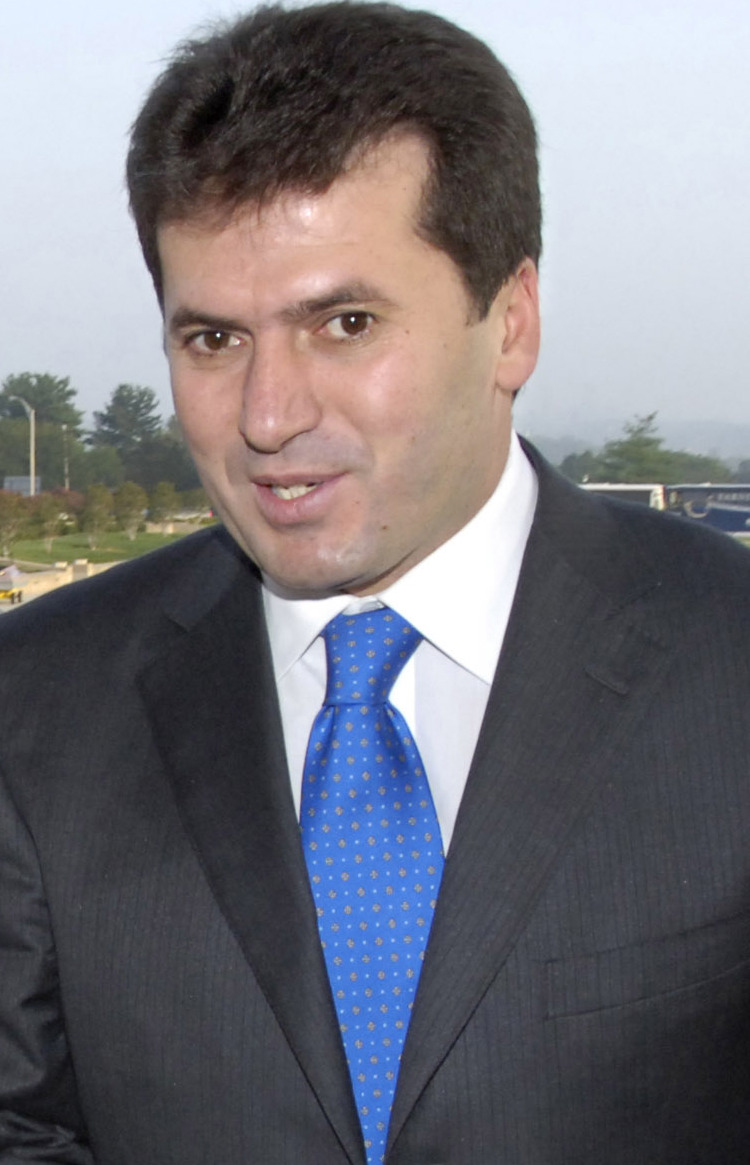
- Fatmir Mediu in 2006 during the meeting with Donald Rumsfeld, then U.S. Defense Secretary

30th Defence Minister of Albania
- In office September 11, 2005 – March 18, 2008
- Prime Minister: Sali Berisha
- Preceded by: Pandeli Majko
- Succeeded by: Gazmend Oketa

Personal details
- Born: 21 January 1967 (age 59) Durrës, People's Republic of Albania (now Republic of Albania)
- Party: Republican Party of Albania
- Profession: Politician

Fatmir Mediu (born 21 January 1967, in Durrës) is an Albanian conservative politician. He is the current Chairman of the Republican Party of Albania, and served as Minister of Defence from September 2005 to March 2008, and Minister of Environment, Forests & Water Administration.

== Early life ==
Mediu was born on 21 January 1967 in Durrës, which was then part of the People's Republic of Albania. In 1990 he graduated from the Faculty of Engineering, Mining, and Geology at Tirana University.

== Political career ==
In 2001, Mediu was elected a member of the Parliament of Albania, a position he held for four consecutive terms. During his time in parliament, he served as Chairman of the Parliamentary Committee on Stability Pact and European Integration, and also served on the committees for foreign affairs, security, and legal issues.

In September 2005 he was elected as Minister of Defence. In March 2008, Mediu resigned from his position as Defence Minister following a military ammunition explosion in Gërdec, a village outside of the capital of Albania. The explosion killed 26 people, injured hundreds, and damaged or destroyed over two thousand homes. He was succeeded by Gazmend Oketa. After several months of investigation in 2022, in January 2023, the Special Structure against Corruption and Organized Crime (SPAK) found that he violated the law during his actions regarding Gërdec. Mediu responded that SPAK did not have any additional evidence since the incident, and that the accusations were politically motivated. He is currently on trial regarding Gërdec, where he is accused of violating Articles 248 and 25 of the Criminal Code alongside Article 70 of the Military Criminal Code. He has continued to repeat accusations that the prosecutors and judges were acting unfairly regarding the face in 2025.

In 2009 he was elected as Minister of Environment, Forests & Water Administration. While Minister of Environment, he quietly oversaw the 2010 Albania floods in the Northern regions of the country, largely caused by poor forest management practices, illegal logging, and heavy rains. He was dismissed from the position in 2013.
