= Rama II Government =

Government of Albania (2017–2021)

- 66th Government of Albania
- 2017‒2021
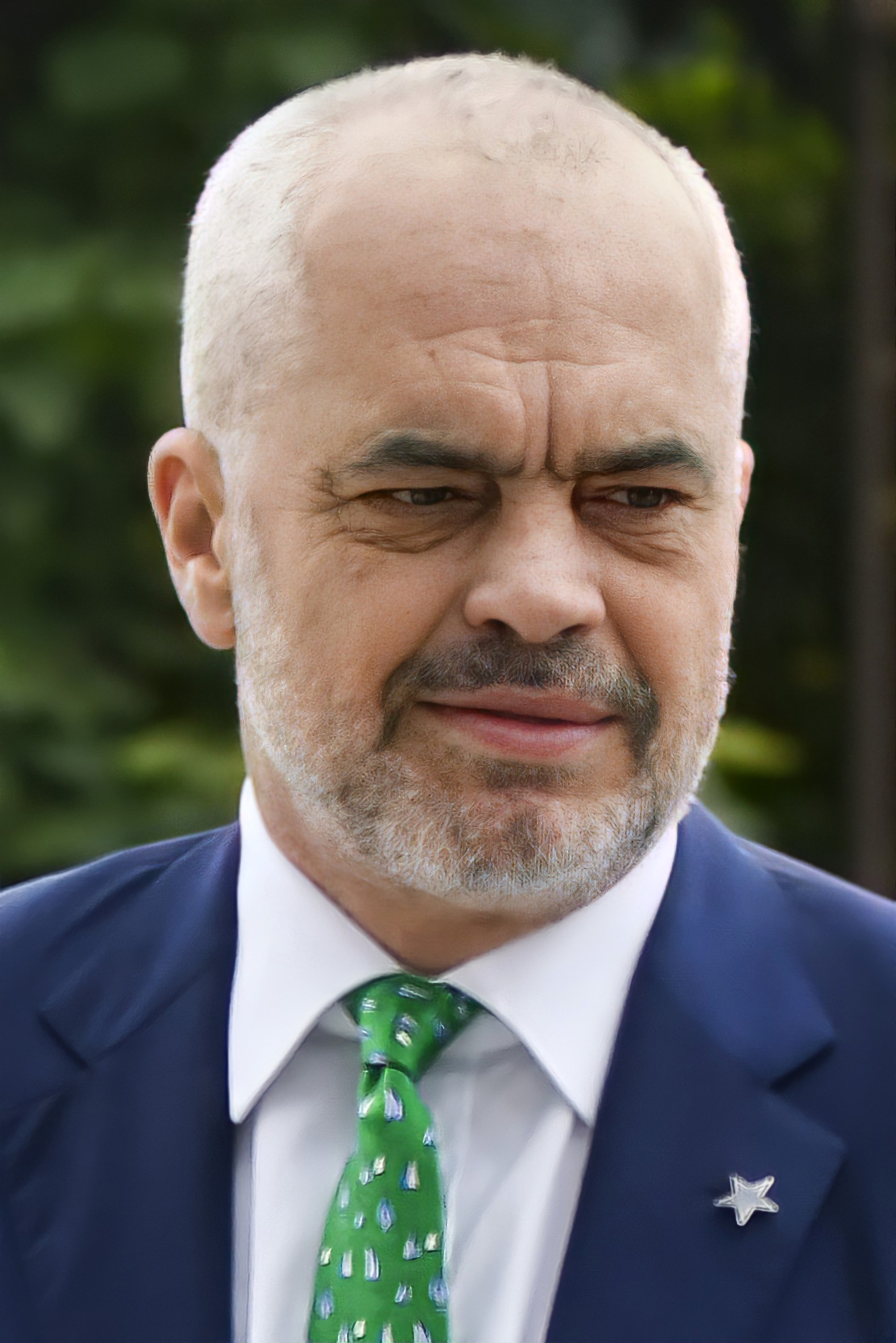
- Date formed: 13 September 2017
- Date dissolved: 18 September 2021

People and organisations
- President: Ilir Meta
- Prime Minister: Edi Rama
- Deputy Prime Minister: Senida Mesi; Erion Braçe
- No. of ministers: 15 (Note: The PM and Deputy Prime Minister are not counted.)
- Total no. of members: 28
- Member parties: PS with support from PSD
- Status in legislature: Majority
- Opposition parties: PD, LSI, PSD, PR, PDIU, PAA, LZHK, PBDNJ
- Opposition leader: Lulzim Basha

History
- Election: 2017 election
- Predecessor: Rama I Government
- Successor: Rama III Government

The second Government of Prime Minister Edi Rama was the 66th ruling Government of the Republic of Albania which was officially mandated by the President on 13 September 2017. Following the 2017 election, the Socialist Party won a majority of seats to Parliament and had the right to form the government without the need of a coalition.

== Changes from previous cabinet ==
The previous government was reduced in size and now it consists of 11 ministries and 2 Ministers without portfolio. Half of the cabinet consists of female ministers. This was a reduction from a previous cabinet with 16 ministries and 3 ministers without portfolio.

The Ministry for Europe and Foreign Affairs absorbed the Ministry of European Integration and the Ministry of Infrastructure absorbed the Ministry of Energy. The Ministry of Finance and Economy took on some of the responsibilities from the dissolved Ministry of Economic Development, Tourism, Trade and Enterprise. Other responsibilities were taken on by the Ministry of Environment, which was renamed. The Ministry of Social Welfare and Youth was dissolved and its roles divided between the Ministry of Health and the Ministry of Education and Sport.

Two "Ministers of State" were created for Diaspora and for Entrepreneurs.

== Cabinet reshuffle ==
On 28 December 2018, PM Edi Rama reshuffled his cabinet with half of his ministers out, in response to the protests that have exposed the scale of popular discontent with his rule. Most Ministers were replaced by the vice ministers.

The cabinet reshuffle consisted of the Vice Prime Minister office, Ministry of Education, Ministry of Infrastructure, Ministry of Economy, Ministry of Foreign Affairs, Ministry of Culture, Ministry of Agriculture and Ministry for Entrepreneurs.

== Cabinet ==
The second Rama Government on the day he took office consisted of 13 ministers, not including the Prime Minister and the Deputy Prime Minister. Among them, were two ministers without portfolio named "Minister of State" (Ministër Shteti) who will be joined by two others at the end of the term.

Cabinet
Portfolio	Minister	Took office	Left office	Party
Prime Minister	Edi Rama	13 September 2017	18 September 2021	PS
Deputy Prime Minister	Senida Mesi	13 September 2017	17 January 2019	PS
Deputy Prime Minister	Erion Braçe	17 January 2019	18 September 2021	PS
Ministry of Finances and Economy	Arben Ahmetaj	13 September 2017	17 January 2019	PS
Ministry of Finances and Economy	Anila Denaj	17 January 2019	18 September 2021	PS
Ministry of Interior	Fatmir Xhafaj	13 September 2017	27 October 2018	PS
Ministry of Interior	Sandër Lleshaj	23 November 2018	17 December 2020	PS
Ministry of Interior	Bledar Çuçi	18 December 2020	18 September 2021	PS
Ministry of Defence	Olta Xhaçka	13 September 2017	31 December 2020	PS
Ministry of Defence	Niko Peleshi	4 January 2021	18 September 2021	PS
Ministry for Europe and Foreign Affairs	Ditmir Bushati	13 September 2017	18 January 2019	PS
Ministry for Europe and Foreign Affairs	Edi Rama through Deputy Minister Gent Cakaj	22 January 2019	31 December 2020	PS
Ministry for Europe and Foreign Affairs	Olta Xhaçka	4 January 2021	18 September 2021	PS
Ministry of Justice	Etilda Gjonaj	13 September 2017	18 September 2021	PS
Minister of Infrastructure and Energy	Damian Gjiknuri	13 September 2017	17 January 2019	PS
Minister of Infrastructure and Energy	Belinda Balluku	17 January 2019	18 September 2021	PS
Ministry of Education, Sports and Youth	Lindita Nikolla	13 September 2017	17 January 2019	PS
Ministry of Education, Sports and Youth	Besa Shahini	17 January 2019	17 September 2020	PS
Ministry of Education, Sports and Youth	Evis Kushi	24 September 2020	18 September 2021	PS
Ministry of Agriculture and Rural Development	Niko Peleshi	13 September 2017	17 January 2019	PS
Ministry of Agriculture and Rural Development	Bledar Çuçi	17 January 2019	17 December 2020	PS
Ministry of Agriculture and Rural Development	Milva Ekonomi	18 December 2020	18 September 2021	PS
Ministry of Health and Social Protection	Ogerta Manastirliu	13 September 2017	18 September 2021	PS
Ministry of Culture	Mirela Kumbaro Furxhi	13 September 2017	17 January 2019	PS
Ministry of Culture	Elva Margariti	17 January 2019	18 September 2021	PS
Ministry of Tourism and Environment	Blendi Klosi	13 September 2017	18 September 2021	PS
Minister of State for Entrepreneurship Protection	Sonila Qato	13 September 2017	17 January 2019	PS
Minister of State for Entrepreneurship Protection	Eduard Shalsi	17 January 2019	18 September 2021	PS
Minister of State for Diaspora	Pandeli Majko	13 September 2017	18 September 2021	PS
Minister of State for Relations with Parliament	Elisa Spiropali	17 January 2019	18 September 2021	PS
Minister of State for Reconstruction (Note: It was established after the 2019 earthquake to deal with the reconstruction of damage caused to infrastructure, housing, and compensation to people affected by the disaster.)	Arben Ahmetaj	20 December 2019	18 September 2021	PS

== Notes ==
Preceded by Rama I	Government of Albania; 2017–2021	Succeeded by Rama III
