= 2018–2019 student protests in Albania =

2018–2019 Second Students Movement in Albania
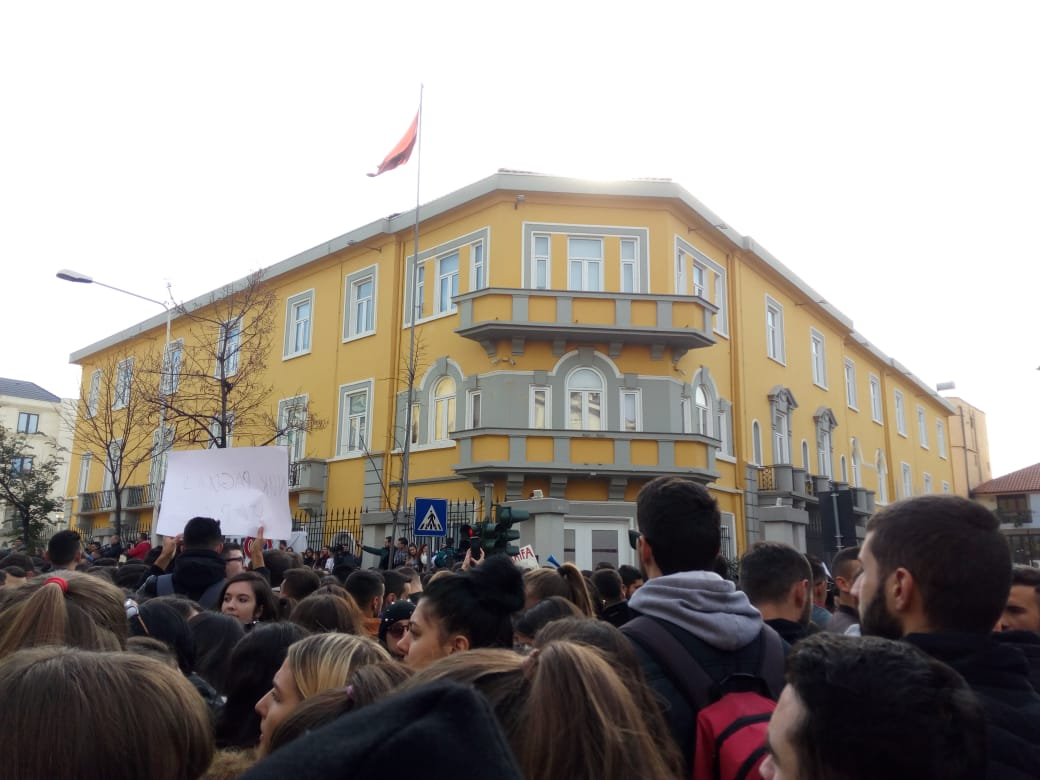
- Date: 4 December 2018 – 11 February 2019
- Location: Albania
- Caused by: High tuition fees in public universities, living conditions in dormitories and students' involvement in decision-making
- Goals: Growth 5% GDP for education system; 50% vote of students in Senate Academy; Resign of Board Member Administration of Universities; Lower tuition fees; Better living conditions in dormitories; Vetting for university officials; Abrogation of the Higher Education Law
- Methods: Street protesters; Occupations; Boycotting lessons; Online activism

Parties
(Albania) Albanian students	Government of Albania: Ministry of Education, Sports and Youth of Albania

Lead figures
Marlin Muça Xhuljan Guçe, Malbor Duka, Kurtish Rexhmati, Enrik Shehu	(Albania) Edi Rama (Albania) Lindita Nikolla (until 12 December 2018) (Albania) (Kosovo) Besa Shahini (28 December – 2 February)

Number
20,000 students	unknown

Casualties
- Injuries: 25 people are notified for a penal process from the Albanian Police

The 2018–2019 student protests in Albania were a series of street protests, demonstrations and online activism events held by the students of the public universities from December 2018 until February 2019, to oppose the high tuition fees. Students across Albania rallied against the moves that were made by the Albanian government to increase the cost of university education, by introducing new fees for exams. The fee comes on top of the dramatically risen university fees, which have failed to lead to any improvement in public education.

== The protest ==
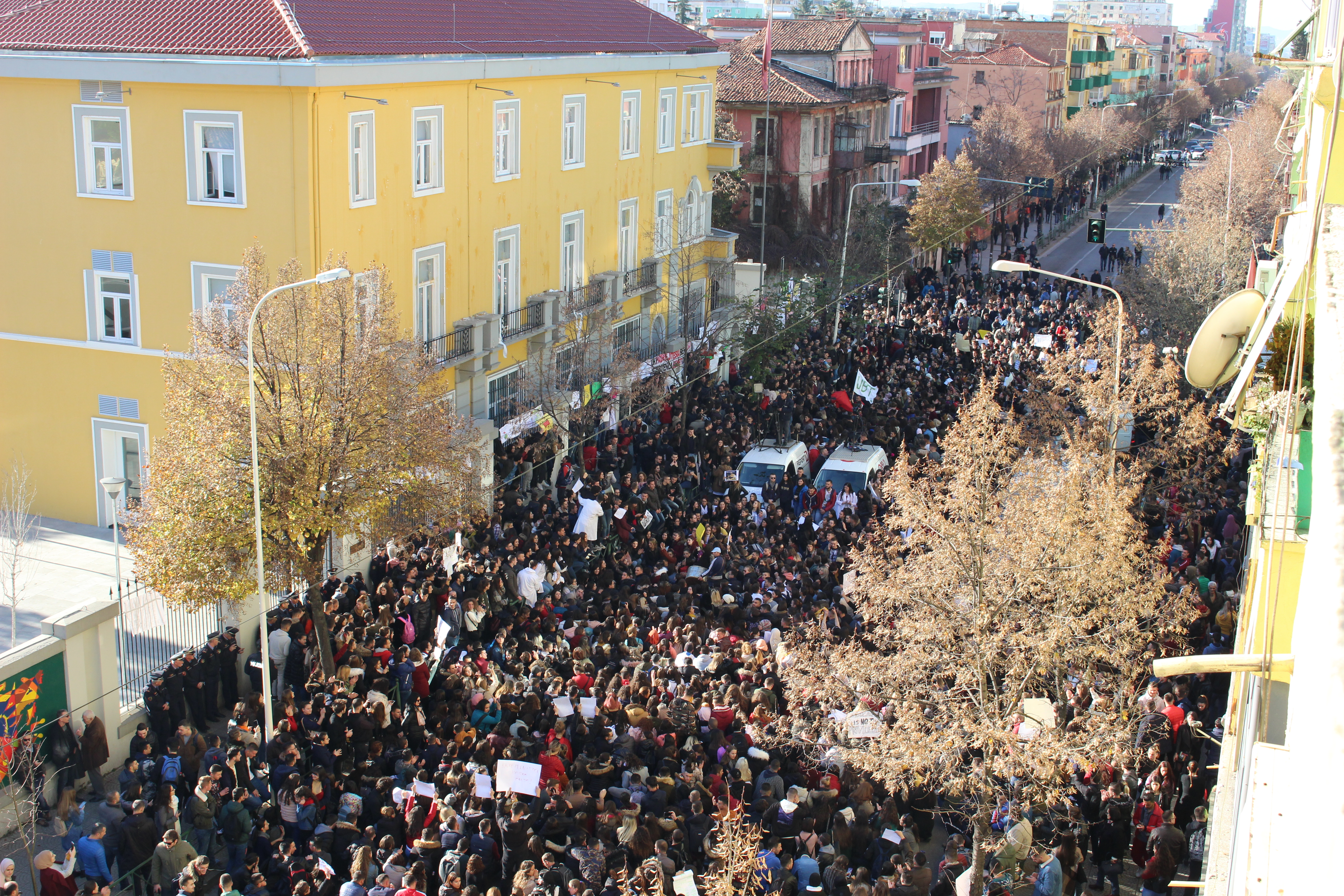
Protesters outside the Ministry of Education

Protests started on 4 December by the students of the Faculty of Architecture and Urbanistics of the Polytechnic University of Tirana and many other joined during the third day of the protest on 7 December.

The aim of the protest was to pressure the government to ratify and fulfill the eight demands proposed by the Albanian Student Council in order to alleviate the high cost of education and improve the miserable state in which the public dormitories are established and rest.

Thousands of students across Tirana boycotted the lessons and marched from their faculties towards the Ministry of Education, Youth and Sports' Building demanding the Ministry to cut off the tuition fees and the annulment of the government's decision on the additional fee for resit exams, together with other requirements like better living conditions in dormitories and a bigger involvement of students in the decision-making process. It was the biggest protest the country had seen in years.

Students from the public universities in other cities like Durrës, Shkodra, Elbasan and Korça also joined the student protests that started in Tirana by boycotting the lectures and rallying in the streets.

On the 2nd day of the protest, the Education Minister Lindita Nikolla declared that the government's decision on higher fees would be nullified, but the students decided to continue the protests for their other demands.

The protest continued in the following weeks and the students, organized through social media, sent an official letter to the government with 8 non-negotiable demands. The protest was also supported by professors of public universities, other public figures and citizens.

The students demanded the abrogation of the law for higher education, considering it as the main source of most problems they face today. At first, the Prime Minister offered some concessions regarding the abolition of tuition fees for excellent students and those from families in need and also employment opportunities in the public administration, which were immediately rejected. According to protesters, it does not make sense to provide alternative concessions instead of addressing the root cause.

== Government changes ==
The Prime Minister started a tour of public universities, to talk with students about their problems. He started his tour in the Agricultural University of Tirana. Most students rejected the meetings and many of them left the room while the Prime Minister was talking. His request for dialogue was also rejected during the protest and in many television shows.

On 28 December, Edi Rama reshuffled his cabinet with half of his ministers out, including the Education Minister, in response to the protests that have exposed the scale of popular discontent with his rule. The National Assembly of his governing Socialist Party gathered and there, Rama insisted that the changes were "not the result of failures". He blamed a "weak opposition" for many problems together with the media, which he has also previously called "garbage bins" for not seeing the economic success achieved by his government and blamed his own party officials for creating what he called "a caste".

== Plagiarism scandal ==
One of the reasons why students continued to protest, was also the huge plagiarism scandal that involved many public figures, mainly politicians and professors of public universities. The denouncement of cases of plagiarism started in October, when Taulant Muka, a young epidemiologist educated in the Netherlands, has waged a crusade against the "fake" PhDs held by many politicians and government functionaries.

In spite of the media attention to this phenomenon, which for years had been informally known, only one official involved has been dismissed. The scandal also accused the Minister of Education of having an average grade of 5.8 out of 10, which is really low for students in Albania. Some receipts of her high school diploma were leaked and no action was taken.

Officials accused of plagiarism:

- Ervin Demo - Deputy Ministry of Education, Sports and Youth (resigned)
- Blerina Gjylameti - Socialist Party MP
- Ogerta Manastirliu - Minister of Health and Social Protection
- Mimi Kodheli - Former Minister of Defense and MP
- Monika Kryemadhi - Chairwoman and MP of the opposition party Socialist Movement for Integration
- Taulant Balla - Socialist Party MP
- Miranda Karçanaj - Director of the National Information Society Agency (AKShI)
- Ditjona Kule - Professor at the Faculty of Economics
- Kseanela Sotirofski - Rector of the University of Durrës

== Public universities occupation ==
After resuming their protests in January, students decided to continue boycotting the lesson and to occupy their faculties, organizing debate forums and reading groups, until their requirements would be met. On 9 January, students of two faculties, the Faculty of Law and the Faculty of Economics, spent the night inside the auditoriums.

On 11 January, the police entered inside the faculties and there were cases of physical confrontation between the students and police officers. The boycott continued during January in most Faculties, with professors joining the protests and approving the students' requests.

== Outcomes ==
The Government after reshuffling the cabinet and annulling the laws, which raised tuition for students who had to retake exams, cut the tuition fees in half for all students for the following academic year and announced that it would continue to help excellent students through a monthly pay and through reducing fees in the future. Some dormitories went through renovations while many requests were still left unanswered.
