= National Diaspora Agency (Albania) =

Government agency of Albania

- Agjencia Kombëtare e Diasporës

Agency overview
- Formed: 22 November 2017
- Jurisdiction: Council of Ministers
- Headquarters: Tirana, Albania
- Parent department: Minister of State for Diaspora
- Website: akd.gov.al

The National Diaspora Agency (AKD) (Albanian: Agjencia Kombëtare e Diasporës) is a state body within the Albanian Government responsible for relations with the Albanian diaspora. It advocates for the rights and interests of Albanian citizens in other countries. The agency is under the supervision of the Minister of State for Diaspora, Pandeli Majko.

At the head of the institution is the Steering Council, consisting of seven members. The members are representatives from the Ministry of Diaspora; Ministry of Foreign Affairs; Ministry of Internal Affairs; Ministry of Finance and Economy; Ministry of Education, Sports and Youth; Ministry of Culture; as well as by the Central Election Commission.

AKD prepares periodic reports for the Assembly and the Council of Ministers on the diaspora activity, which may be funded from various donations and projects.

== See also ==
- Albanian Diaspora Summit
