= Foreign relations of Russia since the Russian invasion of Ukraine =

On 24 February 2022, Russia launched a large-scale invasion, prompting the imposition of substantial economic and political sanctions by the EU, the UK, the US, Canada, and other countries. The Russian government has a specified "Unfriendly Countries List" which indicates those countries with which relations are now strained (or non-existent). A Foreign Policy Concept approved by president Vladimir Putin in 2023 identified Russia as a Eurasian civilization state; aligning the country more closely with Asia, the Islamic world, Africa, Latin America, and the rest of the Global South. Russia is also seeking the end of the Western hegemony in the international order.

== Europe ==
=== Positive relations ===
==== Abkhazia (Note: Abkhazia's status is disputed. It is internationally recognized in whole as part the country of Georgia. Abkhazia is recognized as independent by five UN member states as well as four partially or wholly unrecognized states.) ====
President Aslan Bzhaniya stated that Russia's invasion was "absolutely justified."

==== Artsakh (Republic of Artsakh) (Note: Artsakh (or the Nagorno-Karabakh Republic) was a self-proclaimed breakaway state in the South Caucasus, whose territory is internationally recognised as part of Azerbaijan. The territory's existence came to an end on 31 December 2023.) ====
President of Artsakh Arayik Harutyunyan welcomed Russia's declaration of the independence of the Donetsk and Luhansk People's Republics. The Artsakh government sent 14 tons of humanitarian aid to the residents of the Kyiv and Zaporizhzhia regions.

==== Azerbaijan ====
The government of Azerbaijan has taken a relatively neutral position on the conflict, and maintained cooperation with both Moscow and Kyiv owing to its security, political, and economic ties and dependence on regional players.

Azerbaijan President Ilham Aliyev has previously expressed his support for the territorial integrity of Ukraine, and urged his Ukrainian counterparts to "never to agree to the violation of your territorial integrity". He offered to organize talks between Ukraine and Russia, instructed Azerbaijan's State Oil Company SOCAR to provide free fuel to Ukraine's ambulances and State Emergency Service and sent humanitarian aid to Ukraine.

Before the war, Russia and Azerbaijan signed a joint wide-ranging political-military agreement which President Aliyev described as bringing "relations to the level of an alliance", and the two countries later entered into a new intelligence-sharing agreement. However, relations between the two countries have since declined significantly, and have been described as "probably their worst crisis since Azerbaijan gained independence in 1991", following the Russian downing of passenger plane Flight 8243, as well as tensions over the Azerbaijani-Armenian border and other tensions.

In April 2026, Ukrainian president Zelenskyy visited Azerbaijan where he signed agreements with President Aliyev on enhanced co-operation between the two countries, including in the areas of the defence-industry, regional security, and the energy sector.

==== Belarus ====
In February 2022, Russian forces were permitted to stage part of the invasion from Belarusian territory. President Alexander Lukashenko stated that Belarusian troops could take part in the invasion if needed. Belarus stated that Russia could bring its nuclear weapons onto Belarusian soil. In March 2022, Oleksandr Kamyshin, head of Ukrainian Railways, said that the railway connection between Ukraine and Belarus had closed, so Russian equipment from Belarus could not be delivered. On 25 March 2023, Russian president Vladimir Putin announced that Russia would station tactical nuclear operations in Belarus.

==== Serbia ====
While condemning the invasion, Serbia refused to back sanctions against Russia. Serbia did not impose sanctions. Serbian President Aleksandar Vučić said the National Security Council concluded the Republic of Serbia considers "very wrong the violation of territorial integrity of a number of countries including Ukraine." Vučić also said that he would condemn Russia's recognition of the independence of separatist regions in eastern Ukraine only if Zelenskyy condemned the NATO bombing of Yugoslavia in 1999 on public television.

Serbian Foreign Minister Nikola Selaković said that "Russia was Serbia's biggest support in its battle to preserve its territorial integrity and sovereignty and avoid the stigmatisation of the entire Serb people." Serbian Interior Minister Aleksandar Vulin stressed that Serbia would not join NATO: "While Aleksandar Vučić is the head of the state, you should have no dilemma as to what our attitude toward the NATO alliance is." Serbia expressed regrets over events, describing both Russia and Ukraine as friendly states and underlining full support for the Ukraine's territorial integrity. The initial weak response by the government was criticised by some commentators in the country and the region.

The Serbian organization Women in Black organised anti-war demonstrations in Belgrade, and the Serbian Orthodox Church organised a collection of humanitarian aid.

On 2 March Serbia voted 'yes' to the UN's resolution condemning the Russian attack on Ukraine.

On 16 May Serbia signed the "Tirana declaration" and deplored in the strongest terms the illegal and unjustified aggression by the Russian Federation against Ukraine in violation of Article 2(4) of the UN Charter.

The Economist classified Serbia as "neutral".

==== South Ossetia (Note: South Ossetia's status is disputed. It is internationally recognized in whole as part of the country of Georgia. South Ossetia is recognized as independent by five UN member states as well as four partially or wholly unrecognized states.) ====
The Ministry of Foreign Affairs issued a statement: "The Republic of South Ossetia expresses its support for the decision of the Russian Federation to conduct the special military operation to protect the residents of Donbas from the current nationalist regime of Kyiv." On 26 March 2022, South Ossetian President Anatoly Bibilov began sending troops to Ukraine to assist Russia with the invasion.

==== Transnistria (Note: Transnistria's political status is disputed. It considers itself to be an independent state, but this is not recognised by any UN member state. The Moldovan government and the international community consider Transnistria a part of Moldova's territory.) ====
On 26 February, President Vadim Krasnoselsky, asserted that Transnistria was a peaceful state and never had plans to attack its neighbours. Krasnoselski noted the large ethnically Ukrainian population in Transnistria and that Ukrainian is taught in Transnistrian schools and is one of its official languages.

=== Other relations ===
==== Armenia ====
The Armenian MFA spokesman on 23 February expressed "hope that the existing problems between the two friendly states would be resolved through diplomatic dialogue", and declared Armenia's readiness to accept refugees. On 1 June 2023, during an interview, prime minister of Armenia Nikol Pashinyan stated, "Armenia is not an ally of Russia in the war in Ukraine."

==== Bosnia and Herzegovina ====
Tripartite Presidency Member Željko Komšić said Bosnia would support Ukraine. Croat and Bosniak members of the tripartite presidency, Željko Komšić and Šefik Džaferović, issued separate statements condemning the Russian invasion. The Serb member Milorad Dodik did not, instead stating that Bosnia and Herzegovina was neutral. He'd said the previous day that events showed it was good that Bosnia and Herzegovina had not joined NATO, and that the country would not support sanctions. Foreign Minister Bisera Turković said: "Bosnia and Herzegovina remains firmly committed to Ukraine's sovereignty and territorial integrity, and we call for an immediate end to fighting and shelling! OSCE principles, security and international law are under attack today. Hostility and suffering of innocent civilians must end immediately". Turković called on Russia and Belarus to refrain from using force in the interests of peace, and regional and global stability.

Dodik repeatedly visited Russia, including attending Eastern Economic Summit.

==== Hungary ====
Prime Minister Victor Orban had made strong arguments related to NATO expansion to the East, and stated that Ukraine never could join either EU nor NATO. Orban defended Russia and Hungarian relations. Hungary was one of a few European countries to maintain relations with Russia, despite many sanctions or obstacles faced between bilateral relations of Russia and Hungary.

==== Slovakia ====
Prime Minister Eduard Heger stated that "The Russian imperialism has been restored in front of our eyes in its aggressive, militant form" and about Russian president Vladimir Putin added "All victims of this war will be his victims and he will be responsible for them in the eyes of the global public." On 24 February 2022, Bratislava Castle and the seat of President of Slovakia Grassalkovich Palace in Bratislava was lighted in blue and yellow in solidarity with Ukraine. Slovakia provided Ukraine with an S-300 air defense system.

==== Turkey ====
On 3 February 2022, President Recep Tayyip Erdoğan volunteered to organize a Ukraine-Russia conference during a visit to Ukraine, as EU leaders increased outreach to the Kremlin to calm worries of a Russian invasion. On 24 February, Erdoğan expressed his support for Ukraine. On 25 February, on the other hand, the Republic of Turkey abstained from voting on Russia's suspension from the Council of Europe, instead calling for open dialogue between the parties under any circumstances. Turkish Foreign Minister Mevlut Cavusoglu reiterated Turkey's "readiness to host negotiations that could take place between the Russian Federation and Ukraine".

On 27 February 2022, Cavusoglu shifted its terminology to refer to Russia's assault on Ukraine as a "war," and committed to enforce elements of the 1936 Montreux Convention's international pact that allowed Turkey to prohibit all warships of the belligerent forces, including those of the Russian navy, from entering the Bosporus and Dardanelles and thus hinder Russian vessels' transit from the Mediterranean to the Black Sea. On 28 February, Erdoğan confirmed that the straits would be closed to prevent escalation, while pledging to maintain relations with both Ukraine and Russia. On 10 March, Russian Foreign Minister Sergei Lavrov and Dmytro Kuleba met in Antalya in Turkey, the first high-level contact between the two sides since the invasion. Turkish Foreign Minister Mevlut Cavusoglu also participated. Mr Cavusoglu said the aim of the diplomatic meeting was "to pave the way," for a meeting between the Russian and Ukrainian presidents, which would be facilitated by Turkey's president.

Turkey actively participated in mediation efforts. Ukraine asked both Israel and Turkey to set up talks with Russia.

Turkey had been providing Ukraine with Bayraktar drones since 2019, which played a significant role in deterring Russian advances in the early stages of the invasion, but did not impose sanctions on Russia.

On 17 March 2022, Cavusoglu expressed hope for a humanitarian ceasefire in the southern Ukrainian port city of Mariupol, where he claimed more than 100 Turkish citizens remained.

On 20 March 2022, Cavusoglu stated that Russia and Ukraine were close to agreement on "important" issues, and that he hoped for a ceasefire.

==== Vatican City ====
Pope Francis stated that the events in Ukraine had caused "great pain in his heart". The Pope called for 2 March, Ash Wednesday, to be a day of prayer and fasting for peace. In an unprecedented departure from diplomatic protocol, the Pope went to the Russian embassy on 25 February to relay his concern.

The Pope said to Russian youth, "Never forget your heritage. You are the descendants of great Russia: the great Russia of saints, rulers, the great Russia of Peter I, Catherine II, that empire – educated, great culture and great humanity. Never give up on this heritage." This comment was received negatively by the government of Ukraine.

=== Strained relations ===
==== European Union ====
The EU launch a group of sanctions against Russia, which added all EU countries to the list of "unfriendly nations".

==== Albania ====
In mid February 2022, Lavrov accused Albania and two other Balkan countries of sending mercenaries to the Donbass conflict in Ukraine. The claims were rejected by Albanian officials.

Albanian President Ilir Meta, Prime Minister Edi Rama, Minister for Europe and Foreign Affairs Olta Xhaçka, and Ambassador to the UN Ferit Hoxha made statements condemning the invasion. Russia's recognition of the separatist regions in the Ukrainian Donbass as independent was condemned by Albania as a violation of the Minsk Protocol, international law, and of Ukraine's statehood and borders.

In late February 2022, Albania and the US tabled a co-written resolution condemning the invasion at the UN Security Council, but Russia vetoed it. Albania cosponsored another resolution with the US for an emergency General Assembly session. The resolution passed. At the session, Albania voted in favour of a successful resolution that condemned the invasion and demanded its withdrawal from Ukraine.

Albania imposed sanctions on Russia targeting close political and business Putin associates, on sectors related to energy, finance, technology and transport, and denying access to Russian aircraft. The name of a Tirana street where the Russian embassy sits was changed to "Free Ukraine" by Mayor Erion Veliaj. These actions led to Russia including Albania on its official list of "unfriendly countries". Albania's honorary consulate in Kharkiv was shelled and destroyed by Russian forces. There were no casualties as its staff had evacuated the building.

In mid March, Albania and five other countries at the UN Security Council accused Russia of war crimes. In Albania, President Meta, Foreign Minister Xhaçka and the Speaker of Parliament Lindita Nikolla all condemned Russia for the Bucha massacre and called for an international response and independent investigation. Albania voted for a successful UN General Assembly resolution to suspend Russia from the UN Human Rights Council. In late September 2022, Russia vetoed a UN Security Council resolution tabled by Albania and the US opposing the Russian annexation of occupied areas.

==== Austria ====
Austria supported the EU sanctions, while maintaining its military neutrality. Austria joined other countries in spring 2022 in declaring a number of Russian diplomats persona non grata.

==== Belgium ====
Belgium joined other countries in spring 2022 in declaring a number of Russian diplomats persona non grata.

==== Bulgaria ====
On 24 March 2022, the Bulgarian prime minister recalled the Bulgarian ambassador in Moscow for consultations, in the wake of "undiplomatic, sharp and rude" comments reportedly spouted by the Russian ambassador to Bulgaria, Eleonora Mitrofanova.

On the evening of 27 June the Russian embassy in Sofia launched a charity appeal for Bulgarians to support the invasion. One day later, Petkov announced the expulsion of 70 Russian diplomats over concerns of espionage. The Ministry of Foreign Affairs closed its diplomatic mission in Yekaterinburg and expected Russia to halt the activities of its own mission in Ruse, Bulgaria. All Russian embassy services were halted. Bulgaria stipulated that Russia must conform to the official standard of limiting their numbers to 23 diplomatic staff and 25 administrative staff. Misinformation promulgated by Russia in Bulgaria was countered by the government.

Russia is suspected of an explosion at an arms factory in June 2023, which followed similar incidents at arms depots housing ammunition meant for export to Ukraine. In June 2023 Bulgaria began to sell weapons to Ukraine and in July endorsed a decision to join the European Defence Agency's Collaborative Procurement of Ammunition project in support of Ukraine. Prime Minister Nikolai Denkov stated "Russia must definitely withdraw from the territory of Ukraine, recognize its borders, and be held accountable for the crimes it has committed," at a July meeting with Zelenskyy.

Bulgaria took over the Rosenets oil terminal at the port of Burgas, run by Lukoil, ending its long term concession.

==== Croatia ====
Croatia declared multiple Russian diplomats persona non grata.

President Zoran Milanović made pro-Russian statements, stating in January 2023 "Crimea will never again be part of Ukraine". In January 2023 Croatia joined the Schengen Area then requiring Russian citizens to apply for a visa to enter Croatia.

A Russian drone crashed in Zagreb, in March 2022.

==== Cyprus ====
Cyprus supported EU actions.

==== Czech Republic ====
The Czech embassy in Moscow were limited to 19 Russian employees.

==== Denmark ====
The self-governing Faroe Islands, although not part of the EU, implemented similar sanctions. In April 2022, Denmark expelled 15 Russian diplomats from Denmark, and the following month Russia expelled 4 Danish diplomats and 3 other Danish embassy workers from Russia. Relative to its GDP, Denmark donated among the most to Ukraine (combined military and humanitarian aid).

==== Estonia ====
Estonia joined other countries in declaring a number of Russian diplomats persona non grata. Estonia banned Russian language media channels.

In September 2022, Poland, Lithuania, Latvia, and Estonia closed entry for Russian citizens with Schengen visas, including those issued by third countries.

On 18 October 2022, the Estonian parliament voted to officially recognize Russia as a terrorist state. The Riigikogu called on the international community to adopt a similar position.

On 6 December 2022 suspected FSB officer Vadim Konoshchenok was arrested at the border with high tech electronic items and ammunition sourced in the US. Additional goods were found in a warehouse Konoshchenok was renting. The USA sought his extradition, which was granted and completed in July 2023.

In January 2023, Estonian Foreign Ministry spokesman Mihkel Tamm announced Estonia's intention to seize $21.4 million in Russian assets in Estonia and deliver it to Ukraine. Estonia worked with European Commission on plans to seize Russian assets frozen in the European Union which are estimated to be in the hundreds of billions of dollars.

Estonia announced the expulsion of 21 Russian diplomats and technical staff in January 2023 and encouraged other European Union countries to follow suit. In response, Russia downgraded its relations with Estonia and expelled the Estonian ambassador, Estonia responded in kind.

==== Finland ====
On 6 June 2023 Finland expelled nine Russian diplomats, believed to be working for an intelligence service. In July 2023 Russia ordered the closure of Finland's St Petersburg consulate and expelled nine diplomats. Entry into Finland for Russian citizens was indefinitely limited.

Finland would end up joining NATO.

==== France ====
On 5 June 2022, French finance minister Bruno Le Maire stated that France was in talks with the United Arab Emirates, to replace Russian oil imports.

After Macron took power in France, Russian-French relations remained at a standstill. According to Macron, "the war will continue" and he urged the French people "to prepare for the scenario where we all have to go without Russian gas." Macron's government urged a "sobriety plan" to conserve energy.

==== Georgia (Georgia (country)) ====
President Salome Zourabichvili stated that "We are participating in all kinds of international financial sanctions and that's quite something for the Georgian financial sector. At the same time, we are participating in all the international resolutions that have been taken to support Ukraine. We share [with Ukraine] a common two-century history of Russian aggression and we know what that means"

The Georgian government contributed 1 million GEL from its reserve budget to help Ukrainians harmed by Russia's military assault. Prime Minister Irakli Garibashvili made the decision and signed the decree authorizing the aid. The funding was for medical supplies for Georgia's Ministry of Internally Displaced Persons, Labor, Health, and Social Affairs.

On 24 February, the Chairman of the Parliament of Georgia Shalva Papuashvili expressed his solidarity with Ukraine and called on the international community to take steps to "stop Russia escalating into a full-scale conflict and ensure the protection of international norms."

On 27 February 100 tons of humanitarian aid were delivered to Ukraine via Poland.

On 4 March, The Georgian Health Ministry declared that all Ukrainian citizens in Georgia would receive free emergency medical services.

Garibashvili said that Georgia's government could not impose separate sanctions against Russia.

Vice Prime Minister/Minister of Foreign Affairs of Georgia, David Zalkaliani stated that "Military aggression launched by Russia against Ukraine is totally intolerable". He called on international partners to give a strict response to the violation of international law by Russia and ensure the de-escalation of the situation.

A Parliamentary delegation visited two Ukrainian cities where Papuashvili opposed Russia's invasion. The opposition United National Movement (UNM), Georgia's main opposition party, paid a surprise visit to Kyiv on the same day, sending a separate delegation that included party chairman Nika Melia and former Georgian President Giorgi Margvelashvili.

==== Germany ====
The 2022 invasion led to a near complete reversal of German-Russian relations under the new German Chancellor, Olaf Scholz. He ordered the immediate transfer of thousands of missiles to the Ukrainian military.

Germany was dependent on Russia for natural gas and was less willing to sanction that sector. Germany agreed to halt the Nord Stream 2 gas pipeline. The pipeline provided a significant portion of Germany's petroleum imports. Russia gradually reduced flows of gas. The pipeline was attacked on 26 September, ending transport.

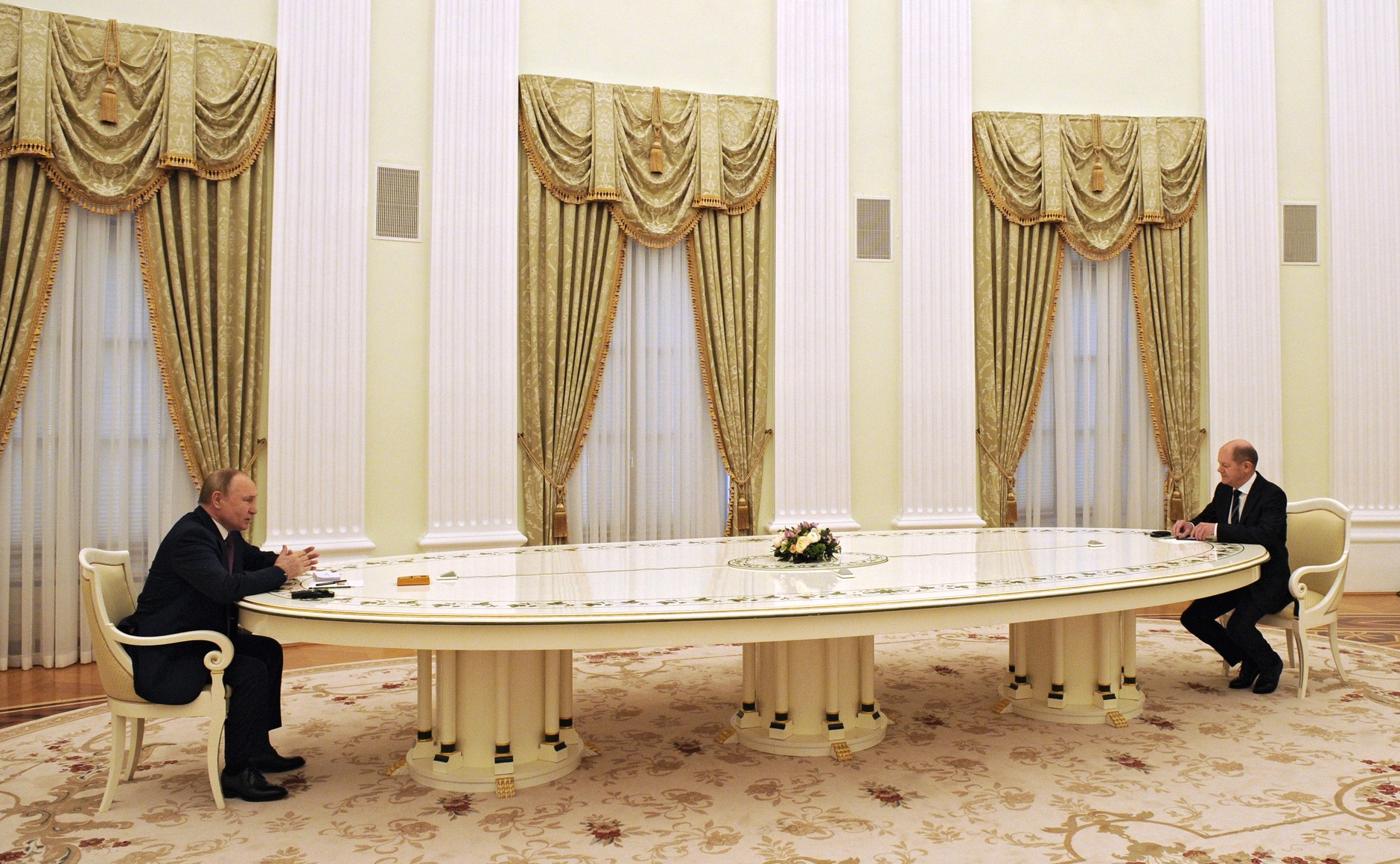
Putin's hypochondria on display as he meets with German chancellor Olaf Scholz on 15 February 2022

Germany joined other countries in spring 2022 in declaring a number of Russian diplomats persona non grata.

In April 2022, the German government said it would send 1 billion euros in military aid to Ukraine. On 17 May 2022, German Finance Minister Christian Lindner said he is "politically open to the idea of seizing" the frozen foreign-exchange reserves of the Central Bank of Russia to offset the costs of rebuilding Ukraine after the war. Russian Deputy Foreign Minister Alexander Grushko remarked that it would amount to "complete lawlessness", and that the measure would hurt Germany if adopted.

German Riol Chemie GmbH was alleged to have illegally delivered chemicals to Russia, including a precursor for Novichok.

In late 2022, Germany announced its first trade deficit since 1991, after it halted permits for Nord Stream 2, and introduced a Russian oil embargo. The country suffered an acute energy shortage. The government offered subsidies to protect households from soaring energy bills. In fall 2022, Russia had halted gas flows via the Nord Stream 1 pipeline several times, blaming sanctions, while the value of the Euro slipped against all major currencies until February 2023. Russia blamed the United States for Germany's energy crisis, by pushing its leaders towards a "suicidal" step, despite previous Russian-Ukrainian gas disputes disrupting Russia's natural gas supply to Europe in 2006 and 2009.

The discussion on the legitimacy of economic sanctions against Russia had a significant impact on Germany's political landscape. Parties to the right (AfD) and to the left (Die Linke) split on whether economic sanctions were effective to stop the conflict, and how they impacted the German economy. The right wanted to support the Nord Stream 2 pipeline, while leftists have voiced similar concerns with regard to Germany's economic viability.

In April 2023, Germany expelled 50 Russian diplomats, reportedly to "reduce the presence of Russian intelligence in Germany". Russia responded by expelling 34 German diplomats, stating that Germany "continues to demonstratively destroy the entire array of Russian-German relations". In May 2023, the German Foreign Ministry stated that hundreds of Germans would be expelled from Moscow at the beginning of June, after Russia capped the number of German workers in the country.

==== Greece ====
President Katerina Sakellaropoulou said that Greece "strongly condemn[s] the Russian attack on an independent country".

Prime Minister Kyriakos Mitsotakis condemned the "revisionist" actions of Russia against Ukraine.

==== Iceland ====
Prime Minister Katrín Jakobsdóttir condemned Russia's invasion as "an unacceptable breach of international law."

==== Ireland (Republic of Ireland) ====
President Michael D. Higgins called the Russian invasion "unacceptable and immoral" and stated: "This violence must stop."

Taoiseach Micheál Martin condemned Russia's "outrageous" actions.

Tánaiste Leo Varadkar stated that while Ireland is militarily neutral, "in this conflict, Ireland is not neutral at all", acknowledging the country's "unwavering and unconditional" support for Ukraine. He compared the invasion to the invasion of Czechoslovakia in 1939, calling Putin "the Hitler of the 21st century".

==== Italy ====
Prime Minister Mario Draghi promised "whatever it takes to restore Ukrainian sovereignty" and said it was "impossible to have meaningful dialogue with Moscow", demanding Russia unconditionally pull its forces back to the internationally established borders.

Italy opened a diplomatic channel to resolve the crisis.

Initially, Italy was opposed to sanctions, partly because they were much more damaging economically for Italy than for Russia.

Italian public opinion was shocked by the invasion, because it considered this war unjustified and unjustifiable. The significant presence of Ukrainian immigrants in Italy joined demonstrations for peace and to ask for support from Italy.

Italy joined other countries in declaring a number of Russian diplomats persona non grata.

==== Kosovo ====
Kosovo

Prime Minister Albin Kurti condemned the Russian invasion as "the largest military aggression, not only in Europe, since the end of the Second World War", stating "we stand in solidarity with the people of Ukraine and stand together with the EU, NATO, the US, and the UK for state sovereignty, territorial integrity, the country's independence and the right of self-determination for the people of Ukraine", alongside condemnations by the Kosovar parliament. President Vjosa Osmani said that the people of Kosovo supported Ukrainians "as they face an unprovoked war as a result of Russian aggression". A joint statement by Kosovo's president, prime minister and senior ministers furthermore condemned attempts to draw parallels to Kosovo's own declaration of independence from Serbia.

==== Latvia ====
President Egils Levits condemned the invasion, calling for "all possible support, including weapons" to Ukraine and "the harshest possible sanctions" against Russia. In a later interview he called the invasion the "beginning of the end for Putin". On 26 February, the Ministry of Foreign Affairs of Latvia suspended issuing visas to Russian nationals with the exception of humanitarian visas. Two days later, Saeima approved legal amendments allowing Latvian nationals to voluntarily fight on the Ukrainian side. On 4 March, Riga City Council renamed a section of the street in front of the Russian Embassy to Ukrainian Independence Street. Prime Minister of Latvia Krišjānis Kariņš expressed that the Latvian economy and exports should continue to transition away from Russia, and the dependence on Russian energy imports should be reduced as soon as possible.

==== Liechtenstein ====
Liechtenstein condemned the invasion.

The government promised CHF 500,000 from its existing International Humanitarian Cooperation and Development Budget to humanitarian projects for those affected by the war.

==== Lithuania ====
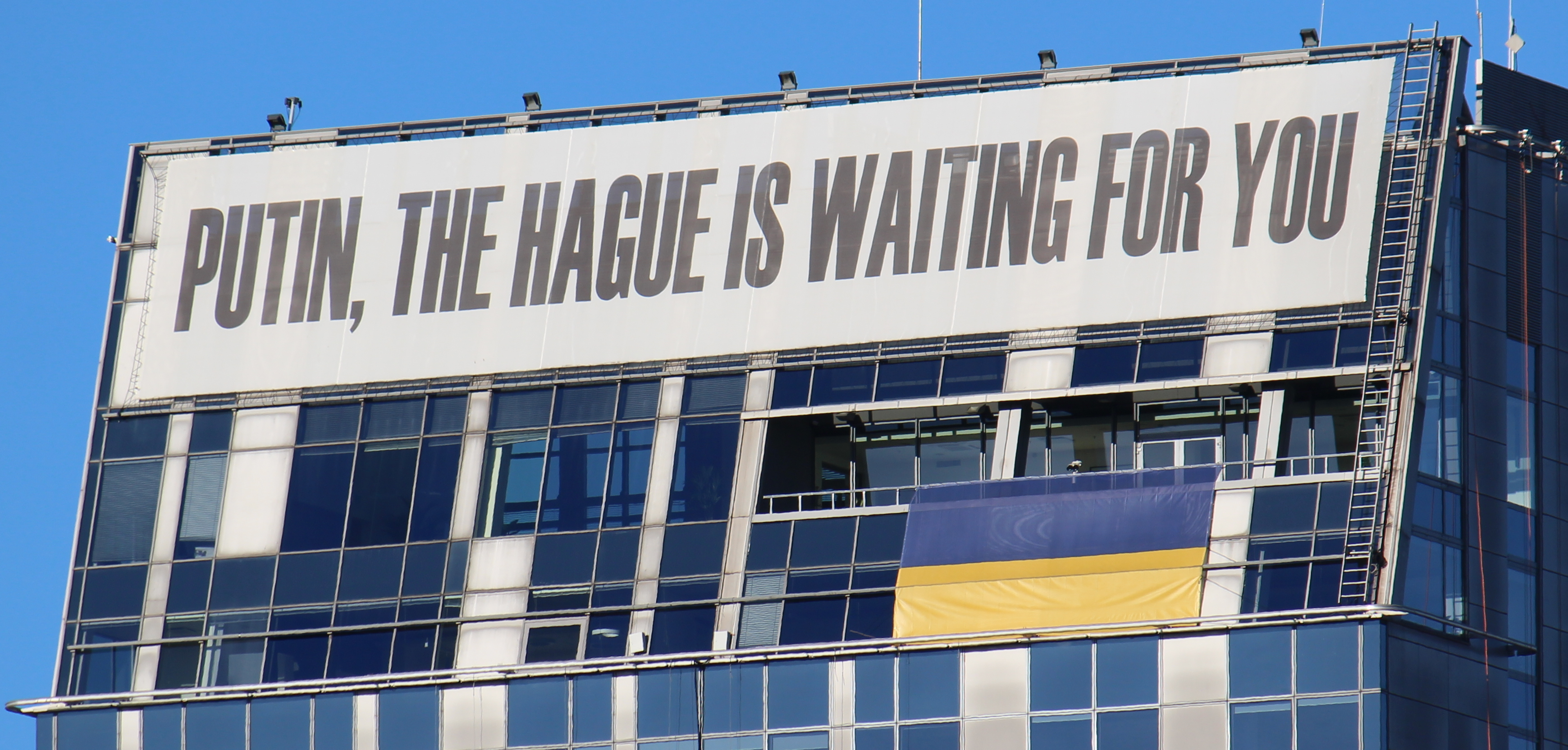
Message on the Vilnius City Municipality building

Lithuania condemned the invasion and called for military, economic and humanitarian aid. President Gitanas Nausėda declared a state of emergency and requested NATO to activate the Article 4 on joint consultations on 24 February 2022.

Lithuania expelled four Russian diplomats. On 4 April, in response to the Bucha massacre, Lithuania expelled the Russian ambassador and closed the consulate in Klaipėda. In April 2022, the Russian government withdrew its consent for the Consulate-General of Lithuania in Saint Petersburg.

On 10 May, Lithuania's Seimas voted unanimously to describe Russia's actions in Ukraine as constituting terrorism and genocide. In response, Leonid Slutsky stated that the resolution was part of an "anti-Russia project", accused Lithuania of Russophobia and said that "the level of relations with Lithuania has already been lowered significantly".

On 8 June 2022 Russian parliamentarian Yevgeny Alexeyevich Fyodorov submitted a bill to repeal Russia's recognition of Lithuania's independence. He thought that in this way the other two Baltic states might have their independence reversed too." Towards the end of June, Lithuania announced that it would block the transport of Russian goods through their territory. Russia criticised Lithuania for this.

In September 2022, Poland, Lithuania, Latvia, and Estonia decided to end entry for Russian citizens with Schengen visas, including those issued by third countries. In 2022, around 4,000 Russian citizens applied for a residence permit in Lithuania, while 38 had their permanent residence permit revoked over security concerns.

In December 2022, diplomatic relations between Lithuania and Russia were downgraded to the level of acting chargé d'affaires after the Russian ambassador was expelled and the Lithuanian ambassador recalled.

In August 2023, following a survey, Lithuania announced that 254 Russian and 910 Belarusian citizens living in Lithuania posed a threat to national security and that their residence permits will be revoked.

==== Luxembourg ====
Prime Minister Xavier Bettel condemned the invasion.

==== Malta ====
Prime Minister Robert Abela said that during the meeting of European leaders Malta had "spoken in favour of peace in Ukraine", adding that doing so "did not compromise Malta's position of neutrality", as Malta's constitution affirms the island as a neutral state adhering to a policy of non-alignment.

==== Moldova ====
President Maia Sandu condemned the invasion, calling it "a blatant breach of international law and of Ukrainian sovereignty and territorial integrity." She added that Moldova was ready to accept tens of thousands of people fleeing Ukraine after the Russian attack and vowed to keep its border open.

==== Monaco ====
Prince Albert II affirmed his support for Ukraine in a statement: "The Principality reaffirms its support of international laws, and to the sovereignty, the integrity and the independence of states." and "Monaco is at the side of the Ukrainian population and human rights."

Minister of State Pierre Dartout said that Monaco was on the side of the Ukrainian people.

The Monaco Royal Palace said "The Principality has adopted and implemented, without delay, procedures for freezing funds and economic sanctions identical to those taken by most European States."

==== Montenegro ====
President Milo Đukanović condemned the Russian invasion, saying it "violates all fundamental principles of international law, undermines European security, and endangers its stability." Deputy Prime Minister Dritan Abazović tweeted that Montenegro stands with NATO and EU partners.

==== Netherlands ====
Prime Minister Mark Rutte condemned Russia's actions, saying that "one country and one man are responsible", while calling for "maximum sanctions". King Willem-Alexander and Queen Máxima stated that their "hearts go out to the people of Ukraine and everyone affected by the violence." The Dutch royal family announced it would host six to eight families of refugees from Ukraine from mid-April at Het Oude Loo.

==== North Macedonia ====
President Stevo Pendarovski condemned the Russian invasion as "an attack on the territorial integrity and sovereignty of Ukraine, blatant violation of the basic principles of international law, attack on the democratic order and a threat to the stability of Europe."

Prime Minister Dimitar Kovačevski announced his government's readiness to receive refugees from Ukraine if the situation there deteriorated further.

==== Norway ====
Prime Minister Jonas Gahr Støre assured that Norway "condemns Russia's military attack on Ukraine in the strongest possible terms".

==== Poland ====
Before the invasion, Polish Prime Minister Mateusz Morawiecki warned that Putin was seeking to rebuild the Russian Empire and urged Europe to unite and stop him. On 22 February, after Putin declared the independence of the Donbas, Prime Minister Morawiecki called the action "an act of aggression". Polish leaders urged European powers to adopt strong financial sanctions against Russia. Morawiecki singled out Germany's Nord Stream 2 gas pipeline from Russia as "harmful and dangerous."

On 24 February, Morawiecki tweeted, "We must immediately respond to Russia's criminal aggression on Ukraine Europe and the free world has to stop Putin."

On 26 February, the Polish Football Association announced that it would not participate in a planned 24 March World Cup qualifying match against the Russian squad in Moscow. Poland joined other countries in many Russian diplomats persona non grata.

On 9 May, during VE Day, Russian Ambassador to Poland Sergey Andreev was splashed with red liquid by protestors, as he arrived at a Soviet military cemetery for wreath-laying ceremony. The protestors prevented the Russian delegation from laying the wreath and shouted "murderers" and "fascists" at them, before the police escorted Andreev and his delegation away. Russian Foreign Ministry spokeswoman Maria Zakharova denounced the attack and called the protestors "young neo-Nazis", and demanded that Poland organize the wreath-laying ceremony. Polish Minister of Interior and Administration Mariusz Kaminski defended the protestors.

A survey from 22 June reported that only 2% of Poles held a favourable view of Russia, while 97% were unfavourable, the most negative views of Russia among all countries included in that survey. The 2% view was a collapse from previous polls, which for the prior two decades had about 20–40% of Poles expressing a favourable view.

In September 2022, Poland, Lithuania, Latvia, and Estonia closed entry for Russian citizens with Schengen visas.

In October 2022, the Senate of Poland recognized Russia as a terrorist state.

On 2 November 2022, Poland's Minister of National Defence Mariusz Błaszczak announced the construction of a barrier along the border with Kaliningrad, to prevent Russia from using the border to transport African and Asian immigrants to Europe.

==== Portugal ====
Prime Minister António Costa "vehemently condemns the military action triggered by Russia today on Ukrainian soil".

==== Romania ====
President Klaus Iohannis condemned the, invasion, stating that "Romania, together with the entire international democratic community, rejects this irresponsible behaviour that undermines the foundations of international relations and the current order of international law" and that Romanian citizens should leave Ukraine as soon as possible.

On 13 March 2022, an unarmed Russian Orlan-10 reconnaissance drone crashed in the Romanian village of Tărpiu.

Starting in late April 2022, Russian hacking group Killnet launched a series of cyberattacks against Romanian government and other official websites. This followed a visit from Romanian authorities to Kyiv promising more support for Ukraine.

A poll in Romania showed disapproval of Russia rose from 37% in 2021 to 79% in 2022.

On 22 June 2023, Ukraine destroyed a bridge at Chonhar connecting Crimea with Russian-occupied parts of southern mainland Ukraine. Following this, Vladimir Saldo, the Russian-appointed governor of occupied Kherson Oblast, threatened that Russia would destroy bridges in Odesa in Ukraine along with a bridge connecting Giurgiulești in Moldova with Galați in Romania. Prime Minister Marcel Ciolacu condemned Saldo's threats. He described Kherson Oblast as illegally occupied by Russia and stated that striking civilian infrastructure is a war crime.

==== Slovenia ====
Prime Minister Janez Janša condemned Russia's "unprecedented military aggression against Ukraine" and demanded that Russia immediately withdraw its military, reaffirming Slovenia's support of Ukraine. The national flag of Ukraine was hung from the Slovenian Parliament in Ljubljana as a symbol of solidarity and brotherhood.

==== Spain ====
Prime Minister Pedro Sánchez condemned the "intolerable military actions of the Russian government in Ukrainian soil" after holding a meeting of the Spanish National Security Council.

Minister of Foreign Affairs José Manuel Albares called the attack "unjustifiable" and a "blatant violation of international law", and announced that Spain was coordinating with EU partners and NATO allies. Minister of Defence Margarita Robles asked for "really severe" sanctions and called Russian actions "of an extraordinary gravity" but noted that no NATO troops would enter Ukraine as the country "is not a NATO member".

On 27 February, Spanish Defence Minister Margarita Robles announced a 20-ton shipment of military equipment to Ukraine and advanced the request to send the frigate Blas de Lezo in conjunction with a NATO mission.

==== Sweden ====
Prime Minister Magdalena Andersson stated that "Sweden condemns in the strongest terms Russia's ongoing invasion. Russia's acts are also an attack on the European security order. It will be met by a united and robust response in solidarity with Ukraine. Russia alone is responsible for human suffering.".

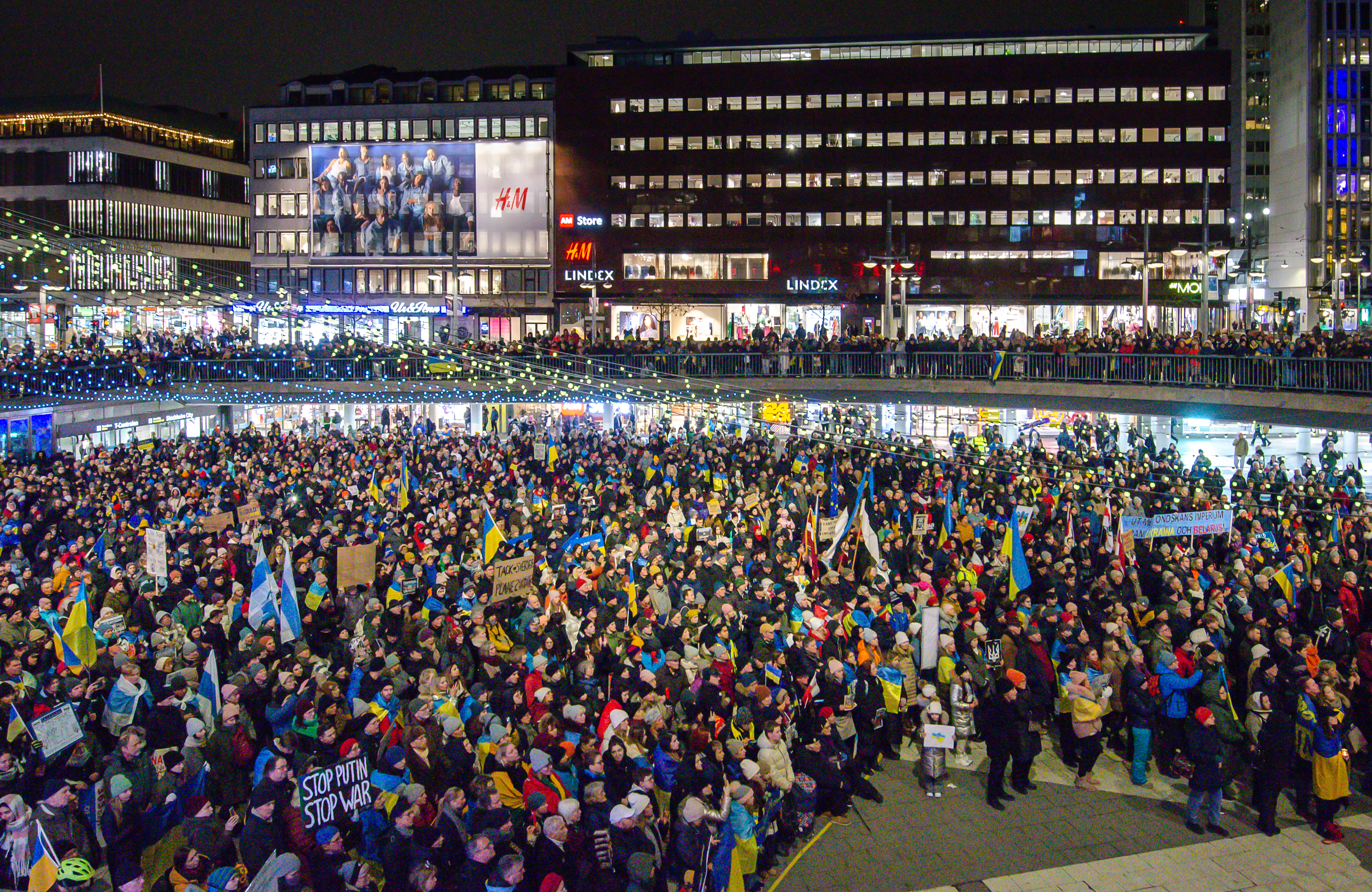
Demonstration on the anniversary of the invasion in Stockholm, 24 February 2023

Sweden joined other countries in spring 2022 in declaring Russian diplomats persona non grata.

In 2023, it summoned Russia's ambassador to complain about a statement on the embassy's web site according to which joining NATO made the Nordic countries "a legitimate target for Russian retaliatory measures, including those of a military nature".

A YouGov poll showed that in February 2023, 63% of respondents in Sweden wanted to support Ukraine in a war with Russia until Russian troops leave all occupied territories.

Sweden joined NATO on 7 March 2024.

==== Switzerland ====
The Swiss foreign ministry called Russia's actions an "invasion" and a "gross violation of international law", while Swiss President Ignazio Cassis announced that the country would support EU sanctions on travel and finance but would still not impose sanctions of its own. However, the Swiss Federal Council reversed course on 28 February, announcing that Switzerland was imposing the same sanctions on Russian assets as the European Union. Exempt from these sanctions were payments for energy raw materials. According to Cassis, the decision was unprecedented but consistent with Swiss neutrality. The Ukraine Recovery International Conference took place in Lugano, Switzerland on 5 July 2022, to finance the rebuilding of the war-torn nation.

==== United Kingdom ====
Members of the royal family donation to the Disasters Emergency Committee (DEC) Ukraine Humanitarian Appeal and other groups.

Prime Minister Boris Johnson said "President Putin has chosen a path of bloodshed and destruction by launching this unprovoked attack". Secretary of State for Defence Ben Wallace described Russia's actions as "naked aggression against a democratic country".

Gibraltar – "Today's actions by Russia, launching a full-scale invasion of a sovereign, democratic nation without any provocation or reasonable excuse, is nothing short of appalling. None of us expected to witness such unforgivable aggression in Europe in our lifetimes. Gibraltar therefore joins with the Prime Minister of the United Kingdom, leaders of other nations and people around the world in condemning this action in the most strident terms", said Chief Minister Fabian Picardo. Picardo called for a ban of the Russian state-controlled television network RT on 25 February; television providers in Gibraltar agreed to suspend broadcasts of RT.

Guernsey – "Guernsey follows the UK's sanctions regime and UK foreign policy and will continue to do so. Some of the announced measures will apply automatically and this has already been communicated to the industry. Some of the other sanctions announced yesterday may require new legislation in the UK and if so, the States will move in step with the UK to ensure that all new sanctions will apply and be enforced uniformly."

Isle of Man – The Isle of Man closed its airspace and ports to Russian airplanes and ships, and extended the UK's sanctions to automatically apply on the Isle of Man. Chief minister Alfred Cannan condemned the invasion.

Jersey – Deputy (Acting) Chief Minister, Senator Lyndon Farnham, stated, "We are fully alongside the United Kingdom in its condemnation of this aggressive action, and we will act promptly in line with the UK's response. The UK is ultimately responsible for our foreign relations as a matter of international law, and we implement both U.K. and UN sanctions."

The government applied economic sanctions on Russian banks and individual citizens and banned Aeroflot planes from entering British airspace. In retaliation the Russian government banned British planes from entering Russian airspace.

Britain supplied Ukraine with military equipment; most notably NLAW missiles, commencing in January 2022 in anticipation of the invasion. As of 16 March, the UK confirmed that it had delivered more than 4,000 NLAWs. The UK commenced supplying Ukraine with Starstreak missiles (HVM). British soldiers were sent via Poland to help train Ukrainian forces. These were sent as an interim measure until the arrival of the Sky Sabre missile defence system.

On 26 February, Britain and its partners blocked Russian banks' access to the SWIFT international payment system, according to Johnson.

On 5 March, Britain warned that Russia's suggested ceasefire in Mariupol, Ukraine, was a ploy to distract international attention while reorganizing its forces. "By accusing Ukraine of breaking the agreement, Russia is likely seeking to shift responsibility for current and future civilian casualties in the city," stated the British defence ministry. Britain urged its citizens to consider leaving the country. "If your presence in Russia is not essential, we advise that you consider leaving by remaining commercial routes."

On 11 March the UK imposed sanctions on 386 members of Russia's lower house of parliament and attempted to prohibit the export of luxury products to Russia.

On 12 March, France, the United Kingdom, and Germany cautioned Russia that its demands for economic guarantees with Iran could jeopardize an almost-completed nuclear deal.

On 17 March, the United Kingdom said it had "very, very strong evidence" of war crimes in Ukraine, and that Russian President Vladimir Putin was orchestrating them.

The UK is on Russia's "Unfriendly Countries List" (red). Countries and territories on the list have imposed or joined sanctions against Russia.

On 24 March, the Kremlin declared Johnson to the most active anti-Russian leader. Downing Street rejected these claims and stated that the Prime Minister was "anti-Putin" and had no issue with the Russian people. On 3 May, Russia aired a segment titled The Sinkable Island. During the segment, hosted by Dmitry Kiselyov, a simulation showing a hypothetical nuclear attack on Great Britain was shown.

On 29 October, Russia accused the UK of involvement in the Nord Stream pipeline sabotage, which it claimed was carried out by the Royal Navy, in addition to involvement in the drone strikes on the Sevastopol Naval Base. The UK Ministry of Defence released a statement denouncing the claims and stated that Russia was "peddling lies on an epic scale". Earlier in the month, Russia had accused the UK of involvement in the Crimean Bridge explosion.

== North America ==
=== Positive relations ===
==== Cuba ====
The Cuban government blamed the Russo-Ukrainian war on the US and supported Russia's right to "self-defense," arguing for a diplomatic resolution.

==== Nicaragua ====
President Daniel Ortega defended Putin's invasion.

Russian state television reported in June 2022 that Ortega had extended an invitation to Russian forces to enter his country in the second half of 2022. State TV host Olga Skabeeva said "It's time for Russia to launch something potent closer to the American city on a hill."

=== Other relations ===
==== El Salvador ====
The Nayib Bukele administration on the Russia-Ukraine conflict remained neutral.

==== Honduras ====
Honduras initially condemned the invasion.

In December 2023, Honduras voted against condemning Russia at the United Nations.

=== Strained relations ===
==== Antigua and Barbuda ====
Antigua and Barbuda

Minister of Foreign Affairs Paul Chet Greene condemned the Russian invasion and urged talks.

==== Bahamas ====
The Bahamas

The Bahamas denounced the invasion. Foreign Minister Fred Mitchell stated "The invasion by the Russian Federation and led by its President Vladimir Putin is wrong, unlawful and should end and be reversed."

==== Barbados ====
Barbados

Prime Minister Mia Mottley urged Russia to withdraw and described the invasion as a violation of Ukrainian territorial integrity.

==== Belize ====
Belize

The Government of Belize condemned the 'illegal Russian invasion' and expressed its solidarity with Ukraine.

==== Canada ====
Canada imposed economic sanctions on Russia that prevented Canada from exporting services related to Russia's oil, gas, and chemical industries as of June 2022.

==== Costa Rica ====
President Carlos Alvarado released a statement condemning the "use of force and the violation of the sovereignty and territorial integrity of Ukraine", saying that peace is the "only way".

==== Dominica ====
Dominica condemned the invasion.

==== Dominican Republic ====
Dominican President Luis Abinader urged Russia to withdraw from Ukraine and stated that Russia was violating the political, cultural and territorial identity of Ukrainians.

==== United States ====
On 26 February, President Joe Biden gave the US State Department permission to send Ukraine up to $350 million worth of arms from US stockpiles.

== South America ==
=== Positive relations ===
==== Venezuela (Maduro government) ====
The country's government blamed NATO and the United States for the invasion, stating that they had violated the Minsk agreements. President Nicolás Maduro said before the invasion that Venezuela was with Putin, but also urged a diplomatic dialogue to avoid an increase in the conflict.

=== Other relations ===
==== Brazil ====
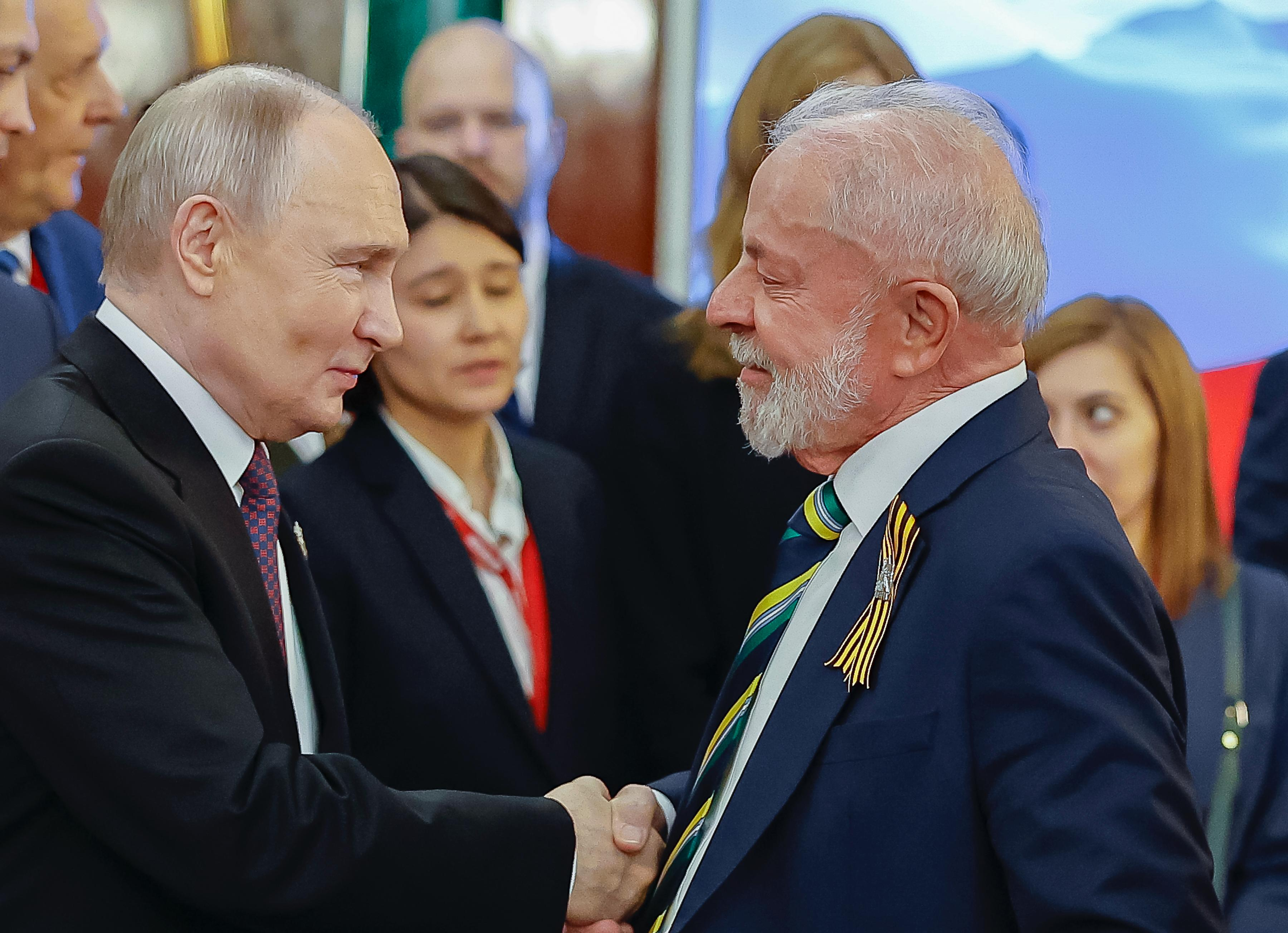
Brazilian President Lula da Silva with Vladimir Putin during the Victory Day celebrations in Moscow on 7 May 2025

President Jair Bolsonaro declined to condemn the invasion, while departing from his government's official stance to say that Brazil would remain neutral. Brazil supported a UNSC resolution condemning the invasion on 25 February. Vice-president Hamilton Mourão suggested use of force against Russia in the context of military crisis. However, on 27 February, Bolsonaro said that he would not condemn the invasion and that Brazil would remain neutral. In 2023, Brazilian President Luiz Inácio Lula da Silva condemned the invasion, but suggested Ukraine could "give up Crimea" in exchange for peace and Russia's withdrawal to the pre-invasion lines. In May 2025, Brazilian President Lula da Silva attended the Victory Day parade in Moscow.

==== Bolivia ====
The Ministry of Foreign Affairs stated that, as "a pacifist state", the Bolivian government urged Russia and Ukraine to avoid the use of force and seek diplomatic de-escalation. It did not explicitly condemn the invasion, instead citing a "lack of dialogue and understanding" as causing escalation. Two days later, on 28 February, before the UN General Assembly, Bolivia rejected Russia's "invasion and unilateral actions". Nonetheless, Bolivia abstained from UN and OAS motions condemning Russia or demanding a cessation of hostilities and voted against expelling Russia from the United Nations Human Rights Council.

=== Strained relations ===
==== Argentina ====
On 24 February, the Ministry of Foreign Affairs called on Russia to respect the UN charter and international law. President Alberto Fernández asked "the Russian Federation to put an end to the military action, respect Ukraine's sovereignty and return to dialogue." On 24 February, Argentina, along with Brazil and three other Latin American states, abstained from a vote at the Organization of American States condemning the invasion, saying the organization was not a "pertinent forum". On 2 March, Argentina voted in favor of the United Nations General Assembly Resolution ES-11/1 condemning Russia's invasion. Foreign Minister Santiago Cafiero called the invasion "illegitimate" and condemned "military operations on Ukrainian soil". Argentina supported Ukraine at the UN Human Rights Council. On 1 July 2022, Fernández had a phone conversation with President Zelenskyy, where Fernández condemned the invasion again and promised more aid to Ukraine.

==== Colombia ====
President Iván Duque stated that Colombia "categorically rejects the attacks against Ukraine by Russia".

==== Ecuador ====
President Guillermo Lasso said that Ecuador would support the position of the United Nations and the Organization of American States in condemning the invasion. "The aggression is a violent intrusion and a violation of our principles for worldwide peace," he said. He added, however, that Ecuador had no plans to suspend diplomatic relations with Russia.

==== Guyana ====
Guyana condemned the invasion and urged Russia to respect Ukrainian sovereignty.

==== Paraguay ====
Paraguay condemned the invasion.

==== Peru ====
Foreign Affairs Minister César Landa said: "Faced with the violation of [the] sovereignty, territory, and integrity of Ukraine, Peru rejects the use of force and states its opinion through the Foreign Affairs Ministry, invoking respect for international law."

==== Suriname ====
Suriname condemned the invasion.

==== Uruguay ====
President Luis Lacalle Pou condemned Russia's "actions contrary to international law". The Ministry of Foreign Relations stated that the attacks violated the principles of the Charter of the United Nations. It announced that four Uruguayan citizens were evacuated from Ukraine to Cyprus.

==== Venezuela ====
Venezuela (Guaido government)

Venezuelan interim President Juan Guaido condemned the invasion.

== Africa ==
=== Positive relations ===
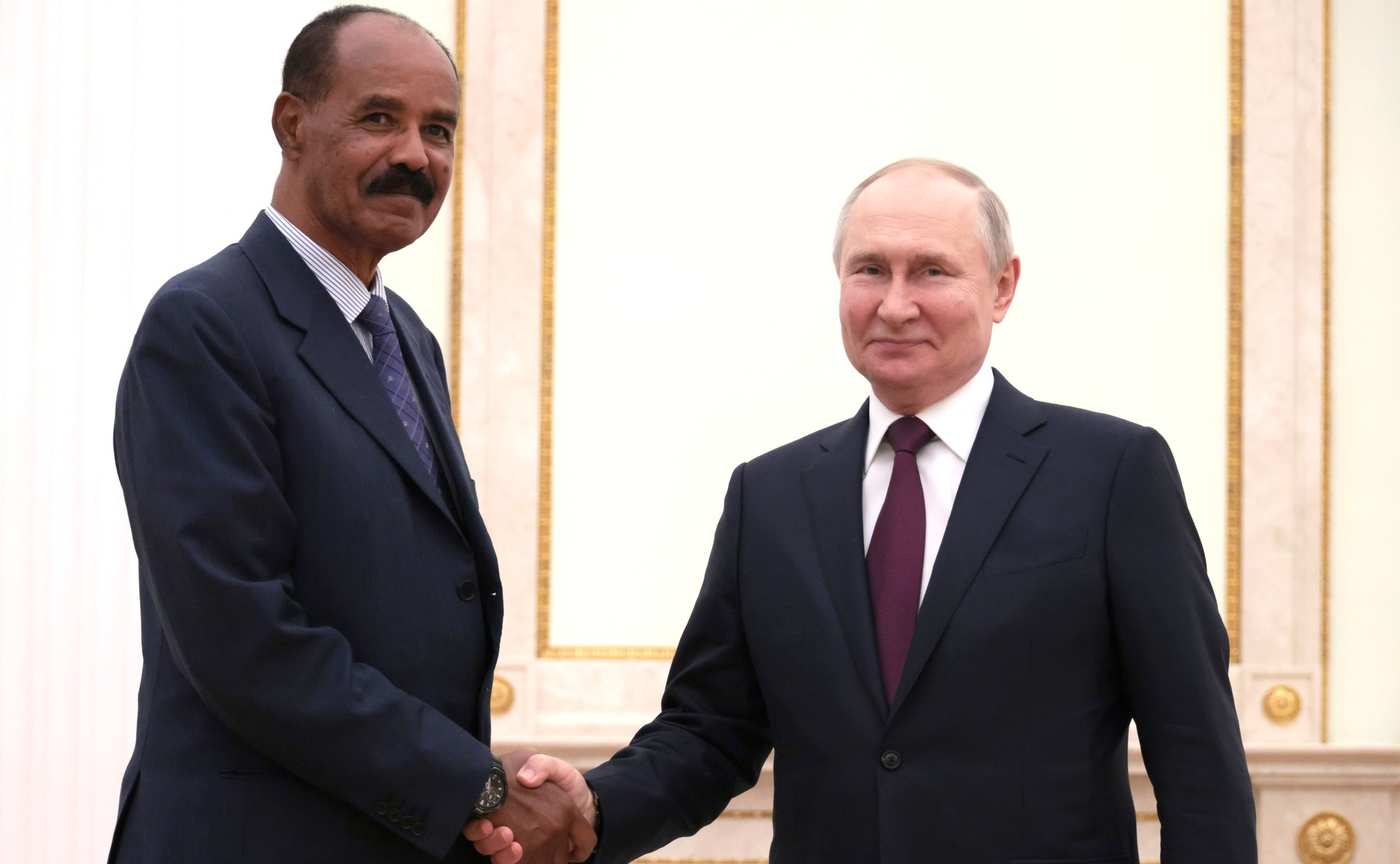
Eritrean President Isaias Afwerki with Russian President Putin at the Kremlin in Moscow on 31 May 2023

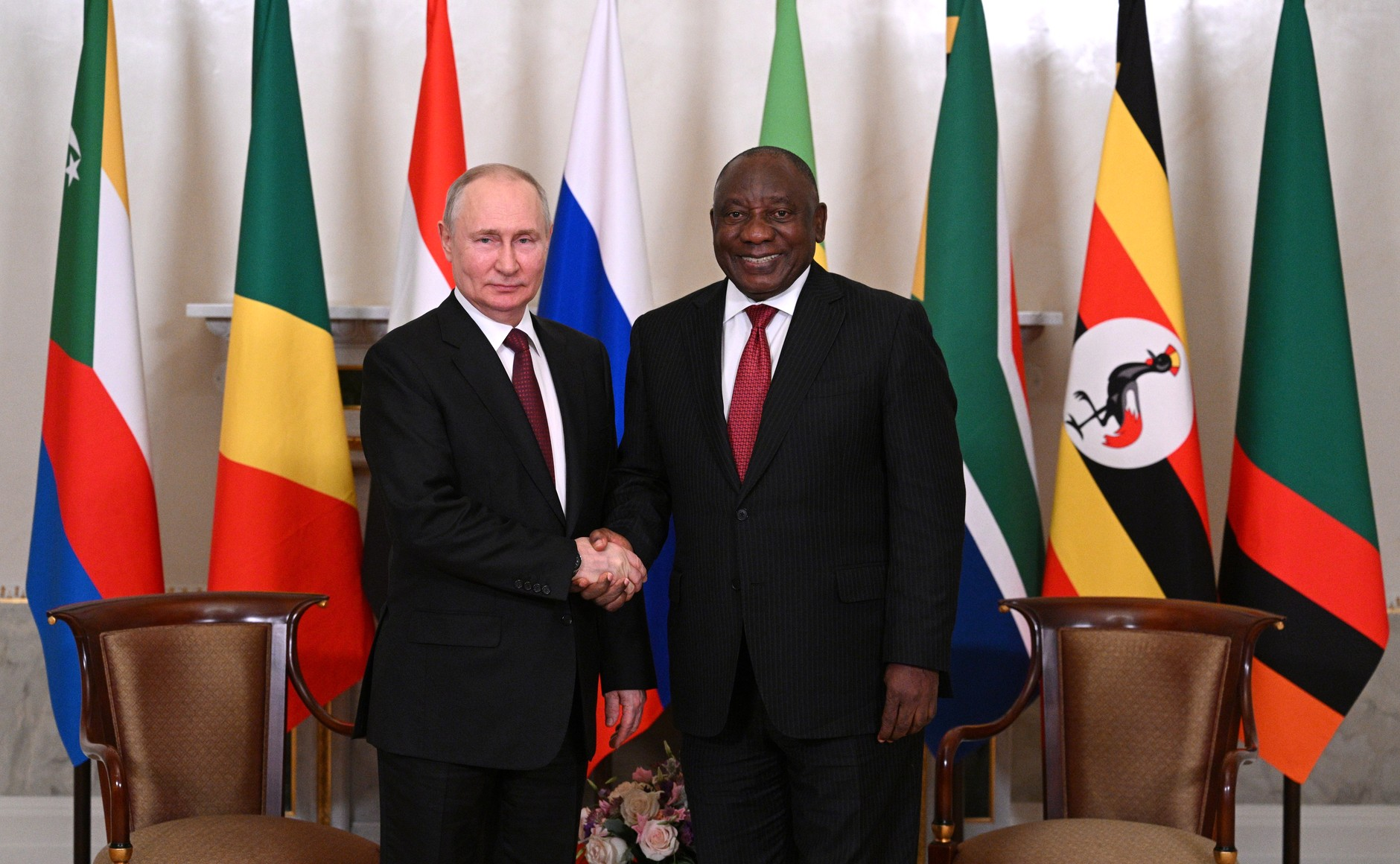
Putin with South African President Cyril Ramaphosa in St. Petersburg on 17 June 2023

==== Algeria ====
Algeria took a cautious stance, neither publicly endorsing or condemning the invasion. Comments focused on the situation of Algerians in Ukraine. Algeria rejected the Sonatrach CEO's assertion (later repudiated) that Algeria was ready to increase gas supply to Europe. Algeria disagreed with Ukraine's plan to hire mercenaries.

Algeria wanted to join BRICS with Russian support (later abandoning the effort). Algeria's relations with Russia remained positive.

==== Burkina Faso ====
President Ibrahim Traoré stated "There is a desire to change politics which leads us to turn our backs on our traditional partners and turn towards our true friends like Russia."

Burkina Faso is one of six African countries in the Russia-Africa grain deal in which members receive up to 50,000 tonnes of grain each free of charge.

==== Burundi ====
In 2023, Burundi and Russia signed an agreement on nuclear cooperation.

In 2024, Russian President Vladimir Putin is expected to visit Burundi.

Burundi's foreign minister insisted that his country would not take sides in Russia's war against Ukraine. However, in December 2023, Burundi voted against condemning Russia at the United Nations.

=== Other relations ===
==== Angola ====
Angola

The Angolan government urged a ceasefire and warned that the conflict, in addition to causing human and material damage, caused "a climate of tension between the two countries, with international proportions". The Angolan Ministry of Foreign Affairs said that "the parties must strive for the peaceful resolution of the conflict."

==== Somalia ====
Somalia

Somalia is one of six African countries to be part of the Russia-Africa grain deal in which the African countries that are members of the organization receive up to 50,000 tonnes of grain each free of charge.

However, Somalia condemned the invasion.

=== Strained relations ===
==== Kenya ====
Kenya

William Ruto, president of Kenya, refused to attend the 2023 Russia–Africa Summit and opted for the African Union (AU) to represent Kenya instead. A spokesperson asked the AU "to try and tie down relations with Africa as it gets shunned by the West over its war in Ukraine".

Kenya took part in the joint statement led by Albanian-Americans after the UN Security Council voted on a resolution concerning Russian aggression against Ukraine.

==== Liberia ====
Liberia

The Liberian government condemned the unprovoked attack and "[urged] Russia to ease hostilities".

== Asia ==
=== Positive relations ===
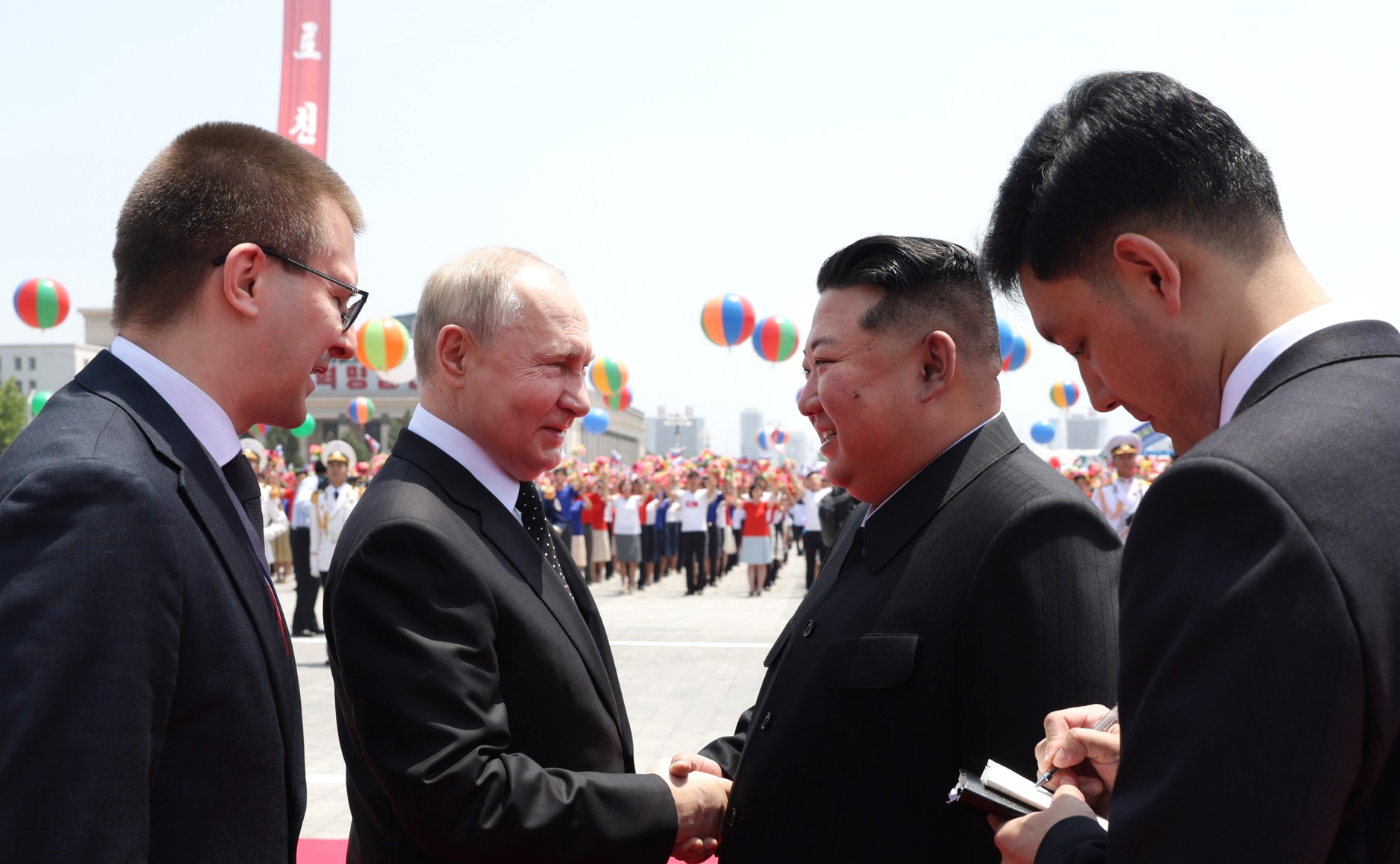
Putin and North Korean leader Kim Jong Un in Pyongyang, North Korea, 19 June 2024

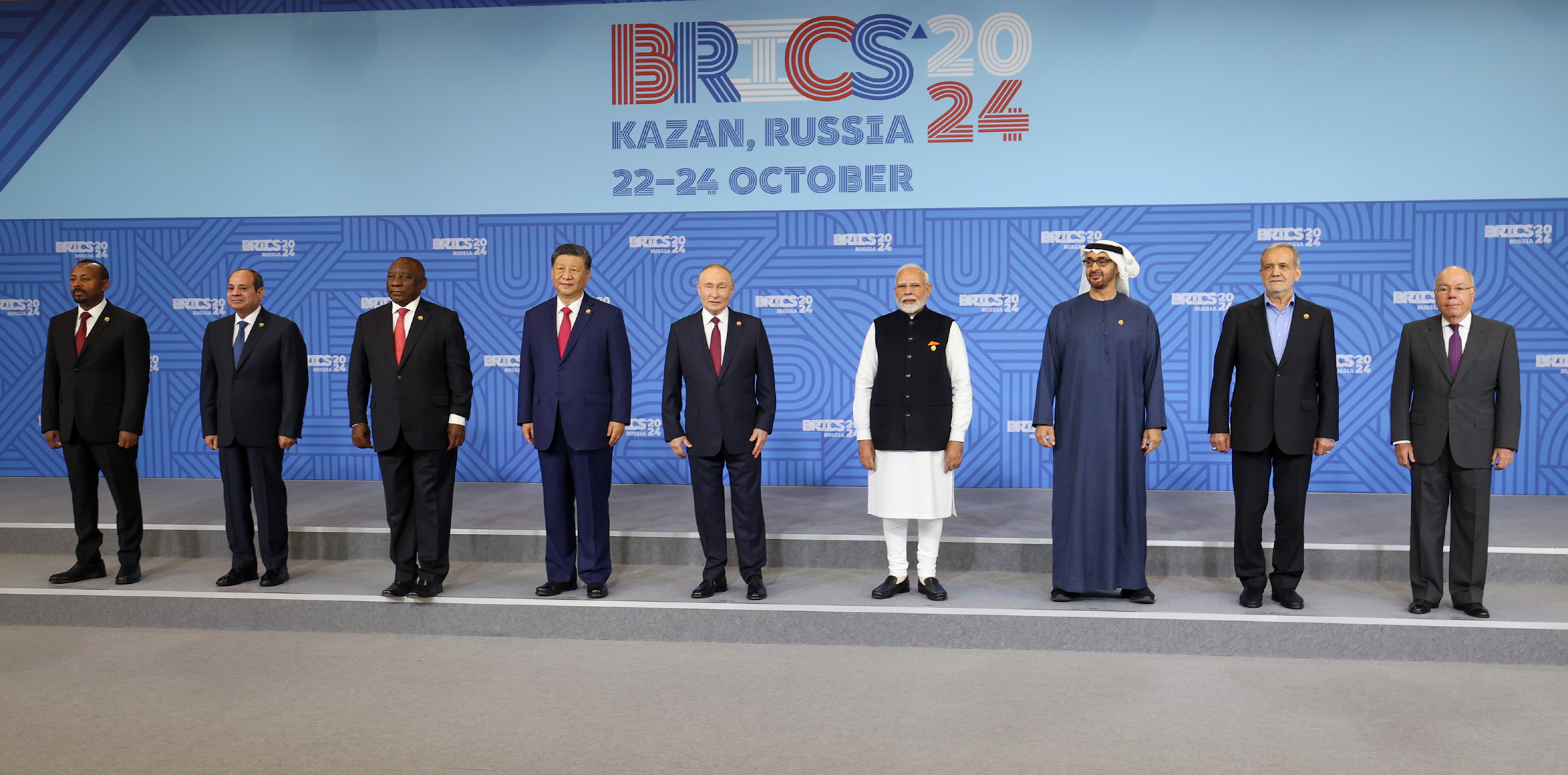
Putin with Chinese leader Xi Jinping, Indian Prime Minister Narendra Modi and other leaders at the 16th BRICS summit in Kazan, Russia, 23 October 2024

==== Afghanistan (Islamic Emirate) (Note: Taliban-controlled state) ====
On 25 February the Taliban called for "resolving the crisis through dialogue and peaceful means".

In September, the Taliban signed a provisional deal with Russia for oil, gas, and wheat.

==== China ====
On 20–22 March 2023, Xi Jinping, general secretary of the Chinese Communist Party and Chinese president, visited Russia, in his first international meeting since his re-election as president during the 2023 National People's Congress.

From 5 to 10 May 2025, Xi Jinping, the general secretary of the Chinese Communist Party and the president of China, paid a state visit to Russia and attended the 2025 Victory Day Parade in Moscow. Xi Jinping was accompanied by CCP General Office director Cai Qi and foreign minister Wang Yi. This is the second time Xi Jinping attended the Moscow Victory Day Parade on May 9 since 2015.

=== Other relations ===
==== Mongolia ====
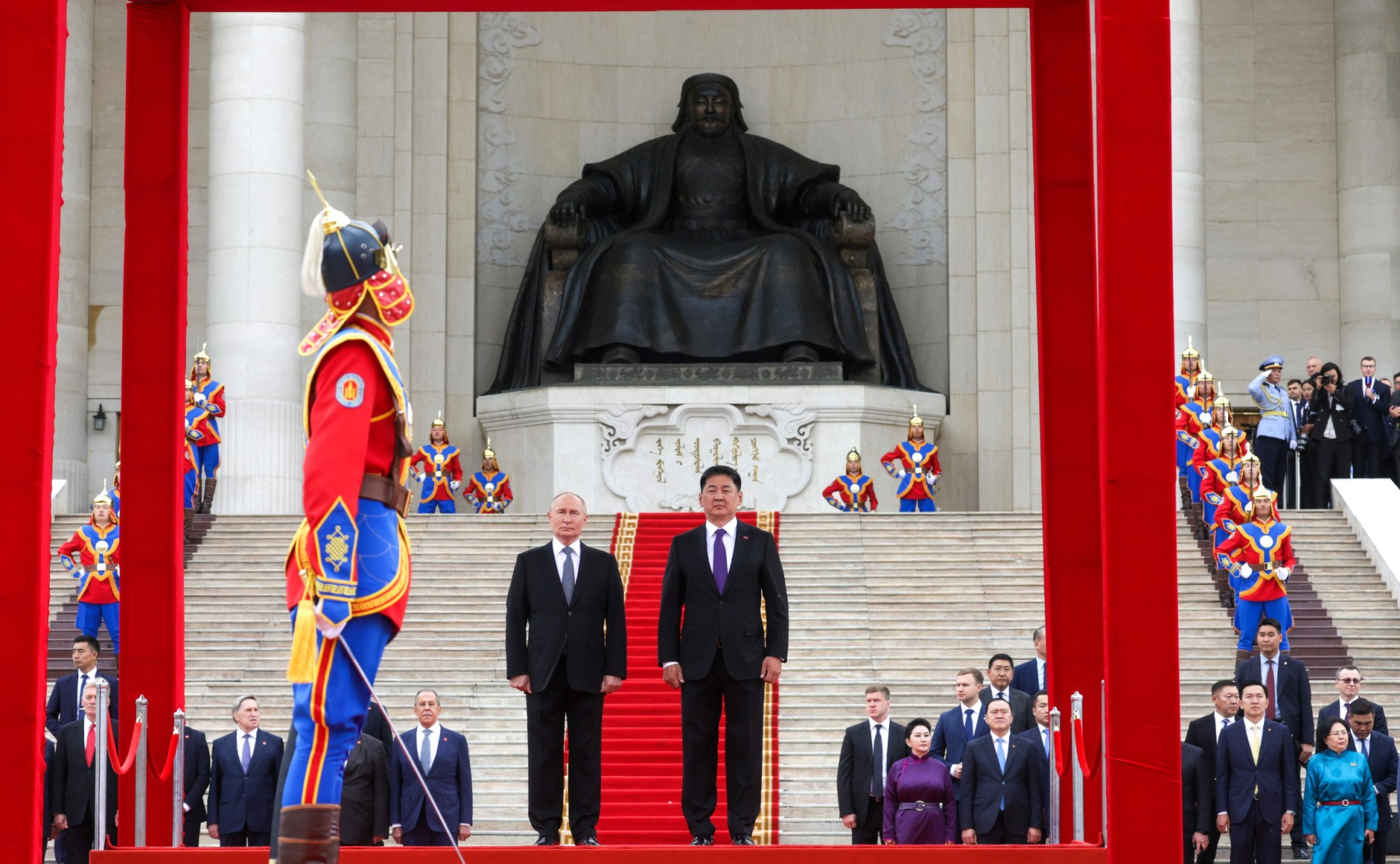
Vladimir Putin and Mongolian President Ukhnaagiin Khürelsükh standing in front of the statue of Genghis Khan in Ulaanbaatar, Mongolia, 3 September 2024

Battsetseg Batmunkh, Mongolia's foreign minister, said "if the situation continued to escalate it may contribute negatively to world peace and stability", and called on the parties to quickly negotiate a ceasefire.

=== Strained relations ===
==== Afghanistan (Islamic Republic of Afghanistan) (Note: Internationally recognized state) ====
The United Nations envoy of the deposed Islamic Republic of Afghanistan condemned the invasion.

==== Kazakhstan ====
Kazakhstan, a neighbour and ally of Russia, reportedly denied a request for its troops to join the invasion. A statement issued on its Telegram channel on 27 February said: "A request to send Kazakh military to Ukraine or any other country hasn't been received and, correspondingly, hasn't been considered." Kazakhstan avoided criticising Russia's invasion. President Kassym-Jomart Tokayev stated that his country would not recognize Luhansk and Donetsk Republics, which he considered to be quasi-states.

Kazakhstan–Russia relations deteriorated following the invasion. Foreign Minister Mukhtar Tleuberdi did not condemn the Russian invasion and abstained on the UN vote to condemn it.

In addition to sending humanitarian aid to Ukraine, the Kazakh military increased spending and training. Northern Kazakhstan's sizeable Russian minority, led to concerns that Russia might use the same arguments as in Ukraine to bolster irredentism there.

Kazakhstan received a large influx of Russians leaving to avoid conscription. President Tokayev promised that his government would help Russians who were leaving "because of the current hopeless situation", and that it was "a political and a humanitarian issue."

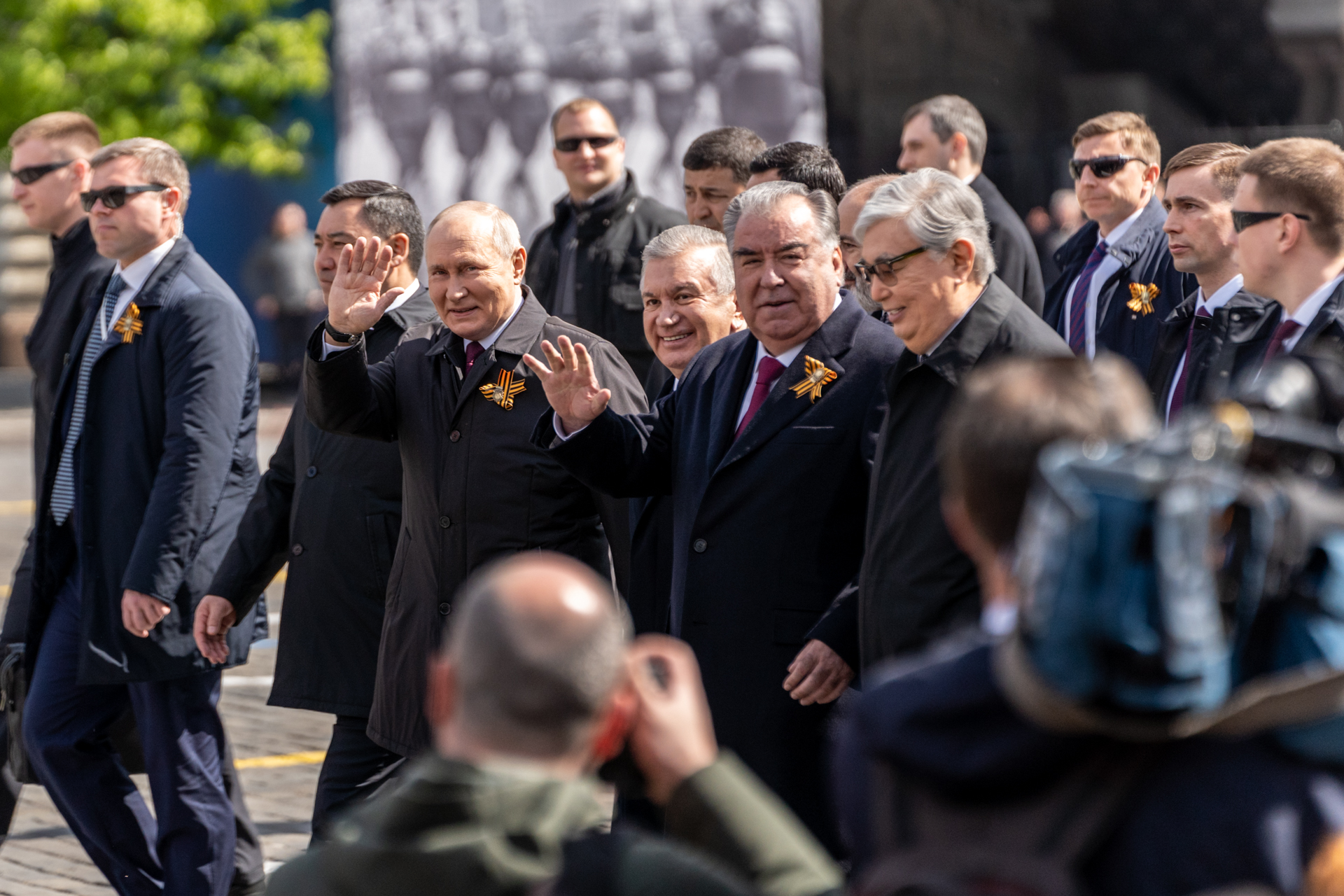
Putin, Tokayev and other post-Soviet leaders from Central Asia at the 2023 Moscow Victory Day Parade

Kazakhstan agreed to share the personal data of exiled anti-war Russians with the Russian government. In September, Kazakh authorities detained a Russian journalist who was wanted on charges of "discrediting" the Russian military. In December, Kazakhstan deported a Russian citizen who fled mobilization. In January 2023, Kazakhstan announced they were tightening visa rules.

Russia suspended shipments of Kazakh oil after Tokayev’s statements at the St. Petersburg International Economic Forum, where he stated that Kazakhstan would not recognize the DPR and LPR "republics". However, Kazakh/Russian relations remained mostly friendly, as shown by Tokayev's visit to Moscow in November 2022.

In September 2023, Tokayev stated that Kazakhstan would follow the sanctions regime against Russia.

In January 2024, the head of the Kazakh diaspora in Moscow, Polat Dzhamalov, was charged by Russian authorities with spreading "false information" about the Russian armed forces after he shared a senior Russian official's alleged estimate of Russian military deaths in a Facebook post.

== Reactions to the invasion ==
International reactions to the invasion Countries that have condemned the invasion Countries that have maintained a neutral stance Countries that have supported the invasion or blamed the invasion on Ukraine and/or NATO provocation Unknown Russia Ukraine

=== Countries that support Ukraine ===
1. Afghanistan
2. Albania
3. Andorra
4. Antigua and Barbuda
5. Argentina
6. Australia
7. Austria
8. Bahamas
9. Barbados
10. Belgium
11. Belize
12. Bhutan
13. Botswana
14. Brunei
15. Bulgaria
16. Cambodia
17. Canada
18. Cape Verde
19. Chad
20. Chile
21. Costa Rica
22. Croatia
23. Cyprus
24. Czech Republic
25. DRC
26. Denmark
27. Dominica
28. Dominican Republic
29. East Timor
30. Ecuador
31. Estonia
32. Fiji
33. Finland
34. France
35. Gambia
36. Georgia
37. Germany
38. Ghana
39. Greece
40. Grenada
41. Guatemala
42. Guyana
43. Haiti
44. Iceland
45. Indonesia
46. Ireland
47. Italy
48. Ivory Coast
49. Jamaica
50. Japan
51. Kenya
52. Kiribati
53. Kuwait
54. Latvia
55. Lebanon
56. Lesotho
57. Libya
58. Liechtenstein
59. Liberia
60. Lithuania
61. Luxembourg
62. Malawi
63. Malaysia
64. Maldives
65. Malta
66. Marshall Islands
67. Mauritius
68. Micronesia
69. Moldova
70. Monaco
71. Montenegro
72. Nepal
73. Netherlands
74. New Zealand
75. Nigeria
76. North Macedonia
77. Norway
78. Palau
79. Panama
80. Papua New Guinea
81. Paraguay
82. Peru
83. Philippines
84. Poland
85. Portugal
86. Qatar
87. Romania
88. Rwanda
89. Saint Lucia
90. San Marino
91. Samoa
92. Sierra Leone
93. Singapore
94. Slovakia
95. Slovenia
96. South Korea
97. Spain
98. Suriname
99. Sweden
100. Switzerland
101. Thailand
102. Trinidad and Tobago
103. Tunisia
104. United Kingdom
105. United States
106. Uruguay

==== Non-UN states ====
1. Kosovo
2. Taiwan

=== Countries that have maintained a neutral stance ===
1. Afghanistan
2. Angola
3. Armenia
4. Azerbaijan
5. Brazil
6. Bosnia and Herzegovina
7. El Salvador
8. Honduras
9. India
10. Iraq
11. Kazakhstan
12. Mexico
13. Mongolia
14. Namibia
15. Pakistan
16. South Africa
17. Turkey
18. Vietnam
19. Zambia

==== Non-UN states ====
1. Sovereign Military Order of Malta
2. Vatican City

=== Neutral-Friendly countries to Russia ===
1. Algeria
2. Bolivia
3. China
4. Egypt
5. Ethiopia
6. Guinea
7. Hungary
8. Kyrgyzstan
9. Laos
10. Morocco
11. Saudi Arabia
12. Serbia
13. Sri Lanka
14. Tajikistan
15. Uganda
16. United Arab Emirates
17. Uzbekistan

=== Countries that support Russia ===
1. Belarus
2. Burkina Faso
3. Burundi
4. Central African Republic
5. Cuba
6. Eritrea
7. Iran
8. Mali
9. Myanmar
10. Nicaragua
11. Niger
12. North Korea
13. Sudan
14. Syria (Until 2024)
15. Venezuela
16. Zimbabwe

==== Non-UN states ====
1. Abkhazia
2. Artsakh (until 2023)
3. South Ossetia
4. Transnistria
