= Ministry of Education, Youth and Sports =

The Ministry of Education, Youth and Sports may refer to:

- Ministry of Education, Youth and Sports (Cambodia)
- Ministry of Education, Youth and Sports (Czech Republic)

== See also ==
- Ministry of Education, Sports and Youth, Albania
