= Ogerta Manastirliu =

Albanian politician (born 1978)

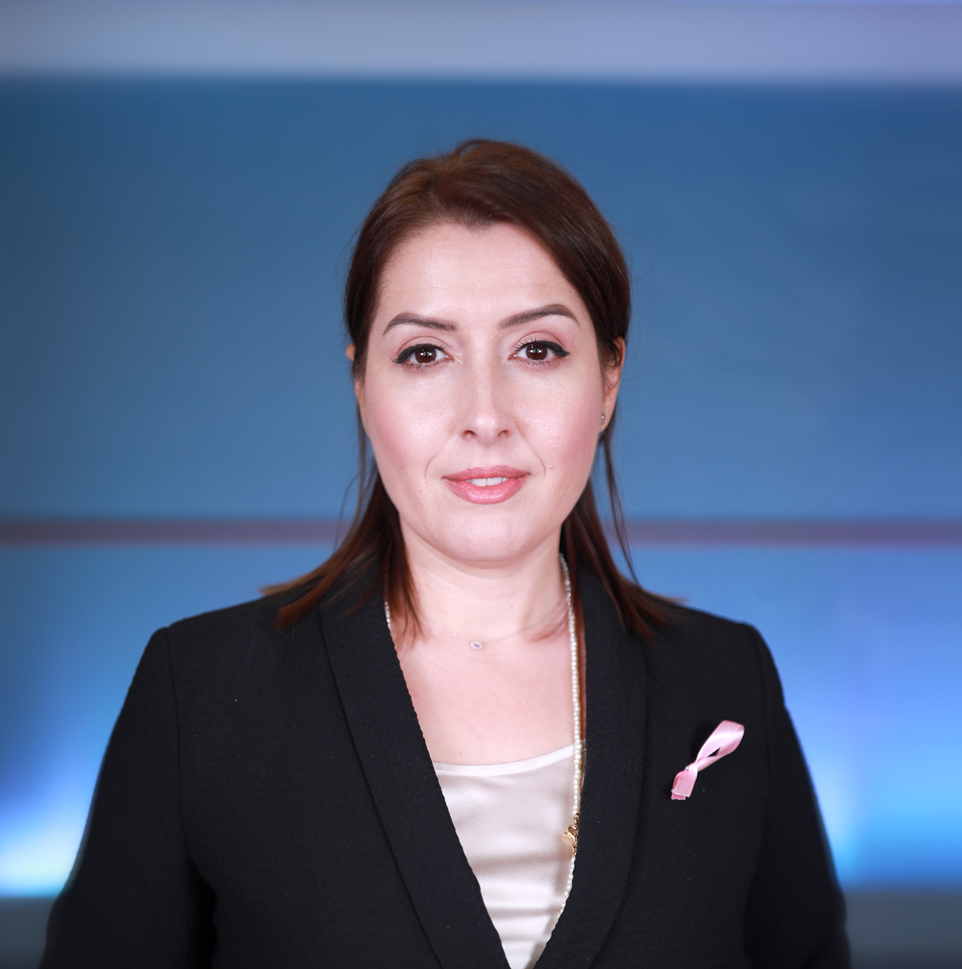

Minister of Education and Sports
- In office 11 September 2023 – 19 September 2025
- President: Bajram Begaj
- Prime Minister: Edi Rama
- Preceded by: Evis Kushi
- Succeeded by: Mirela Kumbaro

Member of the Albanian Parliament for Tirana
- Incumbent
- Assumed office 25 June 2017

Minister of Health and Social Care
- In office 13 September 2017 – 11 September 2023
- Prime Minister: Edi Rama
- Preceded by: Arben Beqiri
- Succeeded by: Albana Koçiu

Personal details
- Born: December 31, 1978 (age 47) Tirana, PSR Albania
- Party: Socialist
- Education: University of Tirana

Ogerta Manastirliu (born December 31, 1978) is an Albanian politician who served as the Minister of Education and Sport of Albania from 11 September 2023 until 19 September 2025. She has also been a Member of Parliament (MP) for Tirana. On 13 March 2017, she was appointed as Minister of Health. She held the office until September 2023, due to the general election.

Manastirliu was first elected as a member of parliament in the 2017 general election in the constituency of Tirana.

On 10 September 2017 she was reappointed to hold the portfolio of Ministry of Health and Social Protection in the Rama II Government.

== Early life and career ==
Ogerta Manastirliu was born in Tirana on December 31, 1978.

Manastirliu holds the title "Doctor of Science" in "Analytical Chemistry and Environment". Earlier she studied at the University of Tirana, at the Faculty of Natural Sciences, the General Chemistry branch, where she graduated and received the title "Master in Science" in the same branch. Since 2009 she has been engaged as an examiner at the Faculty of Natural Sciences.

In 2004 she started her professional career in the Municipality of Tirana, initially in the Project Coordination Directorate. From 2005 to 2011, she headed the Housing and Social Services Directorate. In this assignment, Manasterliu was one of the main contributors to the design and implementation of the "Local Housing Strategy".

From 2011 to 2013, she was engaged as an expert in managing and coordinating social and human resources policies for national and international organizations, such as UNFPA and Friedrich Ebert Stiftung.

She has a long activation in the ranks of the Socialist Party and is a member of the Parliament of Albania. In the parliamentary elections of 2017, she was first elected as deputy of the Albanian Parliament.

Manastirliu is fluent in English and Italian.

== Plagiarism scandal ==
In October 2018, many public figures and politicians in Albania were involved in a plagiarism scandal involving their master's and Ph.D. theses. The denouncement of cases of plagiarism was started by Taulant Muka, a young epidemiologist educated in the Netherlands, who waged a crusade against the “fake” PhDs held by many politicians and government functionaries. This scandal, among other things, sparked nationwide protests from the students of public universities, requiring a vetting for all academic titles held by public figures, state officials and politicians.

Manastirliu was accused of having plagiarised her thesis. She rejected the accusations, stressing the authenticity of the doctorate work. She was supported by the university professor who had led the doctorate work.

== Personal life ==
She is married to Ermal Gjinaj; the couple has two daughters.

== See also ==
- Council of Ministers
- Socialist Party
- Ministry of Health and Social Care
