= Minister of State for Diaspora (Albania) =

Former government ministry of Albania

- Ministër i Shtetit për Diasporën

Ministerial post overview
- Formed: 13 September 2017
- Dissolved: 18 September 2021
- Jurisdiction: Council of Ministers
- Status: Dissolved
- Headquarters: Tirana, Albania
- Minister responsible: Pandeli Majko (PS), Minister of State for Diaspora
- Website: diaspora.gov.al

The Minister of State for Diaspora (Albanian: Minister i Shtetit për Diasporën) was a ministerial post of the Albanian Government responsible for communicating and dealing with issues that affected the Albanian diaspora. Its minister was Pandeli Majko.

== Subordinate institutions ==
- Coordinative Council of Diaspora
- National Diaspora Agency
- Diaspora Publication Center
- Diaspora Development Fund
- Albanian Diaspora Business Chamber

== Officeholders ==
1. Pandeli Majko (13 September 2017 – 18 September 2021)

== See also ==
- Albanian diaspora
- Albanian Diaspora Summit
