= Evis Kushi =

Albanian politician (born 1975)

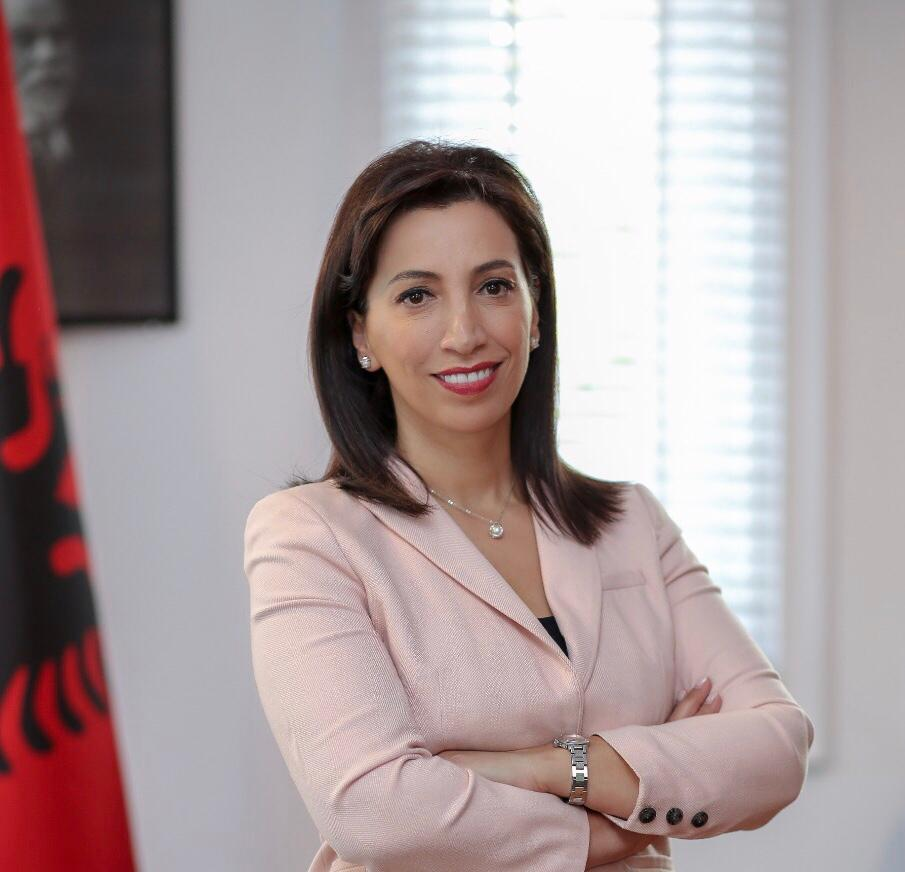
- Image of Evis Kushi

52nd Minister of Education, Youth and Sports
- In office 14 September 2020 – 11 September 2023
- President: Ilir Meta; Bajram Begaj
- Prime Minister: Edi Rama
- Preceded by: Besa Shahini
- Succeeded by: Ogerta Manastirliu

Personal details
- Born: 7 October 1975 (age 50) Elbasan, Albania
- Party: Socialist Party
- Education: Universiteti "Aleksandër Xhuvani"
- Alma mater: Faculty of Economics
- Occupation: Politician
- Cabinet: Rama Cabinet (II, III)
- Website: www.parlament.al

Evis Kushi (born 7 October 1975) is an Albanian politician. She served as 52nd Minister of Education, Sports and Youth from September 2020 until September 2023.

== Early life ==
Evis Kushi was born on 7 October 1975 in Elbasan, Albania. She started her career in 1998 at the University "Aleksander Xhuvani" Elbasan about Basics of Marketing and Econometrics (1998-2012). Between 2010 and 2012, Kushi held the position of Head of the Department "Economy and Law", Faculty of Economics, "Aleksander Xhuvani" University, Elbasan. In 2012-2013 she served as Dean of the Faculty of Economics at the university.

== Political career ==
From 2013 onwards, Kushi is a member of the Elbasan Region in the Albanian Parliament, and has been part of Committee on Economy and Finance. In terms of social and political activities, Evis Kushi has been a member of the Socialist Party since March 2013 and a member of the Presidency of Socialist Party since April 2016. She is fluent in English, Italian and French. Following the departure of former Minister of Education Besa Shahini, Evis was appointed as the new Minister and has held this post since Rama II Cabinet on 14 September 2020 until now.

== Personal life ==
She is married and has two daughters, Ana and Luna.
