= Riol Chemie GmbH =

Riol Chemie GmbH is a German distributor of chemicals, reagents, deactivation agents and others, situated in Lilienthal (Osterholz), Lower Saxony.

They delivered chemicals and laboratory equipment to Chimmed Group. Customs officials conducted a search at their headquarters on September 30, 2022. A similar search has been made in Southern Germany, e.g. in Konstanz.
