= Besa Shahini =

Albanian politician

51st Minister of Education, Sports and Youth
- In office 17 January 2019 – 14 September 2020
- President: Ilir Meta
- Prime Minister: Edi Rama
- Preceded by: Mirela Karabina; Lindita Nikolla (Acting)
- Succeeded by: Evis Kushi

Personal details
- Born: 1982 (age 43–44) Pristina, SFR Yugoslavia (today Kosovo)
- Party: Socialist Party (Albania); Social Democratic Party (Kosovo)
- Spouse: Dardan Molliqaj (m. 2019)
- Education: Pearson College UWC; York University

Besa Shahini (born 1982) is a Kosovo-born Albanian politician, who served as the Minister of Education, Sports and Youth in the second cabinet of Edi Rama.

In the decade and a half prior to joining the Albanian government, she focused her research and advocacy on education and EU integration issues in the Western Balkans and South Caucasus. Besa Shahini holds a Master of Public Policy from the Hertie School in Berlin.

== Education ==
In 1999, her family moved to Canada. During her first two years there, she considered becoming an artist, but went to York University and studied political science and public administration. When she returned to Kosovo after her studies, she founded the Kosovar Stability Initiative think tank there.

In 2009, she completed a Master's degree in Public Policy at the Hertie School in Berlin.

== Albanian Minister of Education ==
At the end of 2018, there were major student protests in Albania, in the course of which Prime Minister Edi Rama partially reshuffled his government cabinet. He proposed to the Parliament of Albania (Kuvendi i Shqipërisë) the then Deputy Minister of Education Besa Shahini as the successor to Lindita Nikolla (PS – Socialist Party of Albania). She was elected with 77 out of 140 votes.

She was the first Kosovo Albanian to hold this post.

== Academic and civil society work ==
She is the founder of the Education Plenum Think Tank in Pristina (2014), focusing on research and educational analyses on schools and high schools in Kosovo. From 2016, she focused increasingly on education policy and the education system in Kosovo and Albania.

At the same time she was an independent policy analyst at the European Stability Initiative (ESI) in Berlin.

In September 2023, Besa Shahini officially took over the Henrik Enderlein fellowship from Dr Johannes Lindner, who continues his work as Co-Director of the Jacques Delors Centre, the Hertie School's research and policy centre working on the European Union.
