= Pandeli Majko =

Albanian politician (born 1967)

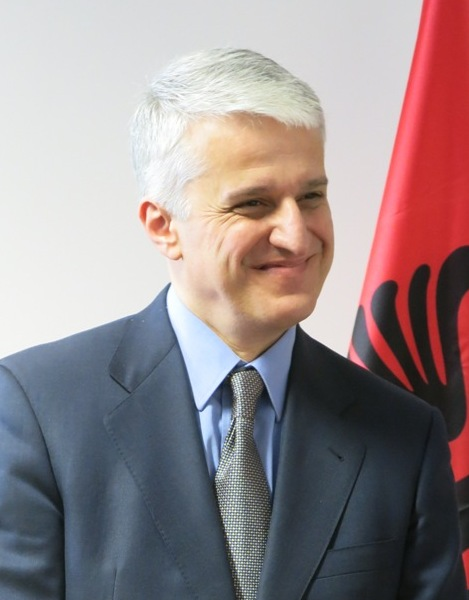
- Majko in 2013

30th Prime Minister of Albania
- In office 22 February 2002 – 25 July 2002
- President: Rexhep Meidani
- Preceded by: Ilir Meta
- Succeeded by: Fatos Nano
- In office 2 October 1998 – 29 October 1999
- President: Rexhep Meidani
- Preceded by: Fatos Nano
- Succeeded by: Ilir Meta

1st Minister of State for Diaspora
- In office 13 September 2017 – 18 September 2021
- Prime Minister: Edi Rama
- Preceded by: Office established
- Succeeded by: Office abolished

Member of the Albanian Parliament
- In office 6 April 1992 – 8 July 2025

Personal details
- Born: Pandeli Sotir Majko; 15 November 1967 (age 58) Tirana, PR Albania
- Party: Socialist Party
- Spouse: Enkelejda Majko
- Children: 2
- Education: University of Tirana

Pandeli Sotir Majko (born 15 November 1967) is an Albanian socialist politician. He served twice as Prime Minister of Albania; once from 1998 to 1999, and again in 2002.

== Political career ==
=== Early career ===
Majko has been a member of the "Euro-Socialist Youth Forum of Albania" (FRESH) since its foundation in 1992. FRESH is a member of the International Union of Socialist Youth. From 1992 to 1995, Majko served as president of FRESH. In 1992 he entered the Albanian Parliament as MP for the Socialist Party. In 1997–2001 he took part in the parliamentary committee charged with the task of drafting the new Constitution of Albania.He also held the post of Minister of Defense when the Socialist Party was in power. In 1997–1998 Majko was secretary general of the Socialist Party and head of its parliamentary group.

=== Prime minister ===
==== First term (1998–1999) ====
From September 1998 to October 1999 Majko held his first government as prime minister of Albania. He was the youngest Prime Minister of Albania, appointed when he was 30 years old in 1998 for the first time.

==== Second term (2002) ====
After the government of Ilir Meta, he briefly came back to premiership from February to July 2002. He subsequently held the post of Minister of Defence from July 2002 to September 2005 in the government of Fatos Nano. Following the government's defeat in the 2005 elections, he returned to his former position as secretary general of the Socialist Party.

=== Later career ===
In 2006, Majko came out in support of Montenegro's vote for independence from Serbia. He was quoted celebrating the reduction in Albania's shared border with Serbia.

He is a member of the General Council of the Transnational Radical Party.

He didn't manage to get elected in 2025 elections after serving for 33 years as a deputy in the parliament.

== Personal life ==
Majko was born in Tirana, to a family originally from Gjirokastra. In March 2013, after voting in favor of changing the name of the Liqenas to "Pustec" through a Facebook status, he denied having Slavic roots and introduced the beginning of his family, which started with a German doctor who moved from Parga to Gjirokastra due to the occupation of Parga by Ali Pasha of Ioannina, where he later married a local woman and was nicknamed "Memeci" due to the lack of fluent communication in the Albanian language, a nickname that would later become a surname. But later, this surname was changed to Majko by Pandeli's great-grandfather due to the trade relations that the family had at that time.

In April 2016, at his request, Pandeli Maiko was granted Kosovar citizenship through the mediation of former Kosovo President Atifete Jahjaga.

== See also ==
- List of Albanians
- Politics of Albania

Political offices
Preceded by Fatos Nano	Prime Minister of Albania; 1998–1999	Succeeded by Ilir Meta
Preceded by Ilir Meta	Prime Minister of Albania; 2002	Succeeded by Fatos Nano
