= Ministry of Education in Albania =

Government ministry of Albania

Ministry of Education
- Ministria e Arsimit

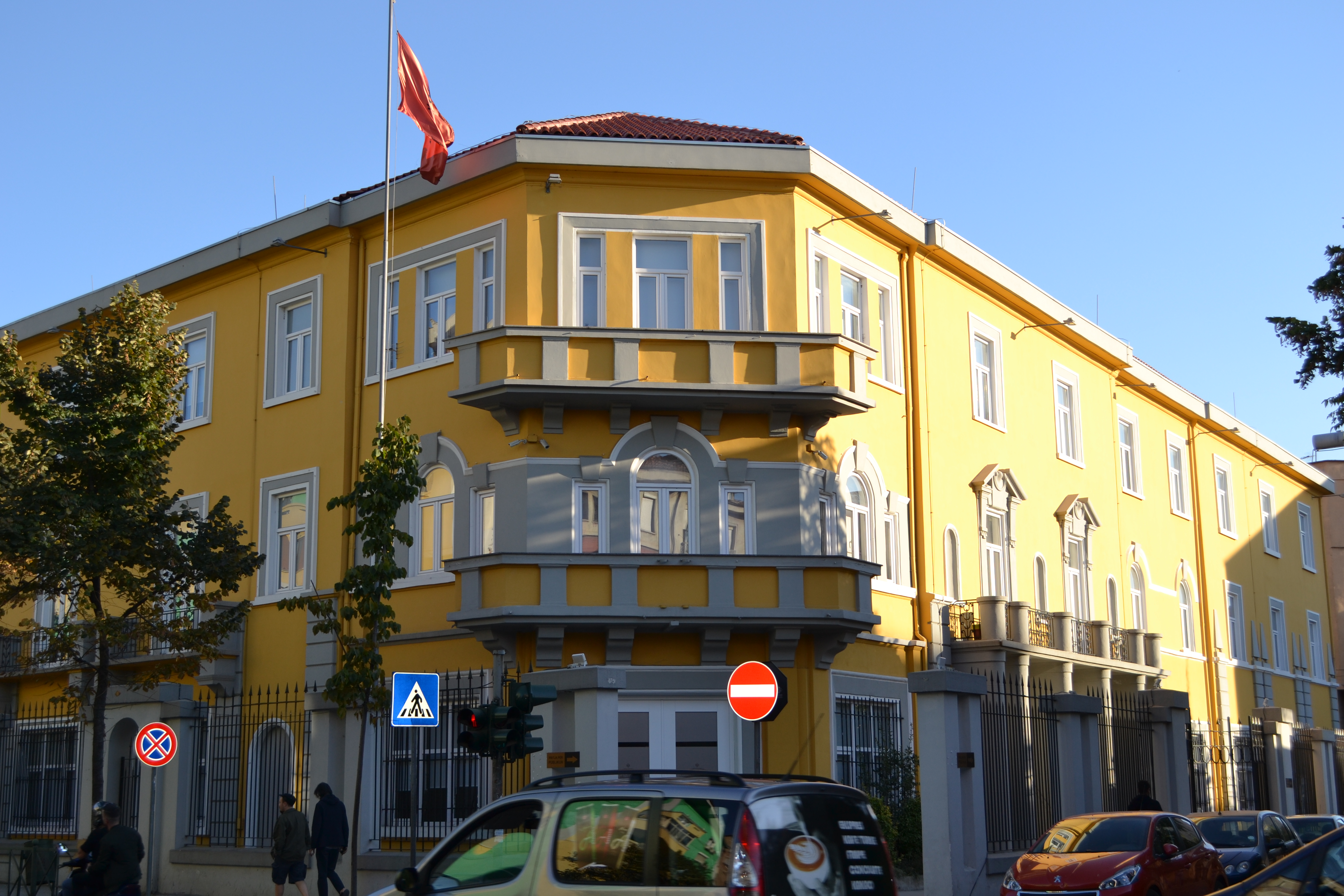

Department overview
- Formed: 4 December 1912; 113 years ago
- Jurisdiction: Albania
- Headquarters: Tirana
- Minister responsible: Mirela Kumbaro
- Website: arsimi.gov.al

The Ministry of Education (Albanian: Ministria e Arsimit) is a department of the Albanian Government responsible for Education. The current minister is Mirela Kumbaro.

== History ==
Since the establishment of the institution, the Ministry of Education has been reorganized by joining other departments or merging with other ministries, thus making its name change several times. This list reflects the changes made in years in pluralist history since 1992 as an institution:

- Ministry of Education (Ministria e Arsimit) from 1992 to 1996
- Ministry of Education and Sports (Ministria e Arsimit dhe Sportit) from 1996 to 1997
- Ministry of Education and Science (Ministria e Arsimit dhe Shkencës) from 1997 to 1998
- Ministry of Education (Ministria e Arsimit) from 1998 to 2001
- Ministry of Education and Science (Ministria e Arsimit dhe Shkencës) from 2001 to 2002
- Ministry of Education (Ministria e Arsimit) from 2002 to 2005
- Ministry of Education and Science (Ministria e Arsimit dhe Shkencës) from 2005 to 2013
- Ministry of Education and Sports (Ministria e Arsimit dhe Sportit) from 2013 to 2017
- Ministry of Education, Sports and Youth (Ministria e Arsimit, Sportit dhe Rinisë) from 2017 to 2021
- Ministry of Education and Sports (Ministria e Arsimit dhe Sportit) from 2021 - 2025
- Ministry of Education (Ministria e Arsimit) from 2025-now

== Subordinate institutions ==
- General Directorate of Pre-University Education
- Regional Education Directorates
- Sports Service Agency
- Educational Services Center
- Quality Assurance Agency of Higher Education
- Agency for Quality Assurance in Pre-University Education
- National Agency of Scientific Research and Innovation
- National Youth Agency

== Officeholders (1912–present) ==
No.	Name	Term in office
1	Luigj Gurakuqi	4 December 1912	22 January 1914
2	Mihal Turtulli	14 March 1914	3 September 1914
–	Luigj Gurakuqi	25 December 1918	29 January 1920
3	Sotir Peci	30 January 1920	14 November 1920
4	Kristo Floqi	15 November 1920	1 July 1921
–	Sotir Peci	11 July 1921	16 October 1921
5	Hil Mosi	16 October 1921	6 December 1921
6	Haki Tefiku	6 December 1921	6 December 1921
7	Kristo Dako	7 December 1921	12 December 1921
8	Aleksandër Xhuvani	12 December 1921	24 December 1921
9	Rexhep Mitrovica	24 December 1921	25 February 1924
10	Fahri Rashiti	3 March 1924	10 June 1924
11	Stavro Vinjau	16 June 1924	24 December 1924
12	Kostaq Kotta	6 January 1925	31 January 1925
13	Xhafer Ypi	2 July 1927	16 January 1929
14	Abdurrahman Dibra	16 January 1929	5 March 1930
–	Hil Mosi	6 March 1930	7 December 1932
15	Mirash Ivanaj	11 January 1933	16 August 1935
16	Nush Bushati	21 October 1935	7 November 1936
17	Faik Shatku	9 November 1936	31 May 1938
–	Abdurrahman Dibra	31 May 1938	7 April 1939
18	Ernest Koliqi	12 April 1939	3 December 1941
19	Xhevat Korça	3 December 1941	4 January 1943
20	Rexhep Krasniqi	12 February 1943	28 April 1943
21	Zef Benusi	8 July 1943	14 September 1943
22	Koço Muka	7 February 1944	28 August 1944
23	Rrok Kolaj	6 September 1944	25 October 1944
24	Gjergj Kokoshi	23 October 1944	13 January 1945
25	Kostaq Cipo	13 January 1945	21 March 1946
26	Sejfulla Malëshova	22 March 1946	6 February 1948
27	Naxhije Dume	6 February 1948	1 October 1948
28	Kahreman Ylli	23 November 1948	9 April 1952
29	Bedri Spahiu	10 April 1952	21 June 1955
30	Ramiz Alia	21 June 1955	3 June 1958
31	Manush Myftiu	22 June 1958	22 June 1965
32	Thoma Deliana	23 June 1965	3 May 1976
33	Tefta Cami	3 May 1976	19 February 1987
34	Skënder Gjinushi	20 February 1987	21 February 1991
35	Kastriot Islami	22 February 1991	10 May 1991
36	Maqo Lakrori	11 May 1991	4 June 1991
*	Paskal Milo	11 June 1991	6 December 1991
37	Alfred Pema	18 December 1991	13 April 1992
38	Ylli Vejsiu	13 April 1992	6 April 1993
39	Xhezair Teliti	6 April 1993	10 July 1996
40	Edmond Lulja	11 July 1996	10 March 1997
41	Besnik Gjongecaj	11 July 1996	10 March 1997
42	Luan Skuqi	11 March 1997	24 July 1997
43	Et'hem Ruka	25 July 1997	6 September 2001
44	Ben Blushi	6 September 2001	29 January 2002
45	Luan Memushi	22 February 2002	1 September 2005
46	Genc Pollo	11 September 2005	30 July 2008
47	Fatos Beja	30 July 2008	17 September 2009
48	Myqerem Tafaj	17 September 2009	10 September 2013
49	Lindita Nikolla	15 September 2013	21 May 2017
50	Mirela Karabina	22 May 2017	11 September 2017
–	Lindita Nikolla	13 September 2017	17 January 2019
51	Besa Shahini	17 January 2019	14 September 2020
52	Evis Kushi	15 September 2020	9 September 2023
53	Ogerta Manastirliu	12 September 2023	19 September 2025
54	Mirela Kumbaro	19 September 2025	" Incumbent "

== Notes ==
- The title "Substitutive" (gheg albanian: Zavëndësisht), often using the acronym "Zav.", references to the temporary exercise of duty by an official who was not formally appointed by the prime minister but occupied the interim role of the vacant minister. These officials are labeled in the list with an asterisk.

== See also ==
- Education in Albania
- Council of Ministers (Albania)
