= Albanian Diaspora Summit =

Albanian government-organized diaspora conference

Albanian Diaspora Summit Samiti i Diasporës Shqiptare
- Status: Active
- Genre: Summit
- Frequency: Irregular (multi-year)
- Locations: Tirana, Albania
- Country: Albania
- Inaugurated: 18–20 November 2016
- Most recent: 13–15 April 2026
- Participants: Members of the Albanian diaspora, government officials, business, academia, and civil society representatives
- Organizer: Government of Albania

The Albanian Diaspora Summit (Albanian: Samiti i Diasporës Shqiptare) is an event organized by the Albanian government, which aims to bring together and serve as a platform for dialogue and cooperation between the Albanian diaspora from various countries around the world, representatives from Albanian institutions, business, academia and civil society.

The summit has received numerous criticisms from participants and various observers, regarding costs, effectiveness, dominance of political figures as wells as lack of real space for participants from the diaspora.

== History ==
The Albanian Diaspora Summit was first held in Tirana on 18-20 November 2016. Following the first summit, several governmental structures were established in association with it.

=== Editions ===
- Albanian Diaspora Summit I - 18–20 November 2016, Tirana, Albania
- Albanian Diaspora Summit II - 28 February – 2 March 2019, Tirana & Lezhë, Albania
- Albanian Diaspora Summit III - 22–23 November 2023, Tirana, Albania
- Albanian Diaspora Summit IV - 13–15 April 2026, Tirana, Albania

== Criticisms ==
The summit has been accompanied by criticism from participants and various observers:

- it has been described as a largely symbolic activity, where discussions do not translate into concrete policies or results, while some participants have questioned the effectiveness of the summit.
- participants from the diaspora have expressed dissatisfaction with the dominance of political figures and the lack of real space for diaspora voices, describing it as a "show" and as an exploitation of the diaspora merely for statistical purposes.
- concerns have been raised in regards to the costs and organization, and its cost-benefit ratio in relation to the achieved outcomes.
- clashes and tensions have been reported during discussion panels, where participants have raised issues regarding unfulfilled promises and the lack of mechanisms for the effective inclusion of the diaspora in policymaking.
