= Lindita Nikolla =

Albanian politician (born 1965)

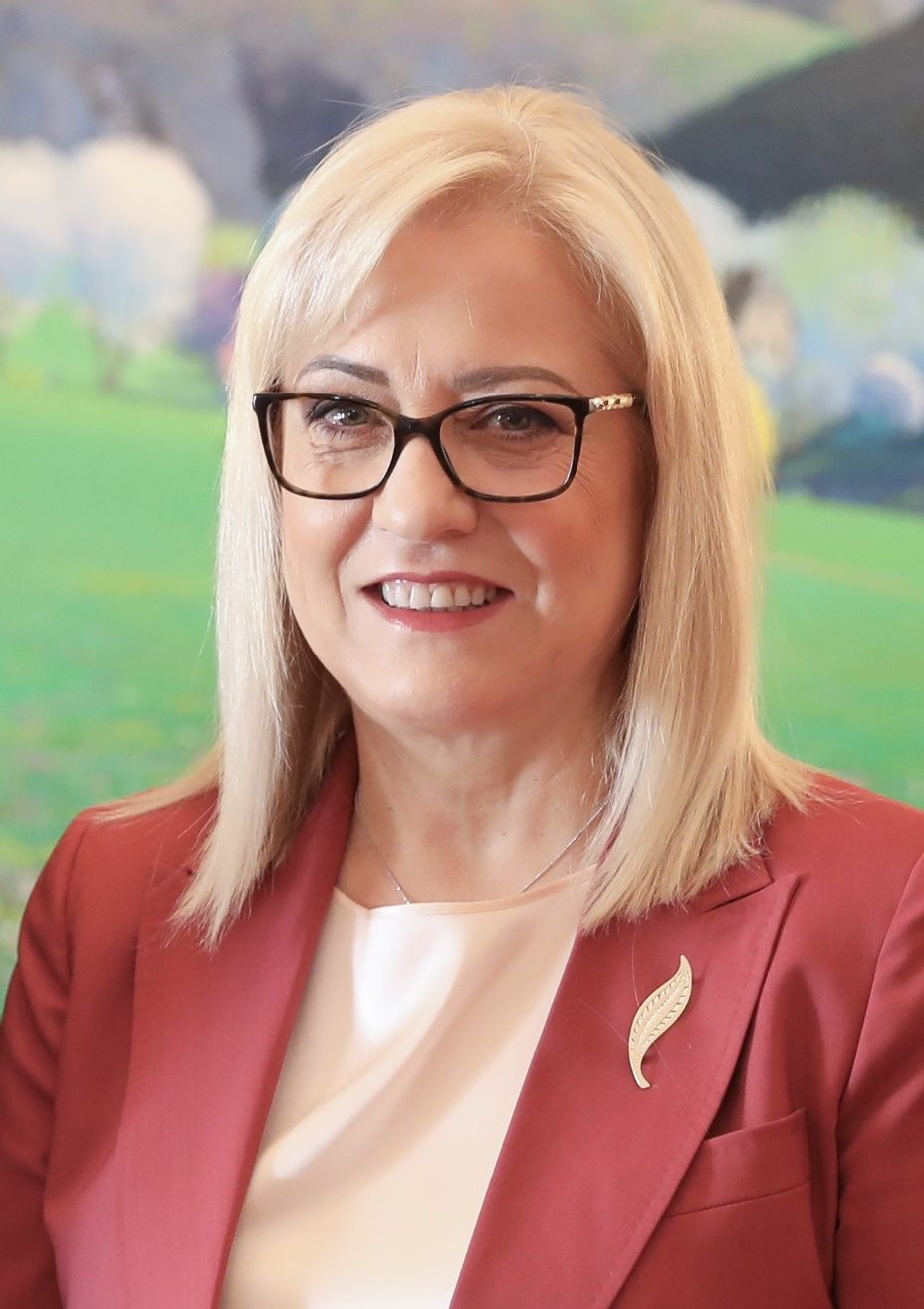
- Nikolla in 2023

38th Speaker of the Albanian Parliament
- In office 10 September 2021 – 30 July 2024
- Preceded by: Gramoz Ruçi
- Succeeded by: Elisa Spiropali

Minister of Education, Sports and Youth
- In office 15 September 2013 – 11 May 2017
- Prime Minister: Edi Rama
- Preceded by: Myqerem Tafaj
- Succeeded by: Mirela Karabina
- In office 13 September 2017 – 17 January 2019
- Prime Minister: Edi Rama
- Preceded by: Mirela Karabina (Education and Sports)
- Succeeded by: Besa Shahini

Personal details
- Born: October 22, 1965 (age 60) Tirana, PR Albania
- Party: Socialist Party
- Spouse: Ligor Nikolla
- Children: 1
- Education: University of Tirana; Albanian University

Lindita Nikolla (born 22 October 1965) is an Albanian retired politician who served as the Speaker of the Parliament from September 10, 2021, until her retirement from politics on July 28, 2024. Previously she served as the Minister of Education, Sports and Youth in September 2013 until May 2017, where she temporarily handed over the post to Mirela Karabina as part of a pre-election agreement between the position and the opposition. Nikolla was appointed again Minister of Education, Sports and Youth in September 2017 until 2019. In December 2018 a standoff occurred between Nikolla and students when she was minister, with the students protesting for multiple days, which expanded to the Union of Employees of Universities of Albania joining protests.

== Career ==
Lindita Nikolla was born on 22 October 1965 in Tirana, PR Albania. In 1989, she graduated from the University of Tirana with a degree in mathematics from the Faculty of Natural Sciences. From 2003 to 2006 she was elected as a Member of the Council of the Municipal Unit no. 1 in Tirana. In September 2007 she became a member of the Presidency of the Socialist Party.

Nikolla was elected Speaker of the Parliament on September 10, 2021. She was elected with the support of 79 deputies out of 140, which led deputies of the Democratic Party to cut up their forms for her nomination for the speakership in protest. In 2022 she met with Bärbel Bas, where she stated that her intention is the protect Euro-Atlantic values and reaffirmed Albania's support for Ukraine. She also stated in 2023 that she supported Albania's integration into the European Union. On July 27, 2024, she announced that she was resigning due to health reasons from the position.
