= List of members of the Kuvendi, 2009–2013 =

Parliament of Albania

This is a list of members of the Parliament of Albania following the outcome of the parliamentary election of 2009.

== Berat County ==
No.	Name	Party
1	Erion Braçe	Socialist Party
2	Ermonela Felaj	Socialist Party
3	Fidel Ylli	Socialist Party
4	Genc Pollo	Democratic Party
5	Lefter Maliqi	Democratic Party
6	Marko Bello	Socialist Party
7	Mehmet Xheka	Democratic Party
8	Nasip Naço	Socialist Movement for Integration

== Dibër County ==
No.	Name	Party
1	Bedri Hoxha	Democratic Party
2	Jemin Gjana	Democratic Party
3	Qemal Minxhozi	Socialist Party
4	Sadri Abazi	Socialist Party
5	Selami Xhepa	Democratic Party
6	Sherefedin Shehu	Democratic Party

== Durrës County ==
No.	Name	Party
1	Albana Vokshi	Democratic Party
2	Blendi Klosi	Socialist Party
3	Eduard Halimi	Democratic Party
4	Ferdinand Xhaferri^{1}	Democratic Party
5	Gazmend Oketa	New Democratic Spirit (formerly Democratic Party)
6	Gazmir Bizhga	Socialist Party
7	Hazir Gashi	Socialist Party
8	Igli Cara	Democratic Party
9	Klodiana Spahiu	Socialist Party
10	Lefter Koka	Socialist Movement for Integration
11	Osman Metalla	Democratic Party
12	Rudina Seseri^{7}	Socialist Party
13	Ylli Lama	Democratic Party

== Elbasan County ==
No.	Name	Party
1	Adriana Gjonaj	Democratic Party
2	Agim Leka	Socialist Party
3	Ardian Turku	Democratic Party
4	Damian Gjiknuri	Socialist Party
5	Dashnor Sula	Democratic Party
6	Ilir Bejtja	Socialist Party
7	Luçiano Boçi	Democratic Party
8	Lulzim Basha^{2}	Democratic Party
9	Rrahim Çota	Democratic Party
10	Shegush Ligori	Socialist Party
11	Skender Hasa	Socialist Party
12	Sybi Hida	Democratic Party
13	Taulant Balla	Socialist Party
14	Valentina Leskaj	Socialist Party

== Fier County ==
No.	Name	Party
1	Albert Çaçi	Socialist Party
2	Arben Çuko	Socialist Party
3	Armando Subashi	Socialist Party
4	Bashkim Fino	Socialist Party
5	Dritan Prifti	Independent (first LSI)
6	Enkelejd Alibeaj	Democratic Party
7	Ermelinda Meksi	Socialist Party
8	Ervin Koçi	Socialist Party
9	Fatos Beja	Democratic Party
10	Fatos Tushe^{3}	Socialist Party
11	Gramoz Ruci	Socialist Party
12	Ilir Bano	Democratic Party
13	Mesila Doda	Democratic Party
14	Piro Lutaj	Socialist Party
15	Sokol Olldashi	Democratic Party
16	Vasillaq Ngresi	Democratic Party

== Gjirokastër County ==
No.	Name	Party
1	Arta Dade	Socialist Party
2	Et’hem Ruka	Socialist Party
3	Genc Ruli	Democratic Party
4	Spiro Ksera	Democratic Party
5	Vangjel Tavo	Socialist Movement for Integration (first PS)

== Korçë County ==
No.	Name	Party
1	Alfred Dalipi	Socialist Party
2	Arben Ahmetaj	Socialist Party
3	Ben Blushi	Socialist Party
4	Edmond Spaho	Democratic Party
5	Fatbardh Kadilli	Democratic Party
6	Gjergji Papa	Democratic Party
7	Ismail Hoxha	Democratic Party
8	Ledina Aliolli	Democratic Party
9	Mimi Kodheli	Socialist Party
10	Olta Xhacka	Socialist Party
11	Pandeli Majko	Socialist Party
12	Ridvan Bode	Democratic Party

== Kukës County ==
No.	Name	Party
1	Asllan Dogjani	Socialist Party
2	Besnik Dushaj	Democratic Party
3	Fatos Hoxha	Democratic Party
4	Flamur Noka	Democratic Party

== Lezhë County ==
No.	Name	Party
1	Armando Prenga	Socialist Party
2	Edi Paloka	Democratic Party
3	Gjok Jaku^{4}	Socialist Party
4	Gjovalin Kadeli	Socialist Party
5	Mark Marku	Democratic Party
6	Pavlina Hoti	Democratic Party
7	Rrajmond Hoxha	Democratic Party

== Shkodër County ==
No.	Name	Party
1	Arenca Trashani	Democratic Party
2	Astrit Bushati	Democratic Party
3	Astrit Beci	Socialist Party
4	Gëzim Dibra^{5}	Democratic Party
5	Gjok Uldedaj	Democratic Party
6	Ilir Beqja	Socialist Party
7	Jozefina Topalli	Democratic Party
8	Ndue Paluca	Democratic Party
9	Ndue Kola	Socialist Party
10	Paulin Sterkaj	Democratic Party
11	Tom Doshi	Socialist Party

== Tirana County ==
No.	Name	Party
1	Aldo Bumçi	Democratic Party
2	Andis Harasani	Socialist Party
3	Arben Imami	Democratic Party
4	Artan Gaçi	Socialist Party
5	Besnik Baraj	Socialist Party
6	Bujar Nishani	Democratic Party
7	Dashamir Peza	Socialist Party
8	Ditmir Bushati	Socialist Party
9	Eduard Shalsi	Socialist Party
10	Eglantina Gjermeni	Socialist Party
11	Enkelejda Shkreli	Socialist Party
12	Fatmir Mediu	Republican Party
13	Fatmir Xhafaj	Socialist Party
14	Florian Mima	Democratic Party
15	Gent Strazimiri	Democratic Party
16	Gerti Bogdani	Democratic Party
17	Ilir Rusmali	Democratic Party
18	Ilir Meta	Socialist Movement for Integration
19	Ilir Gjoni	Socialist Party
20	Kastriot Islami	Independent (first Socialist Party)
21	Lajla Pernaska	Democratic Party
22	Luan Skuqi	Democratic Party
23	Majlinda Bregu	Democratic Party
24	Myqerem Tafaj	Democratic Party
25	Namik Dokle	Socialist Party
26	Rajmonda Bulku	Democratic Party
27	Sajmir Tahiri	Socialist Party
28	Sali Berisha	Democratic Party
29	Tritan Shehu	Democratic Party
30	Vasilika Hysi	Socialist Party
31	Viktor Gumi	Democratic Party
32	Xhemal Qefalia	Socialist Party

== Vlorë County ==
No.	Name	Party
1	Arben Isaraj	Socialist Party
2	Arben Malaj	Socialist Party
3	Ardian Kollozi^{6}	Democratic Party
4	Astrit Patozi	Democratic Party
5	Dashamir Tahiri	PDIU (formerly PDU)
6	Eltar Deda	Socialist Party
7	Fatmir Toci	Socialist Party
8	Kreshnik Çipi	Democratic Party
9	Leonard Demi	Democratic Party
10	Luiza Xhuvani	Socialist Party
11	Shpetim Idrizi	PDIU (formerly PS/PDI)
12	Vangjel Dule	Unity for Human Rights Party

== Replaced members ==
1. Ferdinand Xhaferraj resigned for candidature for Durrës at the Albanian local elections in 2011. He was replaced by Ndriçim Babasi.
2. Lulzim Basha resigned for candidature for Tirana at the Albanian local elections in 2011. He was replaced by Kosta Barka.
3. Fatos Tushe resigned for candidature for Lushnje at the Albanian local elections in 2011. He was replaced by Arion Muçaj.
4. Gjok Jaku resigned for candidature for Lezha at the Albanian local elections in 2011. He was replaced by Ndrec Deda.
5. Gëzim Dibra died during office, for that reason he is replaced by Ramiz Çobaj.
6. Adrian Kollozi resigned for candidature for Vlorë at the Albanian local elections in 2011. He was replaced by Aurel Bylykbashi.
7. Rudina Seseri resigned
