= 27th Kuvendi =

Twenty-seventh Legislature of Albania Legjislatura e njëzet e shtatë e Shqipërisë
- XXVII Legislature; VI Pluralist Legislature

Type
- Type: Unicameral
- Term limits: Four years

History
- Founded: September 2, 2005
- Disbanded: September 7, 2009
- Preceded by: 26th Legislature
- Succeeded by: 28th Legislature

Leadership
- Speaker of the Parliament: Jozefina Topalli, PD
- Prime Minister: Sali Berisha

Structure
- Seats: 140 deputies
- Political groups: Government (80): PD (56); PR (11); PDR (4); PAA (4); PBDNJ (2); PDK (2); BLD (1); Opposition (60): PS (42); PSD (7); LSI (5); AD (3); PDS (2); Independent

Elections
- Last election: 3 July 2005

Website
- www.parlament.al

The Twenty-seventh Legislature of Albania (Albanian: Legjislatura e njëzet e shtatë), officially known as the VI Pluralist Legislature of Albania (Albanian: Legjislatura e VI Pluraliste e Shqipërisë), was the legislature of Albania following the 2005 Albanian Parliamentary election of Members of Parliament (MPs) to the Albanian Parliament. The party of the Prime Minister Sali Berisha, PD, obtained majority of 80 deputies.

== 27th Legislature ==
The two largest political parties in Albania are the Socialist Party (PS) and the Democratic Party (PD). Following is a list of political parties and alliances with representation in the Parliament by the 2005 elections.

Name	Abbr.	Founded	Leader	Ideology	MPs
Democratic Party of Albania Partia Demokratike e Shqipërisë	PD	1990	Sali Berisha	Liberal conservatism, Conservatism, Centre-right	56 / 140
Socialist Party of Albania Partia Socialiste e Shqipërisë	PS	1991	Fatos Nano	Social democracy, Centre-left	42 / 140
Republican Party of Albania Partia Republikane e Shqipërisë	PR	1991	Fatmir Mediu	National conservatism, Social conservatism, Centre-right	11 / 140
Social Democratic Party of Albania Partia Socialdemokrate e Shqipërisë	PSD	1991	Skënder Gjinushi	Social democracy, Centre-left	7 / 140
Socialist Movement for Integration Partia Lëvizja Socialiste për Integrim	LSI	1991	Ilir Meta	Social democracy, Centre-left	5 / 140
New Democratic Party Partia Demokrate e Re	PDR	1999	Genc Pollo	Liberal conservatism, Conservatism, Centre-right	4 / 140
Agrarian Party of Albania Partia Agrare e Shqipërisë	PAA	1991	Lufter Xhuveli	Agrarianism, Centre	4 / 140
Democratic Alliance Party (Albania) Partia Aleanca Demokratike	AD	1992	Neritan Ceka	Liberalism, Centre	3 / 140
Unity for Human Rights Party Partia Bashkimi për të Drejtat e Njeriut	PBDNJ	1992	Vangjel Dule	Social Liberalism, Greek minority interests, Centre	2 / 140
Social Democracy Party of Albania Partia Demokracia Sociale e Shqipërisë	PDS	2003	Paskal Milo	Social democracy, Centre-left	2 / 140
Demochristian Party of Albania Partia Demokristiane e Shqipërisë	PDK	1991	Nard Ndoka	Christian democracy, Centre-right	2 / 140
Liberal Democratic Union (Albania) Bashkimi Liberal Demokrat	BLD	1995	Arian Starova	Liberalism, Social democracy, Centre	1 / 140
Independents Të pavarur				Independent	1 / 140

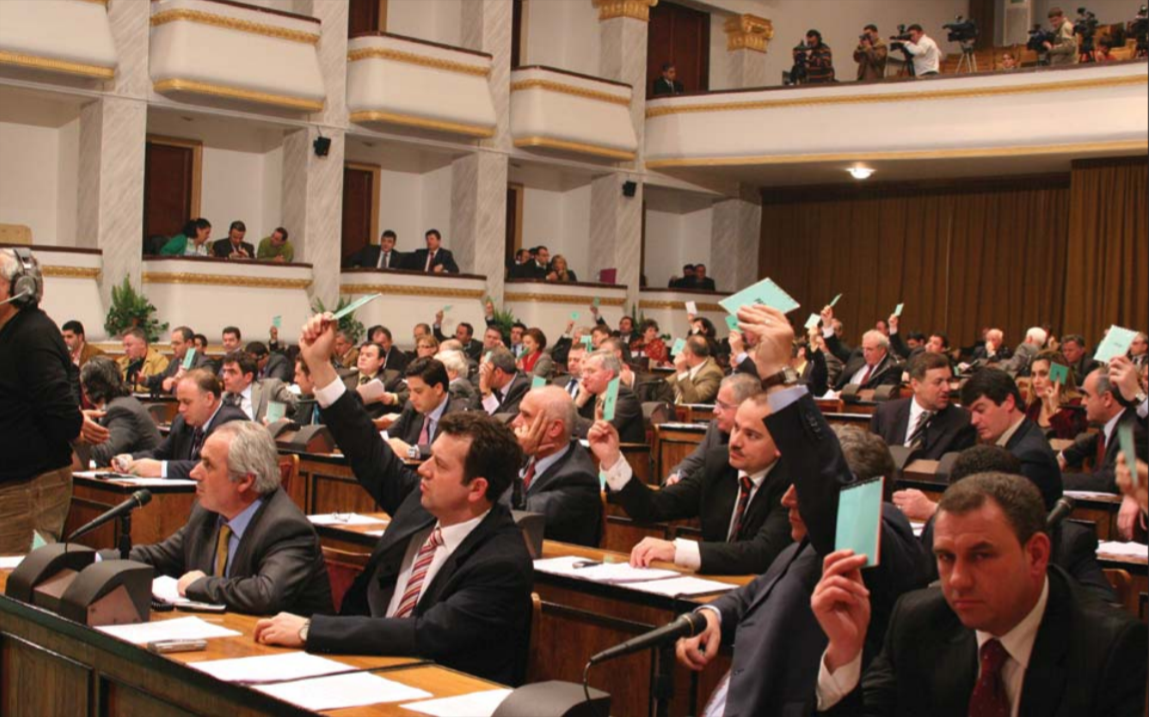
Legislature XVII Albania Opening Session (2005 - 2009)

== MPS ==
Deputies from the XVII session consisted of the following members:

Democratic Party Deputies	Socialist Party Deputies	Republican Party Deputies	Social Democratic Party Deputies	Socialist Movement for Integration Party Deputies	New Democratic Deputies	Democratic Alliance Deputies	Agrarian Party Deputies	PBDNJ Deputies	Social Democracy Deputies	PDK Deputies	BLD Deputies	Independents
Astrit Bushati	Paulin Sterkaj	Fatmir Mediu	Skënder Gjinushi	Ilir Meta	Frrok Gjini	Neritan Ceka	Lufter Xhuveli	Vangjel Dule	Paskal Milo	Nard Ndoka	Arian Starova	Spiro Peçi
Ramiz Çobaj	Tom Doshi	Albert Faruku	Engjëll Bejtja	Pëllumb Xhufi	Genc Pollo	Pirro Lutaj	Ymer Tola	Leonard Solis	Hamit Kosta	Nikollë Lesi		
Gilman Bakalli	Qemal Tahiri	Hajrulla Paturi	Pajtim Bello	Sabit Brokaj	Tritan Shehu	Pashko Ujka	Petrit Gjoni			Ndue Shpani		
Arenca Trashani	Sadri Abazi	Artur Hasanbelliu	Ferdinand Ibrahimi	Ndre Legisi	Jak Ndokaj		Nikollaq Nërenxi					
Jozefina Topalli	Ermelinda Meksi	Robinson Lipe	Diana Çuli	Dritan Prifti								
Rexhep Uka	Andis Harasani	Alfred Gega	Angjelina Kola									
Jemin Gjana	Shpëtim Idrizi	Galip Ramadhi	Ingrid Shuli									
Fatos Hoxha	Musa Ulqini	Besnik Bisha										
Aldo Bumçi	Durim Lamaj	Parid Teferiçi										
Preç Zogaj	Durim Hushi	Lajla Pernaska										
Gjovalin Prenga	Taulant Dedja	Genc Sharku										
Gjokë Vuksani	Bukurosh Stafa	Arian Madhi										
Pal Dajçi	Valentina Leskaj											
Idriz Xhumara	Namik Dokle											
Sali Shehu	Ndriçim Hysa											
Rahim Kaleci	Elmaz Sherifi											
Shkëlqim Ziri	Taulant Balla											
Ndriçim Babasi	Rrapush Tola											
Sami Gjergji	Arta Dade											
Sokol Olldashi	Albert Çaçi											
Flori Bajramaj	Petro Koçi											
Ferdinat Xhaferri	Fatmir Xhindi											
Gazmend Oketa	Ylli Bufi											
Genc Juka	Blendi Klosi											
Bamir Topi	Rajmonda Stefa											
Besnik Mustafaj	Kastriot Islami											
Lulzim Basha	Erion Braçe											
Bujar Nishani	Marko Bello											
Ylli Pango	Luan Memushi											
Majlinda Bregu	Bashkim Fino											
Gëzim Karapici	Ben Blushi											
Spartak Ngjela	Pandeli Majko											
Safet Sula	Fatmir Xhafaj											
Astrit Patozi	Alfred Dalipi											
Leonard Demi	Flamur Hoxha											
Sali Berisha	Gramoz Ruçi											
Engjëll Cara	Vangjel Tavo											
Luan Skuqi	Arben Malaj											
Dashnor Sula	Arben Isaraj											
Aurel Bylykbashi	Besnik Dervishi											
Blerim Çela	Fatos Nano											
Ilir Bano	Stefan Çipa											
Mehmet Xheka												
Ridvan Bode												
Edmond Spaho												
Mehmet Hoxha												
Genci Ruli												
Bujar Lekaj												
Ardian Kollozi												
Besnik Xhidra												

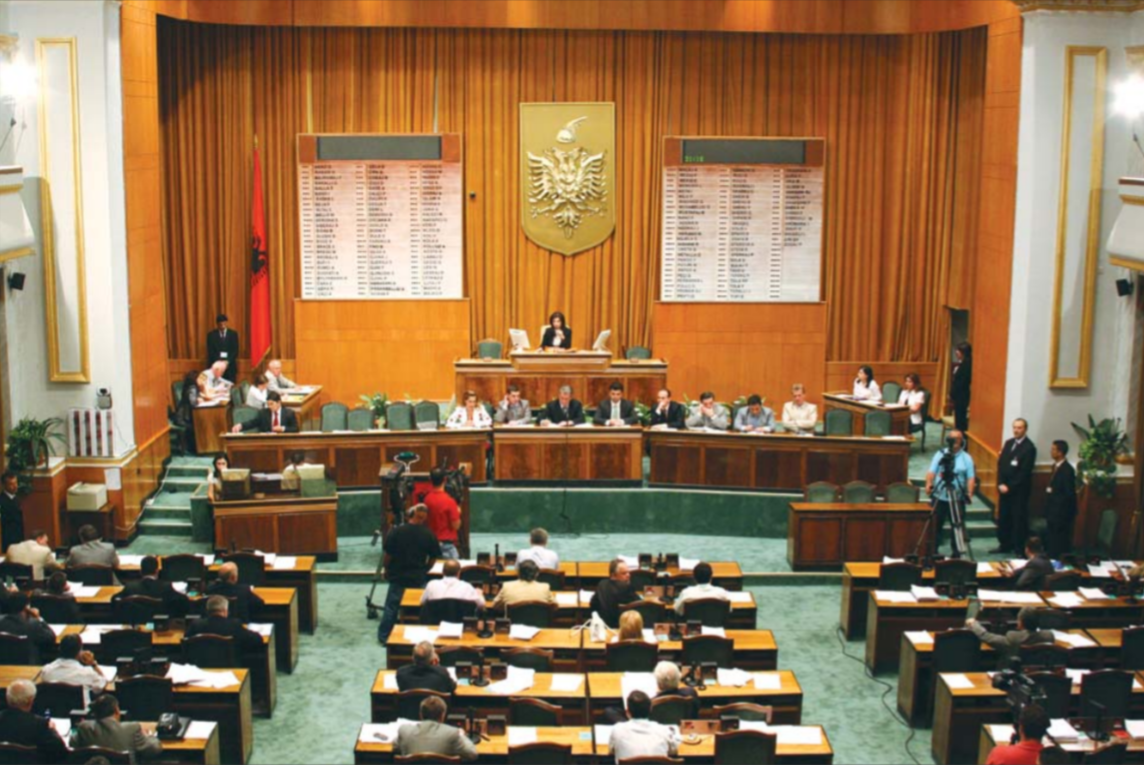
Legislature XVII Session (2005 - 2009)
