= Hodžić =

Hodžić (Cyrillic: Хоџић, pronounced [xôd͡ʒitɕ]) is a common family name found in Bosnia and Herzegovina, Montenegro, Croatia, Serbia and Slovenia. It is derived from the word hodža, meaning "master/lord", itself a Turkish loanword (hoca) of ultimately Persian origin (khawaja). Its literal meanings are "little hodža" or "son of the hodža".

Its bearers are predominantly Bosniaks. It may refer to:

- Adnan Hodžić (basketball player, born 1971) (born 1971), Bosnian basketball player
- Adnan Hodžić (born 1988), Bosnian-American basketball player
- Adrijana Hodžić (born 1975), Kosovar politician
- Admir Hodžić (born 1985), Serbian biathlonist
- Aida Abadžić Hodžić (born 1970), art historian and art critic
- Ajla Hodžić (born 1980), Bosnian-American actress
- Alen Hodžić (born 1992), Slovenian basketball player
- Almina Hodžić (born 1988), Bosnian footballer
- Buba Corelli a.k.a. Amar Hodžić (born 1989), Bosnian rapper
- Amar Hodžić (born 1999), Austrian footballer of Bosnian descent
- Armin Hodžić (footballer, born 1994), Bosnian footballer
- Armin Hodžić (footballer, born 2000) (born 2000), Bosnian footballer
- Armin Hodžić (politician), Bosniak-Croatian politician
- Asim Hodžić (born 1922, died 1994), Yugoslav general in JNA
- Avdo Hodžić (born 1921, died 1943), recipient of the Order of the People's Hero of Yugoslavia
- Dušan Hodžić (born 1993), Serbian footballer
- Edin Hodzic (born 1977), Austrian footballer
- Edin Hodžić (born 1986), Serbian biathlonist
- Edvin Hodžić (1994–2018), Austrian footballer
- Fahrudin Hodžić (born 1963), Bosnian wrestler
- Faruk Hodžić (born 2003), Bosnian footballer
- Fikret Hodžić (born 1953, died 1992), Bosnian bodybuilder
- Husein Hodžić (born 1913, died 1942), recipient of the Order of the People's Hero of Yugoslavia
- Kadir Hodžić (born 1994), Bosnian footballer
- Mario Hodžić (born 1998), Montenegrin karateka
- Mehdin Hodžić, Bosnian war hero
- Mina Hodzic (born 2002), German tennis player
- Mislav Hodžić (born 1977), Croatian presbyter
- Redžep Hodžić (born 1994), Serbian biathlonist
- Šefka Hodžić (born 1943), infamous criminal from Bosnia
- Šefko Hodžić (born 1945), Bosnian writer and journalist
- Selver Hodžić (born 1978), Bosnian-Swiss footballer
- Tarik Hodžić (born 1951), Bosnian footballer
- Tarik Hodžić (table tennis) (born 1972), Bosnian table tennis player
- Zuvdija Hodžić (born 1943), Yugoslav and Montenegrin writer, songwriter, journalist and academic

== See also ==
- Hoxha, Albanian equivalent
- Hadžić
- Hodžići (Vareš)
- Hodžići (Kakanj)
- Hodžići, Bileća
