= Hoxha (surname) =

Origin
- Meaning: Lord, khawaja (Persian: خواجه, romanized: khvājeh; Arabic: خواجة, romanized: khawājah)

Other names
- Variant form: Hodžić (South Slavs)

Hoxha (pronounced [ˈhɔdʒa]) is an Albanian surname, derived from the Persian title khawaja ("master") via Turkish hoca. Hoxha is the most common surname in Albania and the 9th most common surname in Kosovo. Notable people with the surname include:

== Politics and diplomacy ==
- Arianit Hoxha, Albanian politician
- Bedri Hoxha, Albanian politician
- Enver Hoxha (1908–1985), Communist leader of Albania in 1944–1985
- Ervin Hoxha (born 1978), Albanian politician
- Fadil Hoxha (1916–2001), Yugoslav politician and Kosovo's leader during the time of Tito
- Fatos Hoxha, Albanian politician
- Ferit Hoxha (born 1967), Albanian diplomat
- Hysen Hoxha (1861–1934), a signatory of the Albanian Declaration of Independence; uncle of Enver Hoxha
- Ilir Hoxha (born 1949), Albanian communist
- Ismail Hoxha, Albanian politician
- Joe Hoxha, American politician
- Nexhmije Hoxha (1921–2020), Albanian politician, wife of Enver Hoxha
- Rajmond Hoxha, Albanian politician
- Teuta Hoxha, Palestine Action hunger striker

== Sport and games ==
- Adriatik Hoxha (born 1990), Albanian athlete
- Alban Hoxha (born 1987), Albanian football goalkeeper
- Altin Hoxha (born 1990), Albanian footballer
- Arber Hoxha (born 1998), Albanian footballer
- Bujar Hoxha, Albanian chess master
- Edmond Hoxha (born 1997), Albanian football player
- Erand Hoxha (born 1985), Albanian footballer
- Fabio Hoxha (born 1993), Albanian football player
- Florian Hoxha (born 2001), Kosovan footballer
- Genc Hoxha (born 1957), Kosovan football coach and former player
- Hamels Hoxha (born 1992), Albanian footballer
- Ismet Hoxha (born 1948), Albanian footballer
- Medjon Hoxha (born 1999), Kosovan footballer
- Rigers Hoxha (born 1985), Albanian footballer
- Rustem Hoxha (born 1991), Albanian footballer
- Sidni Hoxha (born 1992), Albanian swimmer
- Sulejman Hoxha (born 1990), Albanian footballer
- Yll Hoxha (born 1987), Kosovar football player

== Other fields ==
- Anna Hoxha, known as Anna Oxa (born 1961), Italian singer
- Dritan Hoxha (1968–2008), Albanian businessman
- Gazmend Hoxha (born 1977), Kosovan police officer
- Iljas Mirahori (Iljaz Hoxha), 15th-century Albanian Janissary, scientist, and teacher of an Ottoman sultan
- Lori Hoxha (born 1993), Albanian media executive, entrepreneur and television producer
- Luan Hoxha (born 1960), Chief of General Staff of the Armed Forces of Albania in 2006–2008
- Sara Hoxha (born 1996), Albanian media executive and television executive producer
- Zulfi Hoxha (born 1992), Albanian-American terrorist
