= Hodžići =

Hodžići may refer to:

- Hodžići, Bileća, a village in Republika Srpska, Bosnia and Herzegovina
- Hodžići (Kakanj), a village in Zenica-Doboj Canton, Federation of Bosnia and Herzegovina, Bosnia and Herzegovina
- Hodžići, Vareš, a village in Zenica-Doboj Canton, Federation of Bosnia and Herzegovina, Bosnia and Herzegovina
