= Albania–Austria relations =

- Albania: Austria

The history of bilateral relations between Albania and Austria dates back to 1912, when Albania declared its independence on 28 November 1912. Albania has an embassy in Vienna. Austria has an embassy in Tirana. As a EU member, Austria supports Albania in its EU membership path. Both countries are members of the Council of Europe and Organization for Security and Co-operation in Europe(OSCE).

== History ==
During World War II, some Albanian nationals (likely of Jewish origin), of whom 1 had died there, were imprisoned in a subcamp of the Mauthausen concentration camp in Melk in German-annexed Austria.

== Trade and Bilateral Cooperation ==
Diplomatic relations between Albania and Austria have traditionally been close and are currently governed by a complex set of treaties (including those with the European Union (EU), of which Austria is a member).

- Tirana 1973 - Passenger and Carriage on the Road
- Vienna 1987 - Cooperation Agreement in Culture, Science, Technology
- Tirana 1991 - Development assistance
- Tirana 1992 - Travel Documents, Visas
- Vienna 1993 - Investment protection
- Vienna 1993 - Aviation
- Vienna 1994 - Economical and Industrial co-operation, Investments
- Vienna 1998 - Cultural and Historical buildings and monuments protection
- Tirana 2005 - Cooperation Agreement in Culture, Science, Technology
- Vienna 2007 - Customs Agreement
- Tirana 2007 - International Security
- Tirana 2007 - Double taxation
- Tirana 2008 - Development assistance
- Vienna 2010 - Health
- Tirana 2010 - Financial aid
- Vienna 2012 - Scientific and Technical cooperation
- Both 2012 - Culture, Education and Science
- Vienna 2013 - Refugee and Migration control

Trade between Albania and Austria has grown steadily in recent years, reflecting deepening economic ties between the two countries. In 2023, Albania exported $70.4M to Austria, mainly ferroalloys, leather footwear, and men's suits, while Austria exported $88.7M to Albania, including electric generating sets, flavored water, and air conditioners

== High level visits ==
| Guest | Host | Place of visit | Date of visit |
|---|---|---|---|
| (Austria) Foreign Minister Michael Spindelegger | (Albania) Foreign Minister Bujar Nishani | Tirana | 22 November 2012 |
| (Albania) Minister of European Integration Klajda Gjosha | (Austria) General Secretary for Europe, Integration and Foreign Affairs Michael Linhart | Vienna | 29 April 2014 |
| (Austria) President Heinz Fischer | (Albania) President Bujar Nishani and Prime Minister Edi Rama | Tirana | 20 May 2014 |
| (Austria) Foreign Minister Sebastian Kurz | (Albania) Foreign Minister Ditmir Bushati and Prime Minister Edi Rama | Tirana | 17 June 2014 |
| (Albania) Minister of European Integration Klajda Gjosha | (Austria) General Secretary for Europe, Integration and Foreign Affairs Michael Linhart | Vienna | 23 June 2016 |

== Gallery ==
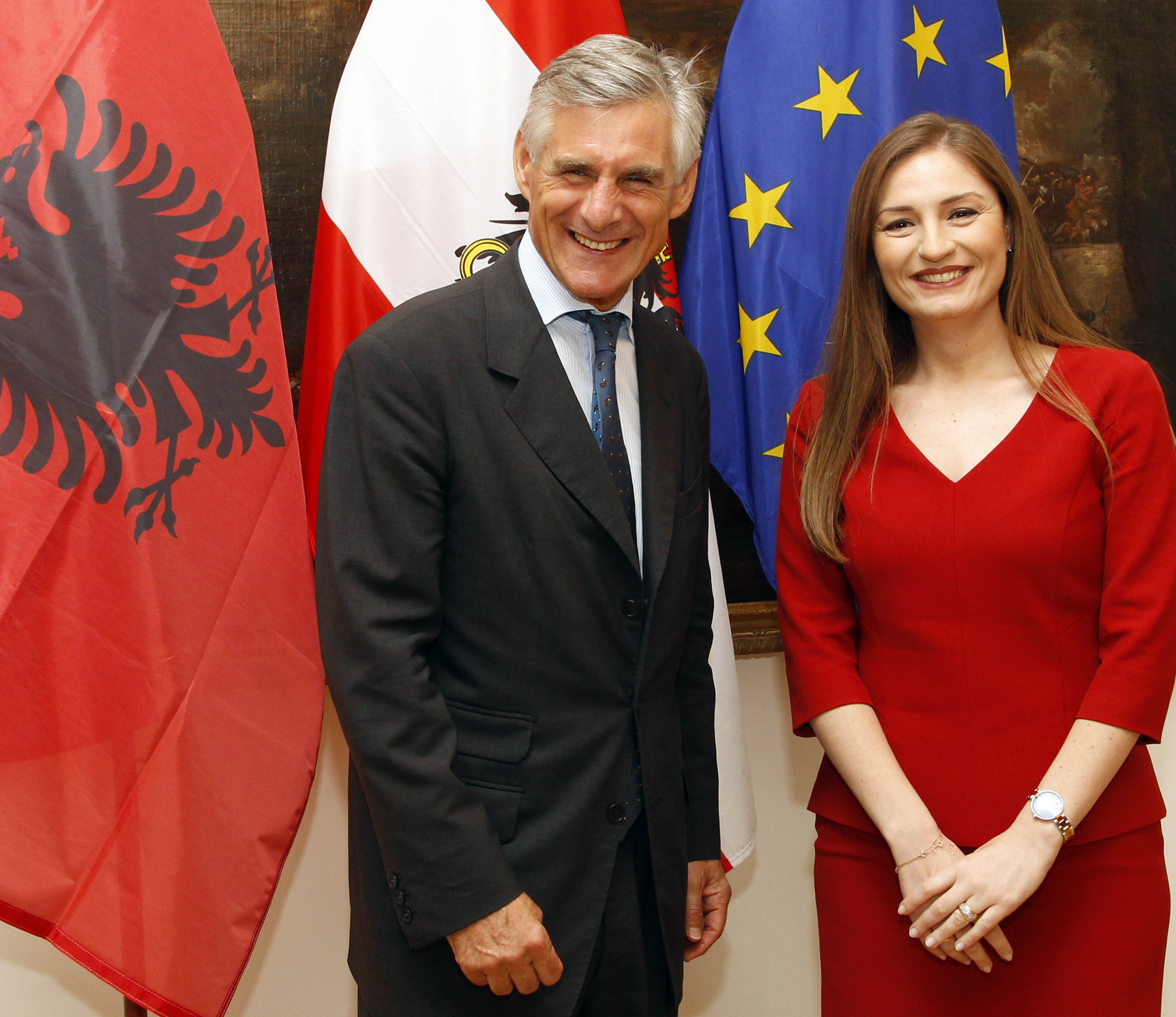
23 June 2016

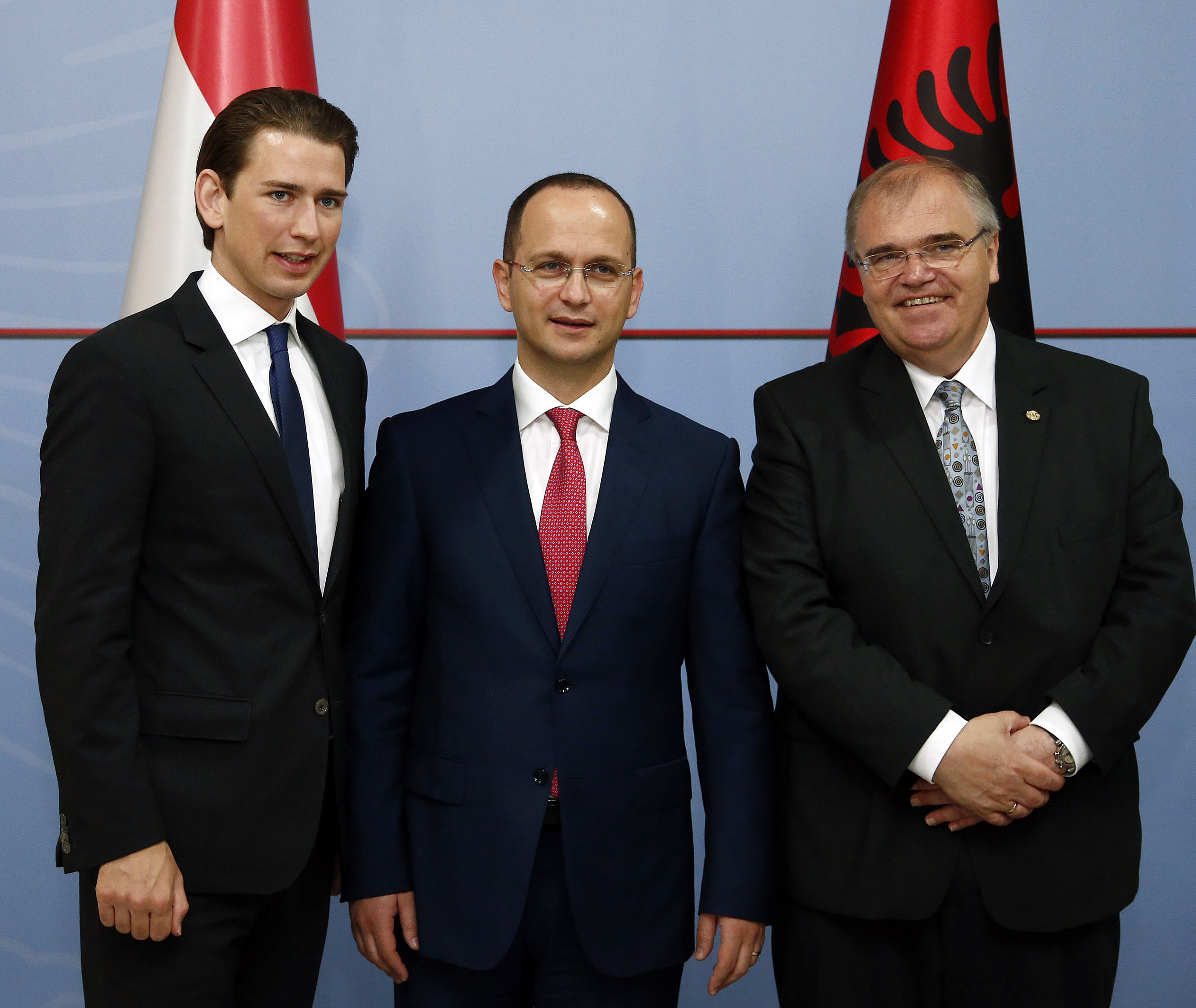
17 June 2014

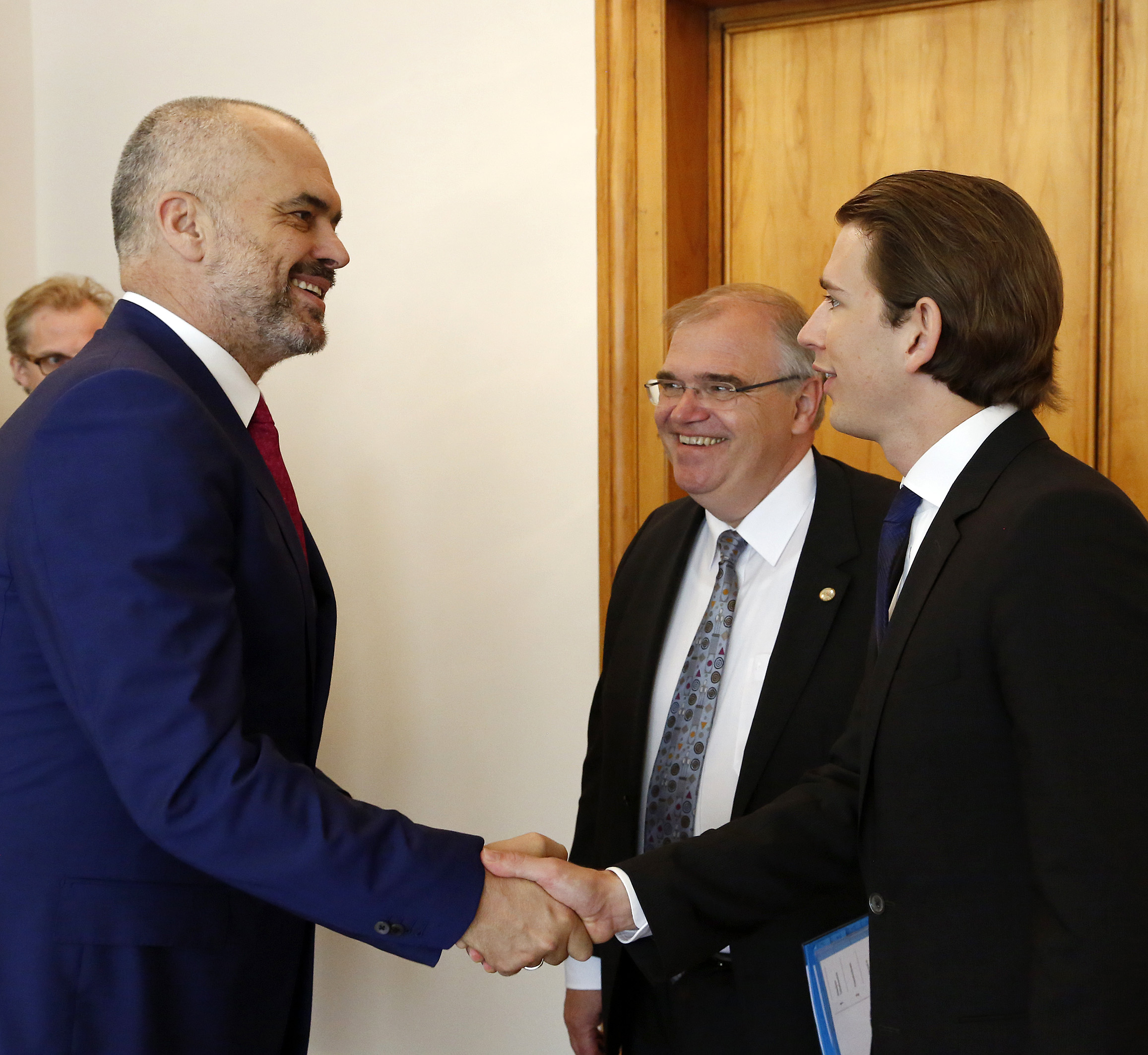
17 June 2014

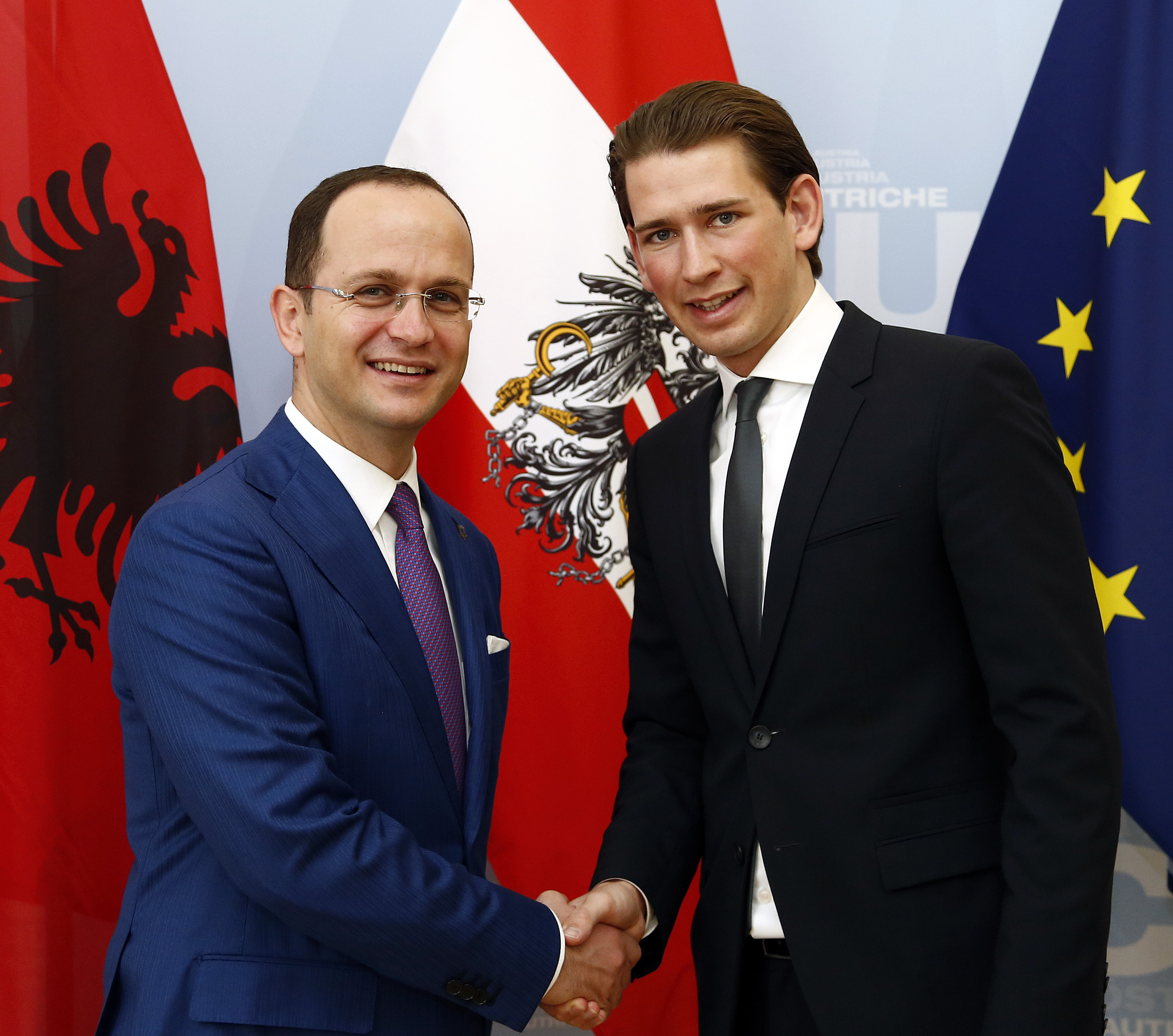
17 June 2014

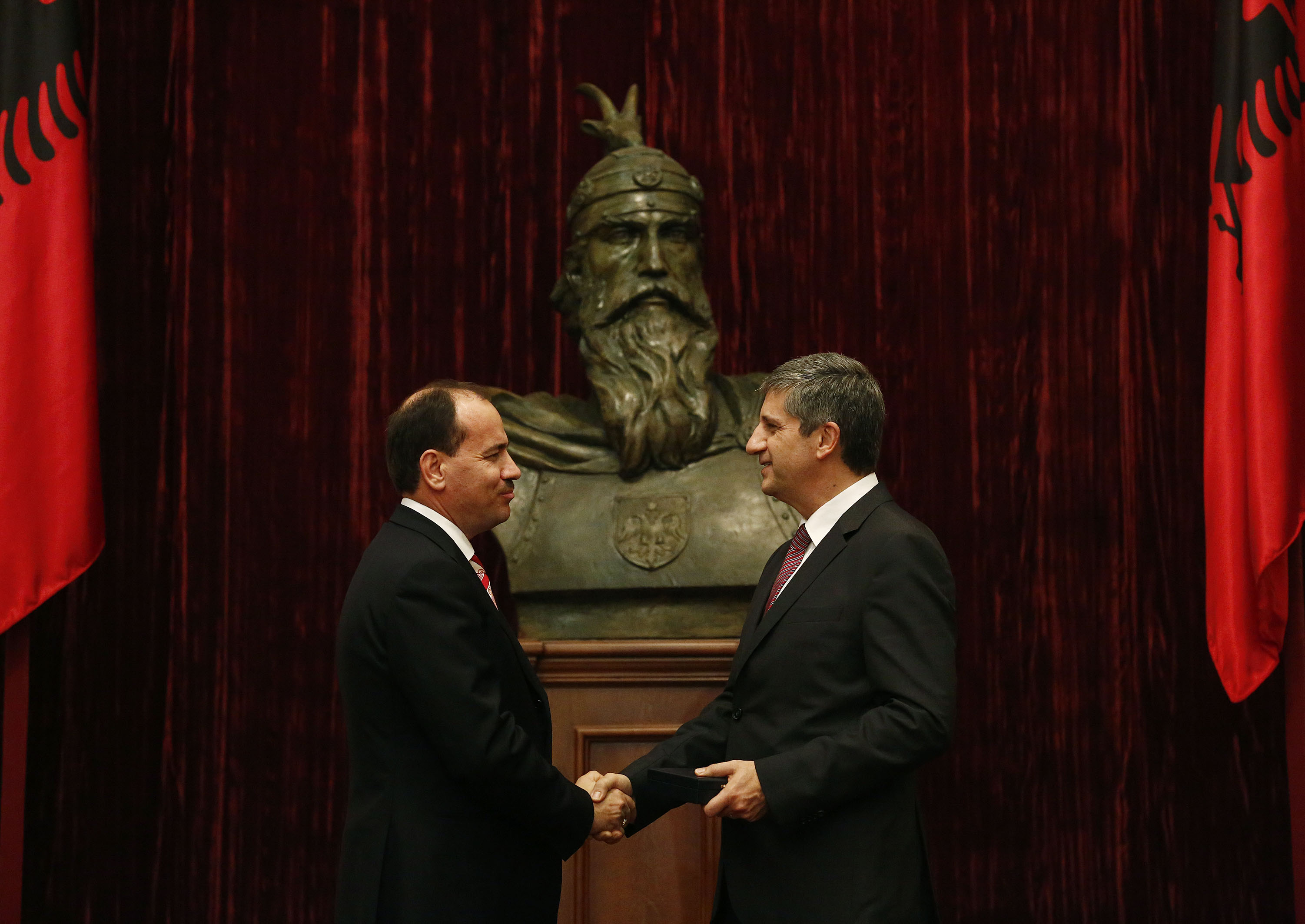
22 November 2012

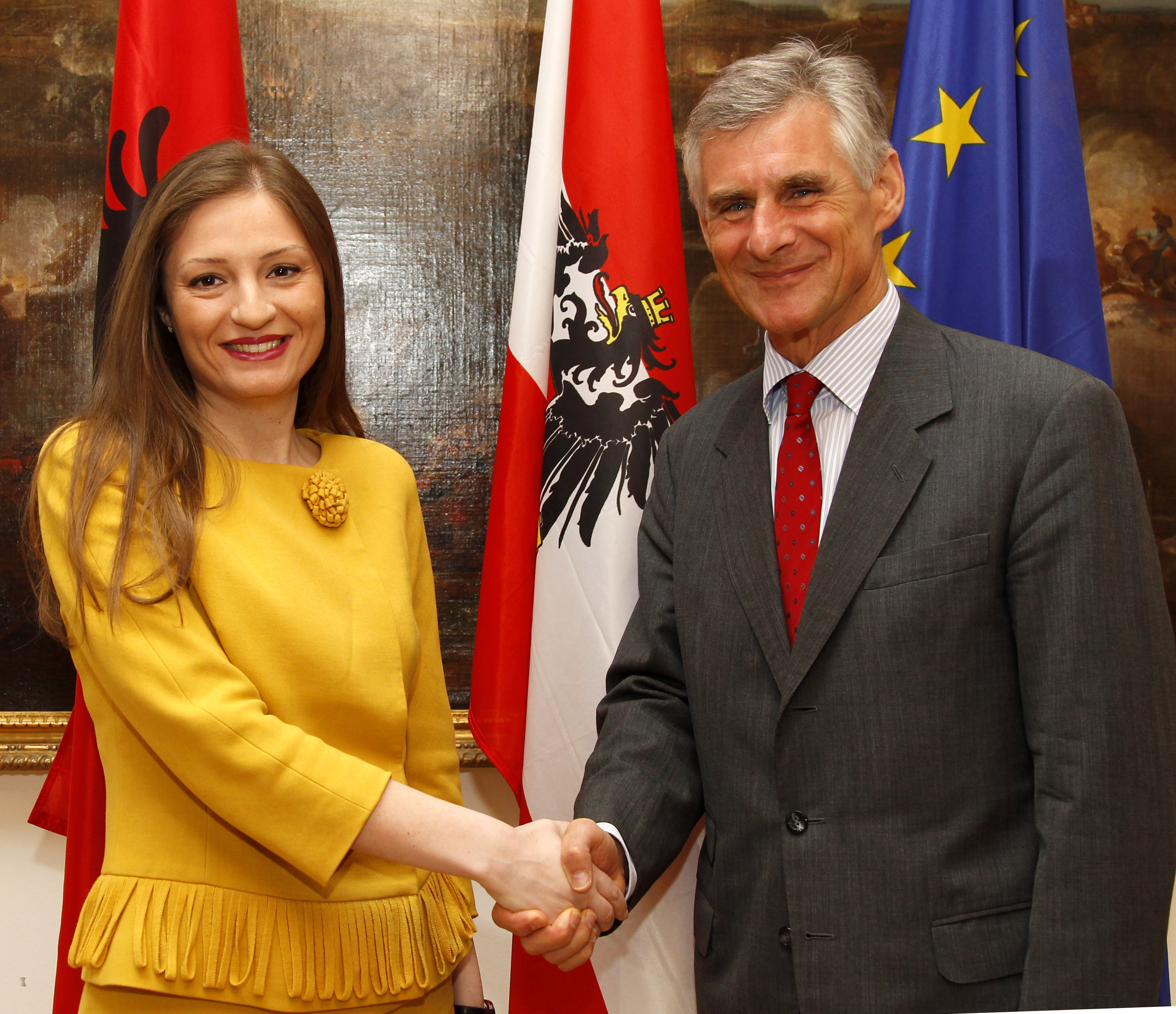
29 April 2014

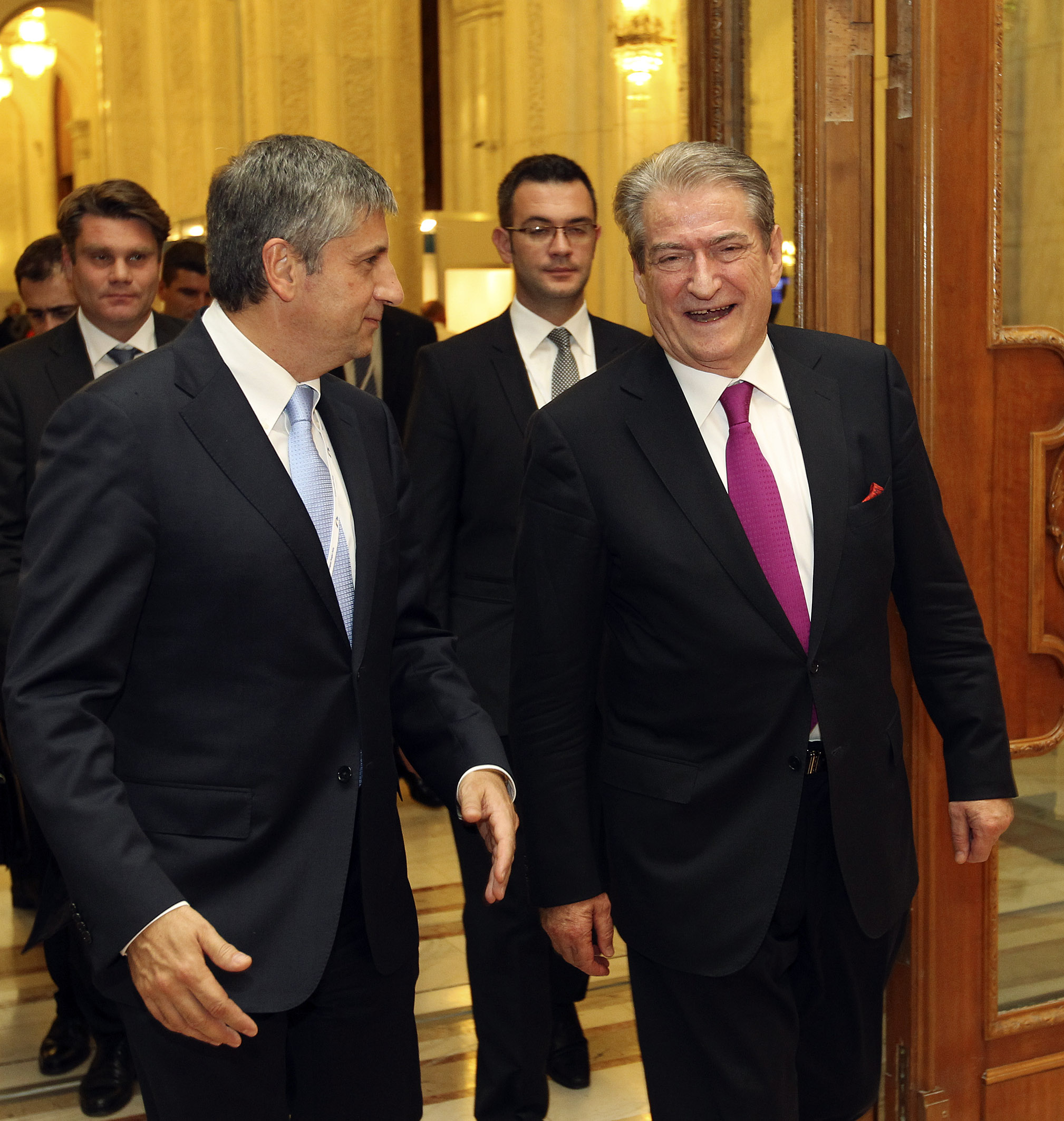
17 October 2012

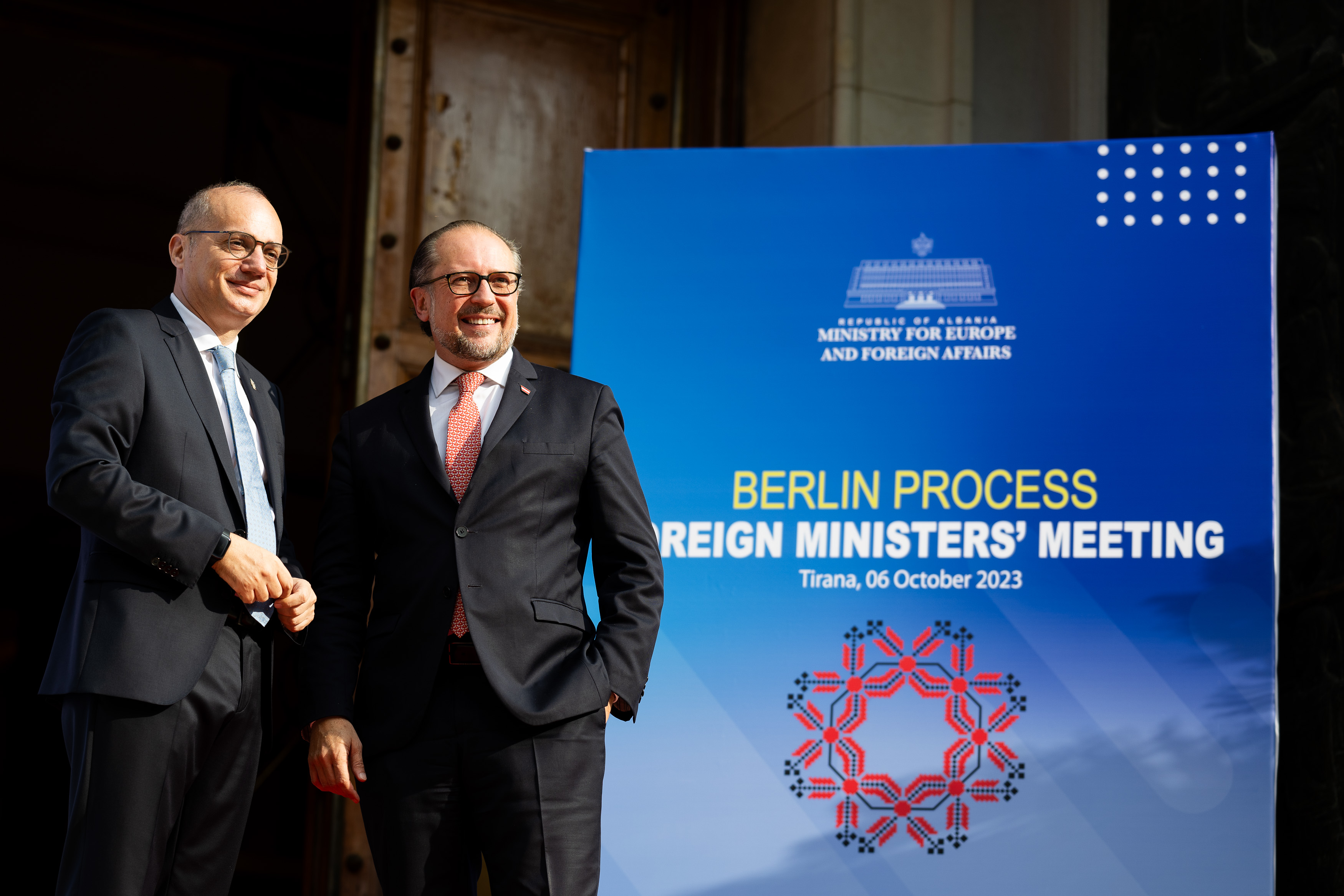
06 October 2023

== Resident diplomatic mission ==
- Albania has an embassy in Vienna.
- Austria has an embassy in Tirana.
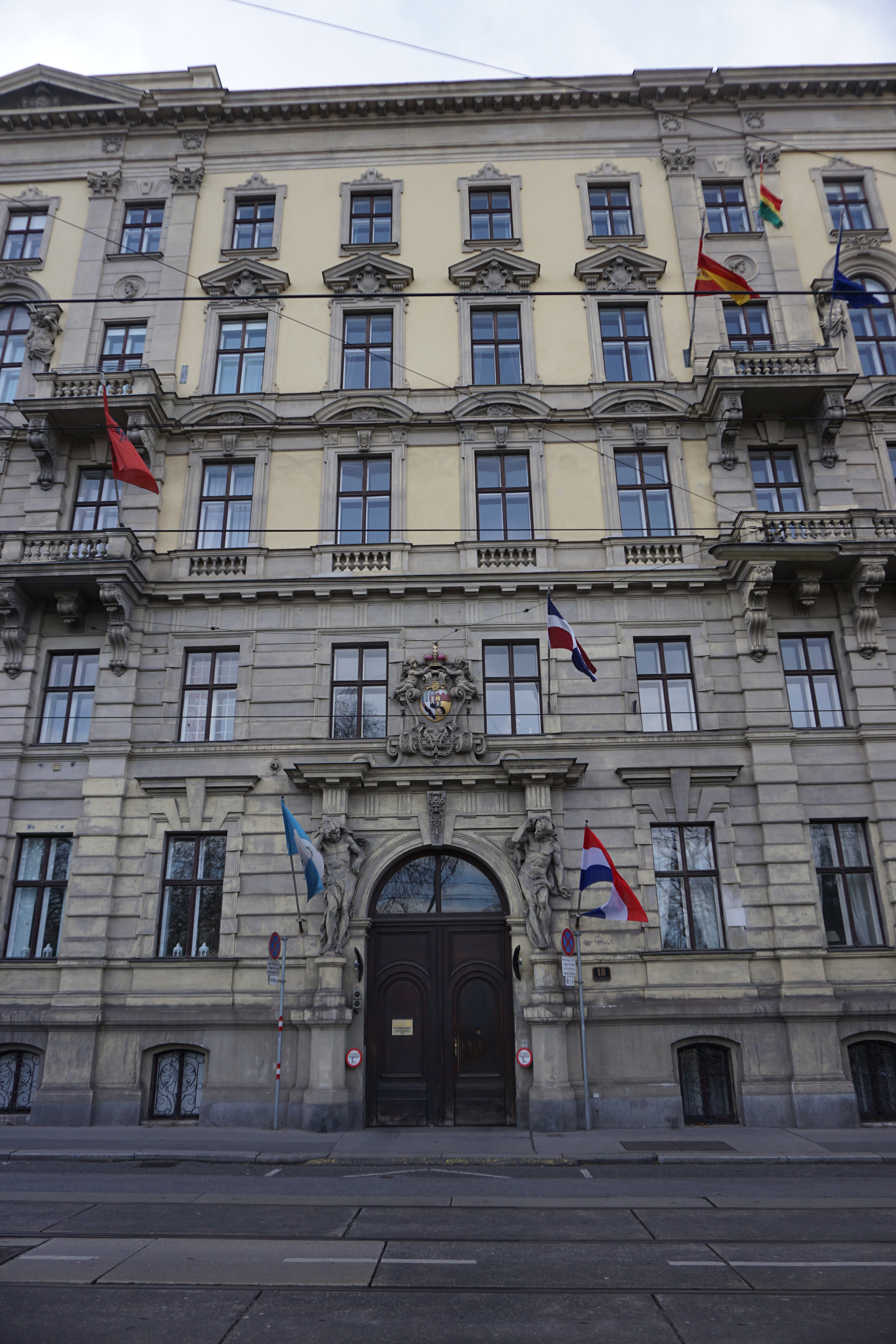
Embassy of Albania in Vienna

== See also ==
- Foreign relations of Albania
- Foreign relations of Austria
- Austria-NATO relations
- Accession of Albania to the EU
- NATO-EU relations
- Albanians in Austria
