= Galip =

Galip is the Turkish spelling of the Arabic masculine given name Ghalib (Arabic: غالب ghālib) which generally means "to overcome, to defeat", also meaning "successor, victor".

It may refer to:

== People ==
- Galip Balkar (1936–1983), Turkish diplomat assassinated by Armenian militants
- Galip Cav (1912–?), Turkish cyclist and participant in the 1928 Summer Olympics
- Galip Ramadhi (born 1950), Albanian politician
- Mehmed Said Galip Pasha (1764–1829), Ottoman grand vizier
- Reşit Galip (1893–1934), Turkish politician

== See also ==
- Galip nut
- Galatasaray Beyoğlu Hasnun Galip Club Administrative Center
