= Lefter =

Lefter is a masculine given name. People named Lefter include:

- Lefter Goga (1921–1997), Albanian politician
- Lefter Koka (born 1964), Albanian politician
- Lefter Küçükandonyadis (1924–2012), Turkish footballer
- Lefter Maliqi, Albanian politician
- Lefter Millo (1966–1997), Albanian footballer
- Lefter Talo, Albanian resistance leader, revolutionary, hero of World War II and teacher
