= Përnaska =

Përnaska is an Albanian surname. Notable people with the surname include:

- Ilir Përnaska (born 1951), Albanian football player
- Lajla Përnaska (born 1961), Albanian politician
