= Maliqi =

Maliqi is an Albanian surname. Notable people with the surname include:

- Adem Maliqi (born 1997), Kosovar footballer
- Behar Maliqi (born 1986), Kosovar footballer
- Edis Maliqi (born 1995), Macedonian footballer
- Jonida Maliqi (born 1983), Albanian singer
- Lefter Maliqi (born 1972), Albanian politician
- Sara Maliqi (born 1995), Albanian association football player
- Shkelzen Maliqi (born 1947), Albanian philosopher
- Sokol Maliqi (born 1981), Swiss footballer

== See also ==
- Maliq, town and municipality in Korçë County, Albania
