= Jorida Tabaku =

Albanian politician (born 1979)

- Jorida Tabaku

Member of the Albanian Parliament
- Incumbent
- Assumed office 10 September 2021
- Constituency: Tirana County
- In office 9 September 2013 – 19 February 2019
- Constituency: Tirana County

Deputy Mayor of Tirana
- In office 2011–2013
- Preceded by: Albana Dhimitri
- Succeeded by: Enno Bozdo

Deputy Minister of European Integration
- In office 2009–2011
- Preceded by: Zef Bushati
- Succeeded by: Grida Duma

Chair of the European Affair Committee
- In office 2021–2025
- Preceded by: Rudina Hajdari
- Succeeded by: Igli Hasani

Chair of the National Council of the European Integration
- Incumbent
- Assumed office 2021
- Preceded by: Rudina Hajdari

Chair of the Human Right and Media Information
- Incumbent
- Assumed office 2025

Personal details
- Born: Jorida Hasan Tabaku; 1 July 1979 (age 47) Tirana, Albania
- Party: Democratic Party
- Education: University of Tirana (BA); University of Durham (MA)
- Website: joridatabaku.al

Jorida Hasan Tabaku (born 1 July 1979) is an Albanian politician. She has been a member of the Democratic Party of Albania since 2013. She is also a Deputy Mayor of Tirana from 2011 to 2015.

== Early life and education ==
Tabaku graduated with a degree in Business Administration from the University of Tirana in 2002. She completed a Master of Arts degree at Durham University Business School in 2005. In 2009 she received a doctorate in Economics from the University of Tirana.

== Career ==
From 2002, Tabaku lectured in the Management Department at the University of Tirana. Until 2004 she was also involved in a USAID project for designing and managing the construction of a new library at the University of Tirana.

In 2006, she was hired as a local consultant in the DFID project on Strengthening Public Expenditure Management in Albania, implemented by REPIM.

=== Political career ===
In 2009, Tabaku was appointed Deputy Minister of European Integration, a position she held until mid-2011.

In 2011, Tabaku chaired the list of the Municipal Advisors of Tirana for the Democratic Party of Albania (DP), and in July 2011 she was appointed Deputy Mayor of Tirana.

In the 2013 Albanian parliamentary election, Tabaku was elected a Member of the Parliament of Albania for Tirana, representing the DP. She is the Deputy Chair of the DP and Chair of the European Affairs Committee in the Albanian Parliament, and also a member of the Economic and Finance Committee.

On May 14, 2025, it was made known that Tabaku won her mandate as a member of parliament from the Democratic Party and will be in parliament. But after a considerable and large number of votes, she won her mandate as a politician against Ilir Alimehmeti.

== Political positions ==
Tabaku has been a vocal critic of the Albanian Law on Strategic Investments. She has argued that the legislation, originally intended as a temporary measure to attract foreign direct investment, has been repeatedly extended and utilized to facilitate the transfer of public assets to private entities without competitive processes. Tabaku contends that the law creates an uneven economic playing field and has raised concerns that it undermines constitutional property rights by allowing state intervention in private disputes to favor specific investors.

== Personal ==
In addition to her native Albanian, Tabaku also speaks English, Italian and German.
