= Xhepa =

Xhepa is an Albanian surname. Notable people with the surname include:

- Denni Xhepa (born 2003), alpine skier
- Margarita Xhepa (1932–2025), Albanian actress
- Ndriçim Xhepa (born 1957), Albanian actor
- Selami Xhepa (fl. 2009), Albanian politician
