= Vasillaq =

- Gender: Male

Origin
- Region of origin: Albania, Kosovo

Vasillaq is an Albanian masculine given name and may refer to:

- Vasillaq Ngresi, Albanian politician
- Vasillaq Vangjeli (1948–2011), Albanian actor
- Vasillaq Zëri (1952–2019), Albanian footballer
