= Skuqi =

Skuqi is an Albanian surname. Notable people with the surname include:

- Luan Skuqi (born 1951), Albanian politician
