= Bakalli =

Bakalli is an Albanian surname. Notable people with the surname include:

- Adrian Bakalli (born 1976), Belgian footballer
- Engert Bakalli, Albanian footballer
- Franc Bakalli (born 1997), Albanian footballer
- Gilman Bakalli (1967–2016), Albanian professor, politician, writer and MP
- Hamdi Bakalli (1923–1991), Albanian footballer
- Mahmut Bakalli (1936–2006), Kosovar politician
