= Grida Duma =

Albanian politician (born 1977)

Member of the Albanian Parliament
- In office 11 September 2017 – 7 November 2022

Deputy Minister of European Integration
- In office October 2011 – 1 September 2013
- Preceded by: Jorida Tabaku
- Succeeded by: Eralda Çani

Personal details
- Born: 11 June 1977 (age 49) Durrës, Albania
- Party: Democratic Party
- Spouse: Ilir Shqina (m. 2000; div. 2022)
- Children: 1
- Education: University of Tirana; University of Nebraska–Lincoln

Grida Duma (born 11 June 1977) is an Albanian television presenter, former politician, lecturer and journalist. A member of the Democratic Party of Albania, she served as the Deputy Minister of European integration in the Berisha cabinet in the years 2011–2013. After leaving politics, she became the host of the Top Channel current affairs programme Top Story as of 2022.

== Education ==
Grida is graduated with distinction in Sociology from the Faculty of Social Sciences of the University of Tirana. She has successfully completed her post graduate studies in the Central European University in Hungary and the University of Nebraska–Lincoln in the United States. She received a MA in Business Administration from the University of Tirana and holds a Doctorate Degree in Economics.

She worked as a professor and lecturer for different Universities in Albania, including the University of Tirana where she was also head of the Department of Sociology in the Faculty of Social Sciences.

== Political career ==
She started her political career as the Deputy Minister of European integration during the years 2011–2013. On the local elections of 2015 it was rumored that she would candidate for Mayor in Tirana but later was announced her candidacy for the Municipality of Durrës.

Since 2014, after losing the elections she became the Secretary for Public Relations of the Democratic Party of Albania.

=== Member of the Parliament ===
In 2017, Duma was elected for the Democratic Party at the Albanian Parliament representing Tirana county.

In September she was elected as spokesperson of the parliamentary group of the Democratic Party.

== Television career ==
On November 7, 2022, Duma announced the end of her political career, resigning from her position as Member of Parliament. Shortly thereafter, it was announced that she would return to her journalistic career, by hosting a political talk show called Top Story by Grida Duma airing on Top Channel.

== Personal life ==
Duma was married to Albanian diplomat and lecturer Ilir Shqina for 22 years since 2000 until their divorce in 2022. They had a son. Ilir died on 6 June 2025.
