= Rajmond =

Rajmond is an Albanian and Hungarian masculine given name. It is a cognate of the French and English name Raymond. People bearing the name Rajmond include:

- Rajmond Breznik, Hungarian footballer
- Rajmond Debevec (born 1963), Slovenian sports shooter
- Rajmond Hoxha (born 19??), Albanian politician
- Rajmond Toricska (born 1993), Hungarian footballer
