= Ghalib (name) =

Ghalib (Arabic: غالب ghālib) is an Arabic masculine given name which generally means "to overcome, to defeat", also meaning "successor, victor". It may also be a surname and refer several notable people:

== Given name ==
- Ghālib ibn ʿAbd al-Raḥmān (900–981), Andalusian military commander
- Ghalib Bin Ali (1912–2009), last elected Imam of the Ibadi sect in Oman
- Ghalib Efendi, former Sharif of Hejaz
- Ghalib Shiraz Dhalla (born 1978), Los Angeles-based novelist
- Ghaleb Zu'bi (born 1943), Jordanian lawyer and politician

== Surname ==
- Amer Ghalib (born 1979), American politician
- Asadulla Al Galib (born 1998), Bangladeshi cricketer
- Muhammad Asadullah Al-Ghalib (born 1948), Bangladeshi Islamic scholar and academic
- Umar Arteh Ghalib (1930–2020), Somali politician and former prime minister of Somalia
- Sharif Ghalib (born 1961), Afghan politician
- Ghalib (1797–1869), also known as Mirza Asadullah Baig Khan, Urdu poet
- Sohel Hasan Galib (born 1978), Bangladeshi poet

== Epithet ==
- Al-Ghalib billah also known as Muhammad ibn Ahmad al-Qadir (992–1019), was the son of Al-Qadir (r. 991–1031) and elder brother of Al-Qa'im (r. 1031–1075). He was nominated heir in 1001.
- Al-Ghalib Billah (Arabic: الْغَالِبُ بِالله al-ghālibu billah; "The Victor by the Grace of Allah [God]") or simply Al-Ghalib (Arabic: الْغَالِب al-ghālib), the honorific epithet of founder and Sultan Muhammad I of Granada of the Nasrid Dynasty of Emirate of Granada
