= Top Story (Albanian TV program) =

Albanian talk show (since 2006)

- Genre: Talk show Interview; Televised debate
- Created by: Sokol Balla
- Presented by: Sokol Balla (2006–2017; 2022); Grida Duma (2022–present)
- Country of origin: Albania
- Original language: Albanian

Production
- Running time: 90 minutes

Original release
- Network: Top Channel
- Release: October 2006 – present

Top Story nga Grida Duma (English: Top Story by Grida Duma), or simply Top Story, is an Albanian political and current affairs talk show broadcast on Top Channel. Since November 2022 it has been hosted by former politician Grida Duma. The program covers political, social, cultural, and other current issues in Albania through reports, studio interviews, and debates.

== History ==
The show was created and initially hosted by journalist Sokol Balla, premiering in October 2006. It aired continuously until 31 December 2017, when Balla departed from Top Channel and moved to Vizion Plus, where he launched a new program titled Real Story.

After nearly five years, Top Story briefly returned on 1 March 2022 with Balla again as presenter, but the program ended on 10 October 2022 when he left the channel without prior announcement.

On 14 November 2022, the hosting duties were taken over by Grida Duma, who had recently stepped down from her political career. Her version of the show has been noted for adopting what commentators have described as a “Western-style” approach to political debate.

== See also ==
- Top Channel
