= Sokol Balla =

Albanian journalist, writer and talk show host (born 1973)

- Born: May 7, 1973 (age 53); Tirana, PR Albania
- Education: University of Tirana
- Occupations: Journalist, author, political analyst
- Television: Real Story
- Children: 3

Sokol Balla (Albanian pronunciation: [ˈsɔkɔl ˈbala]; born May 7, 1973) is an Albanian journalist, writer, television host and political analyst, best known as the host of the political talk show Real Story. Over the years, he has been affiliated with several major Albanian television networks, where he has hosted or contributed to a variety of political programs including Fahrenheit, Top Story, and Exclusive.

== Early life and education ==
Balla was born on May 7, 1973 in Tirana, Albania. He joined the University of Tirana, initially studying philosophy before switching to journalism, completing a four-year degree. His professional career in journalism began in 1992 at the foreign news department of RTSH, the Albanian public broadcaster.

== Career ==
Throughout his career, Balla has worked with numerous Albanian media outlets. He has been a contributor to print publications such as Gazeta Shqiptare and Koha Jonë, and has held executive and editorial positions in Albanian national televisions, including Vizion Plus, Top Channel, Report TV, News 24, and ABC News.

== Bibliography ==
Title	Year	Publisher
Antishqiptari – Ditari i çrregullt i muajve të nxehtë dimër 2003 - dimër 2004	2015	55
33	2010	UET Press
Fjala e lirë, sfidë europiane – Mbi lirinë e shprehjes kur kërkojmë eurointegrimin	2011	UET Press
Loja që ndryshoi Shqipërinë	2016	UET Press
Koli i Bardhës shkon në Afrikë	2024	UET Press

== Awards and honors ==
Balla has received several professional honors, including:

- Leadership of the Year (2017)
- Decoration Grand Master ("Mjeshtër i Madh") awarded by President Bajram Begaj in 2023
- Career Award ( Çmimi i Karrierës) from Koha Jonë newspaper in 2023
