= Gëzim Dibra =

Albanian politician

Member of the Albanian parliament
- In office 2009–2011
- Succeeded by: Ramiz Çobaj

Personal details
- Party: Democratic Party

Gëzim Dibra (born 8 November 1956) was a member of the Assembly of the Republic of Albania for the Democratic Party of Albania.

== Death ==
Gëzim died on 12 August 2011. He was replaced by Ramiz Çobaj.
