= Derviçan =

Derviçan Δερβιτσάνη
- Village
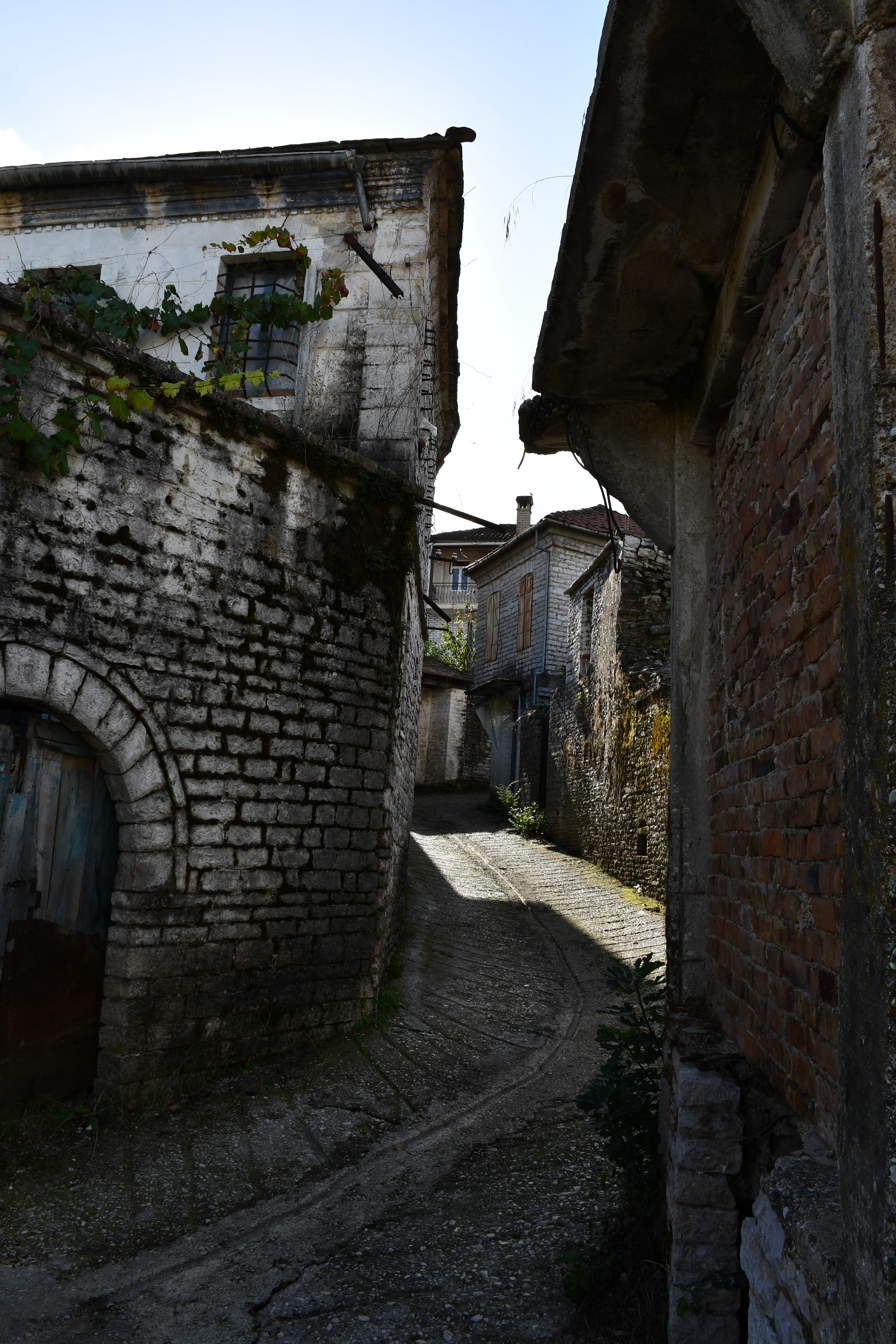
- Street with stone houses in Derviçan.

- Location within Albania
- Coordinates: 40°1′57″N 20°10′24″E
- Country: Albania
- County: Gjirokastër
- Municipality: Dropull
- Administrative unit: Dropull i Poshtëm
- Time zone: UTC+1 (CET)
  - Summer (DST): UTC+2 (CEST)

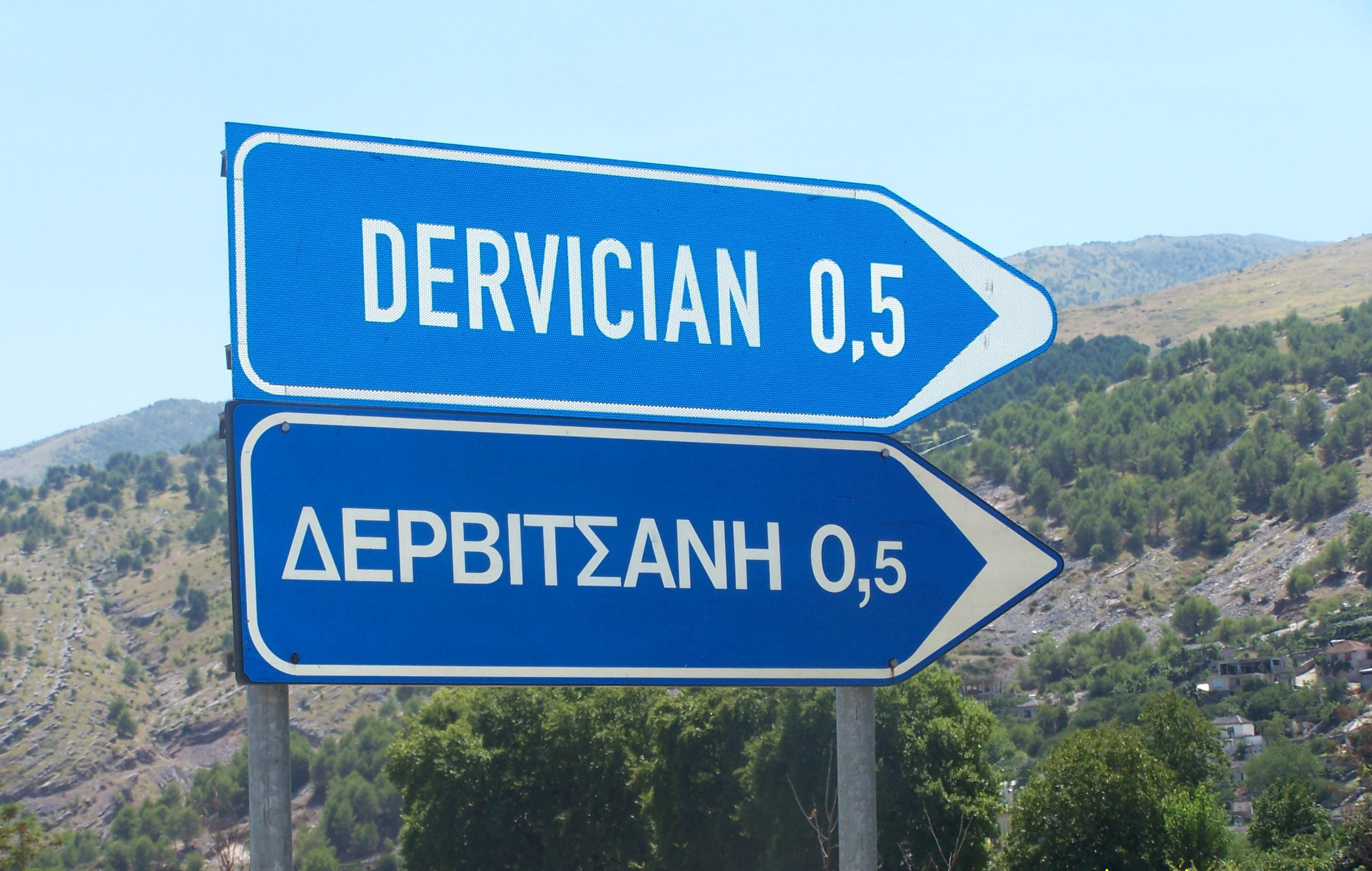
Bilingual road sign pointing to Derviçan

Derviçan (Albanian definite form: Derviçani; Greek: Δερβιτσάνη, romanized: Dervitsani, also known as Derviçian) is a settlement in the former Dropull i Poshtëm municipality, Gjirokastër County, southern Albania. At the 2015 local government reform, it became part of the municipality Dropull.

== Name ==
The toponym Derviçan is from a local name Дебрица, Debritsa from the Bulgarian дебър-ица, Debar-itsa and the suffix яне, yane where a Slavic sound change made ts and y become ch, and a Greek sound change made b into v. The placename is derived from the Old Slavic word дьбръ, dybera meaning 'pit, cave'.

== History ==
Derviçan is recorded in a document of 1084 during the reign of Byzantine Emperor Alexios I Komnenos.

In the 16th century, the church of Saint Anna (also known as Panagiotopoula) was built, while the following century saw the construction of an Orthodox monastery.

In 1940, during World War II, the town came under the control of the advancing Greek forces, who were welcomed by hundreds of local ethnic Greeks.

In 1991, the political organization Omonoia was founded in Derviçan, by representatives of the Greek national minority. In early 1993, in widespread unrest that occurred in ethnic Greek settlements, the mayor of Derviçan was arrested by the Albanian authorities and sentenced to six months in prison for raising the Greek flag on a Greek national day.

In 2023, the Albanian prime minister Edi Rama unveiled the statue of Konstantinos Mitsotakis, the first Greek prime minister who visited Albania after the fall of communism, as a symbol of coexistence and unity between Albanians and Greeks.

== Demographics ==
The settlement reached a population of 68 households in 1431/1432 and 317 in 1520. An estimate of 1583 counted 194 but this figure most likely excluded some households. In 1857 the population was estimated around 150 households.

In the 1520 Ottoman tax register, the Albanian anthroponyms Gjon and Gjin as well as others are found in the village of Derviçan, which appears in the same register with a fairly large population for the time, with a large influence by Greek culture. Characteristic Albanian anthroponyms include: Jani Gjini, Gjin Spato, Gjon Jorgji, Jorgo Gjoni, Nako Bard(h)i, Jorgo Babi, Mano Çuni, Jani Çuni, Kosta Lula, Mano Shpata, Lluka Prushi, Dhimo Prushi, Jani Dragoi and others. The anthroponymic material of the 1520 tax register points to the evident predominance of Greek anthroponyms in Derviçan.

The village is inhabited by Greeks, and the population was 1,818 in 1992.

== Notable people ==
- Lefter Millo (1966–1997), footballer
- Spiro Ksera, politician

== Bibliography ==
- Giakoumis, Konstantinos (2002). "The monasteries of Jorgucat and Vanishte in Dropull and of Spelaio in Lunxheri as monuments and institutions during the Ottoman period in Albania (16th-19th centuries)".
