= Real Story (Albanian TV program) =

Albanian political talk show (since 2019)

- Also known as: Real Story nga Sokol Balla
- Genre: Talk show
- Created by: Sokol Balla
- Presented by: Sokol Balla
- Country of origin: Albania
- Original language: Albanian

Production
- Running time: approx. 120 minutes

Original release
- Network: News 24
- Release: 16 September 2019
- Network: ABC News
- Release: 1 January 2020 – present

Real Story is an Albanian political talk show hosted by journalist Sokol Balla. The program airs on ABC News and focuses on political developments and current affairs in Albania.

== History ==
Following the conclusion of Top Story in late 2017 and its brief revival in 2022, Sokol Balla launched Real Story on News 24 on 16 September 2019. The program later moved to ABC News, where it continues to air.

== Format ==
The show typically airs four nights per week, Monday through Thursday at 20:00. Each episode features in-depth interviews and discussions on current political issues, with guest appearances from political figures and analysts.

== Notable guests ==
Over the years, Real Story has hosted many leading Albanian political figures, including:

- Edi Rama
- Ilir Meta
- Sali Berisha
- Lulzim Basha
- Monika Kryemadhi
- Erion Veliaj

The program has also featured international analysts, diplomats, and experts commenting on Albania’s political and social developments, among them former U.S. ambassador to Albania Yuri Kim, as well as other international representatives.

== See also ==
- Sokol Balla
