= Edmond Spaho =

Albanian politician

Edmond Spaho MP
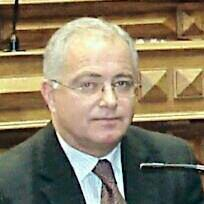

Member of the Albanian Parliament for Korca County, Korca
- Incumbent
- Assumed office September 9, 2021

Minister of Tourism
- In office April 6, 1993 – December 3, 1994
- Prime Minister: Aleksander Meksi
- Preceded by: Osman Shehu
- Succeeded by: Dashamir Shehi

Personal details
- Born: 14 November 1958 (age 67) Tirana
- Party: Democratic Party of Albania
- Spouse: Elga Spaho
- Children: 2
- Education: University of Tirana
- Occupation: Member of Parliament
- Profession: Economist

Edmond Spaho (born 14 November 1958 in Tirana) is an Albanian Democratic Party politician and the Member of Parliament (MP) for Korca since 25 April 2021.

== Early life and education ==
Edmond Spaho is born in Tirana. He studied for economy at the University of Tirana, where he graduated in 1982. In 1992, has completed studies on Financial Programming and Policy at the IMF Institute in Washington, D.C. During 1995-1996 has completed the graduate studies in Business Administration at the Bowling Green State University, Ohio, United States.

== Political career ==
Edmond Spaho has exercised several important positions in the public administration including Deputy General Director of the State Stock, Director of the Macroeconomics Department at the Ministry of Economy.

In May 1992 he was appointed Deputy Minister of The Ministry of Tourism and on 6 April 1993 was appointed as Minister of Tourism, in Aleksander Meksi Government. He left the office on 3 December 1994.

During the period of 1998-2005 he was the Director of Albanian National Training and Technical Assistance Resource Center established by USAID.

He has also been chairman of Albanian Football Federation from 1994 to 1996.

Edmond Spaho is member of the Democratic Party of Albania since its foundation. Since 2001, has also been elected Secretary for the Economy, member of the National Council, and member of the Presidency of the Democratic Party.

Edmond Spaho was elected as a member of the Parliament of Albania in the 2005 general election as a member of the Democratic Party for the Korçë constituency. During the 2005-2009 and 2009-2013 legislatures, has been the Chairman of Standing Committee on Economy and Finance.

He was re-elected as MP in the same electoral zone, thus becoming one of the 56 MPs of the Democratic Party's parliamentary group for the years 2009–2013. He also was re-elected as Member of Parliament in the 2013 elections, where his party lost the elections, thus becoming MP of opposition for next four years. During the legislature 2013–2017 years Mr. Spaho was appointed as Deputy Speaker of the Parliament of Albania.

In the 2017 general election, Edmond Spaho was elected Member of Parliament in the Elbasan District, thus becoming the Member of Albanian parliament for the fourth consecutive time. He is Deputy Chairman of the Democratic Party since 2013 and incumbent leader of the Democratic Party Parliamentary Group since 9 September 2017.

During the 2021 general election, Edmond Spaho was elected for the fifth time as Member of the Albanian Parliament in Korca District.

== See also ==
- List of MPs of Parliament of Albania
