= Parid Teferiçi =

Albanian author and curator (born 1972)

- Born: February 15, 1972 (age 54); Kavajë, Tirana County, Albania
- Occupations: Author, curator

Parid Teferiçi (born 15 February 1972, in Kavajë) is an Albanian author and curator. From 1999–2001, he served as head archivist at the library of the Don Calabria Institute in Rome, and in 2001 became curator of the visual arts section of the Cini Cultural Institute in Ferrara. He has exhibited his painting in Italy. In 2005, he returned to Albania to take part in the parliamentary elections as a candidate for the Republican Party in his native Kavaja.

Teferiçi has published two slender volumes of poetry: Bërë me largësi (Made from a Distance), Tirana 1996, and Meqenëse sytë (Since the Eyes), Tirana 2003. His discriminating works have proven him to be among Albania's major contemporary poets.
