= Ferdinand Xhaferaj =

Albanian politician

Member of the Albanian parliament
- In office 1992–2011

Minister of Tourism, Cultural Affairs, Youth and Sports
- In office 2009–2011

Personal details
- Born: Ferdinand Mynyr Xhaferaj Durrës, Albania
- Party: Democratic Party

Ferdinand Xhaferaj is an Albanian politician and member of the Democratic Party of Albania. He served as Minister of Tourism, Cultural Affairs, Youth and Sports starting in 2009. In 2011, he resigned as minister and MP to run for mayor of Durrës.
