= Šefka Hodžić =

Bosnian murderer (born 1943)

Šefka Hodžić (born 1943; fate unknown) was a Bosnian woman convicted of the 1969 murder of her pregnant friend Alija Hasanović. The brutality of the murder has earned Hodžić the title of one of the most "monstrous" women in Bosnian history.

== Background ==
For months before the killing, since childless Hodžić had learned of her friends pregnancy, she began stuffing her shirts to appear pregnant, indicating premeditation.

== The murder ==
The murder occurred on 6 October 1969 in the village Jusići on a mountain near Zvornik, Bosnia and Herzegovina. On the outskirts, Šefka talked to the victim Alija Hasanović, who was in the 9th month of pregnancy. Alija went to the neighboring village of Andjelic, where she was married. Since she did not arrive home, the locals thought that pregnancy problems had caught up to her somewhere along the way, and then they set off in search. In the meantime, the Šefka announced that she had given birth and had a baby girl. The locals quickly discovered Alija's body near the stream, near the village of Kamenjača. Her stomach was dissected, and the child was taken out of it and taken away.

After they found the body, the police did not know where to start. Alija was shot in the back three times with a gun, and then her child was taken out of her womb. The right path was pointed out by a pathologist who put forward the thesis that the crime was committed by a barren woman eager for a child. An examination of all women in the village who gave birth on the day of the murder was immediately requested. Among them was Šefka, who announced the "birth" of the girl around 7 p.m., two hours after Alija's death. The gynecological examination established that Šefka did not give birth and that she acted out her entire pregnancy.

== Trial ==
People from Bosnia and Herzegovina showed indignation towards Šefka. Threats, contempt and slander were addressed to her future defender. Her husband, Nedžib, her mother, brothers and sisters left her, and the Hodžić family sold their property and moved from the village of Jusić to Kalesija near Tuzla. Šefka claimed that others only brought her a child, that she had no idea when and in what way it was taken, and that it was only when the baby died early the next morning that she learned that Alija had been killed the day before and that her stomach was opened.

On 25 May 1970 Hodžić was sentenced to death by firing squad by the District Court in Tuzla, but the sentence was reduced to 20 years in prison in November 1970. She was granted early released in 1983. Though never officially confirmed, it is believed that she changed her name upon release from prison, remarried and even had a child. She allegedly lived for a while in neighboring Serbia with her second husband.
