= Klajda Gjosha =

Albanian politician (born 1983)

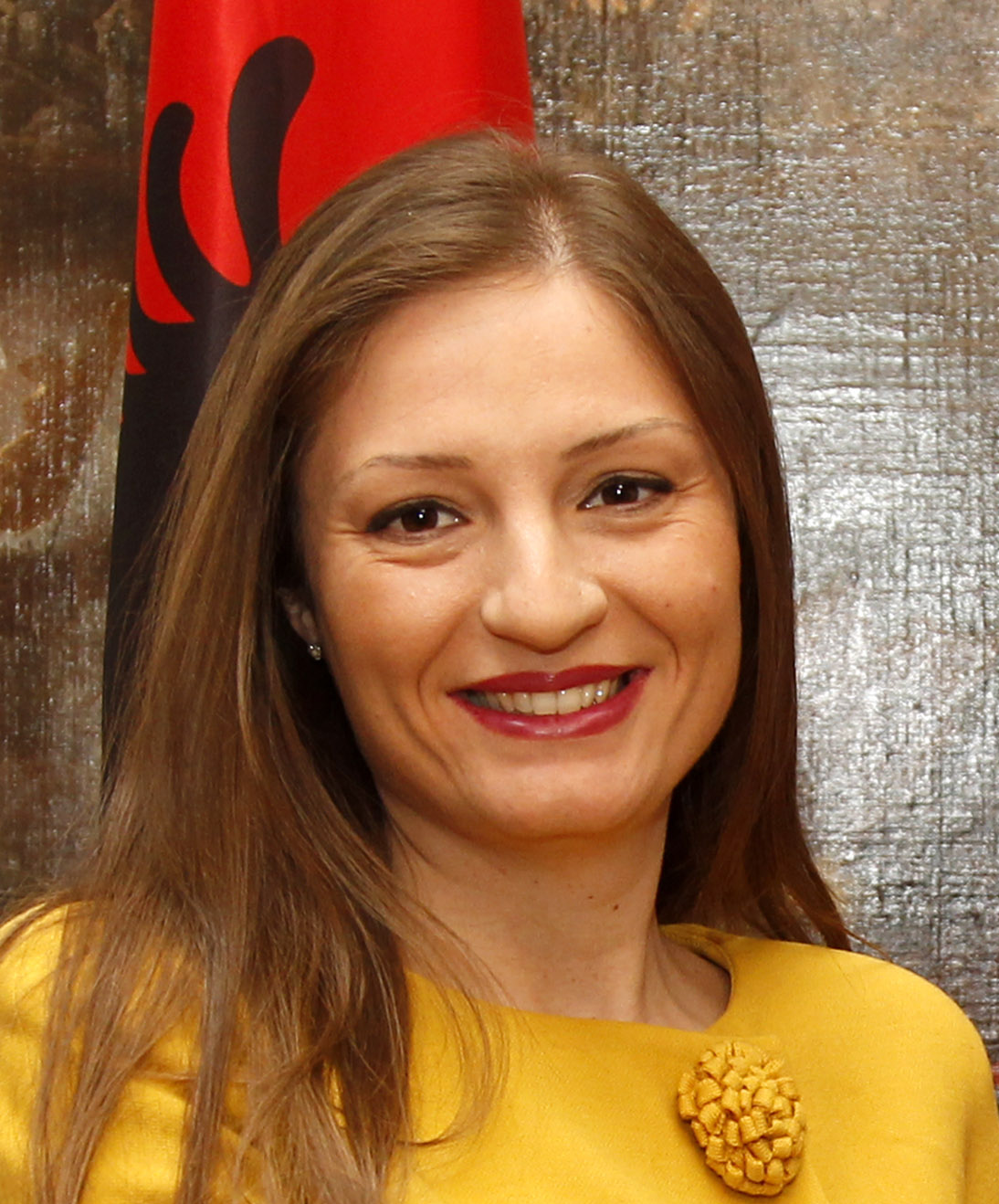
- Image of Klajda Gjosha

Minister of European Integration
- In office 15 September 2013 – 13 September 2017
- Prime Minister: Edi Rama
- Preceded by: Majlinda Bregu
- Succeeded by: Ditmir Bushati

Personal details
- Born: 28 July 1983 (age 43) Tirana, Albania
- Party: LSI
- Education: University of Reading

Klajda Gjosha (born 28 July 1983 in Tirana, Albania) is an Albanian politician, who served as Minister of European Integration from 15 September 2013 to 11 September 2017 in the Edi Rama first government.

== Early life and education ==
Gjosha attended secondary education at the advanced level at Strode College, in the United Kingdom, and went on to obtain a bachelor's degree in Political Sciences and International Relations (2005) and a master's degree in European Studies (2006) from the University of Reading.

== Career ==
From 2006 to 2012 Gjosha worked as director at the Tirana Municipality, Director of Agenda Consulting and Research Company, Director of Marketing-Promotion in the National Tourism Agency, Assistant Representative for WAZ Albania at WAZ Medien Gruppe, and social worker at European Care LTD Company.

In 2012 she was nominated as Deputy Chair of the Socialist Movement for Integration (LSI) party, and Member of the party Chairmanship, Chair of the SMI Women Forum

In 2012-2013 Gjosha served for three months as Deputy Minister of Labour, Social Affairs and Equal Opportunities in the Sali Berisha government, until the departure of LSI from the government coalition.

From 2013 to 2017, she served as Minister of European Integration of the Republic of Albania, and Deputy Chair of the Socialist Movement for Integration (LSI)

Political offices
Preceded by Majlinda Bregu	Minister of European Integration; 2013–present	Incumbent
