= Sybi Hida =

Albanian politician

Member of the Albanian parliament
- Incumbent
- Assumed office 2009

Personal details
- Party: Democratic Party

Sybi Hida (Gramsh, 17 April 1975) is an Albanian economist and fiscal specialist, with a career in government, politics and international institutions. Currently a senior economist with the International Monetary Fund, between 2009 and 2013, he was a member of the Assembly of the Republic of Albania for the Democratic Party of Albania.

Prior to his stint in parliament, he worked in the Ministry of Finance of Albania as a top expert in macroeconomic and fiscal policies.
