= Engjëll Cara =

Albanian politician

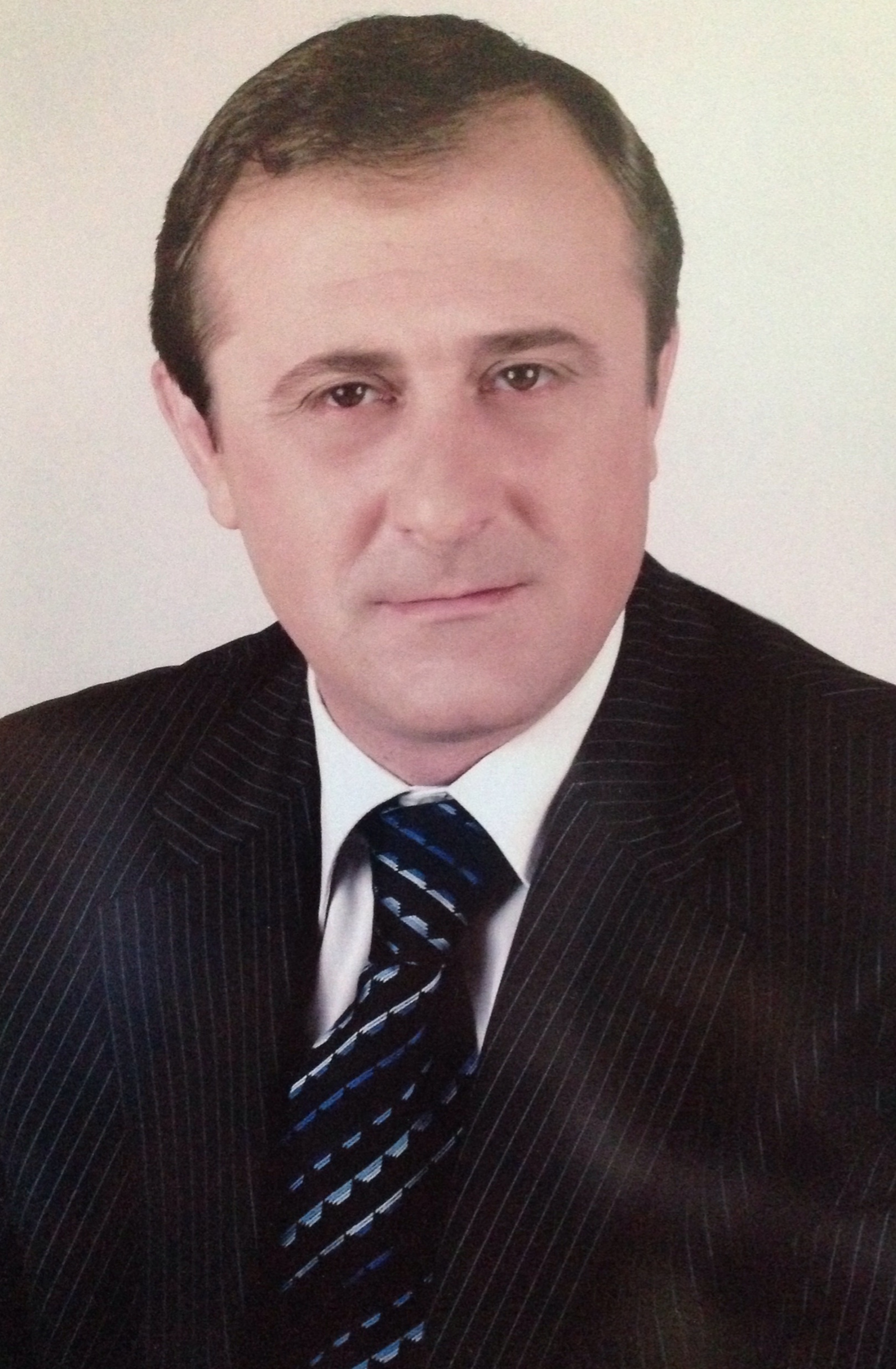
- Engjëll Cara

Member of the Albanian parliament
- In office 2005–2009

Personal details
- Party: Democratic Party

Engjëll Cara (born 20 July 1965 in Kavajë) is a politician and former member of the Assembly of the Republic of Albania for the Democratic Party. He studied veterinary medicine and graduated from Tirana's University of Agriculture in 1987. Cara began his career as a politician in 2001 when he won the elections for the leader of DP in Kavajë. He carried this post for eight years. In 2005, he was chosen Deputy in the Parliament of Albania. Engjëll Cara was elected for a second time as Democratic Party leader of the Kavajë branch on 28 June 2014, defeating opponent Isa Sakja. He is married and has two daughters.

== Career ==
- 1991- Member of the Democratic Party
- 1998-2001- Member of the Praesidium of Branch PD, Kavaja
- 1998-2009-Member of the National Council of DPA
- 2001-2009-Chairman of the PD Branch, Kavaja
- 2005-2009-Deputy in the Albanian Parliament of DPA
- 2014-2016 Chairman of the PD Branch, Kavaja
