= Lefter Millo =

Albanian footballer (1966–1997)

Personal information
- Date of birth: 2 August 1966
- Place of birth: Derviçan, Albania
- Date of death: 8 March 1997 (aged 30)
- Place of death: Giannouli, Greece
- Height: 1.72 m (5 ft 7 1/2 in)
- Position: Midfielder

Senior career*
Years	Team	Apps	(Gls)
1984–1986	Luftëtari	46	(2)
1986–1990	Partizani Tirana	147	(9)
1991–1996	AEL	103	(9)
1996–1997	Iraklis	10	(2)
Total		306	(22)

International career
1988–1996	Albania	20	(0)
- * Club domestic league appearances and goals

Lefter Millo (Greek: Λευτέρης Μίλος; 2 August 1966 in Derviçan, Albania – 8 March 1997 in Giannouli, Greece) was an Albanian football midfielder, who was part of the Greek minority in Albania.

== Club career ==
He made his senior debut for Luftëtari on 19 February 1984 against Skënderbeu and played for Partizani Tirana from 1986 to 1990. He was one in the first wave of Albanian footballers to leave the country for Greece following the fall of communism when he joined AEL in 1991. He also played for Iraklis.

== International career ==
He made his debut for Albania in an August 1988 friendly match at home against Cuba and earned a total of 20 caps, scoring no goals. His final international was an October 1996 FIFA World Cup qualification match against Portugal.

== International statistics ==
Appearances and goals by national team and year
National team	Year	Apps	Goals
Albania	1988	4	0
Albania	1989	4	0
Albania	1990	2	0
Albania	1991	2	0
Albania	1992	3	0
Albania	1993	2	0
Albania	1994	1	0
Albania	1996	2	0
Total		20	0

== Personal life ==
=== Death ===
He was killed in a car accident in Giannouli, near Larissa in 1997, when he was only 30 years old. 13 Years later, a statue of him would be placed in his native village with an official ceremony.

== Honours ==
- Albanian Superliga: 1

1987
