= Arianit Hoxha =

Macedonian politician

Arianit Hoxha is an Albanian politician from North Macedonia, Minister of Agriculture, Fisheries and Waters since 30 August 2020. He is part of the Besa Movement.

== Biography ==
He was born on 18 October 1986 in Resen. From November 2003 to April 2004, he was a project coordinator for the Organization for Security and Co-operation in Europe (OSCE). From October 2005 to September 2006, he was a member of the European Youth Parliament. In 2008, he graduated from the Faculty of Business Administration of the South East European University in Tetovo . In 2009, he founded a private company in the field of production and trade and became its manager. On 30 August 2020, he was elected Minister of Agriculture, Forestry and Water Management.
