= Sohel Hasan Galib =

Sohel Hasan Galib (Bengali: সোহেল হাসান গালিব; born November 15, 1978) is a Bangladeshi poet, essayist, academic and cultural activist. He is also an associate professor of Bengali language and literature and the editor of the literary magazine Porospor. A campion of cultural pluralism, Galib has organised an interreligious dialogue after the July Revolution in 2024.

== Controversy ==
His work has sparked significant controversy, particularly following his arrest in February 2025 over allegations of "hurting religious sentiments" through a poem in his free writing collection titled Amar Khutbaguli. His arrest prompted widespread protests from writers and activists, who argue it reflects growing state curbs on free expression amid stricter blasphemy laws. Pen Bangladesh condemned the arrest of the poet, saying that "opinions and ideas can only be countered by opinions and ideas, and not by stifling thought."

== Works ==
=== Poetry collections ===
- Choushatti Danar Uddayan (Flight of Sixty-Four Wings, 2007)
- Dwaipayan Bedanar Theke (From Island-born Agony, 2009)
- Raktomemorandum (Blood Memorandum, 2011)
- Ananga Ruper Deshe (In the Land of Formless Beauty, 2014)
- Timire Tarana (Melody in the Gloom, 2017)
- Phun (The Blow, 2020)
- Choushotti Pakhuri (Sixty Four Petals, 2022)
- Dorjay Ivylota (Ivy at the Door, 2023)
- Paye Bindheche Hasanta (A Halant Pierced My Foot, 2026)

=== Essay collections ===
- Bad-maghrib: Bhasha-Rajnitir Gopon Path (After Maghrib: The Secret Lesson of Language Politics, 2018)

=== Free Writing ===
- Amar Khutbaguli (My Sermons, 2024)

=== Edited anthology ===
- Shunyer Kabita (Selected Poems of 2000s, 2008)

=== Interview book ===
- Kahankatha (Selected Interviews of Selim Al Deen, 2008)
