= Gjok Uldedaj =

Albanian politician

Gjoke Uldedaj

Professor, Economic Faculty, UBT: Financial Control - Revision; International Marketing; Basis of Marketing; Prices and Trade of Production.
- In office 1986–2007

Assembly of the Republic of Albania, Member of the Albanian Parliament
- In office 2009–2013

President of the Center for Business and Parliamentary Dialog www.cbpd.al.
- Incumbent
- Assumed office 2011

Personal details
- Born: 3 March 1959 (age 67) Shkodra, Albania
- Party: Democratic Party

Gjok Uldedaj is a member of the Assembly of the Republic of Albania for the Democratic Party of Albania.
