= Majlinda Bregu =

Albanian politician

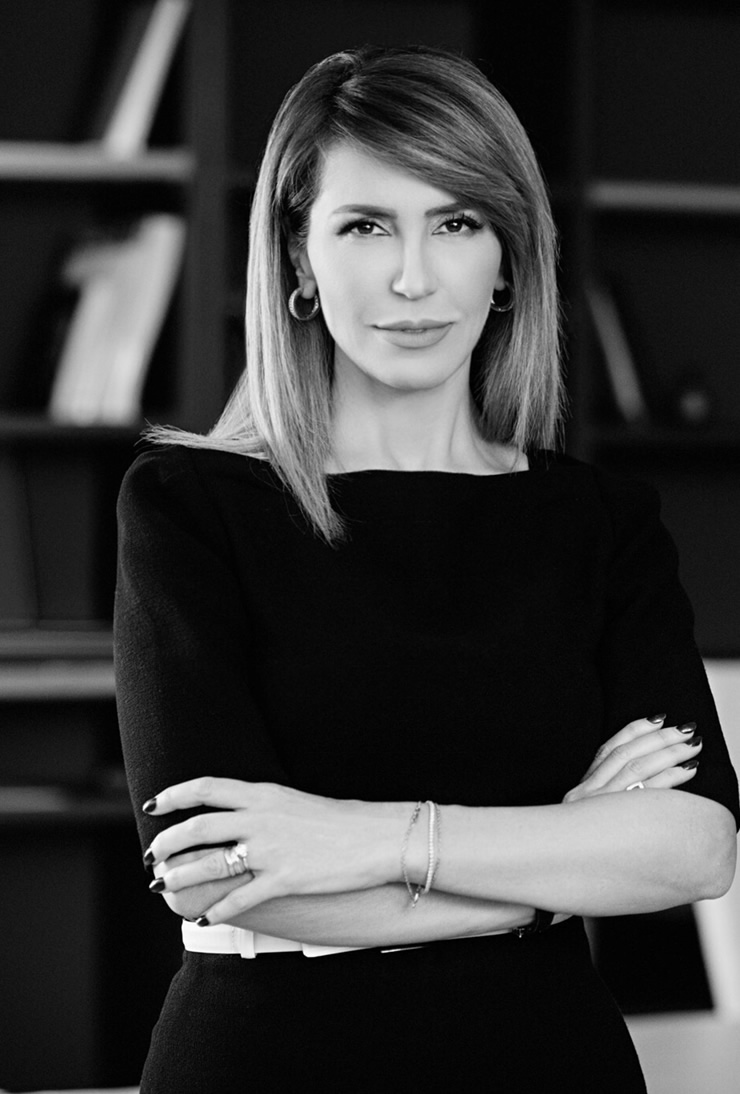
Majlinda Bregu

Commissioner at the Pan-European Commission on Climate and Health (PECCH)
- Incumbent
- Assumed office 19 May 2025

Secretary General of the Regional Cooperation Council
- In office January 2019 – December 2024
- Preceded by: Goran Svilanović
- Succeeded by: Amer Kapetanovic

Member of Parliament
- In office September 2005 – September 2017
- Prime Minister: Sali Berisha; Edi Rama

Minister of European Integration
- In office March 2007 – September 2013
- Prime Minister: Sali Berisha
- Preceded by: Arenca Trashani
- Succeeded by: Klajda Gjosha

Chairperson of the Committee for European Integration
- In office September 2013 – September 2017
- Prime Minister: Edi Rama
- Preceded by: Ditmir Bushati

Personal details
- Born: 19 May 1974 (age 52)
- Party: Democratic Party
- Spouse: Namik Ajazi
- Children: 2
- Education: University of Tirana; Urbino University, Italy

Majlinda Bregu (born 19 May 1974) is an Albanian politician and diplomat. She served as Minister of European Integration and Government Spokeswoman from 2007 to 2013 in the Berisha cabinet. A member of the Albanian Parliament from 2005 until 2017 representing Tirana County. She served as the Secretary-General of the Regional Cooperation Council between January 2019 and December 2024. In May 2025, she was appointed Commissioner at the WHO Pan-European Commission on Climate and Health (PECCH).

== Education ==
Bregu obtained a bachelor's degree in Social Sciences at the University of Tirana in 1996. The following year she was a visiting student at Montreal (Canada), Oslo (Norway) and Frankfurt am Oder (Germany).

She held a master's degree in social policy at the University of Tirana in 2003. She has a PhD from Urbino University in Italy in "Sociology of cultural phenomena and normative processes".

== Career ==
From 1996 and 2007 she worked as Full-Time Lecturer at the Social Sciences Faculty in the University of Tirana.

During the student years, she began her TV media experience, first as translator, then anchorperson and Journalist at the National Albanian Television. In 2004 she got appointed as the coordinator of Social Policies at the Political Orientation Committee of the Democratic Party. Then she became a Member of the National Council of the Party in April 2004. During the general election of 2005, she was declared as a candidate for parliament, representing Tirana.

=== Legislative proposals ===
Personal key legislative initiatives on EUI and Human Rights protection (7 enacted legal acts).

In January 2014, in the Law Commission, Bregu proposes amendments to the (Albanian) Civil Code, which would force the administrators of online media, websites and social networks to censor the comments of visitors on the ground of being offensive to "the dignity, personality and image of a woman".

=== Publications ===
"Europe, Back & Forth", 2014;

"Monitoring of Media on Domestic Violence, co-author 2003, -2004;

"Manual for judges & prosecutors dealing with Gender Based Violence";

"Children trafficking in Albania", Co-author 2005;

"Research methods in Social Sciences", co-author, 2003.
