= Lajla Përnaska =

Albanian politician

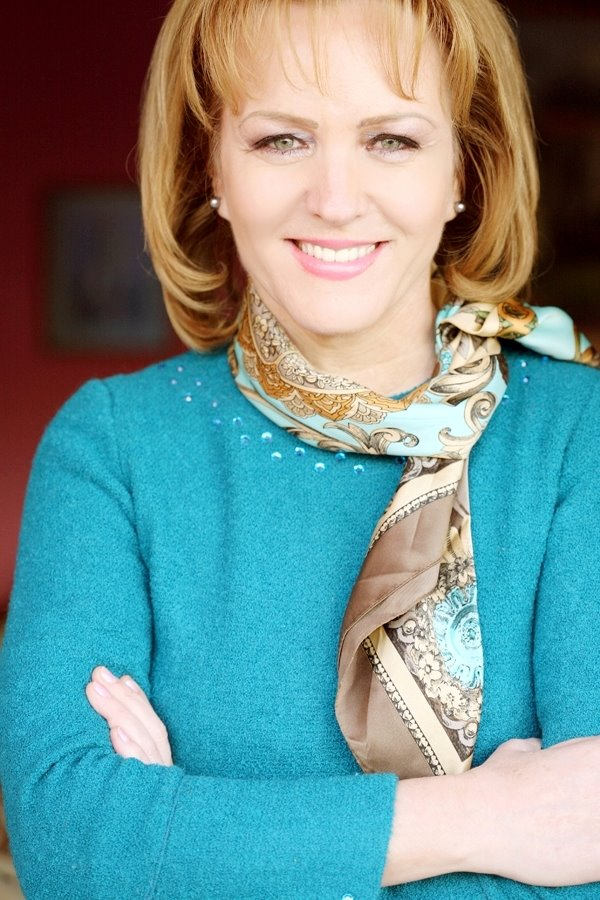

Member of the Albanian parliament
- In office 2005–2013

Personal details
- Party: Democratic Party

Lajla Përnaska was a member of the Assembly of the Republic of Albania for the Democratic Party of Albania during the year 2005 - 2013. She was elected in the Tiranë County.

She studied Pediatrics in the University of Tirana and later she specialised in Paris Descartes University and Henri Poincaré University in France. She was elected an MP on the general elections of 2005 from the Tiranë County. She was a member of the Committee on Foreign Policy and the Committee on Labour, Social Affairs and Health.
