= Paulin Sterkaj =

Albanian politician

Member of the Albanian parliament
- Incumbent
- Assumed office 2009

Personal details
- Political party: Socialist Party

Paulin Sterkaj is a member of the Assembly of the Republic of Albania for the Democratic Party of Albania. Sterkaj moved to the Socialist Party of Albania.
