= Ermelinda Meksi =

Albanian politician

Minister of European Integration
- In office December 2003 – September 2005
- President: Alfred Moisiu
- Prime Minister: Fatos Nano
- Preceded by: inaugurational holder
- Succeeded by: Arenca Trashani

Deputy Prime Minister
- In office June 2003 – December 2003
- President: Alfred Moisiu
- Prime Minister: Fatos Nano
- Preceded by: Namik Dokle
- Succeeded by: Namik Dokle

Minister of Economy
- In office 1998–2002
- President: Rexhep Meidani
- Prime Minister: Pandeli Majko; Ilir Meta

Personal details
- Born: 5 January 1957 (age 69)
- Party: Socialist Party
- Education: University of Tirana (Ph.D.)

Ermelinda Meksi is an Albanian politician, who held different positions in the Cabinet of Albania during the years 1997 to 2005. She is the first woman to be appointed as Deputy Prime Minister, the highest office held by a woman at the time in Albania.

== Biography ==
Meksi graduated from the University of Tirana in 1979. Later she obtained her PhD in economics there. She worked for many years as a professor at the Faculty of Economics.

In 1992 she was elected a Member of the Parliament of the Republic of Albania and held this position until November 2011. During the Socialist government she served as Minister of State for Foreign Assistance and Development in 1997 - 1998, than as Minister of Economy until 2002. In June 2003 she was appointed as Deputy Prime Minister in the new government formed by Fatos Nano and served at this position until December 2003. After that she was appointed as Minister of European Integration, a recently created Ministry, to help the process of European Integration.

Meksi served as Member of the Parliament until 2011, when the mandate was terminated after being elected a member of the Bank of Albania’s Supervisory Council by the Parliament.
