= Aurel Bylykbashi =

Albanian politician

Member of the Albanian parliament
- Incumbent
- Assumed office 2011

Personal details
- Party: Democratic Party

Aurel Bylykbashi is a member of the Assembly of the Republic of Albania for the Democratic Party of Albania. He joined the assembly after the resignation of 3 members at the 2011 Albanian local elections.
