= Mehmet Xheka =

Albanian politician

Member of the Albanian parliament
- In office 2005–2013

Personal details
- Party: Democratic Party

Mehmet Xheka is a former member of the Assembly of the Republic of Albania for the Democratic Party of Albania. He was the first and only Deputy of the Democratic Party of the city of Berat to win elections against the Socialist Party and Socialist Movement for Integration.
