= Gilman Bakalli =

Albanian politician

Member of the Albanian parliament
- In office 2005–2009

Personal details
- Born: 11 August 1967 Shkodër, Albania
- Died: 8 October 2016 (aged 49) Tirana, Albania
- Party: Democratic Party

Gilman Bakalli (Shkodër, 11 August 1967 – 8 October 2016) was an Albanian professor, politician, writer and a member of parliament from 2005 to 2009.

== Biography ==
Gilman Bakalli was born in Shkodër in the neighbourhood of "Rus i Vogël", being the son of Et'hem Bakalli and Nexhmije Shpuza. His father was imprisoned for 12 years because he took part in an anti-communist student movement during 1945–53.

He finished his early and high school education in Shkodër. During the transition he was in Tirana, studying for Geology Engeenering, but he later returned to Shkodra and finished his degree in German studies. In Austria he got a PhD in Philosophy and returned to the University of Shkodër "Luigj Gurakuqi" where he decided to pursue an academic career. After completing a doctorate in philosophy at the University of Graz, Gilman Bakalli took an active part in Albanian public life as teacher, researcher, and politician. He was cut short in his efforts of completing the promise of the book's title "The Alphabet of Transition" – 36 ideas and debates – so that the 27 essays in this book deconstruct its title, serve as an invitation to imagine the contents of the remaining nine titles, and embody the dynamics between constant flux and stagnation that the essays discuss. In 2005, he was a deputy of the Democratic Party in Shkodër and later on was elected as a member of parliament until 2009. In 2009, he was a candidate for the "Freedom Pole" coalition but he did not gain a seat. He strongly contested the results and accused the government of stealing votes.

He later worked as a lecturer in the European University of Tirana. He died on 8 October 2016 from acute leukemia.

== List of works ==
- Bakalli Gilman, Alfabeti i tranzicionit, European University of Tirana, UET-Press, Tiranë, 2017.

The Alphabet of Transition is a collection of original essays about modern-day Albania, in which Gilman Bakalli (1967–2016) comments on a range of topics, from market forces to the role of the intellectual, from his ecological concerns to the taboo topic of blood feud.

- Bakalli Gilman, Mendimi kritik i një qytetari, Botime Pegi, Tiranë, 2018.

== Translations ==
- Eagleton Terry, Hyrje në teorinë e letërsisë, përkth. shqip. Gilman Bakalli, Ed. Camaj-Pipa, Shkodër, 2005. (bot. origj. Eagleton Terry, Literary Theory: An introduction, Great Britain by Blackwell Publishers Ltd., London 1996).
- Popper Karl R., E gjithë jeta është zgjidhje problemesh, përkth. shqip. Gilman Bakalli, Camaj-Pipa, Shkodër 2002. (bot. origj. Popper Karl Raimund, Alles Leben ist Problemlösen: Über Erkenntnis, Geschichte und Politik, German edition, Piper 1995).
- Bocheński J. M., Ftesë për të filozofuar, përkth. shqip. Gilman Bakalli, Shkodra University Press – Prishtina University Press., Shtypshkronja “Shkodra”, Shkodër 2000. (bot. origj. Bocheński J. M., Wege zum philosophischen Denken: Einführung in die Grundbegriffe, Herder, Freiburg 1964).
