= Adrian Kollozi =

Albanian politician

Member of the Albanian parliament
- In office 2009–2011

Personal details
- Political party: Democratic Party

Adrian Kollozi is a member of the Assembly of the Republic of Albania for the Democratic Party of Albania. He resigned for 2011 Albanian local elections.
