= Arenca Trashani =

Albanian politician

Minister of European Integration
- In office September 2005 – March 2007
- Prime Minister: Sali Berisha
- Preceded by: Ermelinda Meksi
- Succeeded by: Majlinda Bregu

Member of the Albanian parliament
- In office 2005–2013

Personal details
- Party: Democratic Party

Arenca Trashani (born 20 June 1973 in Shkodër) has been a member of the Assembly of the Republic of Albania for the Democratic Party of Albania during 2005 – 2013 from the Shkodër County.

She served as Minister of European Integration during 2005 – 2007.
