= Hodžići (Kakanj) =

Village in Kakanj, Bosnia and Herzegovina

Hodžići Хоџићи
- Village
- Location within Bosnia and Herzegovina
- Coordinates: 44°14′55″N 18°05′31″E
- Country: Bosnia and Herzegovina
- Entity: Federation of Bosnia and Herzegovina
- Canton: Zenica-Doboj
- Municipality: Kakanj

Area
  - Total: 0.44 sq mi (1.14 km^{2})

Population (2013)
  - Total: 294
  - Density: 668/sq mi (258/km^{2})
- Time zone: UTC+1 (CET)
  - Summer (DST): UTC+2 (CEST)

Hodžići (Cyrillic: Хоџићи) is a village in the municipality of Kakanj, Bosnia and Herzegovina.

== Demographics ==
According to the 2013 census, its population was 294, all Bosniaks.
