= Galip Ramadhi =

Albanian politician

Member of the Albanian parliament
- In office 1993–1997

Personal details
- Political party: Democratic Party

Galip Ramadhi (born 23 December 1950, in Kavajë) is a politician and former member of the Assembly of the Republic of Albania for the Democratic Party. He served as deputy mayor of Kavajë from 2000 to 2003.
