= Hodžići, Vareš =

Village in Vareš, Bosnia and Herzegovina

Hodžići
- Village
- Location within Bosnia and Herzegovina
- Coordinates: 44.0657905°N 18.289177°E
- Country: Bosnia and Herzegovina
- Entity: Federation of Bosnia and Herzegovina
- Canton: Zenica-Doboj
- Municipality: Vareš

Area
  - Total: 0.35 sq mi (0.90 km^{2})

Population (2013)
  - Total: 181
  - Density: 520/sq mi (200/km^{2})
- Time zone: UTC+1 (CET)
  - Summer (DST): UTC+2 (CEST)

Hodžići is a village in the municipality of Vareš, Bosnia and Herzegovina.

== Demographics ==
According to the 2013 census, its population was 181.

Ethnicity in 2013
| Ethnicity | Number | Percentage |
|---|---|---|
| Bosniaks | 180 | 99.4% |
| other/undeclared | 1 | 0.6% |
| Total | 181 | 100% |
