= Luan Skuqi =

Albanian politician

Minister of Education and Sport
- In office 11 March 1997 – 24 July 1997

Member of the Albanian parliament
- In office 1992–1997
- In office 2003–2013

Personal details
- Born: September 25, 1951 (age 74) Kavajë, Albania
- Political party: Democratic Party

Luan Shyqyri Skuqi (born October 25, 1951, in Kavajë) is a politician and former member of the Assembly of the Republic of Albania for the Democratic Party. He served as Minister of Education and Sports in 1997. He was in term 135 days.
