= Ramiz Çobaj =

Albanian politician

Member of the Albanian parliament
- In office 2005–2013

Personal details
- Political party: Democratic Party

Ramiz Myftar Çobaj is a former Democratic Party of Albania member of the Assembly of the Republic of Albania who served in the Albanian Parliament from 2005 to 2009 and from 2011 to 2013. He also served as the head of Democratic Party of Shkodra from 2014 to 2018.
