= Lefter Maliqi =

Albanian politician

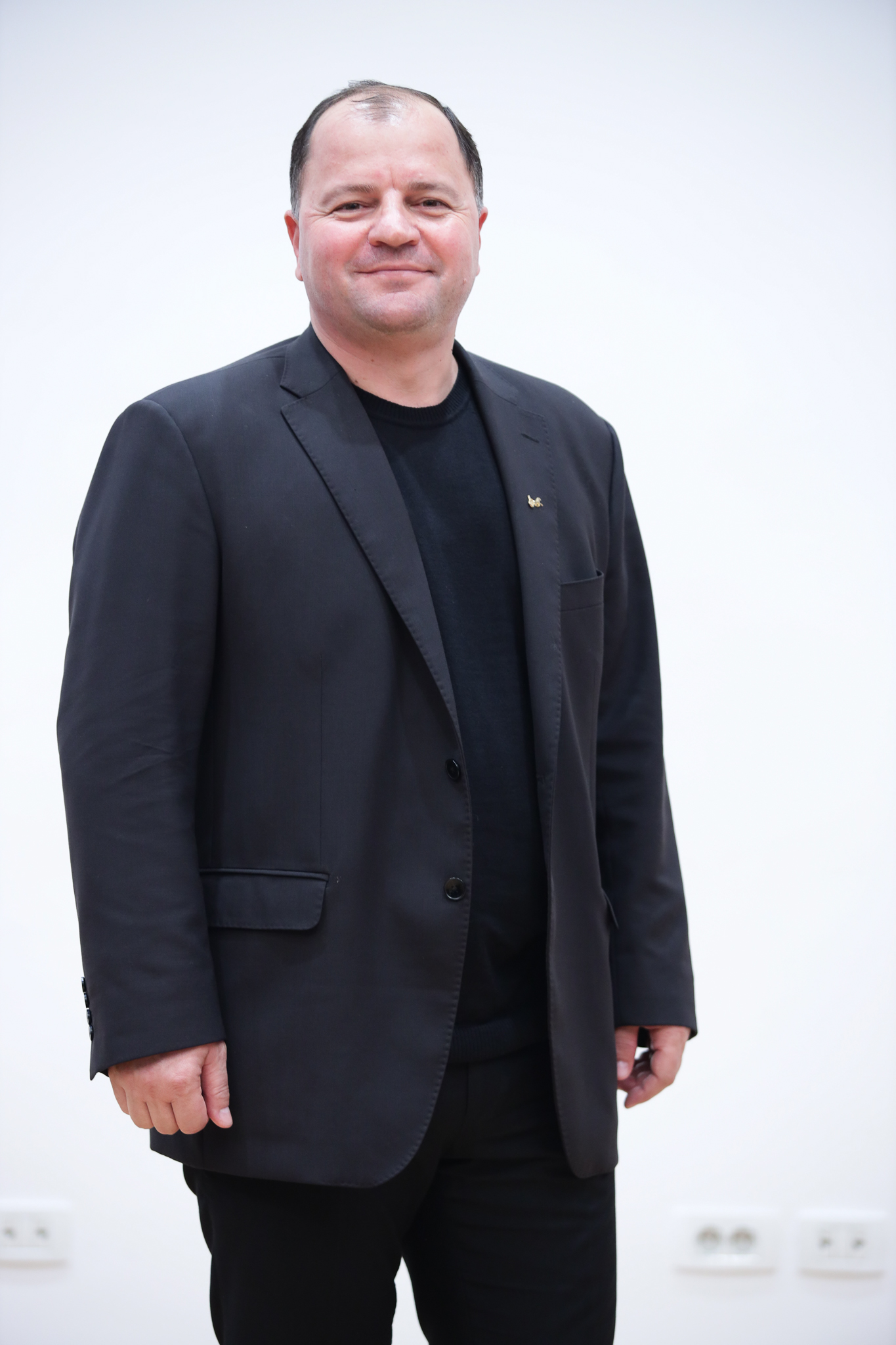
- Lefter in 2022

Ex-Member of the Albanian parliament
- In office 2009–2013

Personal details
- Political party: Democratic Party

Lefter Maliqi has been a member of the Assembly of the Republic of Albania for the Democratic Party of Albania for the period 2009 - 2013.
