= Ministry of European Integration (Albania) =

Government ministry of Albania

- Ministria e Integrimit Europian

Department overview
- Formed: 22 February 2002
- Dissolved: 13 September 2017
- Superseding Department: Ministry for Europe and Foreign Affairs
- Jurisdiction: Council of Ministers
- Status: Dissolved
- Headquarters: Tirana, Albania
- Minister responsible: Klajda Gjosha (LSI)

The Ministry of European Integration (Albanian: Ministria e Integrimit Europian) was a department of the Albanian Government, responsible for integration of Albania into the European Union. On 13 September 2017, the ministry was dissolved and merged with the Ministry of Foreign Affairs.

== History ==
On 2 October 1998, to meet the increased workload in the process of accession of Albania to the European Union and NATO, the Majko I Government appointed to the Council of Ministers Maqo Lakrori as Secretary of State for Euro-Atlantic Integration. Lakrori stayed in office until October 25, 1999.

With the return of Pandeli Majko as Prime Minister on 22 February 2002, the Ministry of Euro-Atlantic Integration was established. As minister was appointed Marko Bello.

Since the establishment of the institution, the Ministry of European Integration has been reorganized by merging with other ministries, thus making its name change several times. This list reflects the changes made since 2002:

- Ministry of Euro-Atlantic Integration (Ministria e Integrimit Euroatlantik) from 2002 to 2005
- Ministry of Integration (Ministria e Integrimit) from 2005 to 2013
- Ministry of European Integration (Ministria e Integrimit Europian) from 2013 to 2017 (dissolved)

The ministry was dissolved in September 2017. The department of integration was merged with the Ministry for Europe and Foreign Affairs.

== Officeholders (2002–2017) ==
No.	Name	Term in office
1	Marko Bello	22 February 2002	25 July 2002
2	Ermelinda Meksi	29 July 2002	1 September 2005
3	Arenca Trashani	7 September 2005	19 March 2007
4	Majlinda Bregu	20 March 2007	15 September 2013
5	Klajda Gjosha	15 September 2023	13 September 2017
