= Ministry of Justice (Albania) =

Government ministry of Albania

- Ministria e Drejtësisë

Department overview
- Formed: 4 December 1912; 113 years ago
- Jurisdiction: Government of Albania
- Headquarters: Zogu I Boulevard 17, 1016 Tirana, Albania
- Minister responsible: Toni Gogu
- Website: drejtesia.gov.al

The Ministry of Justice (Albanian: Ministria e Drejtësisë) is a department of the Albanian Government, responsible for the implementation of government justice policy, the Albanian legal system in the Constitution and general administrative law, civil law, procedural law and criminal law as well as matters relating to democratic issues, human rights, integration and minority issues and metropolitan affairs.

The current Minister of Justice is Toni Gogu since 6 March 2026.

== History ==
The Ministry of Justice was one of the original ministries created following the Independence of Albania in 1912.

From 1968 to 1989, the ministry was closed. It reopened as part of a series of reforms during the fall of communism in Albania.

=== Reorganization ===
Since the establishment of the institution, the Ministry of Justice has undergone several administrative changes to its organizational structure. When a new department was formed, it often merged with the ministry thus expanding its role, subsequently leading to the name of the ministry being changed. If that department later broke off as a separate ministry or was dissolved, the ministry reverted to its original name. (Note: The title "Substitutive" (gheg albanian: Zavëndësisht), often using the acronym "Zav.", references to the temporary exercise of duty by an official who was not formally appointed by the prime minister but occupied the interim role of the vacant minister. These officials are labeled in the list with an asterisk.) (Note: During the period of the Republic (1925–1928), the minister of justice served the de facto role of prime minister.)

- Ministry of Justice (1912–1914)
- Ministry of Justice and Cults (1914)
- Ministry of Justice (1914–1925)
- Ministry of Finances and Justice (1925)
- Ministry of Justice (1925–1939)
- Minister State Secretary of Justice (1939–1943)
- Ministry of Justice (1943–present)

The Ministry of Justice in Albania was abolished on September 13, 1966. This decision was made within the framework of the communist regime's campaign for the "revolutionization of the state apparatus" and the dissolution of judicial institutions. The decision was approved by the People's Assembly at the beginning of the 6th Legislature, leaving Albania without a Ministry of Justice until 1990. The administrative and organizational functions of the ministry were distributed among other state institutions, while judicial management was concentrated in the Supreme Court. On May 8, 1990, the People's Assembly approved the law establishing the Ministry of Justice, and Enver Halili took over the leadership of the institution.

== Subordinate institutions ==
- Bankruptcy Oversight Agency
- Property Handling Agency
- State Advocacy
- General Directorate of Prisons
- General Enforcement Directorate
- Institute of Forensic Medicine
- Albanian Adoption Committee
- Center of Official Publications
- Probation Service
- Central Office for the Registration of Immovable Property
- State Aid Justice Commission

== Officeholders (1912–present) ==
No.	Name	Term in office
1	Petro Poga	4 December 1912	22 January 1914
2	Mufid Libohova	14 March 1914	3 September 1914
3	Sali Toro	5 October 1914	27 January 1916
*	Petro Poga (Note: Petro Poga served as a delegate from 1918 to 1920.)	25 December 1918	29 January 1920
4	Hoxha Kadri	30 January 1920	14 November 1920
5	Xhafer Ypi	15 November 1920	1 July 1921
6	Dhimitër Kacimbra	11 July 1921	16 October 1921
7	Koço Tasi	16 October 1921	6 December 1921
–	Hoxha Kadri	6 December 1921	12 December 1921
8	Qerim Çelo	12 December 1921	24 December 1921
9	Hysen Vrioni	24 December 1921	12 May 1923
10	Milto Tutulani	12 May 1923	25 February 1924
–	Mufid Libohova	3 March 1924	27 May 1924
11	Benedikt Blinishti	30 May 1924	10 June 1924
12	Stavro Vinjau	16 June 1924	24 December 1924
–	Mufid Libohova	6 January 1925	31 January 1925
–	Petro Poga	1 February 1925	23 September 1925
–	Milto Tutulani	28 September 1925	30 July 1926
13	Josif Kedhi	30 July 1926	10 February 1927
–	Petro Poga	12 February 1927	20 October 1927
*	Ilias Vrioni (Note: Ilias Vrioni was a substitutive minister from 1927 to 1928.)	24 October 1927	10 May 1928
14	Hiqmet Delvina	11 May 1928	5 March 1930
15	Vasil Avrami	6 March 1930	11 April 1931
–	Milto Tutulani	20 April 1931	7 December 1932
–	Vasil Avrami	17 January 1933	16 October 1935
*	Mehdi Frashëri (Note: Mehdi Frashëri was a substitutive minister from 1935 to 1936.)	21 October 1935	7 November 1936
16	Thoma Orologa	9 November 1936	12 April 1938
17	Faik Shatku	31 May 1938	7 April 1939
*	Xhafer Ypi (Note: Xhafer Ypi was member in charge of justice from 8–12 April, 1938.)	21 October 1935	7 November 1936
–	Xhafer Ypi	21 April 1939	3 December 1941
18	Hasan Dosti	3 December 1941	7 May 1942
19	Mustafa Merlika-Kruja	7 May 1942	4 January 1943
20	Andon Kosmaçi	18 January 1943	11 February 1943
*	Javer Hurshiti (Note: Javer Hurshiti was a substitutive minister from 12 February – 28 April, 1943.)	12 February 1943	28 April 1943
–	Andon Kosmaçi	11 May 1943	10 September 1943
21	Rrok Kolaj	5 November 1943	16 June 1944
*	Manol Konomi (Note: Manol Konomi was member in charge of justice affairs representing the Anti-Fascist National Liberation Council from 28 May – 23 October, 1944.)	28 May 1944	23 October 1944
*	Eqrem Vlora (Note: Eqrem Vlora was a substitutive minister serving in the Dine Cabinet.)	18 July 1944	28 August 1944
–	Rrok Kolaj	6 September 1944	25 October 1944
22	Manol Konomi (Note: The quisling Biçaku Government served until October 25, 1944, while the first Hoxha Government, otherwise known as the "Democratic Government of Albania" (a precursor of the Anti-Fascist National Liberation Council) which was a provisional shadow government, started its term two days prior, on October 23.)	23 October 1944	5 March 1951
23	Bilbil Klosi	6 September 1951	13 September 1966
The ministry as an institution was absent from 13 September 1966 until 8 May 1990
24	Enver Halili	8 May 1990	21 February 1991
25	Dashamir Kore	22 February 1991	10 May 1991
26	Fatmir Zaloshnja	11 May 1991	4 June 1991
27	Shefqet Muçi	11 June 1991	6 December 1991
28	Kudret Çela	18 December 1991	3 December 1994
29	Hektor Frashëri	4 December 1994	10 July 1996
30	Kristofor Peçi	11 July 1996	1 March 1997
31	Spartak Ngjela	11 March 1997	24 July 1997
32	Thimio Kondi	25 July 1997	4 June 1999
33	Ilir Panda	4 June 1999	8 July 2000
34	Arben Imami	8 July 2000	6 September 2001
35	Sokol Nako	6 September 2001	29 January 2002
36	Spiro Peçi	22 February 2002	29 December 2003
37	Fatmir Xhafaj	29 December 2003	10 September 2005
38	Aldo Bumçi	11 September 2005	20 March 2007
39	Ilir Rusmali	20 March 2007	24 November 2007
40	Enkelejd Alibeaj	24 November 2007	17 September 2009
41	Bujar Nishani	17 September 2009	21 April 2011
42	Eduard Halimi	21 July 2011	15 September 2013
43	Nasip Naço	15 September 2013	9 November 2015
44	Ylli Manjani	13 November 2015	31 January 2017
45	Petrit Vasili	3 February 2017	21 May 2017
46	Gazment Bardhi	22 May 2017	17 August 2017
47	Etilda Gjonaj	13 September 2017	18 September 2021
48	Ulsi Manja	18 September 2021	19 September 2025
49	Besfort Lamallari	19 September 2025	6 March 2026
50	Toni Gogu	6 March 2026	"Incumbent"

== See also ==
- Judiciary of Albania
