= Spartak Ngjela =

Albanian lawyer and politician (born 1948)

Av. Spartak Ngjela

Member of the Albanian Parliament
- In office 2005–2009
- Constituency: District 41, Tirana County

Member of the Albanian Parliament
- In office 2001–2005
- Constituency: District 38, Tirana County

Minister of Justice
- In office 11 March 1997 – 25 July 1997
- President: Sali Berisha
- Prime Minister: Bashkim Fino
- Preceded by: Hektor Frashëri
- Succeeded by: Thimio Kondi

Personal details
- Born: July 11, 1948 (age 78) Tirana, PR Albania
- Party: Law and Justice Party
- Parent: Kiço Ngjela (father)
- Education: University of Tirana
- Profession: Lawyer, politician

Spartak Ngjela (born 11 July 1948) is an Albanian lawyer, writer and politician. He served as the Minister of Justice in the National Government of National Reconciliation in 1997 and was a member of the Albanian Parliament for two terms.

== Early life and education ==
Ngjela was born in Tirana in 1948. He is the son of Kiço Ngjela, a senior official in the Party of Labour of Albania who served as Minister of Finance and Minister of Foreign Trade during the communist era. Ngjela graduated from the Faculty of Law at the University of Tirana in 1970.

== Professional career ==
After graduation, Ngjela worked as a prosecutor in the District Prosecutor's Office of Vlorë (1970), and later in the Prosecutor's Office of Durrës (1972). In 1973, he became a research associate at the Institute of History in Tirana.

== Imprisonment ==
In March 1979, Ngjela was arrested and sentenced by the District Court of Fier (decision no. 51, dated 23 March 1979) to 10 years in prison for "agitation and propaganda against the people's power", under the penal code of the communist regime. By application of Article 36 of the Penal Code, the final sentence amounted to 13 years of imprisonment starting from 23 March 1979, along with the loss of electoral rights for five years. He was imprisoned in Burrel Prison and released in 1990.

His father, Kiço Ngjela, who had been a high-ranking official and Minister of Foreign Trade until 1975, was also removed from his positions and accused by the regime of anti-party activities. These included promoting unnecessary trade agreements with "revisionist countries," sabotaging the policy of self-reliance, and being an agent of foreign intelligence services such as UDBA, CIA, and KGB.

After his release, Ngjela resumed his legal practice and operated a private law office from 1991.

== Political career ==
Ngjela was appointed Minister of Justice in the transitional Government of National Reconciliation from 11 March to 25 July 1997, serving under President Sali Berisha and Prime Minister Bashkim Fino.

In the 2000 local elections, he ran as the candidate of the Democratic Party of Albania for mayor of Tirana. He lost the race to Edi Rama, who at the time was affiliated with the Socialist Party of Albania and later became Prime Minister of Albania.

He was later elected to the Albanian Parliament for two consecutive terms. From 2001 to 2005 (Legislature XVI), he served as a Member of Parliament representing District 38 in Tirana County, where he won 6,297 votes (51.0%). In the following legislature (2005–2009, Legislature XVII), he represented District 41 in Tirana, with 5,299 votes (38.1%).

During his time in Parliament, Ngjela served as Deputy Chairman of the Committee on Legal Affairs from 2001 to 2003, and later as Chairman of the Committee on Legal Affairs, Public Administration and Human Rights from September 2005 to April 2006.

On 12 December 2008, he founded the political party Law and Justice.

== Books ==
Ngjela is the author of several books, including novels and political or legal works:

- Shpella e Vdekjes (novel, 1994)
- Helena R (novel, 1999)
- Reformë shqiptare: shmangia e karakterit tiranik të politikës (2006)
- Përkulja dhe rënia e tiranisë shqiptare 1957–2010 (2011)
- Pesë leksione për konstitucionalizmin (2015)
- Hakmarrja e një gruaje (novel, 2018)
