= Prisons in Albania =

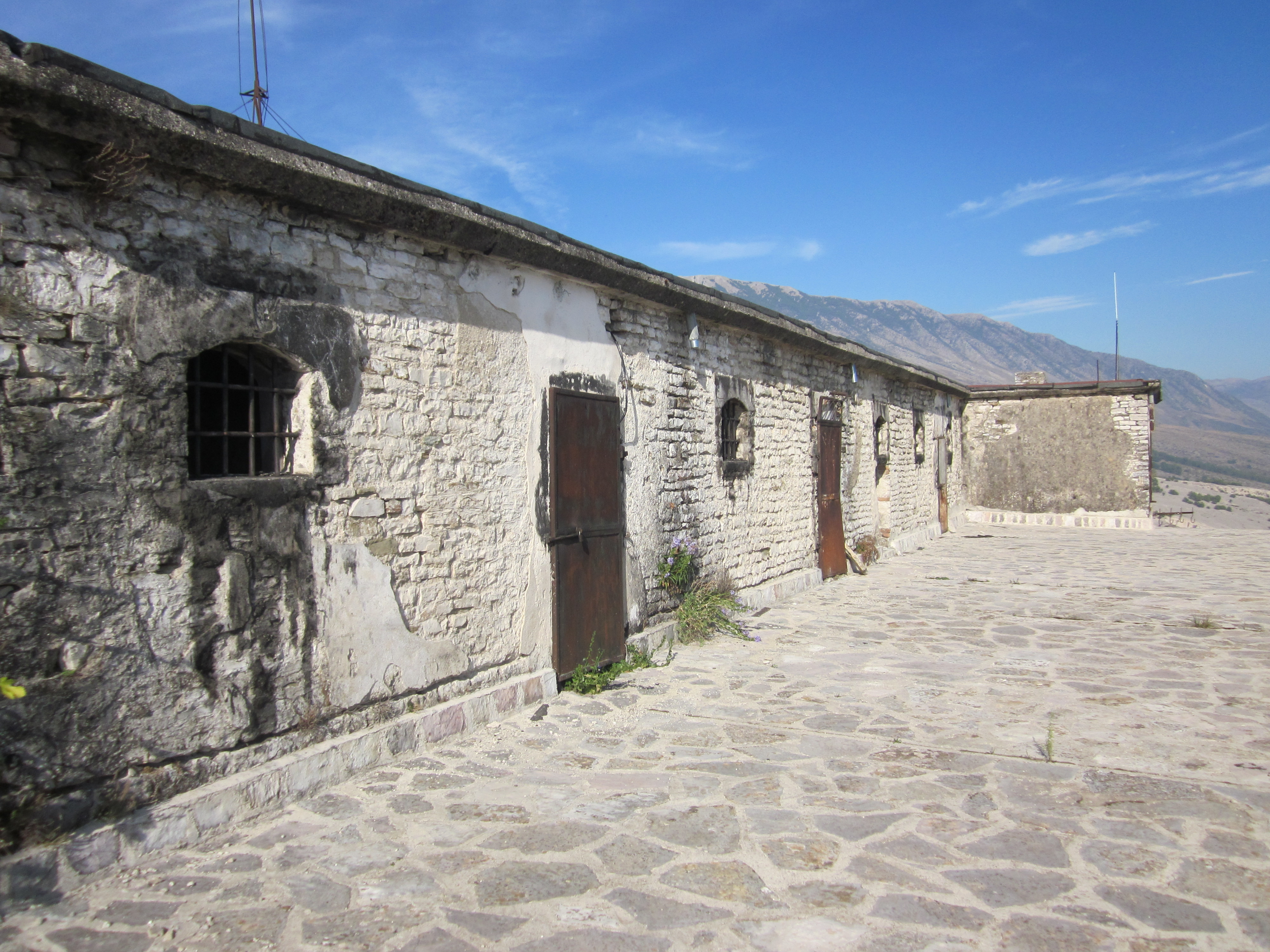
Communist era prison in Gjirokastër

Prisons in Albania are divided into three levels: closed, semi-open, and open. A difference is made between ordinary closed prisons and high security prisons. Most Albanian prisons have separate blocks (wings) for women and children (juveniles), while others keep women and children together.

As in other countries, prisoners in Albania are separated into remanded prisoners (in pre-trial detention) and convicted prisoners (whose sentences are being executed). Prisons in Albania are managed by the General Directorate of Prisons. The country has 22 prisons, 1 prison hospital, and 1 juvenile institute, which have a total capacity of 6,284 inmates.

== Prisons ==
1. IEVP stands for "Institute of Executing Penal Decisions" (Albanian: Institucioni i Ekzekutimit të Vendimeve Penale)
2. IM stands for "Institute of Juveniles" (Albanian: Instituti i të Miturve)

No.	Prison	Capacity	Opened
1	IEVP Berat	37	2007
2	IEVP Burrel	198	1939
3	IEVP Durrës	300	2007
4	IEVP Elbasan	120	2012
5	IEVP Fier	870	2015
6	IEVP Fushë-Krujë	312	2008
7	IM Kavajë	40	2009
8	IEVP Korçë	312	2008
9	IEVP Krujë	196	2001
10	IEVP Kukës	36	2007
11	IEVP Lezhë	700	2006
12	IEVP Lushnjë	189	1975
13	IEVP Peqin	685	2003
14	IEVP Rrogozhinë	343	2002
15	IEVP Sarandë	31	2007
16	IEVP Shkodër	760	2018
17	IEVP Tepelenë	70	1970
18	IEVP Tropojë	25	2007
19	IEVP Vlorë	115	2008
20	IEVP Ali Demi (325)	80	1976
21	IEVP Jordan Misja (313)	320	1944
22	IEVP Mine Peza (302)	300	1944
23	IEVP Vaqarr	146	1999
24	Prison Hospital of Tirana	99	1998
