= Evangjeli II Government =

Former Government of Albania

- 24th Government of Albania
- 1930
- Date formed: 6 March 1930
- Date dissolved: 11 April 1931

People and organisations
- Prime Minister: Pandeli Evangjeli
- No. of ministers: 8

History
- Predecessor: Kotta I
- Successor: Evangjeli III

The Second Evangjeli Government is the 24th government of Albania. It was formed on 6 March 1930 and lasted until 11 April 1931.

== Background ==
After the formation of the Albanian Kingdom (1928–1939), Koco Kotta was appointed as Prime Minister by King Zog. He was pressured into resigning due to economic mismanagement and Italian domination over the Albanian Economy. The next day after the dismissal of Kota, Zogu tasked Pandeli Evangjeli to form a new government.

== Cabinet ==
Evangjeli II Government
Pandeli Evangjeli – Prime Minister and Minister of Foreign Affairs
Hilë Mosi – Minister of Education
Rauf Fico – Minister of Internal Affairs and Minister of Foreign Affairs
Vasil Avrami – Minister of Justice
Mehdi Frasheri – Minister of National Economy
Izet Dibra – Minister of Public Works
Kolë Thaçi – Minister of Finances
Musa Juka – Second Minister of Internal Affairs

== Activities ==
In January 1931 The Cabinet of Evangjeli passed a censure law that classified public criticism of members of the assembly and against the King as a crime. The law came into force immediately and Nebil Cika, a reporter, which criticized the new law was put on trial by the government.

The first economic policy of the new government was the implementation of the long-awaited land reform that would see the Albanian peasantry gain more arable land. At the time 1/3 of Albania's arable land was owned by less than 200 people and only 10% of its arable land was used for growing food. Although the law wouldn't be fully implemented until 1935 due to the government's lack of finances.

Due to an earthquake in southern Albania and a harvesting failure, the government was forced to make a deal with Italy. The deal with Italy was unpopular by the Cabinet of Evengjeli and Zogu pressured him into resigning, effectively ending the second government of Evangjeli.

== Aftermath ==
Nine days after the dismissal of the government, Zogu appointed Evangjeli again to form a new government.

== Sources ==
- Fischer, Bernd. King Zog and the Struggle for Stability in Albania, (East European Monographs, Boulder, 1984).
- Pearson, Owen. Albania and King Zog:Independence, Republic and Monarchy 1908–1939, (I.B. Tauris, 2005)
