= Evangjeli III Government =

25th government of Albania (1931–1932)

- 25th Government of Albania
- 1931–1932
- Date formed: 20 April 1931
- Date dissolved: 7 December 1932

People and organisations
- Prime Minister: Pandeli Evangjeli
- No. of ministers: 8

History
- Predecessor: Evengjeli II
- Successor: Evengjeli IV

The Third Evangjeli Government was the 25th government of Albania. It was formed on 20 April 1931 and lasted until 8 December 1932. The government was a direct successor of the Second Evangjeli Government, formed 9 days after the later dissolution.

== Background ==
The decision of the previous Evangjeli Government to make a deal with Italy was unpopular with the cabinet and the public. This made King Zog force the dissolution of the government. 9 days later, Zog again appointed Pandeli Evangjeli as Prime Minister.

== Composition ==
Evangjeli III Government
Pandeli Evangjeli – Prime Minister
Hysen Vrioni – Minister of Foreign Affairs
Musa Juka – Minister of Interior
Milto Tutulani – Minister of Justice
Lame Kareco – Minister of Finance
Hilë Mosi – Minister of Education
Izet Dibra – Minister of Public Works
Sait Toptani – Minister of National Economy

== Activities ==
The biggest task of the Third government was to lower Albania's dependency on Italy. Despite this, due to the financial burden of the Great Depression, the government was forced to sign several treaties with Italy that would see become Albania's largest trade partner, roughly accounting for 60% of Albanian imports.

The government's deal with Italy also made it so Italian construction companies were privileged in Albania. This, although helped Albania's infrastructure, made the government more and more unpopular with the public.

The government also enforced its censorship rules. during the government term, 200 lawyers, intellectuals, doctors, and others were jailed, and in the end 49 of them were given life in prison.

== Aftermath ==
Following the results of the 1932 election, Evangjeli resigned from his post. Despite this, on January of the next year, Zogu once again tasked Evangjeli with forming a government.

== Sources ==
- Fischer, Bernd. King Zog and the Struggle for Stability in Albania, (East European Monographs, Boulder, 1984).
- Pearson, Owen. Albania and King Zog:Independence, Republic and Monarchy 1908–1939, (I.B. Tauris, 2005)
- Dervishi, Kastriot. Kryeministrat dhe ministrat e shtetit shqiptar në 100 vjet, (Tiranë, Shtëpia Botuese, 2012)
