= Ministry of Economy and Innovation (Albania) =

Government ministry of Albania

- Ministria e Ekonomisë dhe Inovacionit

Department overview
- Formed: 12 February 1929
- Jurisdiction: Council of Ministers
- Headquarters: Rruga "Dëshmorët e 4 Shkurtit", Tirana
- Website: https://ekonomia.gov.al/

The Ministry of Economy and Innovation (Albanian: Ministria e Ekonomisë dhe Inovacionit) is a department of the Albanian government responsible for Economy and innovation in Albania.

The current minister is Delina Ibrahimaj, who is serving since September 2025.

== History ==
Since the establishment of the institution, the Ministry of Economy has been reorganized by joining other departments or merging with other ministries, thus making its name change several times. This list reflects the changes made in years in pluralist history since 1992 as an institution:

- Ministry of Economy, Trade and Energy (Ministria e Ekonomisë, Tregtisë dhe Energjetikës ) from 2005 to 2013
- Ministry of Economic Development, Tourism, Trade and Enterprise (Ministria e Zhvillimit Ekonomik, Turizmit, Tregtisë dhe Sipërmarrjes) from 2013 to 2017

== Officeholders (1929–present) ==
No.	Name	Term in office
1	Musa Juka	12 February 1929	5 March 1930
2	Mehdi Frashëri	6 March 1930	11 April 1931
3	Said Toptani	25 July 1931	7 December 1932
4	Dhimitër Beratti	15 June 1934	7 November 1936
5	Terenc Toçi	23 March 1937	31 May 1938
6	Rrok Gera	31 May 1938	7 April 1939
7	Andon Beça	12 April 1939	3 December 1941
8	Fuad Dibra	3 December 1941	22 December 1941
9	Kostandin Kotte	12 January 1942	4 January 1943
10	Ndoc Naraçi	18 January 1943	11 February 1943
11	Ago Agaj	5 November 1943	16 June 1944
12	Refat Begolli	18 July 1944	25 October 1944
13	Medar Shtylla	23 October 1944	21 March 1946
14	Nako Spiru	22 March 1946	1 October 1948
15	Pjetër Kosta	17 July 1962	13 September 1966
16	Rrapo Dervishi	27 June 1980	22 November 1982
17	Kudret Arapi	23 November 1982	19 February 1987
18	Xhelal Tafaj	20 February 1987	7 July 1990
19	Leontiev Çuçi	11 May 1991	4 June 1991
20	Gramoz Pashko	11 June 1991	6 December 1991
21	Gjergj Konda	18 December 1991	13 April 1992
22	Genc Ruli	13 April 1992	23 November 1993
23	Ylli Bufi	25 July 1997	25 October 1999
24	Zef Preçi	28 October 1999	14 January 2000
25	Mustafa Muçi	14 January 2000	29 January 2002
26	Ermelinda Meksi	22 February 2002	25 July 2002
27	Arben Malaj	29 July 2002	29 December 2003
28	Anastas Angjeli	29 December 2003	10 September 2005
–	Genc Ruli	11 September 2005	17 September 2009
29	Dritan Prifti	17 February 2009	14 September 2010
30	Ilir Meta	17 September 2010	17 January 2011
31	Nasip Naço	20 January 2011	25 June 2012
32	Edmond Haxhinasto	3 July 1992	3 April 2013
33	Florjon Mima	4 April 2013	15 September 2013
34	Arben Ahmetaj	15 September 2013	17 February 2016
35	Milva Ekonomi	26 February 2016	13 September 2017
–	Arben Ahmetaj	13 September 2017	5 January 2019
36	Anila Denaj	17 January 2019	18 September 2021
37	Delina Ibrahimaj	18 September 2021	Incumbent

== Notes ==
- The title "Substitutive" (gheg albanian: Zavëndësisht), often using the acronym "Zav.", references to the temporary exercise of duty by an official who was not formally appointed by the prime minister but occupied the interim role of the vacant minister. These officials are labeled in the list with an asterisk.

== See also ==
- Economy of Albania
