= Dritan Prifti =

Albanian politician (1968–2017)

Minister of Economy, Trade and Energy
- In office 2009–2010
- President: Bamir Topi
- Prime Minister: Sali Berisha
- Preceded by: Genc Ruli
- Succeeded by: Ilir Meta

Member of the Parliament of Albania
- In office 2005–2017
- Constituency: Fier

General Director of the Albanian Power Corporation (KESH)
- In office 2000–2001

Personal details
- Born: 27 August 1968 Berat, PR Albania
- Died: 12 October 2017 (aged 49) Tirana, Albania
- Party: Socialist Movement for Integration
- Children: 4
- Education: University of Tirana; University of New Mexico (MBA); Harvard Kennedy School (MPA)
- Occupation: Politician

Dritan Prifti (27 August 1968 - 12 October 2017) was an Albanian politician and government official, who served as director of the Albanian Power Corporation (KESH) and as Minister of Economy, Trade and Energy of Albania.

== Life and career ==
Prifti was born on 27 August 1968 in Berat, where he also completed his primary education.

He pursued higher education at Harvard University in the USA, graduating with excellent results. In 1997 he returned from the US to Albania and became involved in politics.

From 1997 to 1999, Prifti served as Chief of Cabinet in the Ministry of Finance, and subsequently as Chief of Cabinet in the Ministry of Labour and Social Affairs.

In 2000, he was appointed director of the KESH.

In 2005, he joined the Socialist Movement for Integration (LSI) and won a parliamentary seat representing Fier.

Following the 2009 parliamentary elections, Prifti was elected as MP for the Socialist Movement for Integration and served as Minister of Economy, Trade and Energy from 2009 to 2010.

Prifti was the father of four children. He died October 12, 2017, after a months long battle with leukemia.

== Meta–Prifti video ==
While serving as Minister of Economy, Prifti gained widespread attention in January 2011, when a video recording was made public showing a conversation held in March 2010 between him and Ilir Meta (then Deputy Prime Minister of Albania). The video allegedly showed Meta asking Prifti to manipulate procurement procedures, concessions, and auctions in return for large amounts of money. Meta is also overheard bragging that because he is on good terms with Chief Justice Shpresa Becaj, after having hired her daughter as a diplomat at an embassy, he can influence the decision of the court.

During the 2011 trial of Ilir Meta at the High Court, after three Albanian experts declared the video as manipulated, Meta was exonerated. Earlier forensic analyses by British and American experts commissioned by the prosecution had concluded the recording was authentic, but the court ruled that analysis inadmissible. Prifti strongly defended the authenticity of the recording, publicly challenged the experts’ conclusion, and called for an independent forensic analysis by law enforcement experts of EU countries.
