= Hiqmet Delvina =

Albanian politician

Minister of Justice of Albania
- In office 11 May 1928 – 5 March 1930
- President: Zog I of Albania

Personal details
- Born: Albania
- Party: Party of Traditions

Hiqmet Delvina was an Albanian politician. He was the Minister of Justice of Albania from 11 May 1928 till 5 March 1930. He was succeeded by Vasil Avrami, who was also succeeded by Milto Tutulani. The Ministry of Justice was one of the original ministries created soon after the Independence of Albania in 1912.

| Preceded by Ilias Vrioni | Minister of Justice of Albania | Succeeded by Vasil Avrami |
