= Sacred Union Government (Albania) =

Former Emergency Government of Albania

Evangjeli I Government
- 8th Government of Albania
- 1921
- Date formed: 16 October 1921
- Date dissolved: 6 December 1921

People and organisations
- Monarch: Wilhelm of Wied
- Prime Minister: Pandeli Evangjeli
- No. of ministers: 7

History
- Predecessor: Vrioni II
- Successor: Koculi

The First Evangjeli Government, also known as the Sacred Union Government (Albanian: Qeveria e Bashkimit të Shenjtë) was formed on 16 October 1921 and lasted until 6 December. The government was formed after the territorial Integrity of Albania was threatened by Yugoslavia (see this).

== Background ==
After the end of the Koplik War, a Yugoslav attempt to invade northern Albania, The government of Iliaz Vrioni became unstable. In July following the proclamation of the Mirdita Republic and a second attempt from Yugoslavia to invade Northern Albania, the government of Iliaz Vrioni resigned. Aqif Pashë Elbasani, a member of the High Council of Regency, tasked Pandeli Evangjeli with forming an emergency government with all the main parties in Albania.

== Composition ==
Evangjeli I Government
Pandeli Evangjeli – Prime Minister and Minister of Foreign Affairs
Bajram Fevzi – Minister of Interior
Koço Tasi – Minister of Justice
Ahmet Dakli – Minister of Finance
Hilë Mosi – Minister of Education
Izet Dibra – Minister of Public Works
Isuf Gjinali – Minister of War

== Activities ==
Following its formation, the government submitted a request to the League of Nations to pressure Yugoslavia and recognize the Independence and territorial integrity of Albania. On 7 November United Kingdom agreed with the Albanian request and placed the motion on the Agenda of the Conference of Ambassadors to the League of Nations. Two days later, the motion was signed by the representatives of the United Kingdom, France, Italy, and Japan, recognizing Albanian independence, slightly adjusting the Albanian borders and effectively ending the war with Yugoslavia.

The government, during its negotiations with the League of Nations, tasked Ahmet Zogu to take charge of the Albanian forces and defend the borders of Albania. Zogu proved successful as he had managed to defeat the Mirditor Rebels and halt Yugoslav advances into Albania.

== Aftermath ==
Following the end of the crisis with Yugoslavia most Albanian politicians, including the Ministers of Finance and Education, abandoned the government and Aqif Pashë Elbasani forced the government to resign.

== Sources ==
- Fischer, Bernd. King Zog and the Struggle for Stability in Albania, (East European Monographs, Boulder, 1984).
- Pearson, Owen. Albania and King Zog:Independence, Republic and Monarchy 1908-1939, (I.B. Tauris, 2005)
- Dervishi, Kastriot. Kryeministrat dhe ministrat e shtetit shqiptar në 100 vjet, (Tiranë, Shtëpia Botuese, 2012)
- Qafoku, Roland. Historia e 33 kryeministrave të Shqipërisë nga Ismail Qemali te Edi Rama, (Tiranë, Onufri, 2017)
