= Etilda Gjonaj =

Albanian politician (born 1981)

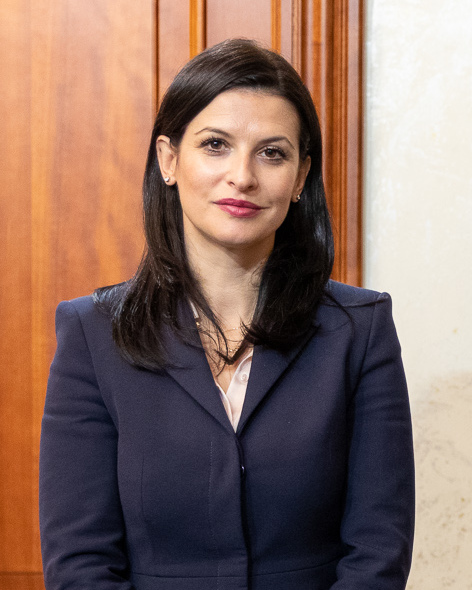

Minister of Justice
- In office 11 September 2017 – 18 September 2021
- President: Ilir Meta
- Prime Minister: Edi Rama
- Preceded by: Gazment Bardhi
- Succeeded by: Ulsi Manja

Commissioner of the People's Advocate
- In office 2014–2017 Serving with Arben Shkembi and Ermir Kapedani

Personal details
- Born: Etilda Saliu; 6 May 1981 (age 45) Pukë, Albania
- Party: Socialist Party of Albania
- Spouse: Irvelin Gjonaj
- Children: 1
- Education: University of Tirana
- Occupation: Politician, lawyer, professor
- Cabinet: Rama II Cabinet

Etilda Gjonaj (born May 6, 1981) is an Albanian politician, lawyer, and professor. She served as Minister of Justice of Albania from September 2017 to September 2021.

== Early life and education ==
Etilda Gjonaj was born Etilda Saliu in Pukë, Albania on 6 May 1981. In 2003, Gjonaj graduated from the Faculty of Law of the University of Tirana. She was admitted as an attorney the next year. In 2011, Gjonaj received a Master's degree in criminal science from the University of Tirana.

Gjonaj also lectured at the University of Tirana prior to taking public office.

== Political career ==
On 10 April 2014, the Parliament of Albania appointed Gjonaj to a three-year term as one of the three commissioners of the Office of the People's Advocate. She served in this role until April 2017, alongside Arben Shkembi and Ermir Kapedani.

On 22 May 2017, Gjonaj was appointed the Deputy Minister of Justice.

In August 2017, Prime Minister Edi Rama announced that he was appointing Gjonaj as the minister of justice.

Gjonaj is a member of the Socialist Party.

== Personal life ==
Gjonaj is married to Irvelin Gjonaj. They have one son.

Political offices
Preceded by Gazment Bardhi	Minister of Justice; 2017–2021	Succeeded by Ulsi Manja
