= Sacred Union (disambiguation) =

The Sacred Union was a French political truce.

Sacred Union can also refer to:

- Sacred Union of the Nation, ruling coalition of the Democratic Republic of Congo
- Sacred Union Government (Albania), former government of Albania
- Sacred Union (Portugal)
