= Besford Dorezi =

Albanian judoka and judo coach

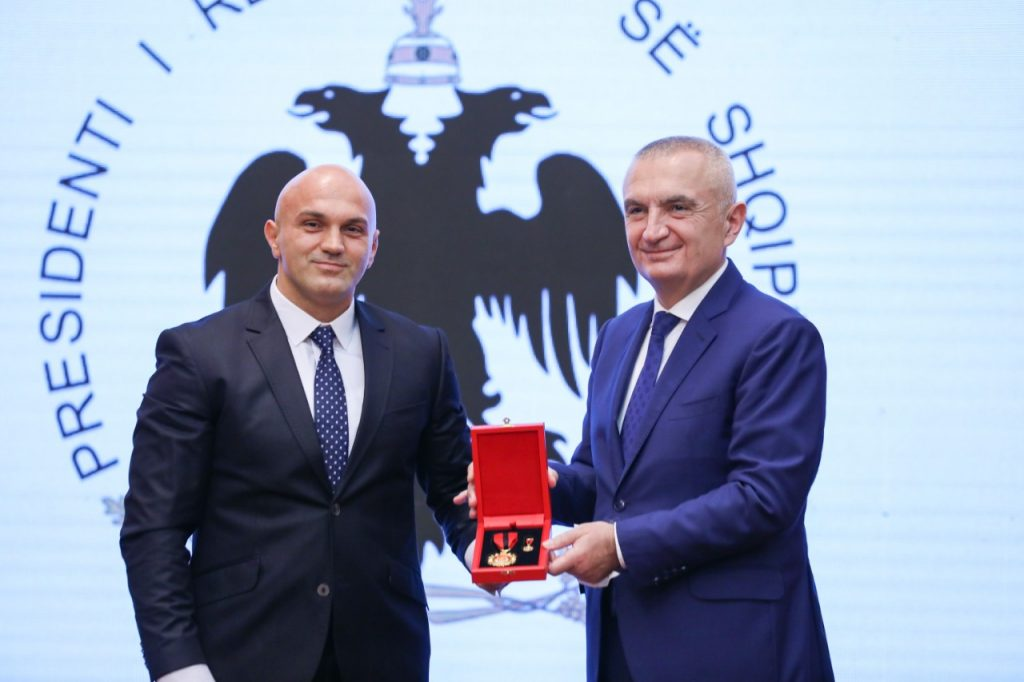
- Besford Dorezi with the President of Albania Ilir Meta during the decoration

Personal information
- Nationality: Albanian
- Born: 13 August 1984 (age 41) Tirana, Albania
- Occupation: Judoka
- Years active: 1995–present

Sport
- Sport: Judo

Besford Dorezi (born 13 August 1984) is an Albanian judoka and judo coach. He has won many national championship titles. He is also a member of the Albanian national Judo team and has participated in important international competitions. In February 2021, he was awarded with the high title "Grand Master" by President of Albania, Ilir Meta.
