= Petrit Vasili =

Albanian politician

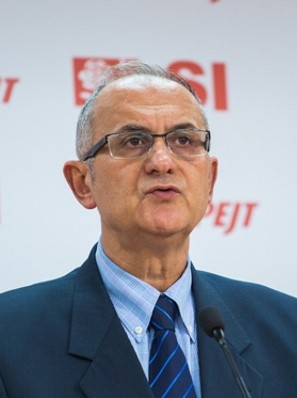

Minister of Justice
- In office 3 February 2017 – 22 May 2017
- Prime Minister: Edi Rama
- Preceded by: Ylli Manjani
- Succeeded by: Gazment Bardhi

Minister of Health
- In office 16 September 2009 – 27 June 2012
- Prime Minister: Sali Berisha
- Preceded by: Anila Godo
- Succeeded by: Vangjel Tavo

Member of Parliament
- In office 9 September 2013 – 8 July 2025

Chairman of the Socialist Movement for Integration
- In office 5 May 2017 – 5 July 2017
- Preceded by: Ilir Meta
- Succeeded by: Monika Kryemadhi

Personal details
- Born: 4 June 1958 (age 67) Tirana, Albania
- Party: Socialist Movement for Integration

Petrit Vasili is an Albanian politician. He was the chairman of Socialist Movement for Integration party and minister of health in the cabinet of Sali Berisha.

== Early life ==
Vasili was born on 4 June 1958 in Tirana. Vasili graduated from the University of Tirana in medicine and completed a postgraduate specialization in Tirana (1984 – 1985) and a doctorate at the Istituto Superiore di Sanità in Rome (1988 – 1991).

== Political career ==
Vasili together with Ilir Meta would go on to create LSI on 6 September 2004. Following the disagreements between Ilir Meta and Fatos Nano. Vasili would become Deputy chair of LSI.

Following the 2009 parliamentary elections the LSI would form a coalition with the PD, where he became the Minister of Health.

As a result of the 2013 parliamentary elections, The LSI prior would withdraw from the coalition between PD-LSI and would join the PS coalition. Where he was elected as a member of the Assembly, In which he represented the Socialist Integration Movement; he held this mandate from September 30, 2013 to April 23, 2017.

He held another ministerial position as the head of the Ministry of Justice from 3 February to 22 May 2017.

On 5 May 2017, he replaced Ilir Meta as the chairman of the Socialist Integration Movement due to Meta's Presidential Candidacy. He held the position until 5 July, when he resigned; his successor was Monika Kryemadhi Ilir Meta's wife.

Today Vasili is a critic of Edi Rama and his government. He has argued that Edi Rama has made Albania a autocratic regime.
