= Institute of Forensic Medicine =

Institute of Forensic Medicine may refer to:

- Institute of Forensic Medicine (Albania)
- L. Greenberg National Institute of Forensic Medicine, Israel
- Mina Minovici National Institute of Forensic Medicine, former institute in Romania
- Institute of Forensic Medicine of the University of Zurich
- Fictitious Queensland Institute of Forensic Medicine in Harrow (TV series)
- Norwegian Institute of Forensic Medicine, now transferred to the Oslo University Hospital
- Ministry of Justice Institute of Forensic Medicine, Taiwan (ROC)
