= Ylli Manjani =

Albanian lawyer and politician (born 1973)

Minister of Justice
- In office 16 September 2015 – 3 February 2017
- President: Bujar Nishani
- Prime Minister: Edi Rama
- Preceded by: Nasip Naço
- Succeeded by: Petrit Vasili

Personal details
- Born: May 7, 1973 (age 53) Lezhë, PSR Albania
- Party: Socialist Movement for Integration (2011–2017)
- Other political affiliations: Socialist Party of Albania (2005-2011)
- Education: University of Tirana
- Occupation: politician
- Profession: lawyer, lecturer

Ylli Manjani (born May 7, 1973) is an Albanian lawyer, lecturer and politician who served as Minister of Justice of Albania from 2015 to 2017.

== Career ==
Ylli Manjani, a jurist by profession, graduated in Law from the University of Tirana. He initially worked with organizations such as the OSCE before becoming Secretary General in the cabinet of Prime Minister Fatos Nano, a position he later resigned from. In 2009, Manjani was a candidate for the Socialist Party in the Lezhë constituency. Following the party’s electoral defeat, he criticized Edi Rama for his opposition style and in 2011 left the Socialist Party to join the Socialist Movement for Integration (LSI). Within the LSI, Manjani held various advisory and executive roles, including serving as Deputy Chairman, contributing actively to legal reform initiatives. He is also known as a university lecturer, legal expert, and a frequent participant in debates on judicial reform, the electoral system, and other political issues.

On 16 September 2015, he was appointed as Minister of Justice, succeeding Nasip Naço. His appointment came as part of the coalition agreement between the LSI and the Socialist Party. During his tenure, Manjani addressed issues related to judicial reform and anti-corruption efforts. He was dismissed from the post on 3 February 2017 and was succeeded by Petrit Vasili.

Following his departure from government, Manjani distanced himself from active politics and eventually resigned from the LSI. He has since returned to legal practice and continued contributing to public debate.

He has regularly provided legal and political commentary in Albanian media.
