= Government of National Salvation (disambiguation) =

Government of National Salvation could refer to:

- Government of National Salvation (occupied Yugoslavia), the second puppet Serbian government of German-occupied Serbia during World War II.
- Government of National Reconciliation, a transitional government in Albania.
