= Nasip Naço =

Albanian politician

Nasip Naço MP

Member of the Albanian Parliament for Berat
- In office 9 September 2017 – 18 February 2019
- Incumbent
- Assumed office 18 September 2021

Minister of Justice
- In office 15 September 2013 – 10 November 2015
- Prime Minister: Edi Rama
- Preceded by: Eduard Halimi
- Succeeded by: Ylli Manjani

Personal details
- Born: 5 April 1961 (age 65) Skrapar, Berat
- Party: Socialist Movement for Integration
- Children: Two
- Education: University of Tirana

Nasip Naço is an Albanian politician and is a member of the Assembly of the Republic of Albania for the Socialist Movement for Integration, former Minister of Economy, Trade and Energy in the cabinet of Sali Berisha. He replaces Ilir Meta, who resigned over allegations of corruption.
