= Ulsi Manja =

Albanian politician (born 1973)

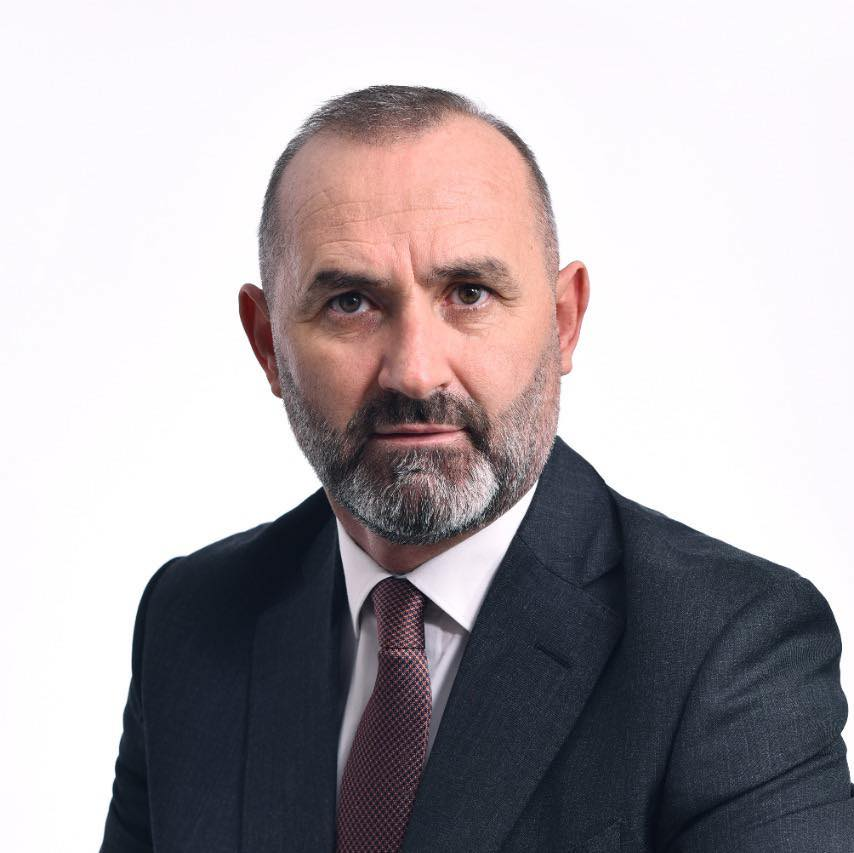
- Official portrait, 2021

48th Minister of Justice
- In office 18 September 2021 – 19 September 2025
- President: Ilir Meta; Bajram Begaj
- Prime Minister: Edi Rama
- Preceded by: Etilda Gjonaj
- Succeeded by: Besfort Lamallari

Personal details
- Born: 5 October 1973 (age 52) Dohoshisht, Dibër, Albania
- Party: Socialist Party of Albania
- Education: Faculty of Law, University of Tirana

Ulsi Manja (born 5 October 1973) is an Albanian politician. He served as Minister of Justice of Albania in the third Rama government led by Prime Minister Edi Rama from 18 September 2021 to 19 September 2025, and is a Member of Parliament (MP) for Tirana.

== Education and Career ==
=== Education ===
Ulsi Manja graduated from the Faculty of Law at the University of Tirana in 1996.
During the years 1999 to 2019 he has completed various trainings in Poland, Denmark, Italy and Germany in the fields of the rule of law, investigation of organized crime and corruption, management and control of the Prosecution system, and on the treatment of convicts in the penal system.
From 2018 he holds a PhD in Criminal Law.

=== Career (1996-present) ===
From 1996 to 2013 Ulsi Manja has served as an assistant-judge, chief prosecutor, prosecutor, and lawyer in the regions of Shkodra, Mirdita, Lezha, and Tirana. During those years Manja has simultaneously worked as a lecturer of criminal law at the University of Shkodra 'Luigj Gurakuqi', and two other Universities in Tirana. From the year 2013 forward, Manja has been serving as a Member of the Parliament with the Socialist Party. Concurrently, has also held the function of the Chairman of the Law Commission for a period of time until 2021.
On September 18, 2021, Manja was appointed as Minister of Justice by Prime Minister Edi Rama making him part of the Rama III government cabinet which was elected on 25 April 2021 in the Albanian Parliamentary election.

== Personal life ==
Manja is married and is the father of three children.

Political offices
Preceded by Etilda Gjonaj	Minister of Justice; 2021–present	Incumbent
