= Kiço Ngjela =

Albanian politician (1920–2002)

27th Minister of Finances of Albania
- In office 6 February 1948 – 1 October 1948
- Prime Minister: Enver Hoxha
- Preceded by: Ramadan Çitaku
- Succeeded by: Abdyl Këllezi

Personal details
- Born: December 25, 1917 Nivan, Gjirokastër, Albania
- Died: 16 June 2002 (aged 84) Tirana, Albania
- Children: Spartak Ngjela (son)
- Relatives: Anastas Ngjela, cousin

Kiço Ngjela (25 December 1917 – 16 June 2002) was an Albanian politician of the Albanian Party of Labour (PPSh).

Ngjela was born in Sheper (Zagori region) of the Gjirokastër District in Albania.

In 1945 he became a member of the Constituent Assembly (Alb: Asambleja Kushtetuese) which declared Albania as a Republic. After 1950, he was a member of the People's Assembly (Alb: Kuvendi Popullor), representing the Tirana District until 10 October 1975. Later, he was temporarily deputy chairman of the State Planning Commission.

On 6 February 1948, Ngjela succeeded Ramadan Çitaku as Minister of Finances in the government of Prime Minister Enver Hoxha. However, on 28 November 1948 he was succeeded in that position by Abdyl Këllezi.

Ngjela succeeded Gogo Nushi as Minister of Trade at a later date. In addition, he was a member of the Central Committee (CC) of the Party from 1956.

Prime Minister Mehmet Shehu called him on 1 January 1966 to join his cabinet as the Minister of Foreign Trade, a post he held until 1 September 1975. He would be part of the delegations to the People's Republic of China.

In September 1975, along with other leading economic politicians as the members of the Politburo of the Party of Labour of Albania as Këllezi and Koço Theodhosi, he was released from his duties and accused of anti-party activity, for having pushed unnecessary trade deals with "revisionist countries" and sabotaging "self-reliance", and of being an agent of UDBA, CIA, and KGB.

His son Spartak Ngjela (born 1948) was also arrested and imprisoned during 1975-1991 as a political enemy. After the collapse of communism he became a politician, was also a member of the Albanian Parliament, and in 1997 became Minister of Justice.
