= Dhimitër Kacimbra =

Albanian lawyer and politician (1875–1950)

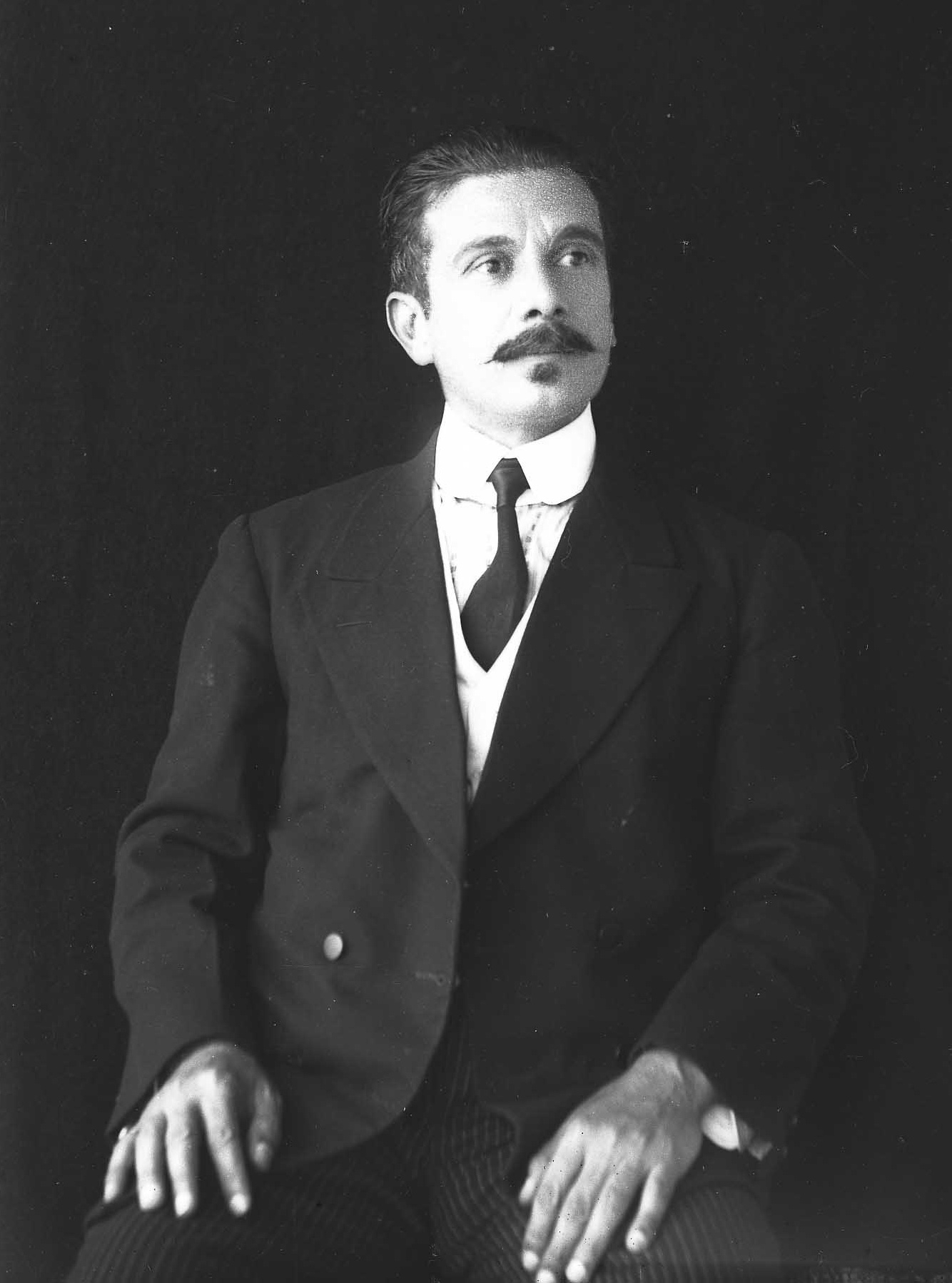
- Dhimitër Kacimbra

2nd Speaker of the Parliament of Albania
- In office 25 September 1920 – 15 November 1920
- Preceded by: Xhemal Naipi
- Succeeded by: Pandeli Evangjeli

Personal details
- Born: 1875 Përmet, Ottoman Empire
- Died: c. 1950 Korçë, Albania

Dhimitër Kacimbra (1875–1950) was an Albanian lawyer and politician who served as the second chairman of the National Council of Albania from 25 September 1920 to 15 November 1920.

== Early life ==
Kacimbra was born in 1875 in Përmet, a small town in southeastern Albania. After attending a local Greek school, he went on to study for two years at the Faculty of Justice, University of Istanbul. Between 1903 and 1908, Kacimbra served as a lawyer in Meçovë and also taught Ottoman Turkish in Greek schools. From 1908 to 1912, he became a member of the initial courts in Margëlliç, Vlorë and Himarë. Five years later he served as a notary public in Përmet.

== Political career ==
As a political activist, Kacimbra participated at the Congress of Lushnjë and Durrës. He was elected member of the parliament during the period between 1920–1924 and 1932–1944, representing Gjirokastër. In 1920 he was appointed as Chairman of the National Council and in the following year would serve as Minister of Justice. In 1929, Kacimbra participated at the 2nd Congress of the Albanian Autocephalous Orthodox Church and in that same year was appointed as Prosecutor of the Control Council, a post he held for three years. He died during the 1950s.
