= Bashkim Fino =

Albanian politician (1962–2021)

Bashkim Fino MP
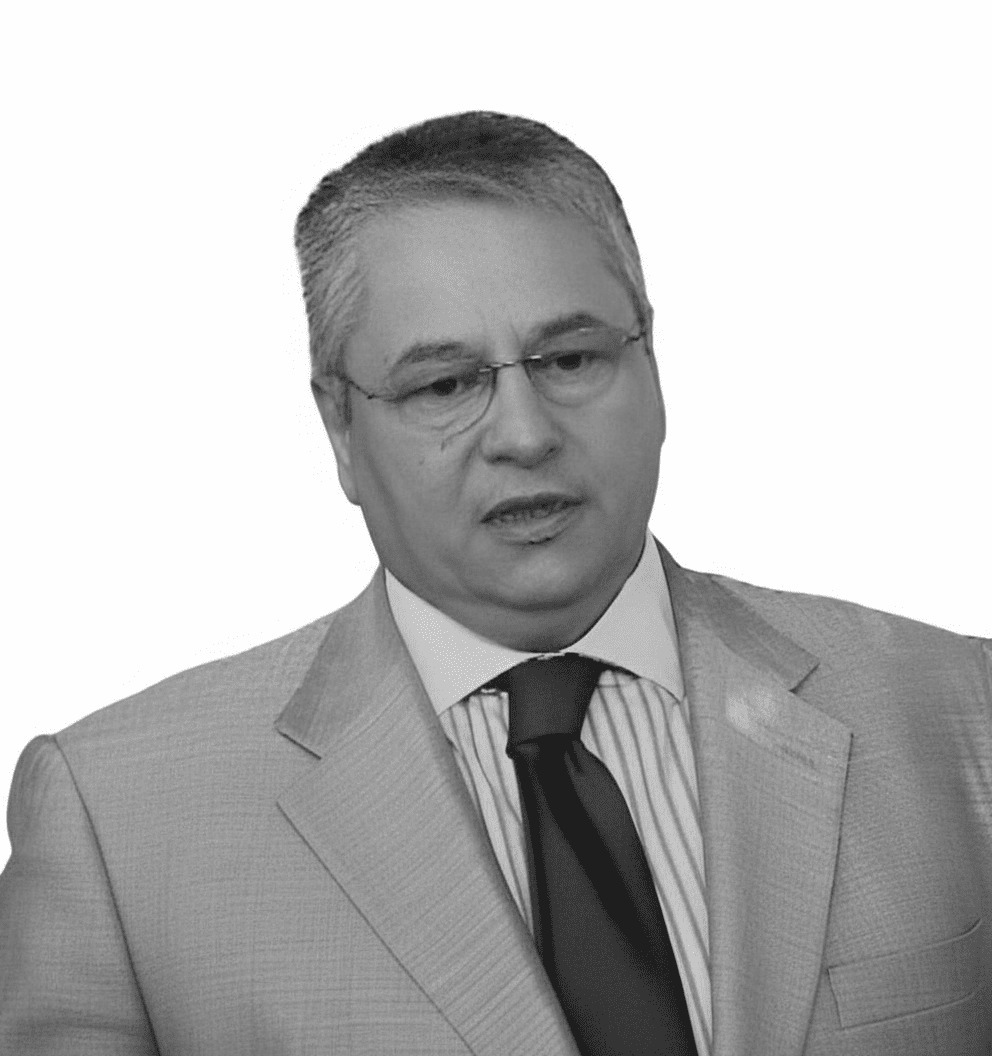

Member of the Albanian Parliament for Fier
- In office 9 September 2017 – 28 March 2021

29th Prime Minister of Albania
- In office 11 March 1997 – 24 July 1997
- President: Sali Berisha
- Preceded by: Aleksandër Meksi
- Succeeded by: Fatos Nano

Deputy Prime Minister of Albania
- In office 25 July 1997 – 23 April 1998
- Prime Minister: Fatos Nano
- Preceded by: Tritan Shehu
- Succeeded by: Makbule Çeço

Minister of Local Government
- In office 28 November 1999 – 6 September 2001
- Prime Minister: Ilir Meta
- Preceded by: Arben Demeti
- Succeeded by: Arben Imami

Mayor of Gjirokastër
- In office 1992 – 1996

Minister of Public Works and Tourism
- In office 6 September 2001 – 29 January 2002
- Prime Minister: Ilir Meta
- In office 29 December 2003 – 1 September 2005
- Prime Minister: Fatos Nano

Personal details
- Born: 12 October 1962 Gjirokastër, Albania
- Died: 29 March 2021 (aged 58) Tirana, Albania
- Party: Socialist
- Education: University of Tirana

Bashkim Fino (12 October 1962 – 29 March 2021) was an Albanian socialist politician who served as the 29th Prime Minister of Albania from March to July 1997.

== Biography ==
Fino studied economics in Tirana and the United States. After this, he worked as an economist in Gjirokastër, and in 1992 became its mayor. He was married and had two children.

On 11 March 1997, Democratic Party President Sali Berisha appointed Fino, a member of the opposition Socialist Party of Albania, Prime Minister in order to lead a government of national unity. This came after rebellion broke out over the collapse of several pyramid schemes leading to the government losing control of much of the country. Fino was Prime Minister through the 1997 elections where his Socialist Party won a large majority before he stepped down and was succeeded by his party leader Fatos Nano.

As of 2014, Fino was a Member of Parliament representing a constituency in the Korçë District. Fino was a lecturer at the Political Academy of the Socialist Party of Albania.

Fino was a devoted fan of Italian football club Inter Milan. In January 2018 he declared his intention to run for president of the Albanian Football Federation, challenging Armand Duka, the incumbent president of the last 16 years. The elections held on 7 February 2018, were lost by Fino, although he claimed that the voting process was irregular and that he would appeal to UEFA and FIFA.

Fino, who had leukemia, died on 29 March 2021, after contracting COVID-19. He was 58.

== See also ==
- Political Academy of the Socialist Party of Albania

Political offices
Preceded by Aleksandër Meksi	Prime Minister of Albania; 11 March 1997 – 24 July 1997	Succeeded by Fatos Nano
