= Government of National Reconciliation =

Government of National Reconciliation Qeveria e Pajtimit Kombëtar
- 56th Government of Albania
- March–July 1997
- Date formed: 12 March 1997
- Date dissolved: 24 July 1997 (135 days)

People and organisations
- President: Sali Berisha
- Prime Minister: Bashkim Fino
- No. of ministers: 16
- Total no. of members: 20 (Note: Including the Prime Minister and the Secretary General the government consisted of 17 members. In addition, 3 Secretaries of State were appointed in the ministries dealing with national security, who were considered ministers without portfolio.)
- Status in legislature: National unity government

History
- Incoming formation: March 9th Agreement
- Legislature term: People's Assembly
- Predecessor: Meksi II Government
- Successor: Nano III Government

The Fino Government better known as the Government of National Reconciliation (Albanian: Qeveria e Pajtimit Kombëtar) was a caretaker government that presided over Albania from 13 March 1997 to 24 July 1997, during the Albanian unrest of 1997. It was created as a result of the social, economic, and political turmoil of early 1997, spurred by the collapse of pyramid schemes and the subsequent loss of many Albanians' life savings. This government was formed in the week following the resignation of the government of Aleksandër Meksi on 1 March 1997 by the major political parties of the country with international support. The Government was voted in the morning session at 10:00 a.m. on 12 March 1997, while received the approval of the President Sali Berisha shortly before midnight on the same day.

== Background ==
After the controversial parliamentary elections held on 26 May 1996, the Democratic Party won an absolute majority in parliament: with 55.5% of the vote, securing 122 out of 140 seats. In addition to the 10 Socialist Party deputies who boycotted parliament, the Republican Party and PBDNJ each had 3 seats each and National Front Party 2 seats. The European Parliament demanded the cancellation of the elections, while the ODIHR did not send observers to the by-elections due to serious shortcomings. In addition to electoral fraud, the election law had favored the ruling Democrats. Hoping that international criticism would soon be forgotten, Democrats moved forward. Aleksandër Meksi was tasked by Berisha to form a new government, which included representatives of the Republican, Social Democratic and Christian Democrat parties.

The Democratic Party had extended control not only to the executive and the legislative, but also to the judiciary, police, electronic media, but mostly to the secret services, which were the strongest weapon that Berisha and the Meksi Government used against protests, criticism and political opponents.

In addition to the political crisis, Albania was also heading towards an economic and social crisis. Several companies operating under the pyramid scheme were established in the country. Lured by very high returns, sometimes up to double-digit interest rates per month, hundreds of thousands of Albanians had invested their savings and in some cases liquidated assets. At the end of November 1996, the first company went bankrupt. The ensuing panic led to the collapse of most of the other pyramid schemes in a row by February 1997. The first mass protest was held in Lushnja on 24 January 1997, where Democratic Party exponents who went there to calm the situation were attacked by outraged crowds. The protests then continued in Vlora and Tirana, to which the government responded with repression and force. On 22 January, the then independent writer Edi Rama, was physically attacked by unidentified individuals, while five days later Socialist Party activist Ndre Legisi also suffered the same fate. In both cases, the police failed to conduct an adequate investigation. The government took increasingly repressive measures in January and February, as demonstrations became more violent and angry crowds looted the headquarters of the ruling party and subordinate government institutions in southern cities. In the last week of January, large-scale arrests were reported in several southern cities, where police and SHIK took protesters out of their homes in the middle of the night without any arrest warrants and detained them for several days and in places unspecified. After their release, many reported physical abuse and torture. Violent protests erupted in early February in Vlora wherein the second protest was held on February 9, during the clashes one protester was killed and many others were injured. The situation worsened day by day with open fighting against SHIK in the city on 27 February, a day after about a hundred secret police forces were sent south from Tirana. Violence quickly spread to other cities in the south, where insurgents attacked police stations, releasing prisoners, and looting army bases with automatic weapons, grenades, and anti-aircraft guns. There were protests in almost every city, some of which included physical confrontations between demonstrators and police officers. The victims demanded compensation and responsibility from the government and, especially in southern Albania, retaliated by destroying police stations and other state facilities. The government increasingly lost control of large parts of the country, while in many cities armed committees of similar citizens were formed in the form of militias called the Rescue Committees (Komitetet e Shpëtimit), which later merged into a so-called National Rescue Committee (Komiteti Kombëtar i Shpëtimit).

On 1 March 1997, Prime Minister Aleksandër Meksi and his ministers was forced to resign due to the situation that came out of control, and a day later a state of emergency was declared that paved the way for the army to act by any means to restore order. The opposition united in one front called the "Forum for Democracy" (Forumi për Demokraci), saw this as a provocation that would worsen the situation and as an indication that Berisha was ready to retain power at any cost. A days later, on 3 March, the Parliament totally controlled by the Democratic Party elected for the second time with a 5-year term the incumbent President Sali Berisha. The cities of Southern Albania, despite the measures taken, were falling one by one into the hands of the rebels. On March 6, due to international pressure and lack of results, Berisha was forced to withdraw his army from the south.

On 9 March 1997, after a meeting with opposition leaders, it was agreed to form an multi-party interim government that would restore public order and create the conditions for early elections before June 1997. At the head of the government it was agreed to put a figure who had not been involved in active politics in Tirana. And after the negotiations, the Socialist Party, the largest opposition party, proposed Bashkim Fino, then acting mayor of Gjirokastër.

== Cabinet ==
On 9 March 1997, then-President Sali Berisha gathered 10 political parties with electoral support at a roundtable to sign the so-called "National Reconciliation Agreement". The main objective of the agreement was to appoint a new provisional government that would help establish public order and create the conditions for early parliamentary elections. It was agreed that the leader of the new government to be nominated by the largest opposition party, which was the Socialist Party, but the president had vetoed the proposals of members of the Presidency of the Socialist Party. Namik Dokle, then chairman of the Socialists, offered as a solution a peripheral figure such as the former mayor of Gjirokastër Bashkim Fino, who was not involved until then with the active politics of the capital. Berisha was inclined to accept the proposal, which he did first by calling Fino in person, and then decreeing it. The government was named the "Government of National Reconciliation", and in the first session at 10:00 a.m. on 12 March 1997, it was voted in parliament with a cabinet of 15 ministers, not including the Prime Minister, 1 Secretary-General, and 3 Secretaries of State charged in ministries dealing with law enforcement institutions. On the evening of that day, the swearing-in ceremony took place in the Presidency Palace, officially paving the way for the beginning of the work of the cabinet.

National Reconciliation Government
(12 March 1997–24 July 1997)
Bashkim Fino – Prime Minister (PS)
Belul Çelo – Minister of Internal Affairs (PD) (until July 4; replaced by Ali Kazazi)
Shaqir Vukaj – Minister of Defence (PS)
Arian Starova – Minister of Foreign Affairs (PBSD)
Arben Malaj – Minister of Finances (PS)
Spartak Ngjela – Minister of Justice (PLL)
Eduart Ypi – Minister of Privatization (PD)
Astrit Kalenja – Minister of Health and Environment (PBK)
Myqerem Tafaj – Minister of Higher Education and Scientific Research (PD)
Luan Skuqi – Minister of Education and Sports (PD)
Haxhi Aliko – Minister of Agriculture and Food (PSD)
Kastriot Shtylla – Minister of Mineral Resources and Energy (PR)
Foto Lluka – Minister of Industry, Transport and Trade (PBDNJ)
Engjëll Ndocaj – Minister Culture, Youth and Women (PDK)
Elmaz Sherifi – Minister of Labour and Social Affairs (PS)
Vasillaq Spaho – Minister of Public Works, Territorial Regulation and Tourism (PR)
Ekrem Kastrati – Secretary General of the Council of Ministers (PD)
Lush Përpali – State Secretary in the Interior Ministry (PS)
Ali Kazazi – State Secretary in the Defence Ministry (PD)
Pavli Zëri – State Secretary in the Foreign Ministry (PSD)

== See also ==
- Council of Ministers
- Prime Minister of Albania
