= Monika Kryemadhi =

Albanian politician (born 1974)

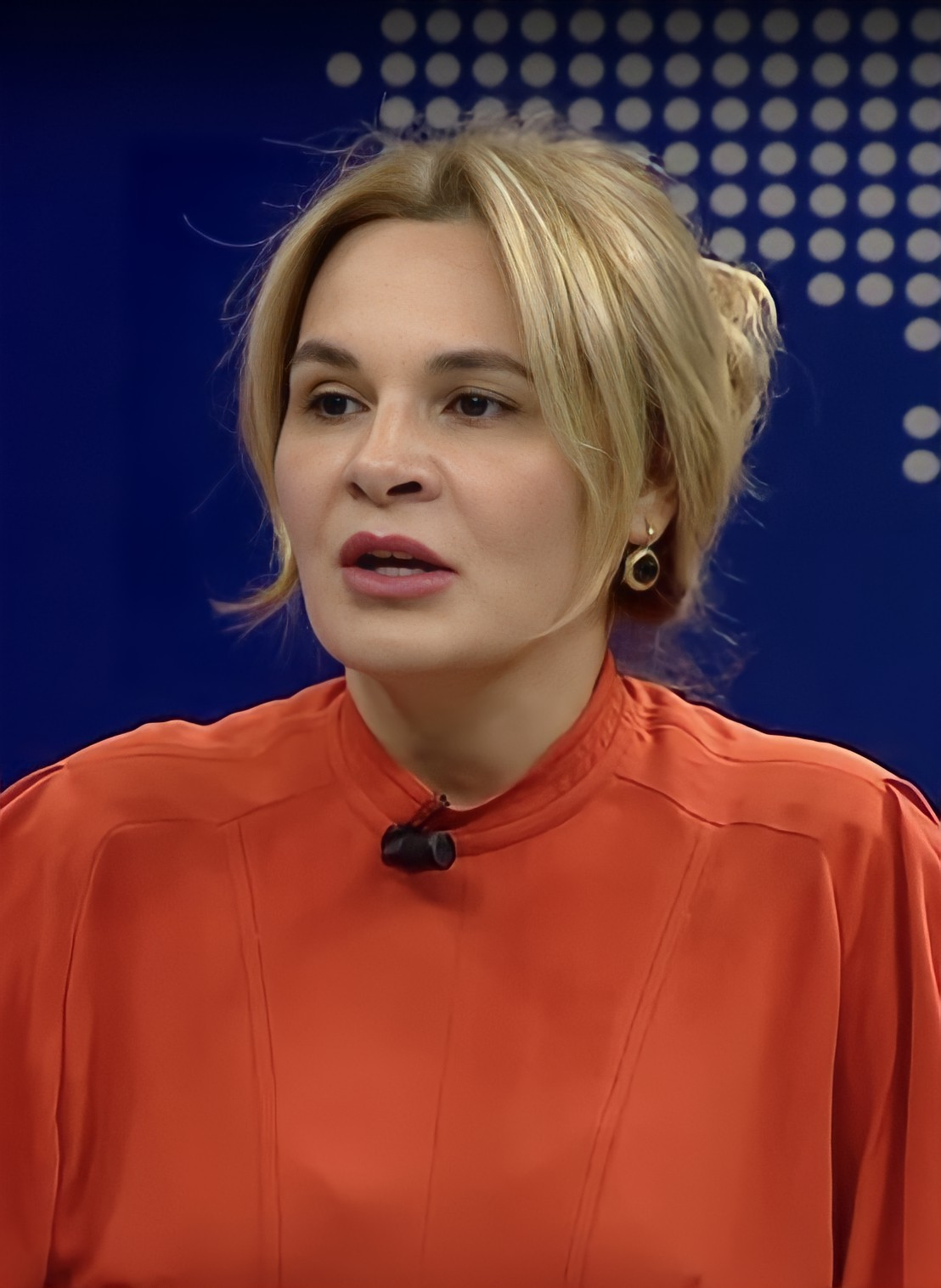
- Kryemadhi in 2017

Member of the Albanian Parliament
- In office 10 September 2021 – 8 July 2025
- Constituency: Fier

First Lady of Albania
- In office 24 July 2017 – 24 July 2022
- President: Ilir Meta
- Preceded by: Odeta Nishani
- Succeeded by: Armanda Begaj

Chairwoman of the Socialist Movement for Integration
- In office 5 July 2017 – 25 July 2022
- Preceded by: Petrit Vasili
- Succeeded by: Ilir Meta

Personal details
- Born: 9 April 1974 (age 52) Tirana, Albania
- Party: PL (2005–present)
- Other political affiliations: Socialist Party (1991–2005)
- Spouse: Ilir Meta (m. 1998; div. 2024)
- Children: 3
- Education: University of Tirana

Monika Kryemadhi (born 9 April 1974) is an Albanian former member of parliament, and a politician who served as leader of the Socialist Movement for Integration (LSI) party. She is the ex-wife of Ilir Meta, LSI's founder and former President of Albania. As of May 2025, she has been under investigation by SPAK for corruption, money laundering and non declaration of assets. In March 2026, the criminal case was referred to trial.

== Life and education ==
She was born on April 9, 1974.

In 1992, she won the right to study in the Faculty of Natural Sciences, and graduated with a diploma in Bio-Chemistry.

In 2000–2002 carried out studies in the Master of Business Administration at the University of Tirana.

She was married to Ilir Meta in 1998 and has three children with him. On 21 June 2024 Ilir Meta and Monika Kryemadhi divorced.

== Political career ==
=== 1991–2017 ===
Her political engagement began in 1991 when she was one of the founders of FRESSH. In January 1992 she was elected a member of the presidency and in May of the same year, she was elected general secretary of FRESSH's congress I and II. She served as President of FRESSH until April 2002. From 1995 to 2000 she was elected vice president of the Socialist International Youth IUSY.

Monika was a member of the Socialist Party from December 1991 to September 2004. She was also a member of the Parliament of Albania from 2001 to 2005, and also was selected two times to the Tirana Municipal Council for which she was elected secretary of the local government delegation to the Council of Europe.

In September 2004, she was one of the founders of the Socialist Movement for Integration.

=== 2017–2025 ===
On 5 July 2017, Kryemadhi became the leader of the Socialist Movement for Integration.

During the presidency of Ilir Meta (2015-2022), although she was his spouse at the time, she refused to take the honorific position of First Lady of Albania, conceding the post to their oldest daughter Bora.

Kryemadhi served in the Parliament of Albania as a member for Fier from 2021 to 2025.

== Plagiarism controversy ==
In October 2018, a public debate over plagiarism occurred in Albania involving the Masters and Ph.D. theses of many politicians and public figures. The denouncement of cases of plagiarism started by Taulant Muka, a young epidemiologist educated in the Netherlands, who waged a crusade against the "fake" PhDs held by many politicians and government functionaries. The thesis of Kryemadhi was one of the many accused of being a case of plagiarism.

== SPAK investigation ==
In October 2024, Albania’s Special Structure Against Corruption and Organized Crime (SPAK) launched an investigation into Monika Kryemadhi in connection to corruption, money laundering and non declaration of assets, within a case that also involved Ilir Meta, her ex-husband. Kryemadhi was subjected to precautionary measures. In May 2025, SPAK formally charged both Kryemadhi and Meta with corruption, money laundering and concealment of assets. In March 2026, the criminal case against Kryemadhi was referred to trial after the Special Court accepted the prosecution’s case.

== Television career ==
She sang a duet with Majlinda Bregu on Kënga Magjike 07 where she was on the jury.

Kryemadhi is one of two commentators for the reality show Big Brother VIP Albania, on its fifth season. Her appearance on the show has drawn some criticism towards her using media visibility to deflect from ongoing legal proceedings. Fjori Sinoruka of Balkan Insight draws parallels between her move and a broader pattern of reputation laundering among Balkan politicians.
