= Eduard Halimi =

Albanian politician (born 1972)

Eduard Halimi MP

Member of the Albanian Parliament
- In office 11 September 2005 – 9 February 2018

Minister of Justice
- In office 21 July 2011 – 11 September 2013
- Prime Minister: Sali Berisha
- Preceded by: Bujar Nishani
- Succeeded by: Nasip Naço

Personal details
- Born: 8 December 1972 (age 53) Korçë, Albania
- Party: Democratic Party
- Children: Two
- Education: University of Tirana

Eduard Halimi (born 8 December 1972) is an Albanian lawyer and former Democratic Party member of the Albanian Parliament, serving from 2005 until 2018, and Albania’s Minister of Justice from 2011 until 2013.

== Early life and education ==
Halimi was born in Korçë on 8 December 1972. He received a bachelor's degree in law at the University of Tirana in 1995. He has held the title 'Magistrate' since 2000. He also graduated from the Police Academy in 1997.

== Career ==
Halimi worked as a lawyer until 2005. During this period, he also served as an expert to the parliamentary inquiry committees. In October 2005, he was named as the Deputy Minister of Justice. In 2007, he was also elected as a Member of the Municipal Council of Tirana. He was appointed the State General Advocate in 2008. He was elected as a member of the Assembly of the Republic of Albania for the Democratic Party of Albania in 2009. During his tenure, he was the Secretary of the Committee on Legal Affairs of the Albanian Parliament from 2009 to July 2011. He was appointed Minister of Justice on 21 July 2011. Halimi is also a member of the Albanian High Council of Justice.

Political offices
Preceded by Bujar Nishani	Albania's Minister of Justice; 2011	Succeeded by Nasip Naço
