= Arta Dade =

Albanian politician (born 1953)

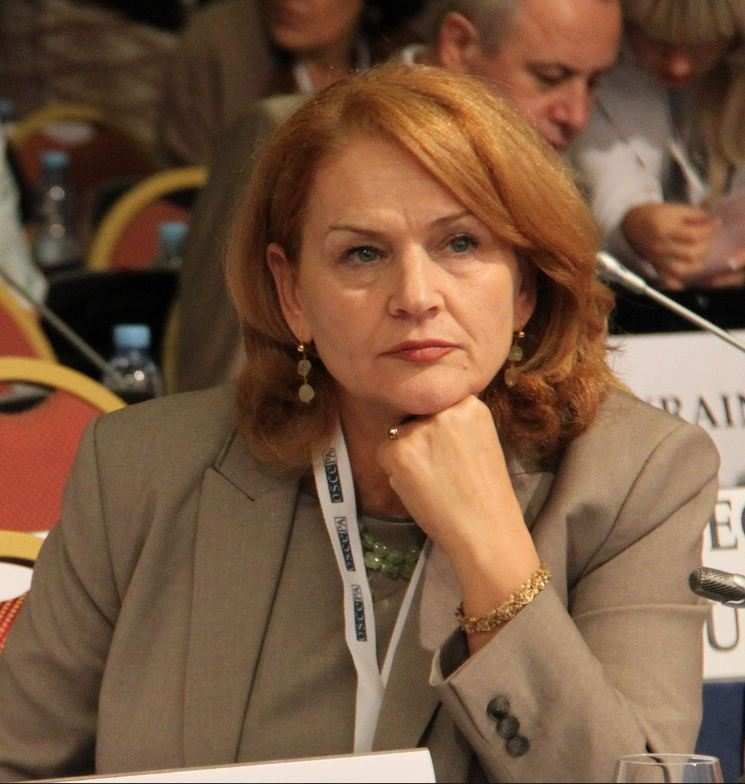

Member of the Albanian parliament
- In office 1997–2017

Minister of Foreign Affairs
- In office July 2001 – July 2002
- Prime Minister: Ilir Meta
- Preceded by: Paskal Milo
- Succeeded by: Ilir Meta

Minister of Culture
- In office July 1997 – April 1998
- Prime Minister: Fatos Nano

Personal details
- Born: 15 March 1953 (age 73) Tirana, Albania
- Party: Socialist Party of Albania
- Children: 2
- Education: University of Tirana

Arta Dade (born 15 March 1953) is an Albanian politician and former member of Parliament of Albania for the Socialist Party. She held government posts such as Minister of Culture and Minister of Foreign Affairs.

== Biography ==
Dade was born in Tirana, Albania. She graduated from the University of Tirana in English Literature. She worked as a lecturer in the University until 1997, when she started her political career. She had joined the Socialist Party of Albania in 1991 and served as a member of the executive committee from 1992.

Dade served from 1997 to 2007 and represented Fier County in the Parliament of Albania. During her political career, she held several government posts such as Minister of Culture and Minister of Foreign Affairs, being the first woman to be appointed a Foreign minister. She also represented Albania at the Parliamentary Assembly of the European Council.

In April 1998, the Greek embassy in Albania put pressure on Fatos Nano to dismiss Dade and the Albanian Minister of Defence Sabit Brokaj, who both opposed the Greek stance on Kosovo, including wanting to arrest Kosovo Liberation Army (KLA) operatives in Albania. President Rexhep Meidani refused to sign Nano's order for their removal. In 2000, while Minister of Culture, Dade signed an agreement on cultural cooperation between Albania and Kosovo. Dade was also an advocate of resolving issues in Macedonia by political means with guaranteed minority rights.

In 2004, Dade and Ben Blushi sued the Democratic Party of Albania's Sali Berisha for libel after she was accused of corruption. The case was settled out of court.

In her last years in Parliament, Dade held the role of the Chair of the Parliamentary Committee on Foreign Policy. In 2016, she was the Chair of the Moldova Group of the OSCE Parliamentary Assembly.

Dade retired from parliamentary politics in 2017. She has continued to be active in Albanian politics, such as giving interviews on current affairs issues and speaking at the Socialist Party's 2025 Political Academy for young members.
