= General Directorate of Prisons (Albania) =

Government agency of Albania

- Drejtoria e Përgjithshme e Burgjeve
- Official logo

Prisons directorate overview
- Jurisdiction: Albania
- Headquarters: Tirana
- Prisons directorate executive: Klevis Qose, Director General
- Website: dpbsh.gov.al

The General Directorate of Prisons (DPB; Albanian: Drejtoria e Përgjithshme e Burgjeve) is an institution in Albania under the umbrella of the Ministry of Justice. The main task of the directorate is the management of criminal institutions, as well as the creation of appropriate conditions for rigorous enforcement of all obligations arising from the existing legal framework, transforming the criminal sentences into re-education options.

The main objectives of the prison system are as follows:

- Keeping prisoners and pre-detainees in appropriate security and housing conditions
- Humane treatment of convicts and pre-detainees
- Managing the efficiency and effectiveness of the general activity in prisons and detention centers

The General Directorate of Prisons has under its supervision 24 penitentiary institutions with a capacity to house 6,284 inmates, as of 2018. Penitentiary Institutions (IEVP) are administrative authorities that execute decisions given by the courts for custody and supervision of prisoners. Presently there are a total of 21 prisons, 1 prison hospital and 1 juvenile institute. The average overcrowding figure is 368 people over the prison capacity.
