= Immovable Property Registration Office =

- Zyra e Regjistrimit të Pasurive të Paluajtshme

Agency overview
- Formed: 13 July 1994
- Jurisdiction: Albania
- Headquarters: Tirana
- Agency executive: Valdrin Pjetri, Chief Registrator
- Website: zrpp.gov.al

The Immovable Property Registration Office (ZRPP) (Albanian: Zyra e Regjistrimit të Pasurive të Paluajtshme) is an entity of the Albanian government responsible for the registration and safekeeping of immovable property titles and other information related to immovable property. ZRPP administers and maintains real estate records, maps indicative of registration and documentation evidencing the ownership and other legal rights over the immovable property.

The organizational structure consists of the central head office and the regional local offices. The limit of their functions is determined by the Prime Minister on the proposal of the Minister of Justice.
