= Ramadan Çitaku =

Albanian politician

Ramadan Çitaku (1914–1990) (known as Baca) was an Albanian politician of the Party of Labour of Albania. A native of Kosovo, he was one of the founding members of the Albanian Communist Party, member of the General Council of the National Liberation Movement during World War II, Minister of Finance of Albania, and diplomat.

== Biography ==
Çitaku was born in Mitrovica, Kosovo, which had only a few years before come under Serbian control. He studied in the "Harry Fultz Technical School" in Tirana, along with other future prominent Albanian communists as Anastas Lula, Sadik Premtja, Muhamet Gjollesha, Mehmet Shehu, and Sadik Stavaleci. He was one of the founding members of the Albanian Communist Party, which after World War II was transformed into Party of Labour. He was a representative of the "Youth" (Alb: Rinia) Communist Group. He was elected member of the Central Committee and its Politburo in March 1943.

.

A trusted man of the Yugoslav communist Miladin Popović, Çitaku took active part during World War II using the name Ibrahim Baci. He was member of the 118-people Antifascist Council of National Liberation Movement or LANC (the main Albanian resistance front during World War II) established by the Congress of Përmet which took place on 24 May 1944 declaring the LANC council as a transitional parliament and establishing a provisional government, thus being crucial in helping the communists to take the power. In 1945, he became a member of the Constituent Assembly (Alb: Asambleja Kushtetuese), the first Albanian Parliament of post-World War II. He remained there until 1950.

On 22 October 1944, due to his rich warfare curricula and without any distinguished skills in finance, he was elected Minister of Finance in the government of Prime Minister Enver Hoxha. He retained this position until his replacement by Kiço Ngjela on February 6, 1948. In 1946, he became the first Chairman of the Albanian-Yugoslav Friendship Society (Alb: Shoqata e miqësisë Shqipëri-Jugosllavi). In addition, during 1947–1948, he served as ambassador in Yugoslavia. He served also as delegate of post-war Albanian governments in conferences and meetings.

A quiet man by nature, Çitaku could not escape the persecution and displacement that followed most of the key personalities of the Communist Party and World War II by Hoxha's clans. He was expelled from the Party during the 1st Congress of November 1948, but without any harsh consequences. From that moment he kept a very low profile. He served as head of the Savings Bank for some time, and was rehabilitated later. He rarely left his house and most of the Albanians didn't even know he was alive. Çitaku died at an old age on (4-5?) April 1990 and was buried on the 6th. Between the other participants in his funeral were the Politburo of the Labour Party of Albania members Rita Marko and Manush Myftiu, and candidate-members Pirro Kondi, Kiço Mustaqi, and Llambi Gegprifti.

A street in Tirana is named after him.
