= Integrimi =

Albanian newspaper

Integrimi Integration

- Owner: Part of Freedom Party of Albania
- Publisher: Freedom Party of Albania
- Language: Albanian
- Website: Integrimi

Integrimi (English: Integration) is a newspaper published in Albania.

== Content ==
=== Sections ===
The newspaper is organized in three sections, including the magazine.

1. News: Includes International, National, Tirana, Politics, Business, Technology, Science, Health, Sports, Education.
2. Opinion: Includes Editorials, Op-Eds and Letters to the Editor.
3. Features: Includes Arts, Movies, Theatre, and Sport.

=== Web presence ===
Integrimi has had a web presence since 2007. Accessing articles requires no registration.

== Pricing ==
The paper's price is 20 Leke and could by bought by local shops. The newspaper is for subscribers available in Albania.
