= Institute of Forensic Medicine (Albania) =

Albanian research institute

Institute of Forensic Medicine of Albania
- Instituti i Mjekësisë Ligjore
- The coat of arms of the Albanian Institute of Forensic Medicine

Agency overview
- Formed: 2001
- Jurisdiction: Government of Albania
- Headquarters: Tirana
- Agency executive: Bledar Xhemali, Director General
- Parent agency: Ministry of Justice
- Website: mjeksialigjore.gov.al

The Albanian Institute of Forensic Medicine (Albanian: Instituti i Mjekësisë Ligjore, IML) is the national forensics institute of Albania organized under the Ministry of Justice, responsible for forensic psychiatry, forensic chemistry, forensic medicine, and forensic genetics.

== Organisation ==
The agency performs laboratory analyses of samples which have been taken from various types of crime scenes to solve the investigative-judicial issues of a medical and biological nature. At the same time, the Ministry of Health and Health Institutions uses data of forensic expertise to strengthen the technical-scientific discipline, improve the quality of medical-diagnostic work, preventive war against negligence and medical errors, and in the study of causes of traumas, poisonings, unexpected deaths, etc.

=== Main tasks ===
- Scientific research activity for the identification and implementation of contemporary methods in the field of forensic medicine.
- Organizing and conducting the activity of the forensic expertise services in the Republic of Albania.
- Performing forensic, pathological, toxicological, biological and psychiatric expertise, as well as other actions, according to the cases and procedures provided for in the laws of the Republic of Albania
- Coordination of the activity of this Institute with health institutions for the prevention of criminal offenses, endangering the life and health of patients.
- Continuous scientific training and qualification of forensic specialists.
- Coordination of activity with international counterpart institutions.

== See also ==
- Ministry of Justice
