= Qerim Çelo =

Albanian politician

Minister of Justice of Albania
- In office 12 December 1921 – 24 December 1921
- President: Zog I of Albania

Personal details
- Born: Albania
- Party: Party of Traditions

Qerim Çelo was an Albanian politician. He was the former Minister of Justice of Albania from 12 December 1921 till 24 December 1921. He was succeeded by Hysen Vrioni, who was also succeeded by Milto Tutulani.

| Preceded by Hoxha Kadri | Minister of Justice of Albania | Succeeded by Hysen Vrioni |
