= Korçë Prison =

Prison in Korçë, Albania

Coordinates: 40°35′2″N 20°46′24″E

The High Security prison Drenovë, or Drenovë Prison, in Drenovë, Korçë (Albanian: Burgu i Sigurisë së Lartë Drenovë), is a prison located in Korçë, Albania.
