= Thimio Kondi =

Albanian judge and former Minister of Justice (1948-2020)

Chief Justice of the Supreme Court of Albania
- In office 1999–2008

Minister of Justice
- In office August 1997 – June 1999

Personal details
- Born: 7 February 1948 Gjirokastër, PR Albania
- Died: 26 August 2020 (aged 72) Tirana, Albania
- Education: Faculty of Law, University of Tirana
- Profession: Judge, lawyer

Thimio Kondi (7 February 1948 – 26 August 2020) was an Albanian judge and government official, who served as the Chief Justice of the Supreme Court of Albania from 1999 to 2008, and as Minister of Justice from August 1997 to June 1999.

== Career ==
Kondi graduated from the Faculty of Law in Tirana in 1977. From 1978 to 1982, he served as a judge in the Fier District Court. Between 1982 and 1990, he worked as a specialist in the Research Sector of the Supreme Court, and from 1990 to 1992, he was Director of the Research Directorate at the Ministry of Justice.

He served as a judge of the Constitutional Court from 1992 to 1994, and between 1995 and 1997 he practiced as a lawyer at the Albanian Human Rights Center. In 1997, he was appointed Minister of Justice, a position he held until 1999.

From 1999 to 2008, Kondi was Chief Justice of the Supreme Court. During this period, he also served ex officio in various roles, including:

- Member of the High Council of Justice
- Chairman of the Governing Board of the School of Magistrates
- Chairman of the National Judicial Conference

Between 2008 and 2013, he returned to legal practice as a lawyer. He was also a member of the Advisory Board of the International Association for Court Administration.

== Death ==
Thimio Kondi died on 26 August 2020, at the age of 72.
