= Josif Kedhi =

Albanian politician

Minister of Justice of Albania
- In office 30 July 1926 – 10 February 1927
- President: Zog I of Albania

Personal details
- Born: Berat, Albania
- Party: Party of Traditions

Josif Kedhi was an Albanian politician, activist, and lawyer. He was the former Minister of Justice of Albania from 30 July 1926 till 10 February 1927. He was succeeded by Petro Poga, who was also succeeded by Ilias Vrioni. The Ministry of Justice was one of the original ministries created soon after the Independence of Albania in 1912.

Preceded by Milto Tutulani	Minister of Justice of Albania	Succeeded by Petro Poga
