= 2017 Albanian presidential election =

Election of Ilir Meta

- 19 - 28 April 2017
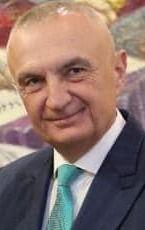
Nominee	Ilir Meta
Party	LSI
Electoral vote	87
Percentage	62.1%
President before election
Bujar Nishani
Democratic Party
Elected President
Ilir Meta
Socialist Movement for Integration

Indirect presidential elections were held in Albania on 19, 20, 27 and 28 April 2017, the eighth such elections since the collapse of the communist regime in 1991. In the first through third round, no candidates were proposed and no vote took place in the Parliament of Albania. In the fourth round, the incumbent Chairperson and former Prime Minister of Albania, Ilir Meta was elected as the seventh President of Albania with 87 votes.

The Opposition of Albania did not take part in the election, due to the general boycott of the Parliament announced during the 2017 opposition protest.

== Criteria and procedure ==
The election of the president of Albania is regulated by the constitution of Albania, particularly articulated in the fourth part, comprising articles 86 to 94. In order to be eligible for candidacy, individuals must fulfill several criteria as delineated in the constitution: they must be Albanian citizens by birth, have resided in Albania for no less than the past 10 years, be at least 40 years of age, and possess the right to vote. Furthermore, the constitution mandates that the president shall not occupy any other public office, be affiliated with any political party, or engage in private business activities. The electoral process commences with the parliament of Albania, which is responsible for scheduling elections at least 30 days prior to the expiration of the incumbent term of the president. Candidates are nominated through a formal process in which a group of at least 20 members of the total 140 members of the parliament may propose an individual for the presidency.

The election of the president is conducted by the parliament through a secret ballot without debate, requiring a candidate to secure a majority of three-fifths of all members of the parliament. If this majority is not achieved in the first ballot, a second ballot is held within seven days, followed by a third ballot if necessary. If no candidate receives the required majority after the third ballot, a fourth ballot occurs within seven days, limited to the two candidates with the highest votes from the previous round. If neither candidate secures the necessary majority in the fourth ballot, a fifth ballot is conducted. If, after the fifth ballot, neither candidate achieves the required majority, the parliament is dissolved, necessitating subsequent parliamentary elections within 60 days. The successive elected parliament is then responsible for electing the president according to the procedures regulated in the constitution. Further, if the parliament fails to elect a president, it correspondingly will be dissolved, requiring another round of general elections within the same period.

Upon election, the president begins their duties after taking an oath before the parliament, affirming their commitment to uphold the constitution and laws of Albania, respect the rights and freedoms of citizens, protect the independence of the nation, and serve the general interest and progress of the Albanians. The term of office for the president is defined at five years, with the possibility of re-election for a maximum of two consecutive terms. In the event that a president resigns before the end of their term, they are prohibited from being a candidate in the subsequent presidential election. When the president is temporarily unable to exercise their functions or if the office becomes vacant, the speaker of the parliament of Albania assumes the responsibilities of the president. If the president is unable to fulfill their duties for more than 60 days, the parliament must decide, by a two-thirds majority, whether to refer the issue to the constitutional court. The court determines the incapacity of the president, and if incapacity is confirmed, the election of a successive president must commence within 10 days of such determination.

== Candidates and results ==
During the first round on 19 April 2017, the second round on 20 April 2017 and the third round on 27 April 2017, no voting took place because no candidates were proposed. A three-fifths majority of 87 votes out of 140 Members of the Parliament was necessary for a candidate to be elected in the first three rounds.

At the fourth round on 28 April 2017, Ilir Meta of the Socialist Movement for Integration was elected as President of Albania, in which only an absolute majority of 71 votes out of 140 Members of the Parliament was necessary for a candidate to be elected. 87 of the members of the Parliament voted for Meta and only 2 against.

Results of the 2017 Albanian presidential election
Candidate	Party (Note: In accordance with Article 89 of the Albanian constitution, which was enacted in 1998, the president is prohibited from maintaining affiliation with any political party. Consequently, the individual elected to the presidency is required to renounce their party affiliations for the duration of their presidential term.)	First round		Second round		Third round		Fourth round	
Candidate	Party	Votes	%	Votes	%	Votes	%	Votes	%
Ilir Meta	LSI	No candidates						87	97.75
Against		No candidates						2	2.25
Required majority		84 votes						71 votes	
Valid votes		—						89	100
Abstentions		—						0	0
Total								89	100
Absents		—						51	36.43
Registered voters		—						140	63.57

== Aftermath ==
=== International responses ===
- Denmark – Queen Margrethe II extended her congratulations to Meta upon his inauguration, offering her sincere best wishes for both him and the Albanian people.
- Kosovo – President Hashim Thaçi extended his congratulations to Meta, emphasising Meta's underscoring a commitment to consensus and inter-institutional cooperation, along with a readiness to enhance longstanding relations between the two nations. Prime Minister Isa Mustafa congratulated Meta, expressing confidence that he will play a crucial role in advancing progressive developments and serving as a strong guarantor of unity in Albania.
- Netherlands – King Willem-Alexander sent a congratulatory message to Meta, emphasising the commitment to developing bilateral relations during his presidential term.
- Slovakia – President Andrej Kiska conveyed his congratulations, affirming that Slovakia will continue to support the nation on its path toward European integration and that the relations between the two countries will remain strong.
- Spain – King Felipe VI conveyed his congratulations to Meta, wishing him success in his mission for the prosperity of the Albanian people.
- Turkey – President Recep Tayyip Erdoğan sent a congratulatory message to Meta, expressing confidence that he will continue efforts to deepen the fraternal relations between the two countries and emphasising Turkey's support for the nation on its path toward European integration.

== See also ==
- President of Albania
- Politics of Albania
- 2017 Albanian parliamentary election
