= Benedikt Blinishti =

Albanian politician

Minister of Justice of Albania
- In office 30 May 1924 – 6 December 1921
- President: Zog I of Albania

Personal details
- Born: Albania
- Party: Party of Traditions

Benedikt Blinishti was an Albanian politician and activist. He was the former Minister of Justice of Albania from 30 May 1924 till 10 June 1924. He was succeeded by Stavro Vinjau, who was also succeeded by Mufid Libohova.

Preceded by Mufid Libohova	Minister of Justice of Albania	Succeeded by Stavro Vinjau
