= Prison Hospital of Tirana =

Prison in Tirana, Albania

Coordinates: 41.339368°N 19.832878°E

- Interactive map of Prison Hospital of Tirana
- Location: Tirana, Albania
- Security class: Maximum
- Opened: 1930; 1998
- Closed: 1945; 1998
- Managed by: Albanian Kingdom; Republic of Albania

The Prison Hospital of Tirana (Albanian: Burgu i Spitalit të Tiranës) is a prison in Tirana, Albania. It was established in 1930. It was closed under the Communist regime, but was reopened in 1998.
