= Koço Tasi =

Albanian politician

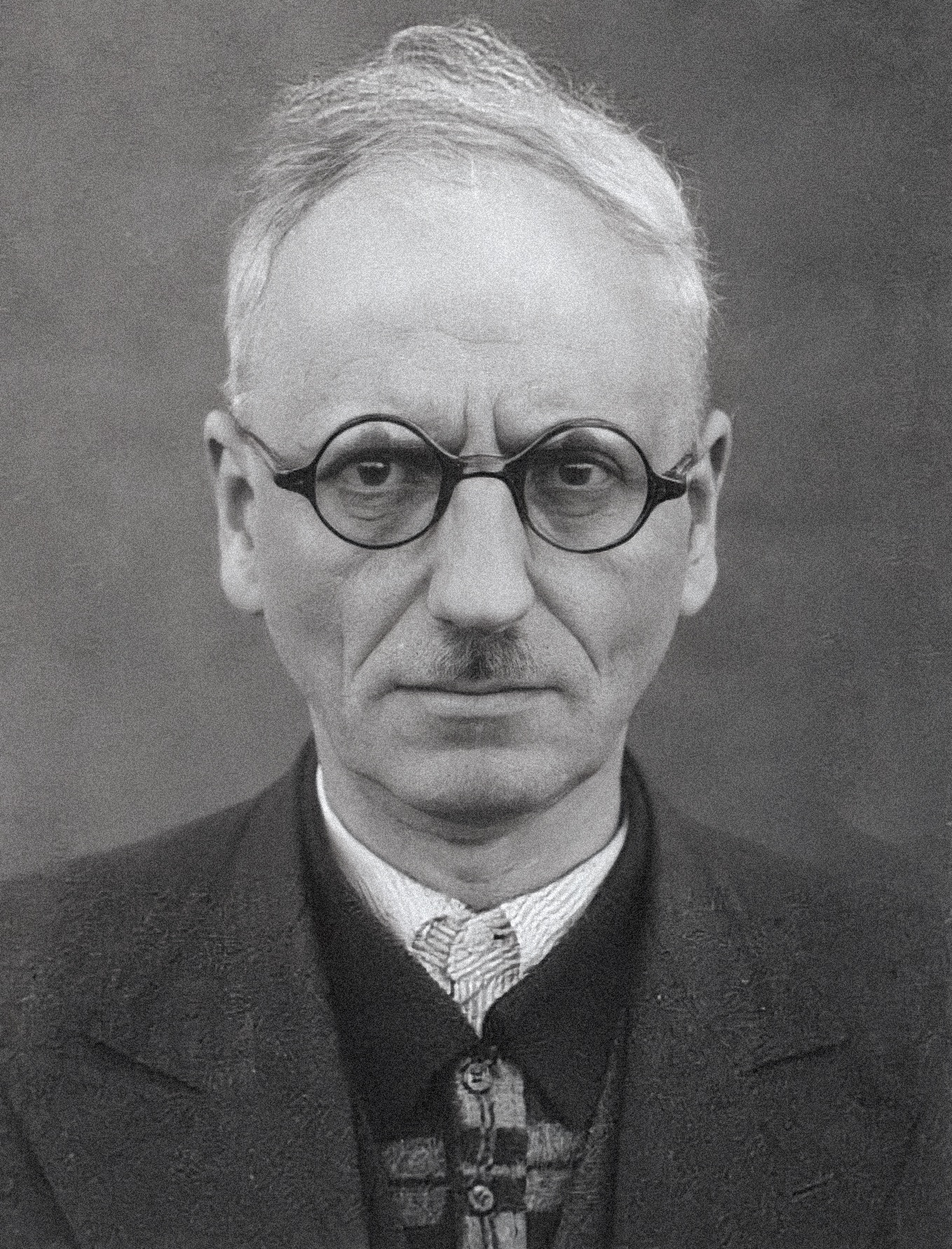

Minister of Justice of Albania
- In office 16 October 1921 – 6 December 1921
- President: Zog I of Albania

Personal details
- Born: Albania
- Party: Party of Traditions

Koço Tasi was an Albanian politician. He was the former Minister of Justice of Albania from 16 October 1921 till 6 December 1921. He was succeeded by Qerim Çelo, who was also succeeded by Hysen Vrioni. The Ministry of Justice was one of the original ministries created soon after the Independence of Albania in 1912.

Preceded by Dhimitër Kacimbra	Minister of Justice of Albania	Succeeded by Qerim Çelo
