= Hektor Frashëri =

Albanian politician

Hektor Frashëri was the minister for justice for Albania in the 1992 government of Sali Berisha. He is a member of the Democratic Party.
