= Vasil Avrami =

Albanian politician

Minister of Justice of Albania
- In office 6 March 1930 – 11 April 1931
- President: Zog I of Albania

Personal details
- Born: Albania
- Party: Party of Traditions

Vasil Avrami was an Albanian politician and activist. He was the former Minister of Justice of Albania from 6 March 1930 till 11 April 1931. He was succeeded by Milto Tutulani, who was also succeeded by Mehdi Frashëri.

Preceded by Hiqmet Delvina	Minister of Justice of Albania	Succeeded by Milto Tutulani
