= Stavro Vinjau =

Albanian politician

Minister of Justice of Albania
- In office 16 June 1924 – 24 December 1924
- President: Zog I of Albania

Personal details
- Born: Albania
- Party: Party of Traditions

Stavro Vinjau was an Albanian politician, activist and educator. He was the former Minister of Justice of Albania from 16 October 1921 till 6 December 1921. He was succeeded by Mufid Libohova, who was also succeeded by Petro Poga.

Preceded by Benedikt Blinishti	Minister of Justice of Albania	Succeeded by Mufid Libohova
