= Milto Tutulani =

Albanian politician

Minister of Justice of Albania
- In office 12 May 1923 – 25 February 1924
- President: Zog I of Albania

Personal details
- Born: 1897 Berat, Albania
- Party: Party of Traditions

Milto Tutulani was an Albanian politician and activist. He was the former Minister of Justice of Albania from 12 May 1923 till 25 February 1924. He was succeeded by Benedikt Blinishti, who was also succeeded by Stavro Vinjau. The Ministry of Justice was one of the original ministries created soon after the Independence of Albania in 1912.

Preceded by Hysen Vrioni	Minister of Justice of Albania	Succeeded by Benedikt Blinishti
