= Freedom Party of Albania =

Albanian political party

Freedom Party of Albania Partia e Lirisë së Shqipërisë
- Abbreviation: PL
- President: Ilir Meta
- General Secretary: Tedi Blushi
- Founder: Ilir Meta
- Founded: 6 September 2004; 22 years ago
- Split from: Socialist Party of Albania
- Headquarters: Sami Frasheri, Godina 20/10, Tirana
- Newspaper: Integrimi
- Ideology: Social democracy; Social conservatism; Pro-Europeanism
- Political position: Centre
- National affiliation: Bashkë Fitojmë; Alliance for a Magnificent Albania
- Colours: Red, black and white
- Parliament: 4 / 140
- Municipality: 1 / 61

Website
- partiaelirise.al

The Freedom Party (Albanian: Partia e Lirisë, PL), formerly known as the Socialist Movement for Integration (Albanian: Lëvizja Socialiste për Integrim, LSI), is a social democratic political party in Albania. The party was formed on 6 September 2004, when Ilir Meta defected from the Socialist Party of Albania (PS). A proposal to change its logo, name and other symbols was unanimously approved at the party's National Convention (Congress) on 25 July 2022. The party is seen as more socially conservative than the Socialist Party of Albania.

Through the use of the term "movement", the party attempted to give the message that it is open and inclusive. The other reason for using this term was its intention to differentiate itself from the other parties. It was the first Albanian political party to employ the one member, one vote system in March 2005 to elect its leader, Ilir Meta.

== Elections ==
At the 2005 parliamentary election the party won five seats in the Albanian Parliament with 8.4% of the vote. The party was mostly supported by the Albanian youth at the 2005 elections. At the 2009 parliamentary election it won four seats with 4.8% of the vote. The party along with PSV91 became the determining parties to form the government coalition. In June 2009 the PL allied with the centre-right Democratic Party of Albania (PD) to form the government coalition.

PL successfully increased its share of the vote in the 2013 parliamentary election, winning 16 seats with 10.4% of the vote.

Election	Leader	Votes	%	Seats	+/–	Rank	Government
2005	Ilir Meta	112,449	8.24	5 / 140	New	5th	Opposition
2009	Ilir Meta	73,678	4.85	4 / 140	▼1	▲3rd	Coalition (Note: Left the Berisha II Government on April 23, 2013)
2013	Ilir Meta	180,470	10.46	16 / 140	▲12	3rd	Coalition
2017	Petrit Vasili	225,901	14.28	19 / 140	▲3	3rd	Opposition
2021	Monika Kryemadhi	107,521	6.81	4 / 140	▼15	3rd	Opposition
2025	Ilir Meta	Part of ASHM	Part of ASHM	4 / 140	0	3rd	Opposition

== Leader of the party ==
Ilir Meta founded the party and remained Leader of the Party until 30 April 2017. On 28 April 2017 he was elected the 7th President of Albania and left the Party. Petrit Vasili, a prominent figure inside the party served as the party leader, until 29 June, resigning after the election results. Monika Kryemadhi, Meta's wife, was then voted in as party leader. Although she is the spouse of then-President Meta, she refused to take the honorific position of the First Lady of Albania, conceding the post to her oldest daughter. On 25 July 2022, Meta returned to the party as leader after his presidency had ended. Subsequently, the party's name was changed to the Freedom Party.

#	Chairman	Born–Died	Term start	Term end	Time in office
1	Ilir Meta	1969–	6 September 2004	5 May 2017	12 years, 241 days
2	Petrit Vasili	1958–	5 May 2017	5 July 2017	61 days
3	Monika Kryemadhi	1974–	5 July 2017	25 July 2022	5 years, 20 days
(1)	Ilir Meta	1969–	25 July 2022	present	4 years, 49 days
