= Izet Dibra =

Albanian politician

Izet Shatku (Dibra)

Izet Dibra (1878 – 1964) born Izet Shatku was an Albanian politician and mayor of Tirana from 1927 to 1928. He also served as minister of public works in Pandeli Evangjeli's cabinet. His brother Faik had served as attorney general and minister of justice.

== Life ==
Izet Dibra was born as Izet Shatku on May 19, 1878 in Debar, back then Ottoman Empire, today's North Macedonia. His father Murat Ibrahim Shatku was a local merchant and financier.

Shatku took his initial studies in his native town, and followed later in Monastir. Preceding the Balkan Wars, his family moved to Turkey. There he completed studies in the Istanbul University for jurisprudence before returning to Albania in 1920. After certain lower positions in the judicial system, he was elected shortly sub-prefect of Elbasan prefecture. With the new assembly constitution, he became assembly member representing the Dibër prefecture. Until 1930 he served in several prefectures. A pro-Zog politician, he was elected minister of public works in Pandeli Evangjeli's cabinet. 1n 1937 he was elected assembly member again.

After World War II, his properties and belongings would be confiscated and his family deported. He died in Shkodër in 11.02.1964.
