= Ilir Meta =

President of Albania from 2017 to 2022

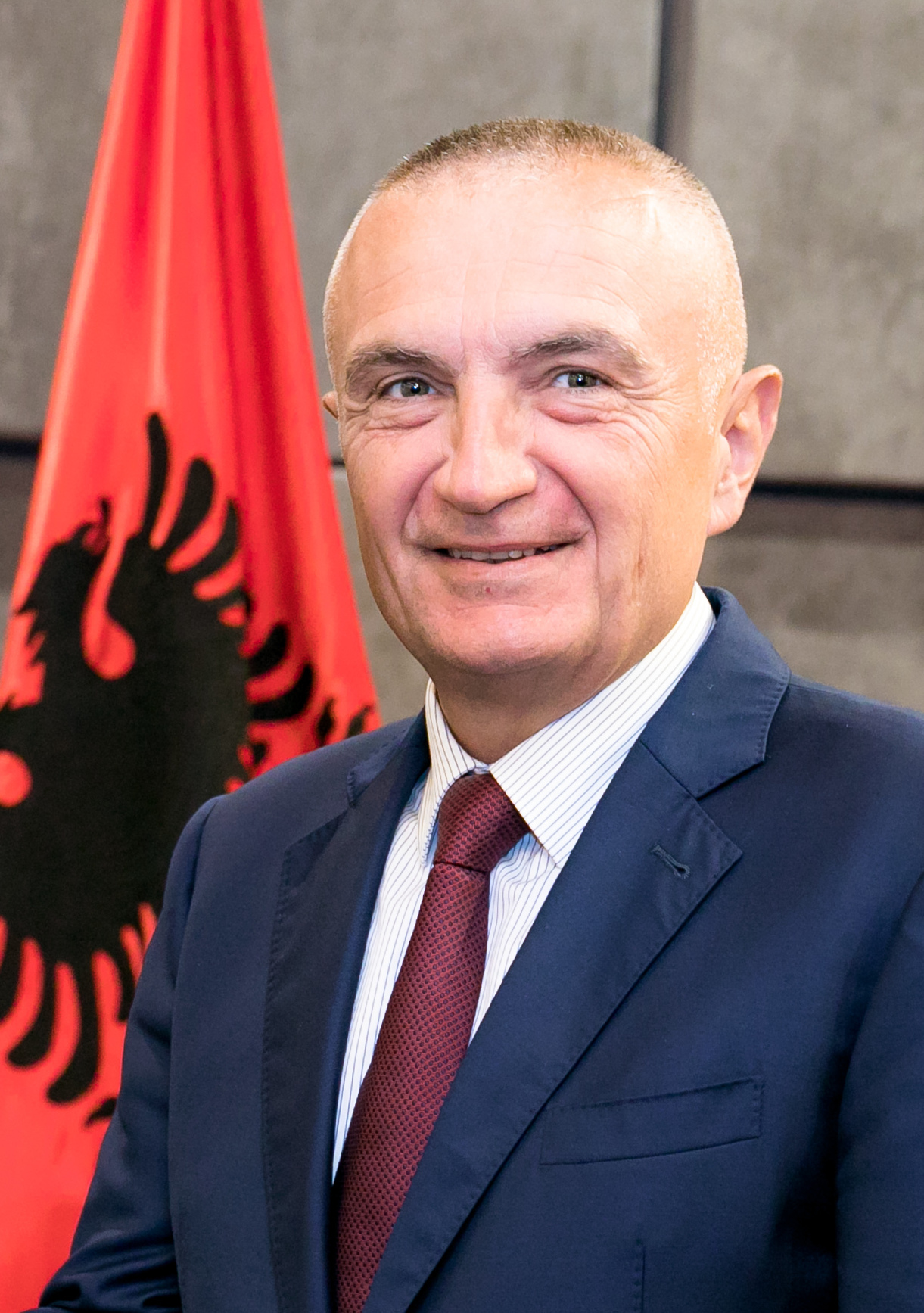
- Meta in 2018

President of Albania
- In office 24 July 2017 – 24 July 2022
- Prime Minister: Edi Rama
- Preceded by: Bujar Nishani
- Succeeded by: Bajram Begaj

Prime Minister of Albania
- In office 29 October 1999 – 29 January 2002
- President: Rexhep Meidani
- Preceded by: Pandeli Majko
- Succeeded by: Pandeli Majko

Speaker of the Parliament of Albania
- In office 10 September 2013 – 24 July 2017
- Preceded by: Jozefina Topalli
- Succeeded by: Valentina Leskaj (Acting)

47th Minister of Foreign Affairs
- In office 17 September 2009 – 17 September 2010
- Prime Minister: Sali Berisha
- Preceded by: Lulzim Basha
- Succeeded by: Edmond Haxhinasto
- In office 31 July 2002 – 18 July 2003
- Prime Minister: Fatos Nano
- Preceded by: Arta Dade
- Succeeded by: Luan Hajdaraga (Acting)

Personal details
- Born: Ilir Rexhep Meta; 24 March 1969 (age 57) Çorovodë, Skrapar, PR Albania
- Party: Freedom Party (2022–ongoing)
- Other political affiliations: Independent (2017–2022); Socialist Movement for Integration (2004–2017); Socialist Party (1990–2004)
- Spouse: Monika Kryemadhi (m. 1998; div. 2024)
- Children: 3

Ilir Rexhep Meta (Albanian pronunciation: [iliɾ meta]; born 24 March 1969) is an Albanian politician who served as President of Albania from 2017 to 2022.

Previously Meta served as Prime Minister from 1999 to 2002 and he was Speaker of the Parliament of Albania from 2013 to 2017. He also held positions as Deputy Prime Minister, Minister for Europe and Foreign Affairs and Minister of Economy, Trade, and Energy. Prior to that, he held the Chairmanship of the Parliamentary Commission of European Integration. He founded the Socialist Movement for Integration in 2004.

In October 2024 Meta was arrested after being charged with corruption and money laundering by Albania's Special Structure Against Corruption and Organised Crime (SPAK). He has been in detention since the arrest and is currently on trial.

== Life and career ==
=== 1969–2004: Beginnings and Prime Minister ===
Ilir Meta was born in Çepan, Skrapar. He graduated at the Faculty of Economics and Politics branch of the University of Tirana, where he also pursued his post-graduate studies.

Meta has been engaged in politics since 1990, after the fall of communism in Albania, as an active participant in the students' movement against one-party rule, which brought political pluralism in Albania. Since 1992 he has been elected Member of Parliament in all legislatures, and has been an active member of several Parliamentary Commissions. From 1996 to 1997 he was Deputy Chairman of the Foreign Affairs Commission of Parliament. From October 1998 to October 1999, Meta was Deputy Prime Minister and Minister of Coordination, as well as State Secretary for European Integration in the Ministry of Foreign Affairs in March–October 1998.

In 2004, Meta left the Socialist Party of Albania (PS) and founded his own party, the Socialist Movement for Integration (LSI). From 2004 to 2006, Meta was nominated as a member of the International Commission on the Balkans, chaired by the former Prime Minister of Italy, Giuliano Amato. The Commission drafted a series of important recommendations towards the integration of the Western Balkan countries into the European Union.

Meta became Prime Minister on 29 October 1999. At age 30 he was the second-youngest prime minister in Albanian history after Zog I, who was 27 at the time of his election in 1922. Following the 2001 parliamentary election, he initially remained Prime Minister. The President of Albania, Rexhep Meidani, approved the Government of Albania on 7 September 2001. Five days afterward, the government gave a vote of confidence to Meta's Cabinet. However, the formation of the new cabinet took almost three months. On 29 January 2002, Meta announced his resignation as Prime Minister due to party infighting between the Socialist Party leader Fatos Nano and himself. Pandeli Majko was elected Prime Minister on 22 February 2002.

During this period, Albania engaged in a range of important reforms, joining the Stabilisation and Association Process with the European Union.

=== 2009–2016: Deputy Prime Minister ===
In the 2009 parliamentary election, the Socialist Movement for Integration (LSI) won four seats in the Parliament of Albania, with 4.8% of the total vote. The party along with PSV91 became the determining parties to form the government coalition. On 16 September 2009, the LSI allied with the Democratic Party of Albania (PD) to form the government coalition.

With the formation of the new government led by Democratic Party chairman Sali Berisha, Meta became the Deputy Prime Minister and the Minister of Foreign Affairs at the same time. He was an early and vocal campaigner for the visa-free with the Schengen Area, which was accomplished in 2010. He remains one of the most vocal campaigners and advocates of regional and European integration for all countries of the Western Balkans, as a means to further strengthen stability and peace in the region.

In 2011, Meta served as the Minister of Economy, Trade, and Energy in the center-right government of Sali Berisha, whose Democratic Party of Albania the LSI joined after the 2009 parliamentary election.

In the run-up to the eighth multi-party elections held in 2013, Meta and the Socialist Movement for Integration (LSI) left the coalition with the Democratic Party (PD) established in 2009, to transfer over to the Socialist Party (PS). The result of the elections was a victory for the Alliance for a European Albania containing with LSI led by the PS and its leader, Edi Rama. On 10 September 2013, Parliament elected Meta as Chairman of Parliament by a vote of 91 to 45.

=== 2017–2022: Presidency ===
On 28 April 2017, Meta was elected President of the Republic of Albania at the fourth ballot with 87 votes out of 140. He took office on 24 July 2017. In the ceremony, he was accompanied solely by his children, as his wife Monika Kryemadhi refused the title of First Lady because of her political engagement as leader of the party her husband founded, with their daughter, Era Meta, serving as the de facto First Lady.

On 26 November 2019, an earthquake struck the Durrës region of Albania, killing 51 people, injuring 3,000 others, and damaging 11,000 buildings. In January 2020, Meta met with Israel Defense Forces soldiers in Israel, and thanked them for their assistance in earthquake relief efforts, awarding the Albanian Golden Medal of the Eagle to the soldiers' unit.

As was the case with his predecessor, during his term of office his main focus has been the European integration process of Albania and global challenges affecting Albania. Meta has underscored the willingness of Albanians to strengthen its bilateral strategic partnerships with all partner countries in the areas of security and NATO.

==== Impeachment by parliament ====
On 9 June 2021, Meta was impeached by the Albanian parliament for violating the constitution and discharged from the post of president. The parliament accused him of being biased and partisan during the April 2021 parliamentary elections, and of inciting violence and instability. The motion was put forward by the ruling Socialist Party of Albania and 104 MP's voted for his impeachment. On 16 February 2022 the Constitutional Court of Albania overturned the impeachment and ruled that the evidence against Meta did not amount to the a violation of the constitution. As such, Meta continued as President until the expiration of his term on 24 July 2022.

== Controversies ==
=== Videotaped bribe scandal ===
On 11 January 2011, the TV programme Fiks Fare on Top Channel broadcast a videotape recorded by hidden camera in the Ministry of Economy containing conversations between the Economy Minister Dritan Prifti, and then Deputy Prime Minister Ilir Meta. The videotape starts with Meta asking Prifti to intervene in a concession tender for the Egnatia-Shushicë hydropower plant in exchange for €700,000 and 7% of the shares. It then shows Meta requesting Prifti to award the auction for the sale of crude oil to Halilaj Holding Group in exchange for €1 million. Meta then continues by asking Prifti to hire activists from their party, the Socialist Movement for Integration (LSI) at the time now renamed Freedom Party (PL). The party was the junior government partner in the government of then Prime Minister Sali Berisha, and controlled the ministries of Economy, Foreign Affairs and Health.

Meta is overheard bragging that because he is on good terms with Chief Justice Shpresa Becaj, after having hired her daughter as a diplomat at an embassy he can influence the decision of the court. He then asks Prifti to keep the affair quiet because he is afraid the prosecutor’s office might open an investigation if it learns about it. This forced him to resign as deputy Prime Minister of Albania, even though he claimed innocence.

During the ensuing trial in the High Court, three Albanian experts appointed by the court – Ermal Beqiri, Ardian Pollo and Artur Rrahmani – testified that the video was not original, an interpretation that lent support to the defense of Meta against the corruption allegation. Earlier forensic analyses by British and American experts commissioned by the prosecution had concluded the recording was authentic, but the court ruled that analysis inadmissible. Dritan Prifti strongly disputed the local experts' conclusions, urging the court to request an independent expertise from the scientific police of one or more EU member states.

=== Sigurimi Informer ===
On 27 July 2022, the Albanian Authority for Information on Former State Security Documents (AIDSSH) forwarded to Parliament the identity of the high profile political figure referred to as "I.M." in the initial report.

Following our previous requests and proposals, but especially being encouraged by the most recent denunciation that came to the institution on the purity of the image of one of the highest personalities of the state, former president of the Republic, Ilir Metaj… it turns out that he actually appears in the documents created by the former State Intelligence Structure

— AIDSSH

Two former commissions were established to run background checks on politicians and their ties to the communist regime awarded Meta a "purity certificate". Meta also denied the claims and slammed the Authority for Information on Former State Security Documents, calling it the "Manipulations Authority".

=== Lobbying ===
Kronen Zeitung published an article in which Meta is accused of lobbying via a shell company, the article claims Meta paid $700,000 through a Cypriot shell company to gain access to the 2017 inauguration of Donald Trump. On 20 January 2017 Meta shared a photo of himself and SMI leader Petrit Vasili at social media during the inauguration of Donald Trump in Capitol, Washington, D.C.. Meta claims to have been invited by the Republican Party, but according to a US court documents, "$700,000 of a lawyer (who is) close to Meta went through the off shore company Dorelita Limited. Socialist Movement for Integration signed a contract with the alleged lawyer a few weeks prior the Inauguration.

=== Corruption charges and arrest ===
On 21 October 2024, Ilir Meta was arrested after an investigation was conducted by SPAK on suspicion of corruption, money laundering and non-declaration and concealrment of wealth. On 27 May 2025, he was formally charged with corruption, money laundering, tax evasion and hiding property from authorities. The criminal case also includes Monika Kryemadhi, his former wife. Prosecutors allege that Meta and Kryemadhi maintained a "corrupt relationship" with businessman Samir Mane, exchanging political favors, such changing mining regulations, for benefits such as a luxury villa worth 800.000 euros.

In April 2026, Meta sent a public letter to the Albanian Helsinki Committee alleging that his fundamental rights were being violated during his pre-trial detention at the Jordan Misja penitentiary. He claimed he was denied equal outdoor time, had not received official documentation for disciplinary measures, was prevented from effectively appealing decisions, and faced restrictions on publicly defending himself regarding his legal case.

== Personal life ==
Meta is a Bektashi Muslim, and adherent to traditional Bektashi values. He is fluent in Albanian, English and Italian. He is an ardent supporter of Celtic FC, often showing his passion for the club on social media. In July 2020, he founded the first Celtic Supporters Club in Albania.

Meta was married to Monika Kryemadhi from 1998 to June 2024, when they got divorced for personal and political reasons. They have two daughters and a son.

== Honours and awards ==
- Croatia:
  - Grand Cross of the Grand Order of King Tomislav (29 October 2019)
- Monaco:
  - Grand Cross of the Order of Saint-Charles (16 October 2019)

In March 2012, Meta received "Most Positive Personality for 2010 in Foreign Policy" award by International Institute "IFIMES" in Ljubljana, Slovenia. The award was presented to Meta by former President of Croatia, Stjepan Mesić, who was at the same time the Honorary President of "IFIMES".

Meta has also been honored by several cities and regions of Albania with the title "Honorary Citizen".

Political offices
Preceded by Pandeli Majko	Prime Minister of Albania; 1999–2002	Succeeded by Pandeli Majko
Preceded by Arta Dade	Minister of Foreign Affairs; 2002–2003	Succeeded by Luan Hajdaraga; Acting
Preceded by Lulzim Basha	Minister of Foreign Affairs; 2009–2010	Succeeded by Edmond Haxhinasto
Preceded by Jozefina Topalli	Speaker of Parliament; 2013–2017	Succeeded by Valentina Leskaj; Acting
Preceded by Bujar Nishani	President of Albania; 2017–2022	Succeeded by Bajram Begaj
