= List of Albanian rebels =

This is a list of Albanian rebels.

== Medieval era ==
- Andrea II Muzaka (1318-1372)
- Karl Thopia (1331-1388)
- Gjon Kastrioti (?-1439)
- Gjergj Arianiti (1383-1462)
- Gjergj Kastrioti (1405–1468)
- Gjon Kastrioti II (1456–1502)
- Ajdin Muzaka (–1444)
- Gjon Zenebishi (–1418)
- Depë Zenebishi (1379–1435)
- Theodor Bua (?–?)
- Mark Gjini (?-?)
- Pjetër Bua (1400's–?)

== Ottoman period ==
- Mihal Grameno (1871–1931)
- Bajo Topulli (1868–1930)
- Çerçiz Topulli (1880–1915)
- Zenel Gjoleka (1805–1852)
- Çelo Picari (1801–1880)
- Tafil Buzi (1792–1844)
- Dervish Cara (–1844)
- Mic Sokoli (1839–1881)
- Zhuj Selmani (1844–1875)
- Rrapo Hekali (–1875)
- Hodo Nivica (1809–1852)
- Hasan Prishtina (1873–1933)
- Menduh Zavalani (1889–1914)
- Ded Gjo Luli (1840–1915)
- Sokol Baci (1837–1920)
- Mehmet Shpendi (1851–1915)
- Luigj Gurakuqi (1879–1925)
- Pretash Zeka Ulaj (1882–1962)
- Tringe Smajli (1880–1917)

== Kachak movement ==
- Bajram Curri (1862–1925)
- Azem Galica (1889–1924)
- Qerime Shotë Galica (1895–1927)
- Zef Kol Ndoka (1883–1924)
- Hysni Curri (?–1925)
- Ajet Sopi Bllata (1861–1938)
- Agan Koja (1892–1929)
- Mehmet Pashë Deralla (1843–1918)
- Sali Butka (1852–1938)
- Osman Taka (1848–1887)
- Asllan Curri (?–1925)
- Idriz Seferi (1847–1927)
- Bajram Balota (?–?)
- Sadik Rama (1879–1944)
- Isa Boletini (1864–1916)
- Jusuf Mehoniqi (1883–1926)
- Elez Isufi (1861–1924)
- Qazim Begolli (?–?)
- Musa Demi (1878–1971)

== Partisan movement ==
- Asim Zeneli
- Koçi Bako
- Bardhok Biba
- Ali Demi
- Emin Duraku
- Ymer Dishnica
- Pirro Dodbiba
- Petrit Dume
- Llazar Fundo
- Mustafa Gjinishi
- Kadri Hazbiu
- Branko Kadia
- Jordan Misja
- Perlat Rexhepi
- Hysni Kapo
- Abdyl Këllezi
- Ali Kelmendi
- Bilbil Klosi
- Androkli Kostallari
- Vojo Kushi
- Pirro Kondi
- Baba Faja Martaneshi
- Myslim Peza
- Vasil Shanto
- Zef Mala
- Petro Marko
- Spiro Moisiu
- Misto Mame
- Haxhi Lleshi
- Foto Çami
- Prokop Murra
- Manush Myftiu
- Adil Çarçani
- Hito Çako
- Ramadan Çitaku
- Riza Dani
- Vito Kapo
- Liri Gega
- Naxhije Dume
- Liri Gero (1926–1944)
- Melpomeni Çobani
- Dhora Leka
- Ramize Gjebrea
- Nexhmije Hoxha
- Margarita Tutulani
- Liri Belishova
- Sofia Noti

== Ballist movement ==
- Skënder Muço (1904–1944)
- Vasil Andoni
- Hafëz Jusuf Azemi
- Bislim Bajgora
- Safet Butka
- Aziz Çami
- Gajur Deralla
- Muharrem Bajraktari
- Fiqri Dine
- Abas Ermenji
- Hasan Dosti
- Ndok Gjeloshi
- Xhem Hasa
- Rexhep Jusufi
- Kristo Kirka
- Ndue Përlleshi
- Mefail Shehu

== Yugoslav wars ==
- Adem Jashari (1955–1998)
- Tahir Meha (1943–1981)
- Hamëz Jashari (1950–1998)
- Zahir Pajaziti (1962–1997)
- Sali Çekaj (1956–1999)
- Bekim Berisha (1966–1998)
- Agim Ramadani (1963–1999)
- Ramush Haradinaj (1968–)
- Daut Haradinaj
- Fatmir Limaj (1971–)
- Ismet Asllani
- Agim Çeku (1960–)
- Hashim Thaçi (1968–)
- Fadil Nimani
- Ali Ahmeti
- Rahim Beqiri
- Tahir Sinani
- Skerdilajd Llagami
- Talat Xhaferi
- Njazi Azemi
- Haradin Bala
- Rrustem Berisha
- Lahi Brahimaj
- Indrit Cara
- Sylejman Sylejmani
- Bahri Fazliu
- Adem Grabovci
- Ismet Jashari
- Jakup Krasniqi
- Luan Haradinaj
- Naim Maloku
- Albesian Mataj
- Isak Musliu
- Selim Pacolli
- Anton Quni
- Salih Mustafa
- Jashar Salihu
- Sylejman Selimi
- Shkelzën Haradinaj
- Abdullah Tahiri
- Kadri Veseli
- Emin Xhinovci
- Tahir Zemaj
