= List of schools in Albania =

This is a list of schools in Albania.

== Schools in Durrës ==
- Gjergj Kastrioti High School
- Naim Frasheri High School
- Leonik Tomeu High School
- Dom Nikoll Kaçorri High School
- Olsi Lasko High School
- Benardina Qerraxhia Sports Mastery
- Hysen Çela Technological High School
- Beqir Çela Professional High School

=== Private Schools ===
- Arberia High School
- Aristoteli High School
- Arsakeio High School
- Celesi Magjik High School
- Don Bosko High School
- Drita e Diturise High School
- Ekonomisti High School
- Ernest Koliqi High School
- Eurolingua High School
- Eurovizion High School
- Faik Konica High School
- Flabina High School
- Gauss High School
- Guiness High School
- Harry Fultz High School
- Kristaq Rama High School
- Linz High School
- M.Akif.Djem High School
- M.Akif.Vajza High School
- Maria High School
- Medrese Mahmud Dashi High School
- Meridian+ High School
- Mesonjtorja High School
- Mist High School
- Mrekullia High School
- Nils Bor High School
- Njuton High School
- Nobel High School
- Qellimi i Jetes High School
- Rreze Drite High School
- Saadi High School
- Tirana Jone High School
- Turgut Özal College
- United Albania College
- Univers High School
- Wilson High School
- Wisdom High School

=== Private Schools ===
- Vinçens Prendushi Primary & High School
- Frymë Dashurie Primary & High School
- Mihal Ekonomi Primary & High School
- Iliria Primary & High School
- Kasa Primary & High School
- Konica Primary & High School
- Migjeni Primary & High School
- Pavaresia Primary & High School
- Rilindja High School
- Turgut Özal College
- Top School
- Albanian College Durres

== Schools in Elbasan ==
- Ahmet Dakli High School
- Anastas Çakalli High School
- Daskal Todri High School
- Kostandin Kristoforidhi High School
- Kostandin Shpataraku High School
- Luigj Gurakuqi High School
- Mahir Domi High School
- Miranda Baku High School
- Qamil Guranjaku Primary School
- Sami Frashëri High School
- Tomorr Sinani High School
- Vasil Kamami High School

=== Private Schools ===
- Inkus High School
- Liria High School
- Nikolla Koperniku High School

== Schools in Gjirokastër ==
- Asim Zeneli Gymnasium

== Schools in Himarë ==
- Acroceraunian School

== Schools in Kavajë ==
=== Elementary Level ===
- 3 Dëshmorët Primary School
- 11 Shkurti Primary School
- Agonas Primary School
- Beden Primary School
- Blerimaj Primary School
- Bregu i Përroit Primary School
- Çetë Primary School
- Cikallesh Primary School
- Dituria Primary School
- Dëshmorët e Shkodrës Primary School
- Fiqiri Kurti Primary School
- Golem Primary School
- Helmës Primary School
- Instituti i Minorenëve
- Kanaparaj Primary School
- Karpen Primary School
- Kryemdhej Primary School
- Kryezi Primary School
- Mehmet Babamusta Primary School
- Memzotaj Primary School
- Momël Primary School
- Qamil Xhani Primary School
- Qerret Primary School
- Razi Leka Primary School
- Rilindja Primary School
- Rrikaj Primary School
- Sadi Tatani Primary School
- Seferaj Primary School
- Shtodhër Primary School
- Visare Primary School

=== Higher Level ===
- Aleksandër Moisiu High School
- Luz i Vogël High School
- Synej High School
- 26 Marsi High School
- Charles Telford Ericson High School
- Hafiz Ali Korça High School
- Dituria High School
- Kërkuesit e Dijes High School

== Schools in Korçë ==
- Demir Progri Professional High School
- Faik Konica Linguistic High School
- Fan S. Noli Professional High School
- Isuf Gjata Professional High School
- Irakli Terova Professional High School
- Preca College
- Raqi Qirinxhi High School
- Tefta Tashko Koco Artistic High School

== Schools in Lezhë ==
- Hydajet Lezha High School

=== Private Schools ===
- At Shtjefen Gjeçov School
- Effata School
- Lezha Academic Center
- Rogacionistët High School

== Schools in Shkodër ==
- 28 Nëntori High School
- Scutari High School
- Jordan Misja High School
- Pjetër Meshkalla High School
- Hasan Riza Pasha College
- Shkolla Austriake "Peter Mahringer"

== Schools in Tiranë ==
- Abdulla Keta High School
- Aleks Buda High School
- Andon Zako Çajupi High School
- Arben Broci High School
- Asim Vokshi High School
- Ahmet Gashi High School
- Besnik Sykja High School
- Eqrem Çabej High School
- Gjergji Canco Technologic High School
- Harry Fultz Institute
- Hoteleri-Turizëm High School
- Ismail Qemali High School
- Jordan Misja Artistic Lyceum
- Kajtazi Brothers Educational Institute
- Karl Gega High School
- Koreografike High School
- Madrasa of Tirana
- Myslym Keta High School
- Partizani High School
- Petro Nini Luarasi High School
- Qemal Stafa High School
- Sami Frashëri High School
- Sandër Prosi High School
- Sinan Tafaj High School
- Sports Mastery School Loro Boriçi
- Teknike-Ekonomike High School
- Tirana International School
- Kostandin Kristoforidhi High School

== Schools in Vlora ==
- Ali Demi High School

== See also ==
- Education in Albania
- List of universities in Albania
- List of libraries in Albania
