= Ndrec Ndue Gjoka =

Albanian educator and People's Teacher (1919–1946)

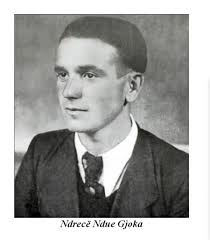
- Portrait of Ndrec Ndue Gjoka (circa 1940)
- Born: 1919; Bisak, Fan, Mirditë, Principality of Albania
- Died: 17 February 1946 (aged 26–27); Qafëvorres, Kaçinar, Fan, Mirditë, Republic of Albania
- Occupations: Educator, school administrator, resistance figure
- Known for: Expanding mass literacy; establishing 52 primary schools in Mirditë and Kosovo
- Awards: Mësues i Popullit (Teacher of the People); Mësues i Merituar (Merited Teacher, 1945); Dëshmor i Atdheut (Martyr of the Fatherland)

Ndrec Ndue Gjoka (1919 – 17 February 1946) was an Albanian educator, school organiser, and anti‑illiteracy activist. He is remembered for opening 52 primary schools and 47 literacy courses in the remote highlands of Mirditë and Kosovo after World War II, dramatically expanding access to secular education. He was posthumously awarded the titles Mësues i Popullit ("Teacher of the People") and Dëshmor i Atdheut ("Martyr of the Fatherland").

== Early life and education ==
Ndrec Ndue Gjoka was born in 1919 in the village of Bisak, in the Fan region of Mirditë, into a poor peasant family. At age seven, he entered the boarding school dormitory in Orosh, the region's only educational institution at the time. Teachers soon noticed his intelligence, particularly in arithmetic and writing. With their encouragement, he enrolled at the Shkolla Normale e Elbasanit (Elbasan Normal School), the country's premier teacher‑training institution, then directed by the patriot and scholar Aleksandër Xhuvani. At the Normal School, Ndrec Ndue Gjoka became an active member of the patriotic society "Naim Frashëri". He graduated as a certified teacher in 1939.

== Teaching career in Kosovo and imprisonment by Italian fascists ==
In 1940, Ndrec Ndue Gjoka had a brief first posting in Linaj, Shkodër. The following year, the Albanian Ministry of Education under Minister Ernest Koliqi sent him to teach in Albanian‑populated areas of Kosovo. In 1941, he was assigned to the historic stone school in Zllakuqan, Istog municipality – a village where Shtjefën Gjeçovi had opened the first Albanian school in 1897. Ndrec Ndue Gjoka quickly became a beloved figure, teaching literacy, national history, and patriotic songs, accompanying himself on the çifteli. His classes grew to over 100 pupils, and he hired local assistants such as Zef Pernoka.

His openly nationalist educational work drew the hostility of the Italian fascist authorities. While teaching in front of his students, he was arrested. He was first taken to Italian commands in Pejë, then transferred to a secure prison in Shkodër. He successfully escaped on 27 October 1944 and was sheltered by local highlanders in the mountains of Mirditë, continuing his clandestine teaching without interruption.

== Return to Mirditë and post‑war school expansion ==
After his escape and following the liberation of Mirditë district on 26 October 1944, Ndrec Ndue Gjoka was appointed head of education (përgjegjës i seksionit të arsimit) for the Mirditë district. He collaborated closely with partisan units and resistance figure Bardhok Biba. At the time, the region had only 201 pupils in a handful of schools, and about 90% of the population was illiterate.

On 13 December 1944, Ndrec Ndue Gjoka initiated a formal resolution through the district's National Liberation Council to launch an emergency mass literacy campaign. Lacking state funds, textbooks, or dedicated school buildings, he traveled from village to village, persuading families to lend rooms in their stone towers (kulla) for classrooms. He recruited literate youth and former Orosh boarding school students, providing them with accelerated pedagogical training. Within three months, his initiatives had established:

- 52 new primary schools across Mirditë, Shkodër, and parts of Kosovo.
- 47 intensive literacy courses for adults.

Total student enrollment soared from 201 to 2,641 students. Crucially, the campaign marked the first time in the region's history that young girls and women were formally enrolled in institutional education.

Beyond his educational duties, Ndrec Ndue Gjoka served on the leadership committee of the Democratic Front of Mirditë and actively led regional blood feud reconciliation commissions. According to historical records, he publicly forgave the blood feud associated with his own brother's murder to promote community unity.

== Assassination ==
Ndrec Ndue Gjoka's campaign for secular state education encountered fierce resistance from armed anti‑communist paramilitary groups and conservative traditionalist factions. On 17 February 1946, while travelling through the Qafëvorres pass near Kaçinar (Fan region) to inspect a local school, he was ambushed and assassinated. At the time of his death, he was carrying a bag of school supplies – books, notebooks, and chalk – for his pupils. He was 27 years old.

The murder is officially attributed to "reactionary bands" (former Axis collaborators and anti‑communist irregulars). However, according to post-communist era accounts and testimonies collected in the 1990s, Ndrec Ndue Gjoka was killed on the orders of Aleksandar Ranković, the Yugoslav communist chief of security, acting through Albanian operatives within the Yugoslav intelligence network. These sources claim that Ranković specifically targeted Gjoka for his role in expanding Albanian-language education and fostering national consciousness in Kosovo and northern Albania.

== Awards and decorations ==
=== Mësues i Merituar (Merited Teacher) ===
On 23 September 1945, Ndrec Ndue Gjoka was awarded the title "Mësues i Merituar" (Merited Teacher) by the Albanian Ministry of Education for his extraordinary work in opening 52 primary schools and 47 literacy courses in Mirditë within three months, raising student enrollment from 201 to 2,641.

=== Mësues i Popullit (Teacher of the People) ===
Posthumously, Ndrec Ndue Gjoka was awarded the highest pedagogical honor in Albania, "Mësues i Popullit" (Teacher of the People), in recognition of his lifelong dedication to spreading literacy and secular education in the remote highlands of Mirditë and Kosovo, even under Axis occupation and after his escape from fascist imprisonment.

=== Dëshmor i Atdheut (Martyr of the Fatherland) ===
Following his assassination on 17 February 1946 while carrying school supplies to his pupils, Gjoka was declared a "Dëshmor i Atdheut" (Martyr of the Fatherland) by Albanian state authorities for sacrificing his life in the line of duty as an educator and for his resistance against fascist occupation and anti-communist forces.

== Legacy ==
Ndrec Ndue Gjoka's life and work inspired the 1966 Albanian feature film Komisari i Dritës ("The Commissar of Light"), directed by Dhimitër Anagnosti and Viktor Gjika, with music by Tish Daija. The film premiered on 16 July 1966 in Rrëshen.

Several educational institutions were named after him, most notably the "Ndrec Ndue Gjoka" Pedagogical High School in Tirana (now defunct) and a unified secondary school in Fan, Mirditë. Ndrec Ndue Gjoka's legacy was further honoured in 1973 when the distinguished singer Xhevdet Hafizi recorded a song in his praise. His inclusion in the 1978 government publication *New Albania* under the heading "People's Teacher" confirms his formal recognition as a national pedagogical figure.

== See also ==
- Education in Albania
- Komisari i Dritës
- Bardhok Biba
