= Zef Mala =

Albanian writer (1915–1979)

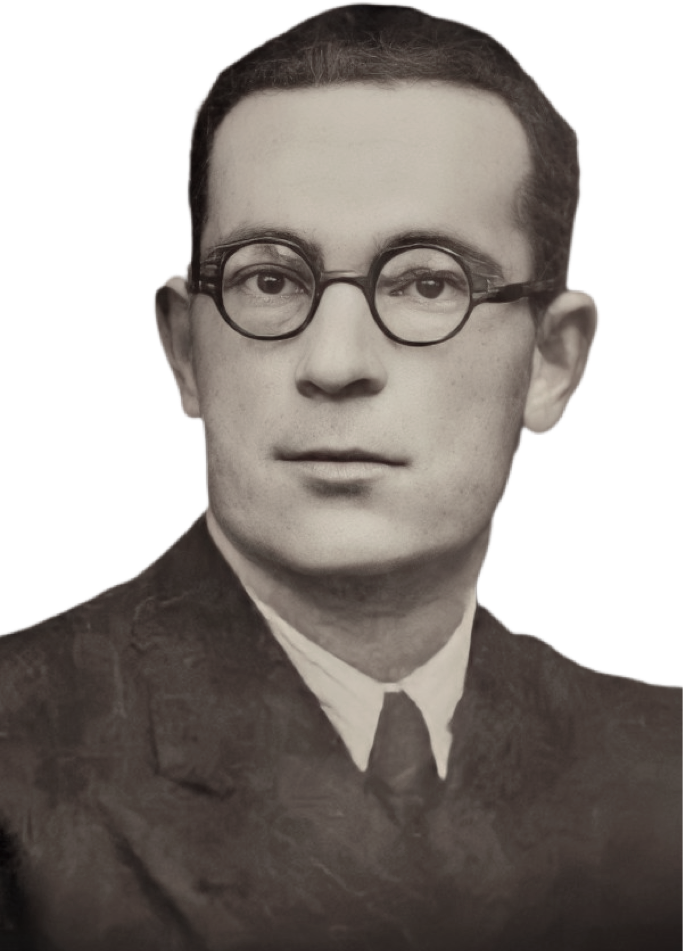
- As a student in Vienna, 1934
- Born: April 14, 1915; Shkodër, Principality of Albania
- Died: December 31, 1979 (aged 64); Tirana, PSRA
- Occupations: Esseyist, publicist, writer
- Known for: Leader of the Communist Group of Shkodër

Zef Mala (Shkodër, April 14, 1915 – Tirana, December 31, 1979) was an Albanian publicist and early communist. He was the leader of the Communist Group of Shkodër.

== Life ==
Mala was born in the "Skënderbeg" neighborhood of Shkodër, the son of Roman Catholics Gjon and Shaqe Mala. The family took the last name from a great-grandfather named Mal Jaku, who came from the Pepaj clan of the Plan village of Pult.

In 1933, he graduated from the Saverian College of Shkoder. In 1934, he settled in Tirana, where he wrote articles in the Besa newspaper, in a dedicated section for essays on "Life of great writers" (Albanian: Jetë shkrimtarësh të mëdhenj). Mala won a scholarship from Zog's government and went to study in the Faculty of Philosophy of the University of Vienna.

Mala was a co-founder and leader of the Communist Group of Shkodër. In February 1939, a special court sat in Tirana in judgement of 73 people, including Mala, suspected of communist activities and spreading propaganda. Among the accused were Tuk Jakova, Vasil Shanto, Vojo Kushi, Branko Kadia, Emin Duraku, and Qemal Stafa. Mala was imprisoned but benefited from the Italian invasion of Albania, escaping on its eve, on 6 April 1939, together with Vasil Shanto. The same Italians would arrest him soon after for his involvement in anti-Fascist activity, and he was sent to the Santo Stefano Island internment camp in Italy during 1940–43. In the summer of 1943 he was brought back to Tirana for his case to be reprocessed in court. Condemned to 15 years of jail, he managed to escape from the prison and spent time hiding in his uncles' houses in Tirana.

Communist leader Enver Hoxha showed no sympathy for him, and had already secretly instructed Nako Spiru on 4 April 1944 to silently execute him, as being "not a good one". Luckily Mala escaped execution this time. Hoxha would later refer to Mala as a "confusing anti-Marxist".

In 1945 he went to Italy where he was treated for his severe loss of vision. In 1946, Mala returned to Albania and started working in the National Library.

As an opponent of any dictatorship and Stalinism and being considered a Trotskyist or Orthodox Marxist, he would become a target of the new Albanian communist leadership. Mala was arrested in 1945 accused of being an opponent the Yugoslav-Albanian relationship and the banning of political pluralism. He would be released soon after the demise of Koçi Xoxe, but would be arrested again, serving three jail sentences (a total of 60 years) until his death in 1979 inside the hospital-prison in Tirana.

Disappointed by the communist regime and the fact that he had contributed to it, Mala was one of the few communists to give a public apology:

"We, who contributed to spreading this black cholera which gave birth to mourning, tears, blood, and poison inside the hearts of these long-suffered people, are the ones who should kneel, and open-kindheartedly ask for forgiveness"

— Zef Mala
