= Mustafa Gjinishi =

Albanian communist resistance member (1912–1944)

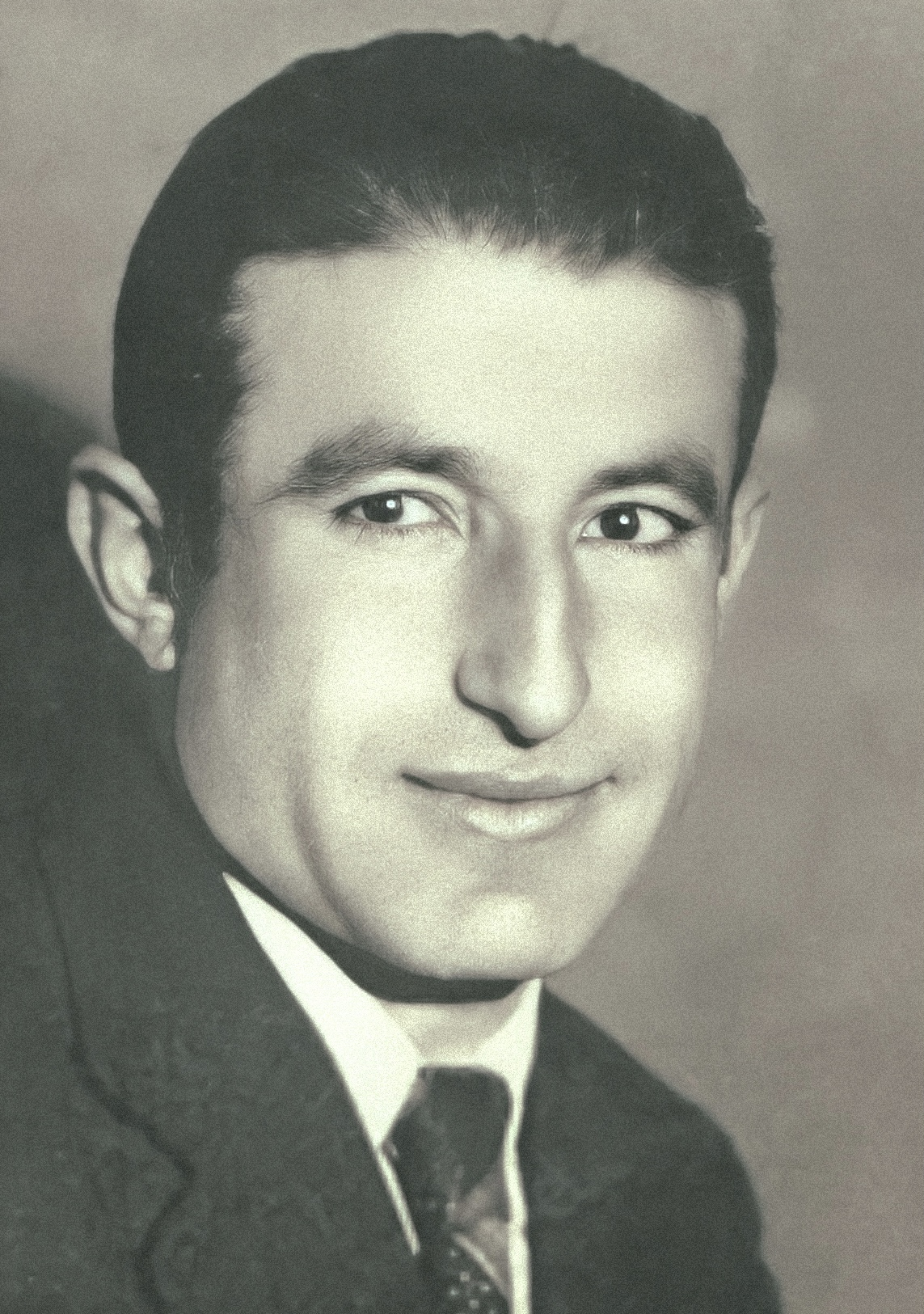
- Born: 15 January 1912; Peqin, Ottoman Empire (modern Albania)
- Died: 23 August 1944 (aged 32); Sllatinë, Kingdom of Albania
- Cause of death: Assassination by Liri Gega and Ndreko Rino at the behest of Miladin Popović and Enver Hoxha
- Political party: PKSH
- Father: Adem Gjinishi

Mustafa Gjinishi (15 January 1912 – 23 August 1944) was an Albanian communist from Peqin, central Albania. He was known for having opposed Enver Hoxha and the Italian invasion of Albania.

Mustafa Gjinishi was a known figure fighting for Albanian progress and a defender of tradition, nationality and democracy. His father, Adem Gjinishi, participated in the Albanian declaration of independence and was also a delegate in the 1920s Congress of Lushnje. He was murdered by Shefqet Verlaci in 1923 and this had a deep impact on Mustafa's life.

He studied in the American School of Technology in Tirana in 1924–1930. The principal Harris Fultz valued Gjinishi due to his excellent grades, but also his character, knowledge and his multilingual abilities. Gjinishi spoke English, German, French and Italian. Gjinishi was the first to translate the Lahuta e Malcis to English and he helped publish the first Albanian science newspaper "Shekulli XX" where he quoted Midhat Frasheri, Skender Luarasi, Tajar Zavalani and others. He was arrested for having brought communist literature to the country during Zogs reign. Gjinishi was sentenced to death by the anti-Zogist demonstrations. His sentence was however commuted to life in prison. He escaped during the Italian invasion of 1939, and organized antifascist demonstrations in Tirana and Kavaja before fleeing to Yugoslavia.

In 1941 he returned to Albania and associated with the Korca communist group. In September 1942, he participated in the Conference of Peza where he was elected as general secretary of the new LANC. In August 1943, he and Ymer Dishnica represented communist forces at the Mukja Agreement that was subsequently denounced by Enver Hoxha. British military figure Peter Kemp, who met Gjinishi in 1943, described him as "witty, highly intelligent and incorruptibly honest and as a man who commanded the affection and respect of all his countrymen of whatever political complexion". Although a leading communist and a political adjutant of Myslym Peza, he was willing to collaborate with the British and maintained cordial relations with his former foes, the anticommunist fighters Abaz Kupi and Gani bey Kryeziu. He was also seen as a rival to Enver Hoxha and it was this, more than anything else, that caused him to be dismissed in subsequent communist historiography as an agent of the English and a traitor to the communist cause.

He was murdered in late August 1944 after an ambush near the village of Greva in the district of Dibra while traveling with the British Major Victor Smith and an armed guard, apparently killed by Liri Gega and Ndreko Rino at the behest of Miladin Popović and Enver Hoxha. His body was buried, dug up and reburied several times.

== Theories ==
According to Owen Pearson, in his Albania in the Twentieth Century, A History: Volume II: Albania in Occupation and War, 1939–45, Gjinishi was murdered while on his way to the meeting of Mukaj by a terrorist named Varov. His death occurred during mysterious circumstances as he traveled in northern Albania. The communists however, after his death, officially declared suffering "a loss", sympathizing and canonizing Gjinishi while in fact it had been Enver Hoxha who had ordered his death, executed by Liri Gega.
