= Ndue =

- Gender: Male

Origin
- Origin: Antonius
- Region of origin: Albania, Kosovo

Other names
- Related names: Andon, Ndoj, Anthony

Ndue is an Albanian masculine given name and may refer to:

- Ndue Marashi (1933–1975), Albanian politician, former mayor of Tirana
- Ndue Mujeci (born 1993), Albanian footballer
- Ndue Paluca (born 1966), Albanian politician
- Ndue Përlleshi (1908–1949), Kosovar-Albanian military leader, local and national hero
- Ndue Ukaj (born 1977). Albanian writer, publicist, literary critic and literary theorist
