= Topulli =

Topulli is a surname of Albanian origin. Notable people with the surname include:

- Bajo Topulli (1868–1930), Albanian nationalist politician and revolutionary
- Çerçiz Topulli (1880–1915), Albanian revolutionary and guerrilla fighter

== See also ==
- Çerçiz Topulli Square, town square in Gjirokastër, Albania
