= Tutulani =

Tutulani is a surname. Notable people with the surname include:

- Dhimitër Tutulani (1857–1937), Albanian lawyer
- Margarita Tutulani (1925–1943), Albanian anti-fascist
