= Igli Cara =

Albanian politician

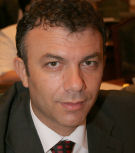

Member of the Albanian parliament
- Married
- In office 2009–2017

Personal details
- Born: 16 March 1969 Durrës, Albania
- Party: Democratic Party
- Children: 2

Igli Cara Is an Albanian politician in the city of Durrës and a candidate for mayor of Durrës.

== Early life ==
Igli Cara was born in Durrës on 16 March 1969. He graduated from "Naim Frashëri" secondary school in Durrës and then continued his higher studies in Tirana, in the Biochemistry branch, at the Faculty of Natural Sciences, during the years 1987-1992. After completing the university cycle of studies, Cara worked for a short period of time as a teacher. With the establishment of the structure of the Financial Police, He at the time was entrusted with the task of group manager, near the Anti-Smuggling Sector, for about two years. In the period 1994 - 2009, he developed the activity in the private sector at a Customs Agency.

== Political career ==
Cara was elected Chairman of the Association of Customs Agents, a position he held for several years. In the period 2005-2009, he was elected a Member of the Assembly and Presidency of the Durrës Chamber of Commerce and Industry. In 2007, he was elected a member of the Durrës City Council from the list of the Democratic Party, and at the same time, the Chairman of the Housing Committee. He exercised these functions until 2009, when he was elected Chairman of the Durrës Democratic Party Branch. In June 2009, he was elected a Deputy in the Parliament of Albania and Secretary of the Economy and Finance Committee. He was re-elected deputy during the period 2013-2017, holding the position of a member of the Economy and Finance Committee. After this period, he returned to the private sector, being active in political life again, as a Member of the National Council of the Democratic Party. In 2021, he was part of the list of deputies of the Democratic Party for the Durrës District. In 2022, he was re-elected to the position of Chairman of the Democratic Party, Dega Durrës. In December of the same year, he resigned after being selected as a candidate for Mayor of Durrës. His connection with the Democratic Party dates back to its creation. In the 90s, he joined the Student Movement, which escalated with the Hunger Strike of the students of the University of Tirana, where Mr. Cara also participated. Throughout his professional and political activity, he has shown a high degree of integrity and dedication in all the functions he has exercised. Igli Cara is married, has two children and has closely linked his life with Durrës, his hometown. On December 4, 2022 he would win the primary of the Democratic Party to run as Mayor of Durrës which he had won in a landslide over Armand Dervishi. Cara had received 1398 votes out of 1697.
