= Qemal Stafa =

Hero of Albania (1920–1942)

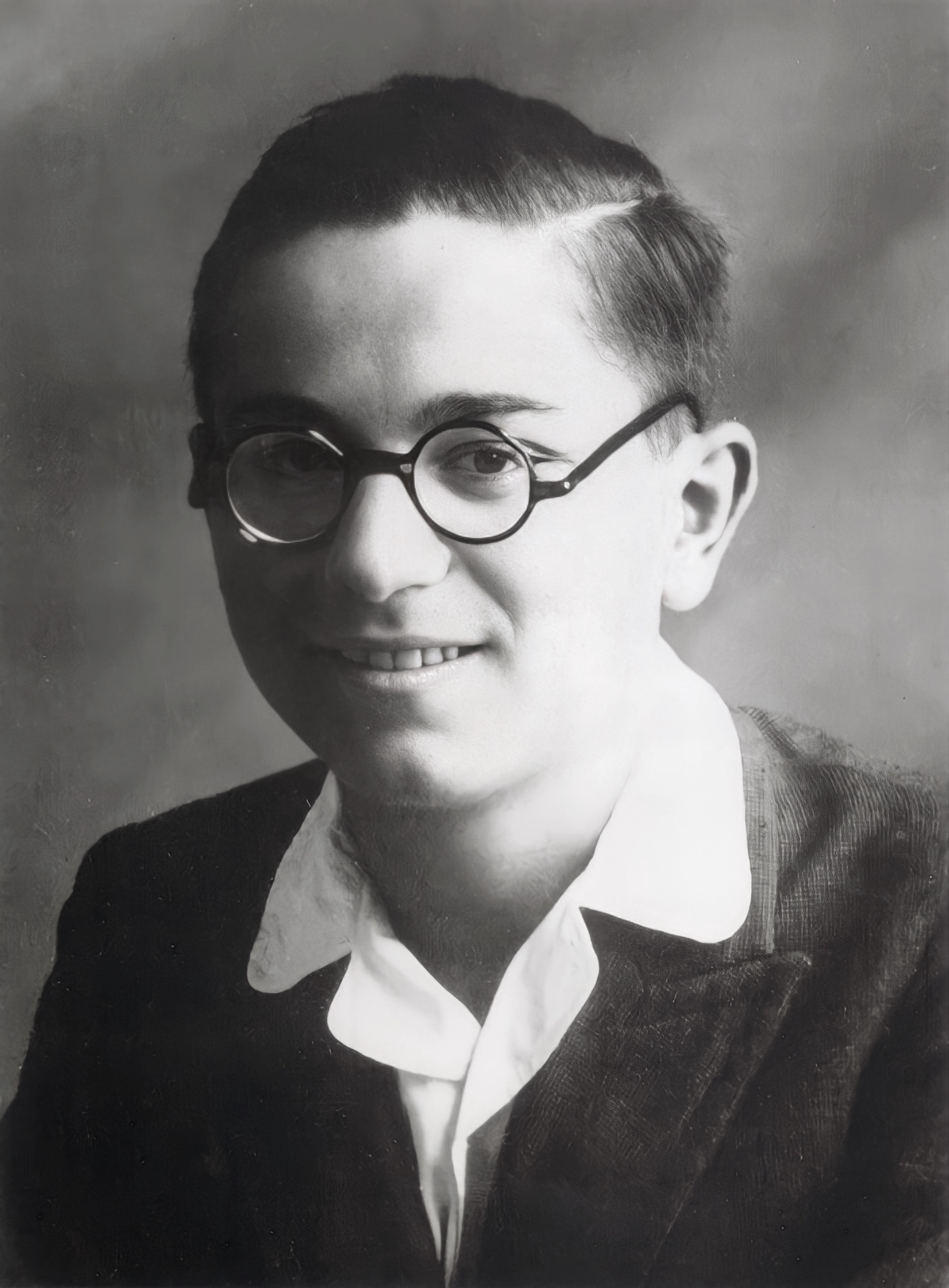
- Stafa in 1941
- Born: 20 March 1920; Elbasan, Principality of Albania
- Died: 5 May 1942 (age 22); Tirana, Italian-occupied Albania
- Cause of death: Assassinated
- Other name: Brutus
- Known for: Founding member of the Albanian Communist Party
- Parent: Hasan Stafa (Father)
- Awards: Hero of the People

Qemal Stafa (20 March 1920 – 5 May 1942) was an Albanian politician and one of the founding members of the Albanian Communist Party, and the leader of its youth section.

== Biography ==
Stafa was born in Elbasan in 1920, into a Gheg Albanian family originating from Zabzun village, which was part of the Dibra Region at the time. His father Hasan was in the military, and moved in 1923 to Shkodër as Director of the Recruiting Office for the Prefecture of Shkodër. Qemal Stafa studied in Shkodër at the Saverian College. With the educational reforms established by the Minister Mirash Ivanaj, private schools were closed and Stafa moved to the public high school of Shkodër. After the death of his father in 1936, his family moved to Tirana, where he studied at the Tirana Lyceum (subsequently named Qemal Stafa High School). He was one of the co-founders of the Communist Group of Shkodër, one out of three groups that would join in 1941 to form the Communist Party of Albania. In February 1939, a special court sat in Tirana against 73 people suspected for performing communist activities and propaganda. Among others there were, Tuk Jakova, Vasil Shanto, Vojo Kushi, Branko Kadia, Zef Mala, Emin Duraku and the young Stafa who was arrested on 24 January. He was sentenced to three years due to his age, while he accepted all accusations. With the turmoils of the Italian invasion of Albania of 7 April 1939, he was released from jail. Stafa spent some time in Florence as a law student, on a scholarship from the Albanian government.

Stafa was one of the founding members of the Albanian Communist Party in Tirana on 8 November 1941. He was killed in a house on the outskirts of Tirana by the Italian fascist forces, who had occupied Albania. May 5th, the anniversary of his death, was chosen after the end of the war as the Martyrs' Day of Albania to commemorate all those who gave their lives for Albania's liberation.

Many streets, squares and schools in different cities bear his name as well as a military base, Albania's former national stadium and the Main Stand in the current national stadium, Arena Kombëtare.
