= Karl Gurakuqi =

Albanian academic

- Born: March 24, 1895; Shkodër, Albania
- Died: December 6, 1971 (aged 76); Palermo, Italy
- Education: Pjetër Meshkalla High School; University of Graz
- Occupations: Linguist, folklorist

Karl Gurakuqi (24 March 1895 – 6 December 1971) was an Albanian linguist and folklorist.

== Life ==
Born in Shkodër in 1895 he first studied in the Jesuit Saverian College of Shkodër and later Salzburg. In the mid 1910s he graduated from the faculty of humanities of the University of Graz. In 1921 in Vlorë, he was elected general secretary of the Fatherland Federation, a democratic organization led by Avni Rustemi. Later he worked as a professor of Albanian and Latin in the Queen Mother Pedagogical Institute in Tirana. From 1940 to 1944 he was a member of the Institute of Albanian Studies, the predecessor of the Academy of Sciences of Albania. As a member of the institute in 1941 he became one of the editor of a two-volume anthology of Albanian literature. After World War II he co-wrote the Albanian-German Dictionary of the Austrian Academy of Sciences. From the 1950s to his death in 1971 he worked as a professor of Albanian studies in the University of Palermo, Italy. He died in Palermo in 1971.
