= Bardhok Biba =

Albanian politician (1920–1949)

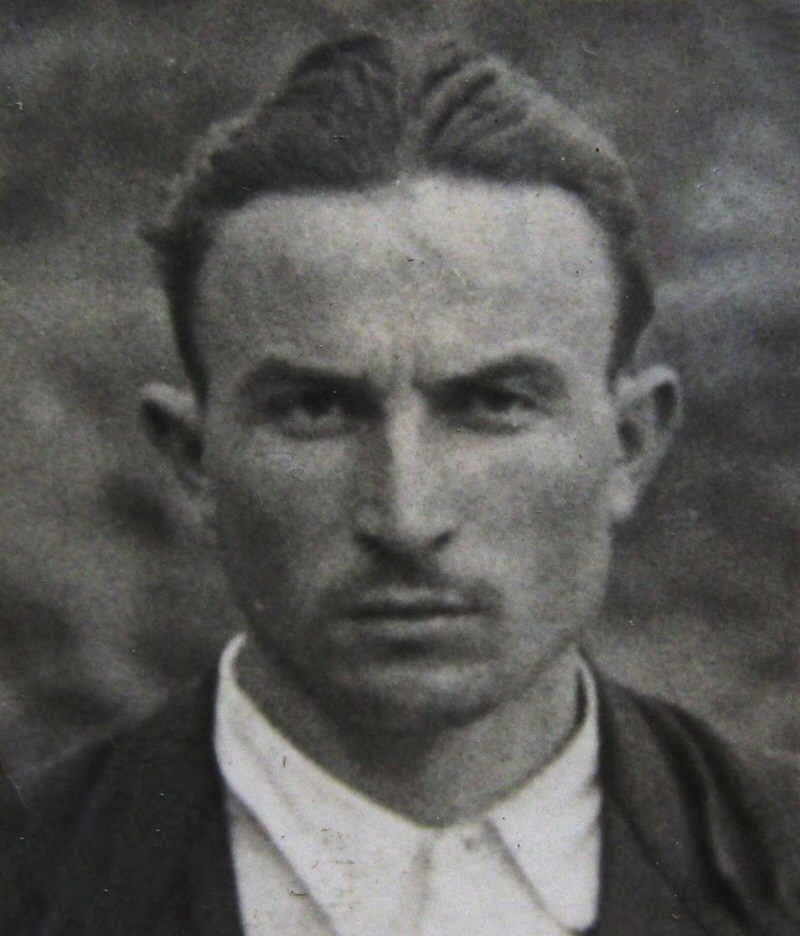
- Biba in 1944
- Born: 28 January 1920; Shkodër, Principality of Albania
- Died: 7 August 1949 (age 29); Prroska e Mirë, Mirditë, PR Albania
- Cause of death: Assassinated
- Known for: Member of the People's Assembly
- Awards: Hero of the People

Bardhok Biba (January 28, 1920 – August 7, 1949) was an Albanian politician who was a key political figure of the Mirditë region serving as political secretary of the party committee in the district. Biba was also a member of the People's Assembly. He was awarded the title of Hero of the People.

== Life ==
He was born in Shkodër on 28 January 1920. During his elementary school years he was in a boarding school in Orosh. He later completed his high school education in Shkodra. Bardhok was part of the Markolaj branch of the wider Gjonmarkaj tribe of Mirdita.

=== Activity ===
He came in Shkodra into contact with Emin Duraku, Branko Kadia, Jordan Misja and Perlat Rexhepi, Sadik Bekteshi, Hajdar Dushi, Xheladin Hana from Kosovo, Nazmi Rushiti, Tom Kola and other communist activists. He was influenced by these men and their ideas and attitudes, and ended up being excluded from school and accompanied by the military police to Orosh. His house would be burned and his father killed by anti-communists during the war. He lived underground for sometime until he was drawn into the war, first in the southern part and later as Commissar in Pukë, and Mirdita regions, teaching and spreading communist propaganda. After the liberation, he was elected member of the National Assembly of Mirdita in 1947. On December 23, 1948, he was appointed Political Secretary of the Communist for the Mirditë District. During this period he dealt extensively with the problems facing the poverty and educational system in the region. He bought this to the attention of the government, and contributed in establishing a platform for forgiveness of over 500 blood feuds, including his brother's (executed during the war). Bardhok Biba takes credit for opening over 50 schools in the region; the existing ones that time were only 6 with 300 pupils.

=== Assassination ===
Exactly in one of the tasks in the area and Kaçinar in Orosh, he was pinpointed to get killed by the Committee of the Mountains (Albanian: Komiteti i Maleve), one of the anti-communist paramilitary group led by former clan leaders and bajraktars, the most prominent belonging to Gjon Markagjoni clan. He was ambushed in an area called "Qafë-Valmiri" and was shot twice. The body was found with a small note in the vicinity, crediting the execution to the Mountains Committee. The real executors were never found, but voices point to close relatives of Markagjoni which were non-very distant relatives of Bardhok as well.
The reaction from the Communist side was strong and harsh. On August 9, 1949, just two days after the assassination of Bardhok, People's Protection Brigade located in Qafë-Shtamë deployed a fierce operation in Mirdita under the command of Colonel Zija Kambo and Mehdi Bilbili, arresting about 300 people. About 300 families were gathered together and displaced in internment campus in Tepelena. 29 persons were proceeded in court, the prosecution side asking death penalty for 20 of them, out of which 14 were executed. On August 17, the following persons were executed:

1. Preng Ded Kola, from Orosh, hanging.
2. Pjetër D. Vila, from Kaçinar, hanging.
3. Dodë Mark Biba, from Kthellë e Epërme, hanging
4. Pjetër Paloka, from Kaçinar, hanging
5. Nikollë Bardhok Bajraktari, from Rrëshen, shooting
6. Llesh Gjon Melyshi, from Malaj, shooting
7. Nikoll Llesh Bajraktari, from Orosh, shooting
8. Ndrecë Mark Ndoj, from Kaçinar, shooting
9. Bardhok Dodë Gjini, from Prosek, shooting
10. Gjok Gjin Kaçi, from Bukmirë, shooting
11. Gjergj Beleshi, from Kthellë e Epërme, (as a replacement for his fugitive brother Doda)
12. Ndoc Gjet Cupi, from Blinisht, shooting
13. Preng Shkurt Nikolli, from Orosh, shooting
14. Frrok Mata, from Kaçinar, shooting

== Legacy ==
Bardhok Biba would be held as the symbol of Mirdita for around 40 years, until after the Fall of communism in Albania, his monument together with the one of Pal Mëlyshi and other communist figures would be removed. The Albanian movie Commissar of Light (Albanian: Komisari i Dritës), directed by Dhimitër Anagnosti, was partly dedicated to Bardhok Biba. His contribution to the economic and social development of the region, and especially his successful efforts in resolving blood feuds, were re-brought into attention by Rrëshen local government, awarding him "Honorary Citizen" of the town in 2012. Biba is considered the founder of the Rrëshen municipality, transforming it from a village into an administrative center.

== See also ==
- Communism in Albania
