= Andon (name) =

- Gender: Male
- Name day: 17 July (Bulgaria)

Origin
- Region of origin: Albania, Bulgaria, North Macedonia

Other names
- Related names: Anthony, Anton, Ndue

Andon is both a masculine given name and surname; a variant of Anton, found in Albania, Bulgaria, North Macedonia and among Armenians from Western Armenia. It is also found as a surname. Notable people with this name include the following:

== Given name ==
- Andon Çelebi (1604–1674), Armenian merchant magnate, Ottoman and Tuscan official
- Andon Amaraich (1932–2010), Micronesian public servant, politician, diplomat and judge
- Andon Beça (1879–1977), Albanian politician
- Andon Bedros IX Hassoun (1809–1884), Armenian Patriarch of Cilicia and archbishop of Constantinople of the Armenians
- Andon Boshkovski (1974-2022), Macedonian handball coach
- Andon Zako Çajupi (1866–1930), Albanian nationalist activist, poet and playwright
- Andon Dimitrov (1867–1933), Bulgarian revolutionary
- Andon Dončevski (born 1935), Yugoslav-Macedonian football player and coach
- Andon Gushterov (born 1990), Bulgarian footballer
- Andon Kalchev (1910–1948), Bulgarian scientist, army officer and nationalist
- Andon Kyoseto (1855–1953), Bulgarian revolutionary and nationalist
- Andon Nikolov (born 1951), Bulgarian weightlifter
- Andon Petrov (born 1955), Bulgarian former cyclist
- Andon Qesari (1942–2021), Albanian actor and film director
- Andon Zlatarev (1872–1902), Bulgarian revolutionary

== Surname ==
- Alec Andon (Alec Monopoly) (born 1986), American street artist and DJ
- Joe Andon, Australian businessperson
- Laura Andon, Australian model
