= Hero of Socialist Labour (Albania) =

Albanian honorary title

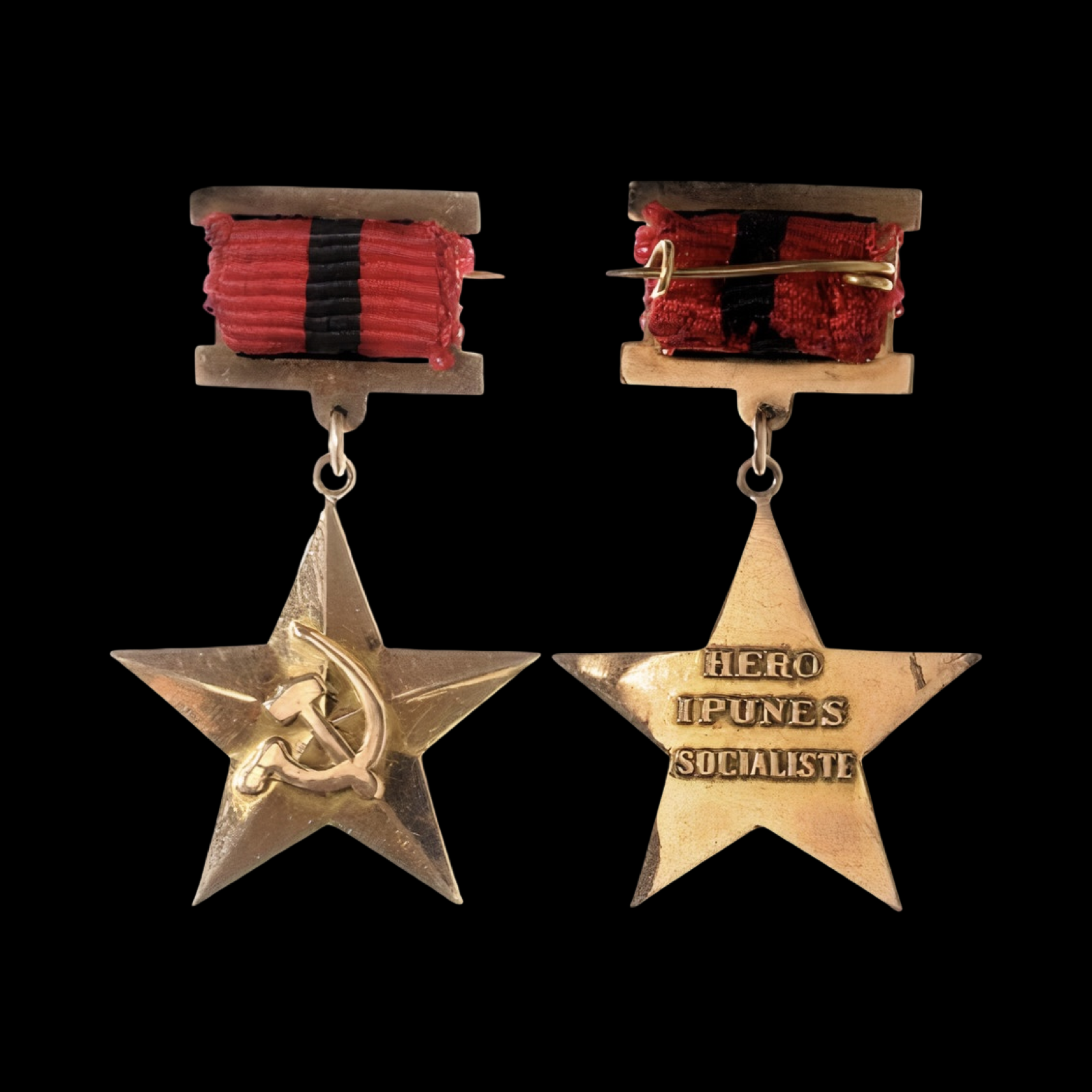
- Native name: Hero i Punës Socialiste
- Type: State decoration
- Awarded for: Awarded to people, collectives, and factories that performed outstanding achievements in production, agriculture, science, and inventions.
- Country: People's Socialist Republic of Albania
- Presented by: The Presidium of the People's Assembly
- Status: Discontinued
- Established: 25 October 1954
- Ribbon bar

The Hero of Socialist Labour (Albanian: Hero i Punës Socialiste; Heroinë e Punës Socialiste) was an honorary title in the People's Socialist Republic of Albania and other Eastern Bloc countries.

It was the highest degree of distinction for exceptional achievements in national economy and culture. It provided a similar status to the title Hero of the People that was awarded for heroic deeds, but unlike the latter, was awarded to citizens who contributed to the development of Albania's industry, agriculture, transportation, trade, science and technology and promoted the might and the glory of Albania.

The title was introduced by the decree of the Albanian parliament in 1954 and extended to agricultural workers with a law in 1961. Only the Albanian parliament could deprive a person of this title.

== Recipients ==
- Ali Nurihana – agricultural worker
- Çan Pao Y – agricultural specialist
- Demir Tusha – driver
- Frrok Kolë Kaçorri – miner
- Hamdi Caka – lawyer and public official
- Hamdi Ferhati – worker
- Hasan Bekteshi – worker
- Hilmi Selenica – military officer
- Hysen Laçej – worker
- Hysen Veizi – worker
- Ilmi S. Qazimi – military officer and writer
- Isa Zyber Hodo – worker
- Ismet Sali Bruçaj – worker
- Isuf Emin Plloqi – worker
- Izet Dashi – worker
- Jorgo Dushi – worker
- Kujtim Shimi – worker
- Lec Barbullushi – agricultural worker
- Lezan Pisili – worker
- Maqo Dhori – agricultural worker
- Mehmet Bekteshi – worker
- Mehmet Shehu – politician and military officer
- Mitro Delijorgji – worker
- Myslym Peza – military commander and politician
- Njazi Shmitraku – worker
- Nuredin Hoxha – worker
- Osman Reshkja – worker
- Pandi Kocaqi – worker
- Petro Olldashi – worker
- Qemal Hate – worker
- Ramazan Pasmaçiu – agricultural worker
- Rexhep Ruci – worker
- Sadik Dervishi – worker
- Sali Vata – worker
- Servet Kosiqi – worker
- Shyqyri Kanapari – worker
- Sulejman Haka – worker
- Teki Aliaj – worker
- Todo Manço – worker
- Vasil Kamami – worker
- Vesim Xhengo – worker
- Xhevdet Laze – worker
- Ylli Popa – physician and academic
- Ylli Zaimi – military officer
- Zarif Saliu – worker
- Automobile Freight Park, Tirana
- Bashkimi i Rinisë së Punës të Shqipërisë – youth organization
- District of Gjirokastër
- District of Korçë
- District of Përmet
- First Albanian School, Elbasan – educational institution
- Women's carpet collective, Korçë – handicraft collective
- Niko Josifi's agricultural brigade, Pojan – agricultural brigade
- Uzina "Enver" – industrial enterprise

== See also ==
- Orders, decorations and medals of Albania
- Hero of the People

== Notes and references ==
- Full list of honorary titles given in Albania in the 1945-1990 period
