= Bule =

Bule may refer to:

== People ==
- Bule Naipi (1922–1944), Albanian hero
- Iva Bule (born 2004), Croatian handball player
- Jeffery Bule (born 1991), Solomon Islands football player
- Nino Bule (born 1976), Croatian football player and manager

== Other ==
- Bule (woreda), Ethiopia
- Bule (term), Indonesian word
