= Qemal Stafa (disambiguation) =

Qemal Stafa may refer to:

- Qemal Stafa, World War II Albanian hero
- Qemal Stafa Stadium, a football stadium in Tirana Albania, named after Qemal Stafa
- Qemal Stafa High School, a high school named after Qemal Stafa
