= Nushi =

Nushi is an Albanian surname. Notable people with the surname include:

- Kozma Nushi (1909–1945), Albanian Hero
- Gogo Nushi (1913–1970), Albanian politician
- Kristian Nushi (born 1982), Kosovar Albanian footballer
- Pajazit Nushi (1933–2015), Kosovar Albanian psychologist
- Rinor Nushi (born 1996), Swedish footballer

== See also ==
- Nuși Tulliu (1872–1941), Aromanian poet and prose writer; Nushi Tulliu in Aromanian
- Nushi Mahfodz (born 1975), Malaysian politician
- Nishi (surname)
