= Kozma Nushi =

Albanian hero (1909–1945)

Personal details
- Born: June 15, 1909 Vuno, Himara, Albania
- Died: January 23, 1945 (aged 35) Gusen, Upper Austria, Austria
- Awards: Hero of the People

Kozma Nushi (Vuno, 1909 – Mauthausen concentration camp , 1945) was a Hero of the People of Albania.

== Personal life ==
When he was young he became an economic emigrant in France, working in the city of Lyon. Together with his brother, Gogo Nushi who came with him to be schooled in France, they were exposed to left wing political ideas, which were very popular in student and worker environments. He returned to Albania with his brother to take part in the anti-fascist movements. He was arrested by the Nazis and was then interned in a concentration camp where he was killed in Mauthausen in 1945.

== Gallery ==
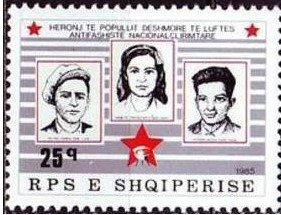
Postage stamp - 1985 depicting Kozma (right) along with Nimete Progonati And Mitro Xhani

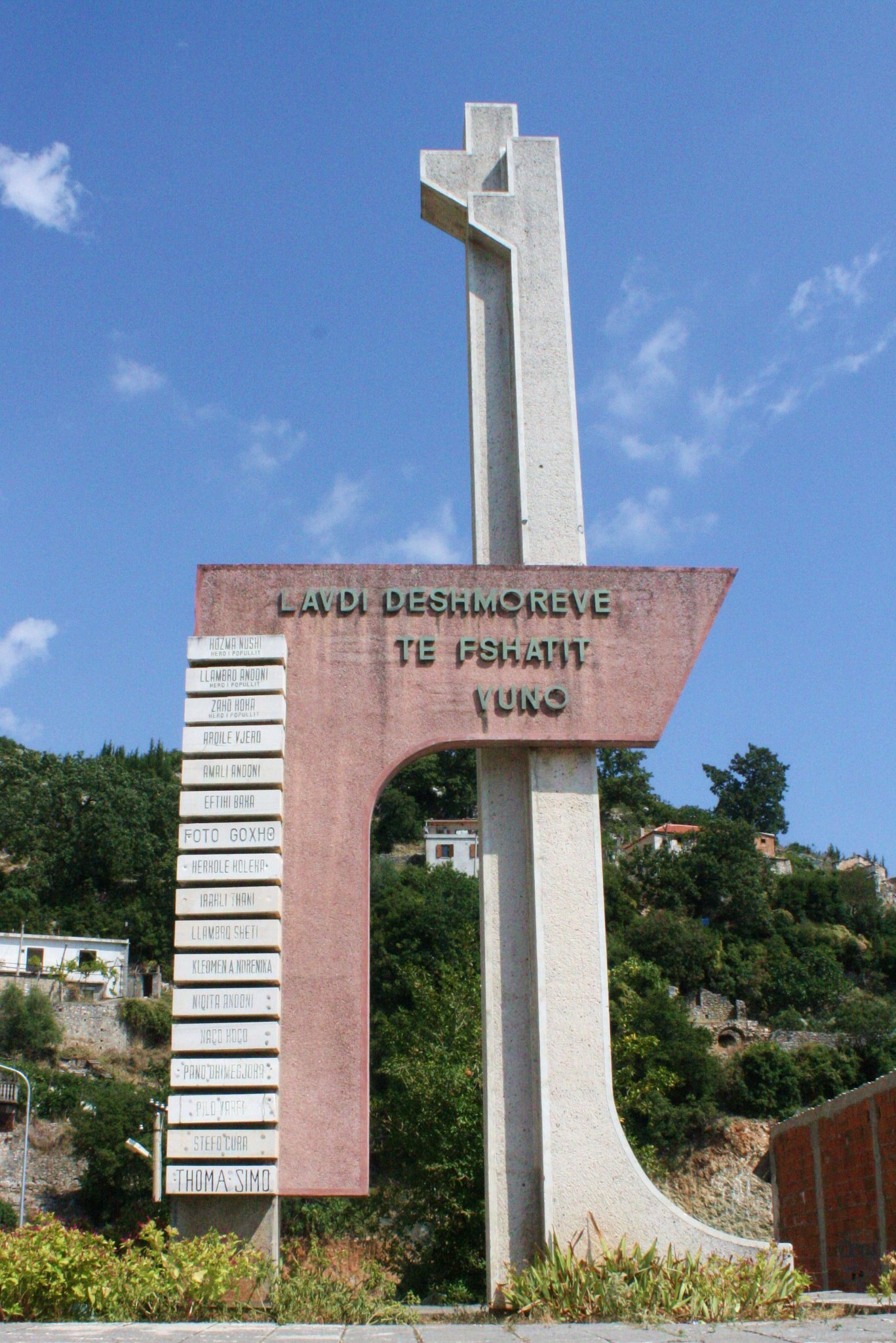
Memorial in Vuno which includes Kozma in it (top)

== See also ==
- Gogo Nushi
- Nushi (surname)
- Enver Hoxha
