= Martyrs' Day (Albania) =

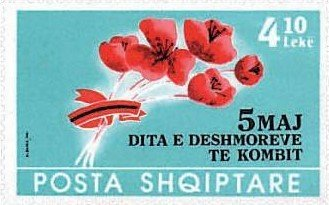
- Observed by: Albania
- Date: 5 May
- Next time: 5 May 2026
- Frequency: Annual

Martyrs' Day (Albanian: Dita e Dëshmorëve) is an Albanian Holiday observed annually on May 5 for the remembrance of those who died for Albanian liberation during World War 2. The date was chosen for its significance as the anniversary of the assassination of Qemal Stafa by Italian fascists in 1942. His death became a symbol of anti-fascism and Albanian liberation.
