= Naxhije Dume =

Albanian politician (1921–2008)

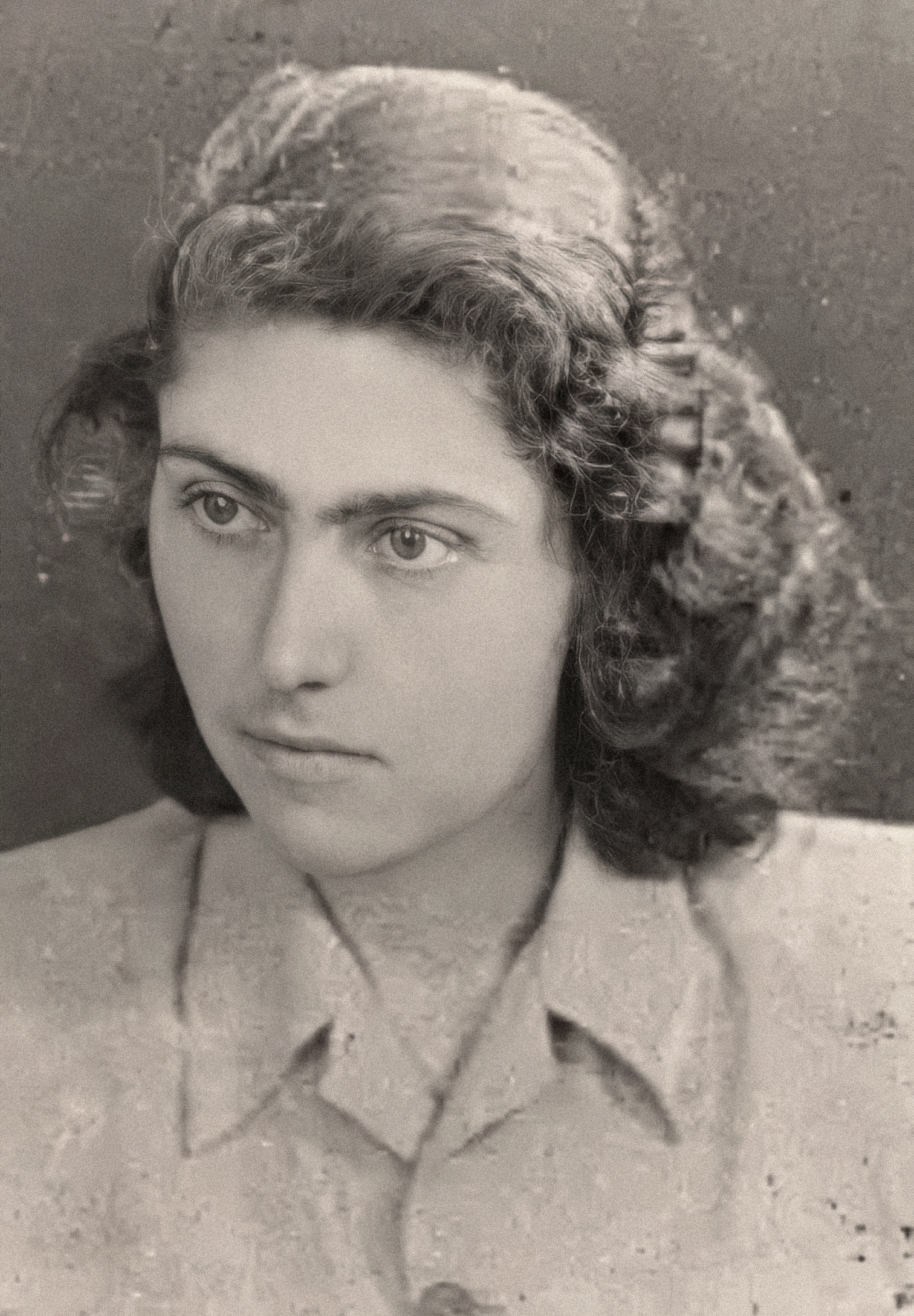

Minister of Education
- In office 6 February 1948 – 22 November 1948
- Preceded by: Sejfulla Malëshova
- Succeeded by: Kahreman Ylli

Member of the Parliament
- In office 1945–1950
- Constituency: Korça

Personal details
- Born: 3 January 1921 Lubonjë, Albania
- Died: 29 September 2008 (aged 87) Tirana, Albania
- Spouse: Nesti Kerenxhi
- Children: 3

Naxhije Dume (3 January 1921 – 29 September 2008) was an Albanian politician. She was one of the first group of female members of the Albanian parliament and the first female minister, serving briefly as Minister of Education in 1948.

== Biography ==
Dume was born in Lubonjë in January 1921, the daughter of Vezirja and Dume Dumja. The family moved regularly due to her father's work and between 1933 and 1941 she was educated at the Queen Mother Pedagogical Institute. She subsequently became a teacher at the Avni Rustemi school in Tirana.

She attended the first conference of the Communist Party of Albania in 1943 and became a member of its central committee. During the Congress of Përmet in May 1944 she was elected to the Anti-Fascist National Liberation Council alongside her husband Nesti Kerenxhi. Dume contested the December 1945 parliamentary elections in the Korça constituency, and was one of three women elected to the Constituent Assembly alongside Liri Gega and Ollga Plumbi. In 1948 she was appointed Minister of Education, becoming the first female minister in Albania. However, later in the year she was criticised by Enver Hoxha at a party congress and removed from her positions.

Between 1951 and 1953 she served as a director of the Archaeological-Ethnographic Museum. In 1956 she became a director of the National Library in 1956, a role she held foe three years. However, in 1959 she was forced to move to Cërrik and lost her job. She later found employment as director of a library in Elbasan, before becoming a teacher in the city. Her husband became director of a mine in Selenicë and the family moved to the town.

Dume retired in 1972. However, after her husband was imprisoned from 1982 to 1983, the couple were interned. She remained in internment until the fall of the People's Socialist Republic in 1992, and returned to Tirana in 1996. She died in September 2008 following a long illness.
