= Bule Naipi =

Albanian resistance fighter

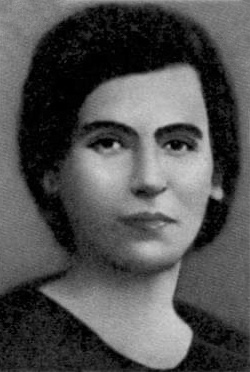
- Born: 1922; Gjirokastër, Principality of Albania
- Died: 17 July 1944 (aged 22); Gjirokastër, German-occupied Albania
- Known for: People's Hero of Albania
- Awards: Hero of the People

Bule Naipi (1922 – 17 July 1944) was a World War II Hero of Albania.

Bule Naipi was born in 1922 in Gjirokastër, Albania. As a member of the Communist Youth, she joined the Antifascist War. Since the beginnings of her childhood she faced grave difficulties as her father had left the city and emigrated to the US and had left Bule and her brother Sado alone. Both of them joined the Resistance against Nazi Germany.

Bule, after having shown extraordinary bravery in the war, ended up a prisoner of war in German hands. She died at only 22, killed by torture, and after Persefoni Kokëdhima was hanged on July 12, 1944, in the Çerçiz Topulli Square in Gjirokastër. She did not give up even in the most difficult last moments when she was lashed and tortured, and, as Kokedhima, never revealed any names of communist colleagues.

Bule Naipi and Persefoni Kokëdhima are commemorated by a statue which stands in Çerçiz Topulli plaza in Gjirokastër.

An Albanian movie, Ngadhnjim mbi vdekjen ("Triumph over death") recalls her life and that of Kokedhima. The movie had a huge success in China, where it was viewed by more than 100 million people.

== Sources ==
- Lame Çekani Bule, Persefoni "8 Nëntori", 1977, (Albanian)
