= Liri Gega =

Albanian communist activist and politician

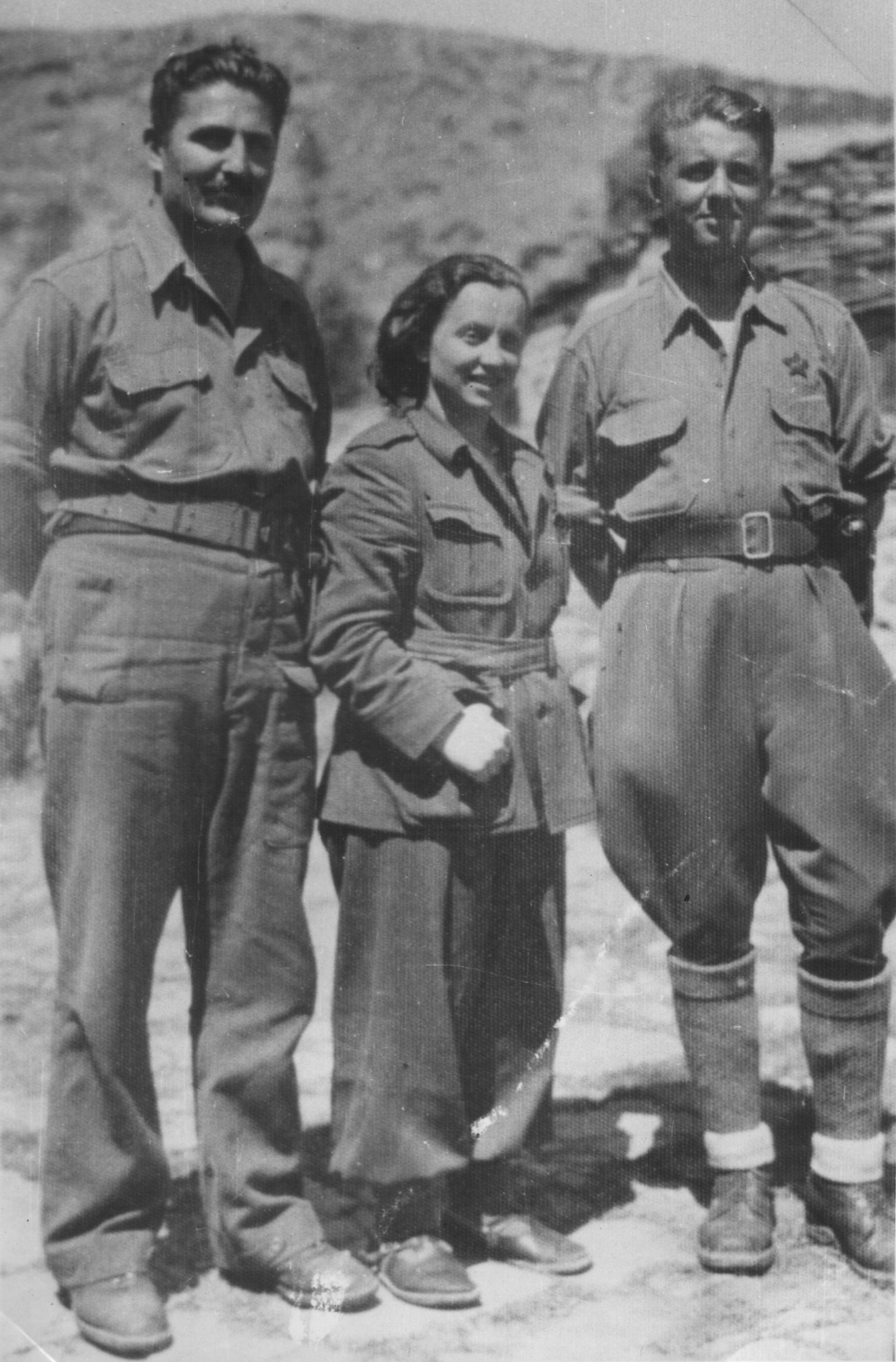

Member of the Constituent Assembly
- In office 1945–1948
- Constituency: Vlorë

Personal details
- Born: 1917 Gjirokastër, Albania
- Died: December 1956 (aged 38–39) Tirana, Albania
- Spouse: Dali Ndreu
- Parent(s): Beso Gega (Father), Asija Gega (Mother)

Liri Gega (1917 – December 1956) was an Albanian communist activist and politician. The only female founder member of the Communist Party of Albania, she was one of the first group of women elected to parliament in 1945. However, she was later executed after being accused of being a Yugoslavian agent.

== Biography ==
Gega was born in Gjirokastër in 1917, to Asija and Beso Gega, a pharmacist and mayor of the town. Her father’s roots may be from northern Albania as the surname Gega represents Ghegs usually. After graduating from the Queen Mother Pedagogical Institute in Tirana, she won a state scholarship to study in Florence. However, she was arrested in 1940 and imprisoned for nearly two years.

She was the only female founder member of the Communist Party in 1941 and became a member of its politburo in March 1943. During the Congress of Përmet in May 1944 she was elected to the Anti-Fascist National Liberation Council. In the same year she became secretary general of the Anti-Fascist Women's Union and the Anti-Fascist Youth Union. In August 1944 she murdered fellow politburo member Mustafa Gjinishi under orders from Yugoslavian communists after he had made an agreement with the anti-communist Balli Kombëtar. She was subsequently removed from the politburo in November, although she remained head of the Women's Union until 1946.

Gega contested the December 1945 parliamentary elections in the Vlorë constituency, and was one of three women elected to the Constituent Assembly alongside Naxhije Dume and Ollga Plumbi. She married Dali Ndreu the following year. At a meeting of the Communist Party's central committee in 1948, Gega was accused of sympathising with separatists in northern Albania, political terror and sectarianism. This was a result of her opposition to eliminating the units that had operated in the area following the end of World War II. She was removed from the Assembly and subsequently worked as a teacher. In 1956 she and her husband were arrested while trying to leave Albania. She was charged with collaboration and the couple were executed for being 'Titoist agents'. Soviet leader Nikita Khrushchev claimed that Gega was pregnant at the time.
