= Laura Andon =

Australian model

Laura Andon is an Australian model, charity ambassador, TV presenter and actress. Andon has modelling experience with: Pantene, Bonds, Frat House, Honey, and Pevonia. Andon is Clearasil's spokesperson for their ‘secrets of looking awesome’ campaign. Andon has also had small parts in films, such as "The Day Hollywood Died".

== Environmental and charitable causes ==
Andon's charity ambassador roles include: Clearasil, Cervical Cancer i-did CAMPAIGN, Bonds Fashion Stylista, and VARIETY (a children's charity). Andon was an ambassador for WWF Earth Hour 2012, following former 2011 ambassadors such as: television host Jamie Durie, actress Cate Blanchett, and model Miranda Curr. In her spare time, Andon is a keen surfer.
