= Scutari High School =

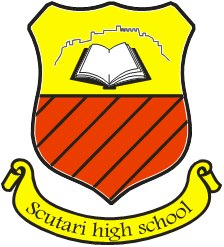
- "Scutari High School Logo"

Information
- Motto: We are the best
- School district: Shkodër ,Albania
- President: Niazi Limaj
- Principal: Sidita Tafa
- Website: Official site

Scutari High School is a private three-year high school in the ancient city of Shkodra, Albania. The school began its regular work on 20 September 2004.

The monthly tuition is 10,000 lek. An applicant must have a minimum eighty-percent eighth-grade average to be accepted.

As of June 2005, the school had around thirty students, of varying religious backgrounds.

== See also ==
- Jordan Misja High School
