= Liri Gero =

Albanian resistance fighter

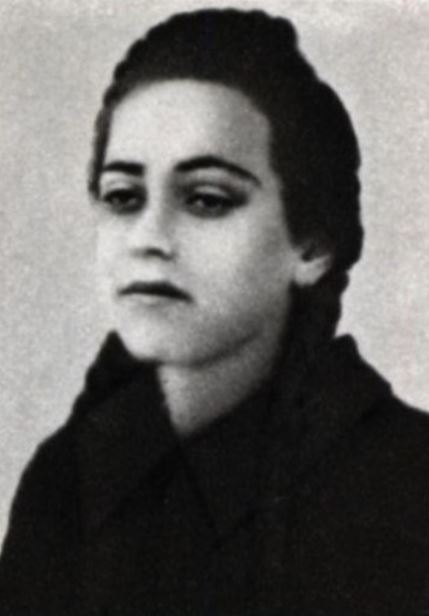
- Born: 1926; Fier, First Albanian Republic
- Died: 6 October 1944 (aged 17–18); Lushnje, German occupation of Albania
- Known for: People's Hero of Albania
- Awards: Hero of the People

Liri Gero (1926–1944) was a young Albanian communist activist and resistance member during World War II. Fighting along the partisan forces, she was killed in a skirmish with the Nazis. For her heroism she received the title People's Hero of Albania.

== Life ==
Gero was of Aromanian descent, born in Fier, central Albania, in 1926. At a very young age she was involved with the resistance, as part of the communist cells opposing the Fascist occupation. Her home was one of the "safe houses" used by the resistance members for their activities. On 14 September 1943, Gero and other 67 girls from Fier, 68 in total joined the same night the ranks of the partisans of the National Liberation Movement, a remarkable moment in the history of Albanian resistance, considering the fact that Fier had around 5,000 people at the time.

Liri joined the 16th Attacking Brigade (Albanian: Brigada e 16-të Sulmuese). On 6 October 1944, while fighting against the German forces along the national road in Çukas near Lushnje, she was wounded. Without the possibility to move, she continued fighting until she lost her senses. The Nazis found her unconscious. Infuriated by the non-predicted resistance of the 17-year-old, they tied her to a tree, poured gasoline on her, and set her on fire.

She received posthumously the "People's Hero" (Heroinë e Popullit) title. Her monument resides in one of Fier's main parks since 2010. A school and a neighborhood in Fier are also named after her.

== See also ==
- Margarita Tutulani
