= Asim Zeneli =

Albanian partisan

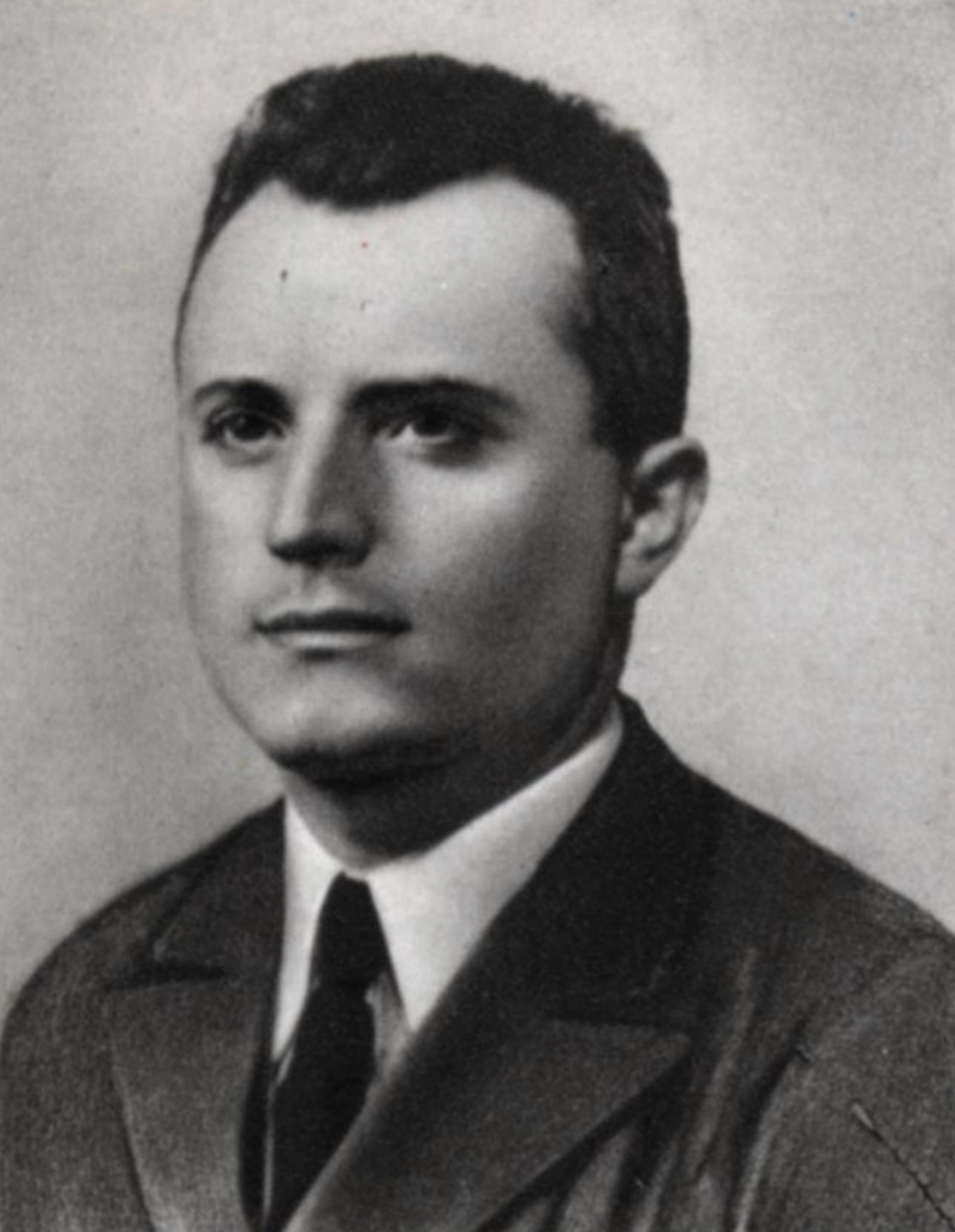
- Born: 3 May 1916; Progonat, Gjirokastër, Occupied Albania
- Died: 2 July 1943 (aged 27); Përmet, Occupied Albania
- Known for: Partisan during the War of Liberation
- Family: Zeneli
- Awards: Hero of the People

Asim Zeneli (3 May 1916 – 2 July 1943) was an Albanian partisan during World War II. His death against Italian troops in 1943 in Mezhgoran became a rallying point for the National Liberation Movement (LANÇ). Posthumously he was awarded the highest honor of the country, Hero of the People.

== Biography ==
Born in Progonat. In the 1930s he studied at the Qemal Stafa High School, in Tirana, Albania. and then at the Military Academy of Modena. In 1939 he was arrested during the anti-Italian protests after the invasion of Albania. A member of the Albanian Communist Party, in March 1943 he became commander of the "Hajredin Tremishti" platoon and in late June commissar of the "Koto Hoxhi" platoon. He died on 2 July 1943 against the Italian army during the capture of Përmet.
