= Hero of the People =

Albanian honorary title

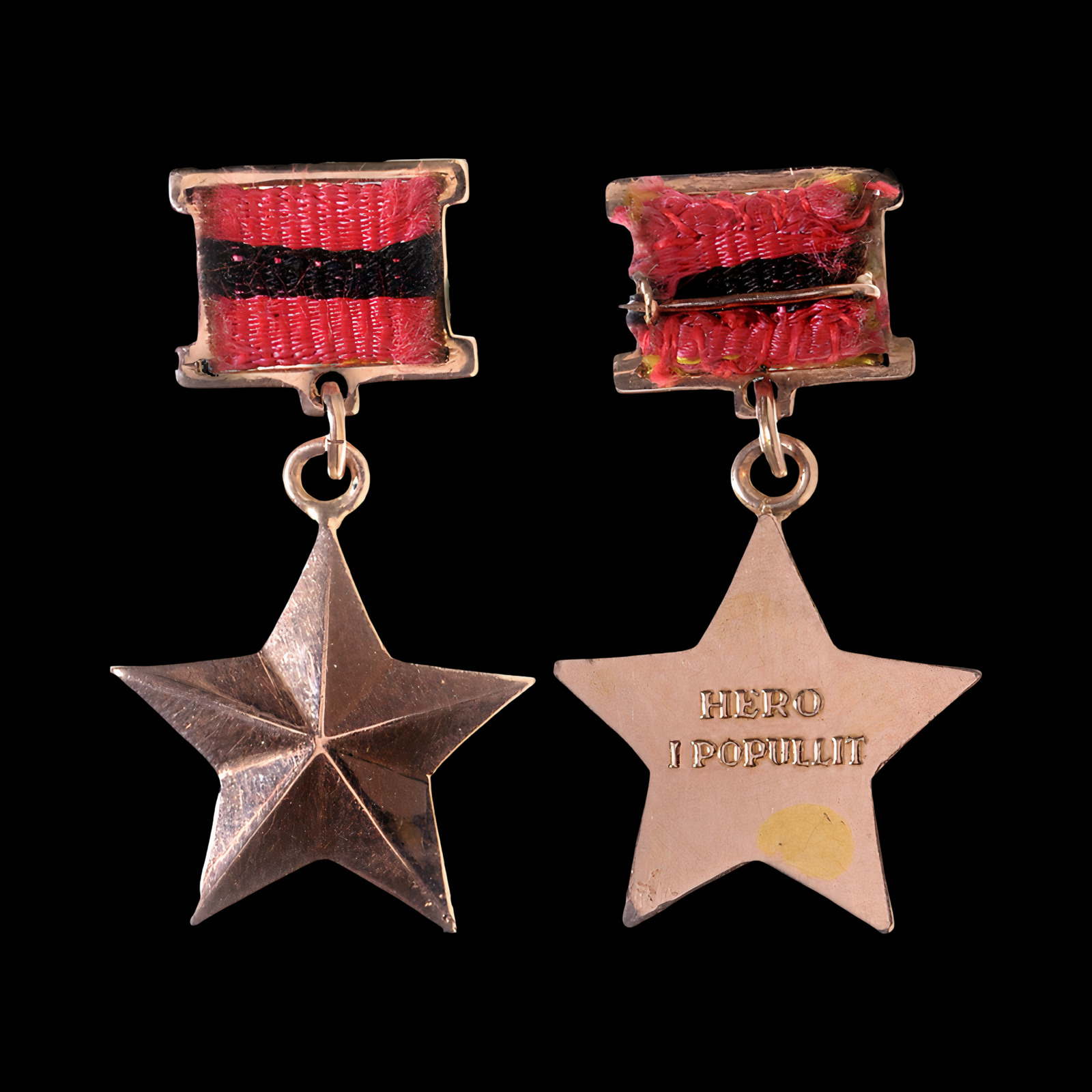
- Native name: Hero i Popullit
- Type: State decoration
- Awarded for: Heroic acts in the accomplishment of duties while defending the territorial integrity of the country.
- Country: People's Socialist Republic of Albania
- Presented by: The Presidium of the People's Assembly
- Status: Discontinued
- Established: 9 July 1945
- Ribbon bar

The Hero of the People (Albanian: (male) Hero i Popullit; (female) Heroinë e Popullit) was the highest title bestowed upon the citizens of the People's Socialist Republic of Albania, one of several Hero titles awarded by Eastern Bloc countries.

The associated Hero of Socialist Labour title was awarded for exceptional achievements in national economy and culture.

== Creation ==
Founded on July 9, 1945, the title was awarded by the Presidium of the People's Assembly acting on a recommendation from the government. The main recipients were soldiers, officers, warrant officers, and generals in both the armed forces and in the Ministry of the Interior. The motives for issuing the award were as follows:

1. For heroic acts in the accomplishment of duties while defending the territory of Albania;
2. For personal or collective heroic accomplishments in time of war;
3. For courage and resolve in directing military units to victory against the enemy under difficult combat situations, thus rendering a great service to the state and to the people.

== Recipients ==
Recipients received a certificate of the title as well as the badge (medallion). The families of those recipients who died or were declared missing were entitled to a monthly pension of ALL 3,000, independent of any other pension or source of revenue. The recipient or the family of a recipient who was either killed or died had priority rights in the acquisition of travel vouchers. They also had priority entitlement in admission to all schools or courses of special instruction. Upon the death of the recipient, the medal itself would be returned to the Presidium of the People's Assembly, while the certificate could be retained by the family as a memento.

A total of 151 people received the title. Enver Hoxha was given the award twice. In the list below, those marked with an asterisk had their titles revoked when they were later branded as “enemies of socialism” and were eventually executed. Hoxha himself and other leaders of the communist party had their titles revoked by decree No.1018, issued on 13 February 1995, for crimes against the people.

=== Posthumous recipients ===
- Asim Aliko
- Manush Alimani
- Shyqyri Alimerko
- Llambro Andoni
- Ramiz Aranitasi
- Vangjel Argjiri
- Muzafer Asqeri
- Fuat Babani
- Koçi Bako
- ~~Beqir Balluku*~~
- Memo Bejko
- ~~Sadik Bekteshi*~~
- Xheladin Beqiri
- Fato Berberi
- Bardhok Biba
- Isa Boletini
- Hyqmet Buzi
- Hajredin Bylishi
- Ylbere Bylybashi
- Shkurte Cara (Skuraj)
- Riza Cerova
- Bajram Curri
- Skënder Çaçi
- ~~Hito Çako*~~
- Hysen Çino
- Reshit Çollaku
- Zonja Çurre
- Ilia Kici (Dashi)
- Ndoc Deda
- Veli Dedi
- Rexh Delia
- Ali Demi
- Qeriba Derri
- Gjok Doçi
- ~~Petrit Dume*~~
- Inajete Dumi
- Emin Duraku
- Mihal Duri
- Hajdar Dushi
- Abdyl Elmazi
- Laze Ferraj
- Abdyl Frashëri
- Musa Fratari
- Shote Galica
- Liri Gero
- Hasan Gërxhaliu
- Meleq Gosnishti
- Mihal Grameno
- Luigj Gurakuqi
- Jaho Gjoliku
- Ded Gjo Luli
- Naim Gjylbegu
- Met Hasa
- Ahmet Haxhia
- Dervish Hekali
- ~~Enver Hoxha*~~
- Vehbi Hoxha
- Shyqyri Ishmi
- Fran Ivanaj
- Tuk Jakova
- Shenjaze Juka
- Mustafa Kaçaçi
- Xhemal Kada
- Branko Kadia
- Dino Kalenja
- Zija Kambo
- ~~Hysni Kapo*~~
- Kajo Karafili
- Ali Kelmendi
- Myslym Keta
- Zaho Koka
- Persefoni Kokëdhima
- Tom Kola
- Teki Kolaneci
- Rexhep Kolli
- Sado Kosheno
- Spiro Kote
- Vojo Kushi
- Vasil Laçi
- Zigur Lelo
- Hydajet Lezha
- Mbrik Lokja
- Nuri Luçi
- ~~Haxhi Lleshi*~~
- Misto Mame
- Dile Marku
- Baba Faja Martaneshi
- Xhoxhi Martini
- Theodhori Mastora
- Mustafa Matohiti
- Ndoc Mazi
- Kanan Maze
- Emine Metaj
- Ram Metaliaj
- Memo Meto
- Pal Mëlyshi
- Fejzi Micoli
- Ivan Milutinović
- Jordan Misja
- Kastriot Muço
- Maliq Muço
- Sali Murati (Vranishti)
- Selam Musai
- Bule Naipi
- Kozma Naska
- Nik Ndreka
- Kozma Nushi
- Estref Osoja
- Hibe Palikuqi
- Llazo Palluqi
- ~~Rahman Parllaku*~~
- ~~Shefqet Peçi~~
- Mine Peza
- Myslim Peza
- Hekuran Pobrati
- Muhamet Prodani
- Nimete Progonati
- Ismail Qemali
- Fahri Ramadani
- Perlat Rexhepi
- Ndreko Rino
- Avni Rustemi
- Nazmi Rushiti
- Mumin Selami
- Çelo Sinani
- Çybra Sokoli
- Mic Sokoli
- Qemal Stafa
- Sadik Stavaleci
- Jorgo Sulioti
- Vasil Shanto
- Abaz Shehu
- ~~Mehmet Shehu*~~
- Myslym Shyri
- Hajdar Tafa
- Lefter Talo
- Marte Tarazhi
- Prenda Tarazhi
- Bajo Topulli
- Çerçiz Topulli
- Bajram Tusha
- Margarita Tutulani
- Mujo Ulqinaku
- Ramiz Varvarica
- Themi Vaso
- Zylyftar Veleshnja
- Asim Vokshi
- Sulejman Vokshi
- Mitro Xhani
- Mustafa Xhani (Baba Faja)
- Alim Xhelo (Tërbaçi)
- Ajet Xhindolli
- Asim Zeneli

== See also ==
- Orders, decorations and medals of Albania
- Hero of Socialist Labour
