= Congress of Përmet =

Meeting of the Albanian Partisans in May 1944

The Congress of Përmet was a meeting of 188 delegates from the Albanian Communist Party, the National Liberation Movement, and the Brigades convened on May 24, 1944, in Përmet, Albania. The presidency of the General National Liberation Council called for the congress after a series of military victories by the pro-Albanian forces had severely weakened the Nazi military presence in the country and gained back large amounts of Albanian territory, thereby making a pro-Albanian victory seem almost certain. The delegates discussed aims of their country's liberation war as well as broader political concerns, especially the need for a transition to postwar governance that would be as smooth as possible. They also elected a provisional government. The majority of delegates came from Southern and Central Albania: 25 from Korça, 48 from Vlora-Gjirokastra, 15 from Berat, 8 from Elbasan, 10 from Tirana, 3 from Peza, and 2 from Durrës.

The congress was modeled on the Anti-Fascist Council for the National Liberation of Yugoslavia.

== Politico-military conditions for calling the Congress of Përmet ==
The National Liberation Movement (LANÇ) and the Albanian National Liberation Army (UNÇSH), or partisan forces, successfully resisted the occupying German army's and local collaborators' concerted onslaught in the winter of 1943–44. German army propaganda, as well as that of Tirana's quisling administration, stated at the time that the anti-fascist resistance and the partisan fighters had been wiped out. Despite the heavy fighting and casualties of the harsh winter campaign, the partisan fighters not only survived but established themselves as a formidable combat force. In the early spring of 1944, it began to rapidly expand its ranks and reach; before the end of the year, it had swept through Albanian territory. Other partisan brigades, as well as various local battalions and squadrons, were recruited to the UNSH from January through May of 1944. At the beginning of summer, control of the antifascist forces was transferred to the Albanian National Liberation Army, which kept Nazi and collaborationist troops restricted mostly to city garrisons, particularly in southern Albania. Having kept a watchful eye on Albanian developments, the anti-fascist coalition (the Allies)—led by the three Great Powers of the Soviet Union, Britain, and the United States—grew increasingly optimistic about Albania's chances to defeat Nazis and Nazism within its borders.

Buoyed by this optimism and continuing LANÇ successes, the presidency of the General National Liberation Council decided the goals of the liberation war and the means for sustaining it needed clearer definition and integration into a fully formed plan for post-war governance. For these reasons, the presidency called for an Antifascist Congress of Përmet to convene on April 15, 1944.

== Selection of delegates ==
Despite the fact that LANÇ was at war, many delegates were selected via democratic elections. The General National Liberation Council's president issued a resolution for delegate representation, which stated:

The congress should include free zones, enemy-occupied territories, partisan and volunteer brigades and battalions, the Anti-Fascist Youth Union with 10 delegates, and the Women's Union with 5 delegates.

In the army and in liberated territories, delegates would be democratically chosen not by secret ballot but by open vote. In non-liberated areas, the delegates would be appointed by county or city governments.

== Decisions ==
Given the diversity of its participants and their geographic representation, the Përmet Congress was a national or constitutional assembly whose aim was to elect the legislative and executive authorities that would administer the country until the conclusion of the war, and subsequently in freed Albania. The congress initially elected the General National Liberation Council (KPNÇ) as the highest governmental body, the principal legislative forum, and the only sovereign representation of the Albanian people, according to historical sources.

The KPNÇ elected the Presidency of the General Council, which consisted of 25 members who in turn elected Omer Nishani its president. Third, the Congress elected the Anti-Fascist National Liberation Committee, which had the characteristics of a transitional administration. This committee, or provisional government, consisted of 11 members. General Secretary of the KPNÇ Enver Hoxha was appointed chairman of the provisional government, and the well-known nationalist Myslym Peza was appointed vice-chairman. From the earliest days of its founding at the congress, the KPNÇ was a legislative body that, in issuing the first important acts and other decisions of a partially liberated Albania, provided crucial planning for the further development of the liberation war and the independence of Albania in later years.

The decisions of the Përmet Congress showed that LANÇ and the UNÇSH, as its main driving force, had created the belief that they would be the winners of the war and would govern the country after the victory. Although some foreign observers considered the optimism of the LANÇ leaders at the time to be overconfident, events proved that the analysis of the situation made by the UNÇSH and that LANÇ was rational and realistic.

The Congress of Përmet, declaring the former King Zog persona non grata, legally put the stamp of the traitor on him, because he turned Albania into a vassal state of Italy and abandoned the people of the country (along with the rulers of his rulers) in difficult days of fascist occupation. The actions of this Congress also sent a clear message to Ballisto-Zogist quislings and collaborators: there would be no influence at the table for those who collaborated with the enemy, nor for those who waited for the invader to depart before "fighting."
