= Vasil Shanto =

Albanian communist politician (1913–1944)

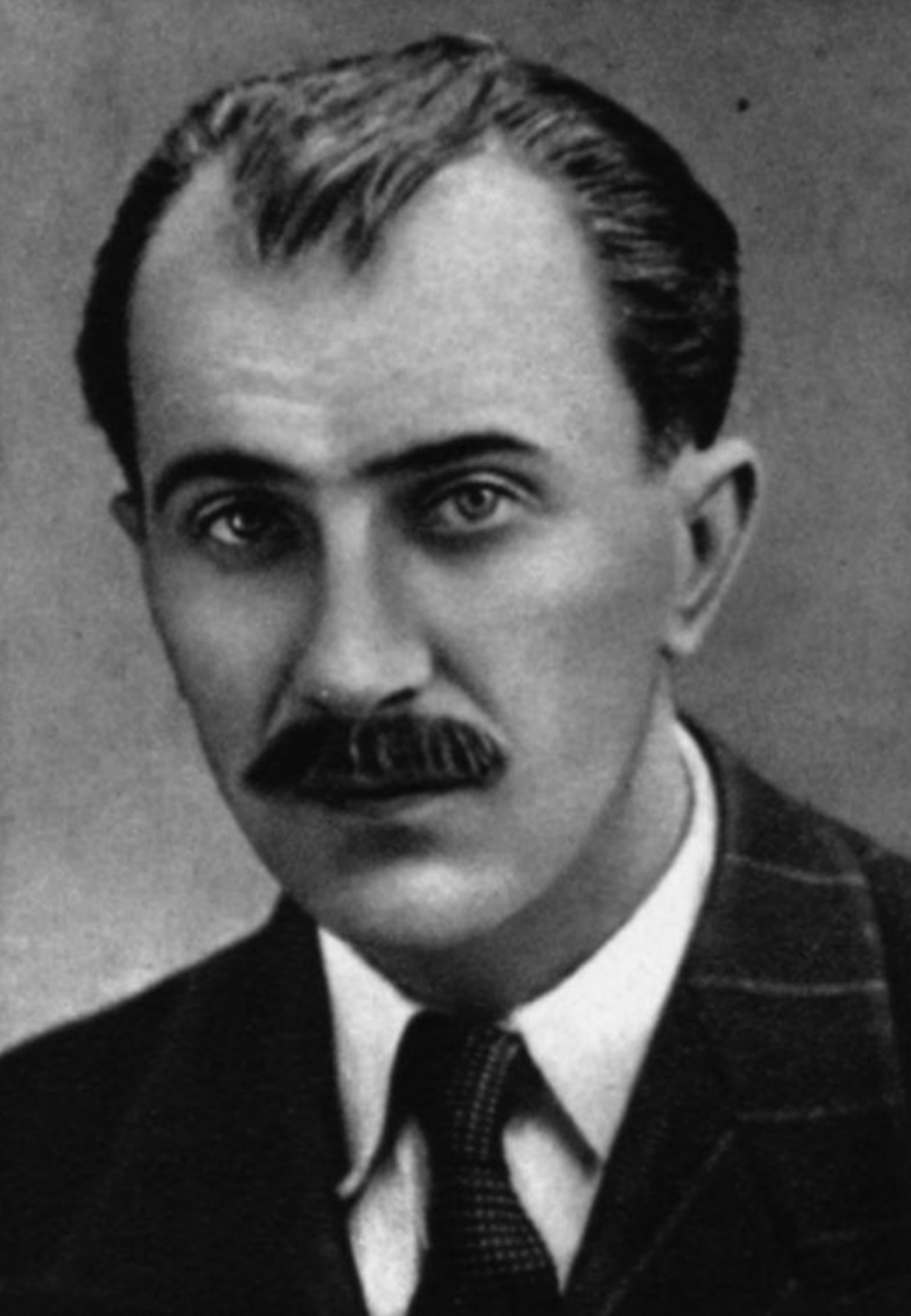
- Born: 17 August 1913; Shkodër, Principality of Albania
- Died: 1 February 1944 (age 30); Shkodër, Democratic Government of Albania
- Known for: Co-founder of the Albanian Communist Party
- Relatives: Elisaveta Shanto (sister)
- Family: Shanto
- Awards: Hero of the People

Vasil Shanto (17 August 1913 – 1 February 1944), called Vasko, was one of the founders of the Albanian Communist Party. He was the leader, along with Qemal Stafa, of the Shkodër communist group. One of the delegates of the party, he was frequently sent to meet with the Yugoslavian Communist Party.

== Early life ==
Shanto was born on August 17, 1913, in Shkodër to an Albanian family. His family owned a bakery in Shkodër, and hailed from Struga. Prior to World War II, the family had a bakery in Tirana. In 1928, he joined the (early) Albanian Communist Party. He worked as a baker.

== World War II ==
At the time of the Italian invasion of Albania (April 7–12, 1939), the Shkodër communist group included Qemal Stafa, a student, Shanto, an artisan, Liri Gega, an intellectual, Imer Dishnica, a doctor, Zef Mala and others. The leaders were Mala, Shanto, Stafa and Themelko. The Shkodër group's activities also spanned over Kosovo and western Macedonia, and the organization included several emigrants from Gjakova and other places in Kosovo, who had moved to Albania between 1930 and 1937.

In spring 1941, Shanto and Stafa met with fellow Communist Fadil Hoxha due to his earlier contact with Yugoslav communist Miladin Popović. Miladin Popović and Dušan Mugoša were the Yugoslav delegates that helped unite the Albanian communist groups in 1941.

In August 1941, the Albanian Communist Party was established through the agreement between the Shkodër (led by Shanto and Qemal Stafa), Korçë and Tirana (led by Enver Hoxha) communist groups. He was one of the founding assembly members from the Shkodër group along with Stafa, Kristo Themelko, and Tuk Jakova, in 8–14 November 1941 in Tirana. Among the founding members, there were 8 Christian members: Koço Tashko, Koçi Xoxe, Pandi Kristo, Gjin Marku, Vasil Shanto, Tuk Jakova, Kristo Themelko and Anastas Lula; and 5 Muslim members: Enver Hoxha, Qemal Stafa, Ramadan Çitaku, Kadri Hoxha, and Sadik Premte. In April 1942, there were only 300 communists in Albania.

Around 8 November 1943, Shanto arrived at the headquarters of 2nd Corpus of the Yugoslav Partisans in Kolašin (now Montenegro). He came in the capacity of delegacy of the Central Committee of the Albanian Communists to meet with Ivan Milutinović and the 2nd Corpus regarding party, political, and military questions important for the further development of the Albanian Communists.

He came into conflict with Hoxha but this was concealed from the people. He was killed in action on 1 February 1944, in a skirmish with German led Albanian forces in Shkodër.

Shanto's sister, Elisaveta, was married to Petar Bulatović-Bulat (Petro Bullati), who was a former colonel in the Albanian Ministry of Internal Affairs, with dual citizenship (Albanian and Yugoslavian). Bullati was accused in 1956 of being an "enemy of the people" and "UDBA agent" and executed. Shanto's sister with the rest of the family were sent to an internment camp.

== Sources ==
- Mihajlov, Mile (1995). Kuzman Josifovski-Pitu: vreme, život, delo, 1915-1944 : prilozi od nauchniot održan na 23 i 24 fevruari 1944 godina vo Prilep. Institut za nacionalna istorija. ISBN 9789989624124.
- Pearson, Owen (2006b). Albania in the Twentieth Century, A History: Volume II: Albania in Occupation and War, 1939-45. I.B.Tauris. ISBN 978-1-84511-104-5.
- Pearson, Owen (2006c). Albania in the Twentieth Century, A History: Volume III: Albania as Dictatorship and Democracy, 1945-99. I.B.Tauris. ISBN 978-1-84511-105-2.
- Pavlović, Blagoje K. (1996). Albanizacija Kosova i Metohije. Evropsko slovo.
- Vickers, Miranda (2011). The Albanians: A Modern History. I.B.Tauris. ISBN 978-0-85773-655-0.
- Dedijer, Vladimir (1949). Jugoslovensko-albanski odnosi. Borba.

Journals

- Vojnoistorijski institut (1969). Zbornik Dokumenta. Vol. 3.
- Institut za savremenu istoriju (1984). Sabrana djela. Vol. 18. Komunist.

News articles

- Jevtić, Miroljub (2014-11-30). "Цела земља 300 комуниста!". Novosti.
