= Asim Zeneli Gymnasium =

School in Gjirokastër, Albania

Coordinates: 40°4′28″N 20°8′9″E

Gjirokastër Gymnasium (Albanian: Gjimnazi i Gjirokastrës), also known as Asim Zeneli Gymnasium (Albanian: Gjimnazi „Asim Zeneli“) is a gymnasium located in Gjirokastër, Albania. The school was founded on 5 November 1923 as one of the first schools of general secondary education in Albania, where students could study regardless of religion, gender and locality.
