= Shote Galica =

Albanian insurgent (1895–1927)

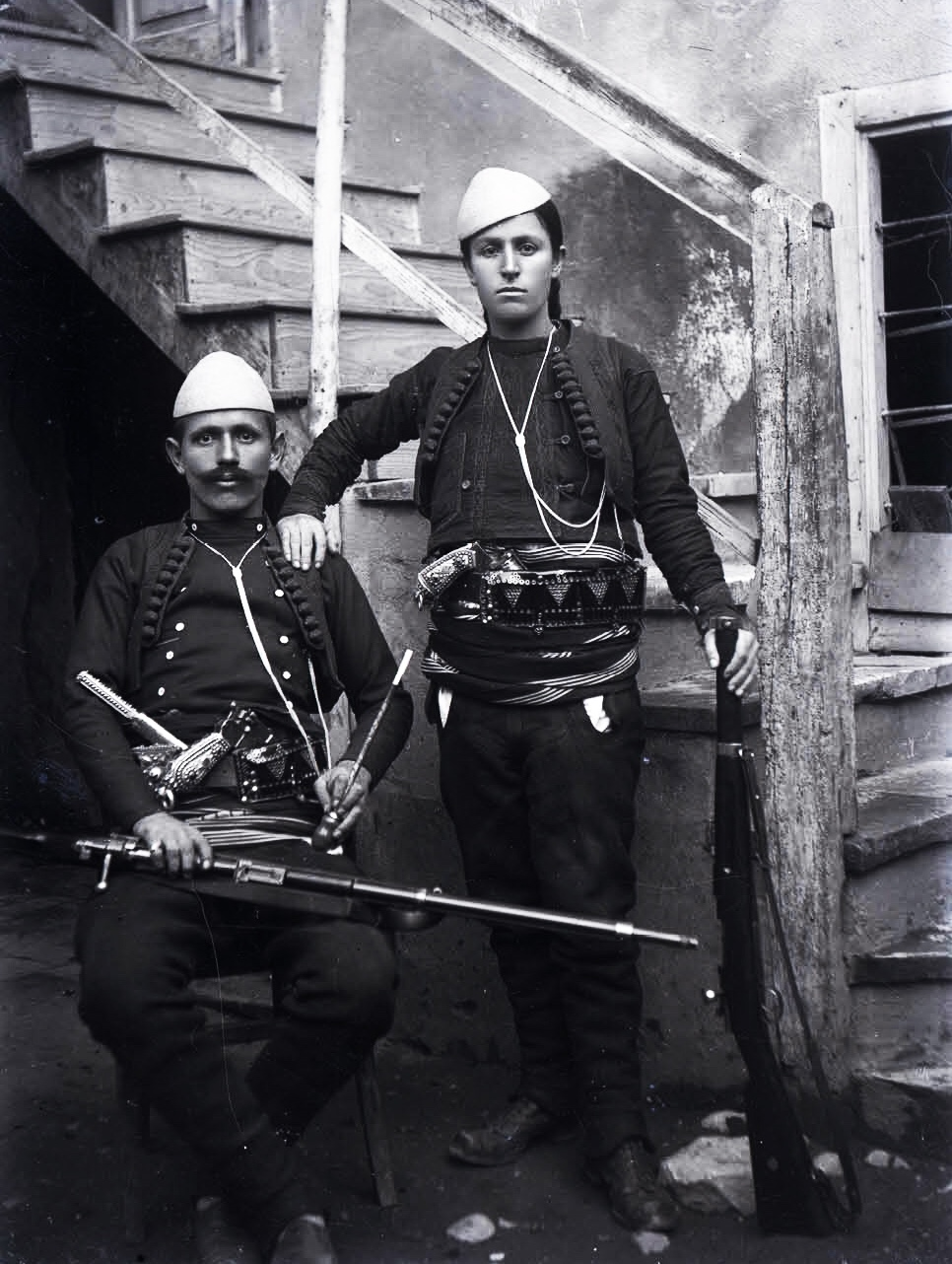
- Azem Galica and Shote Galica, c. 1920
- Born: Qerime Halil Radisheva; 10 November 1895; Radishevë, Kosovo Vilayet, Ottoman Empire (today Kosovo)
- Died: 1 July 1927 (aged 31); Fushë-Krujë, Albanian Republic (today Albania)
- Other name: Shote Galica
- Spouse: Azem Galica
- Awards: Hero of the People
- Military career
- Allegiance: Kachak (1915–1927)
- Branch: Albanian guerrilla, (Kachak)
- Service years: 1915–1927
- Rank: Commander
- Conflicts: Balkan Wars; Drenica-Dukagjin Uprisings

Shote Galica (Albanian: Shotë) (born Qerime Radisheva; 10 November 1895 – 1 July 1927) was a Kachak Albanian insurgent. She has been declared a People's Heroine of Albania.

== Biography ==
She was born in Radisheve village of Drenica region in Kosovo which was then part of the Ottoman Empire. She was the sister of 6 brothers. She married Azem Galica in 1915. In 1919, Shote took part in the Uprisings of Dukagjin and Junik in 1921–23. She and her husband supported opposition leader Fan Noli in his attempts to gain power and implement progressive reforms in Albania. In 1925 after the death of her husband, she took over as a head of his band and fought together with Bajram Curri in Has of Prizren and Lumë. In 1926, in ill health, she moved from Kosovo to Albania where she cared for several of her comrades' orphaned children. Galica spent her final months in Fushë-Kruja, dying 1 July 1927, at the age of 31. She is recalled for her saying, "life without knowledge is like a war without weapons."

== Career ==
In July 1924 she fought in the battle for Drenica (Arbania e Vogël, Little Albania), in which her husband was mortally wounded. After Azem's death, she continued to fight and lead Albanian warriors against the Yugoslav occupation of Kosovo. She fought alongside Bajram Curri in Has and Luma against Serbian troops who had supported Zog during his return to power in December 1924, and she continued to lead the fighting in Kosovo until 1926, when she was severely wounded and decided to move to Albania. Along with hundreds of fighters from the former Kosovo Vilayet in December 1924, interventionist armies fought against Royal Yugoslav forces. She is remembered for having captured a Serb military commander and a number of soldiers at Çikatova. Shote died in poverty in 1927, looking after the orphans left behind by her fellow fighters who were killed during the resistance.

== Death ==
Even though her only son died right after birth, she took in and raised multiple orphans of her comrades, caring for them until her last moments. When she moved to Albania, her fingers had been amputated from the wounds she had suffered. Hoping to receive support from the ruler of that period, King Zog I, she wrote a letter pleading for help:

"I am Shote Galica, the wife of Azem Galica, the leader of the Kosovo Kaçak Movement. I also have four orphaned children; they are the children of the fighters who died for the liberation of Kosovo. I am forced to inform you that I am about to die of hunger, together with the orphaned children.".

Despite her appeal, no help came from King Zog I's regime. Shote Galica died from hunger and neglect in 1927, at the age of just 31.

== Legacy ==
The Albanian people honor Galica for defending the national cause, celebrating her as a martyr of the nation. On the 90th anniversary of Galica's death, 10 November 2017, the President of the Republic of Kosovo, Hashim Thaçi, established the "Shote Galica" order to commend people who have "advocated, committed acts of bravery or acts of courage for gender equality." Eight women were recognized with this award in 2021.

Galica is one of the principal subjects of the essay collection No Man's Lands: Eight Extraordinary Women in Balkan History, by the Anglo-Kosovan writers Elizabeth Gowing and Robert Wilton.

== See also ==
- Kachaks
