= Koçi Bako =

Albanian communist activist

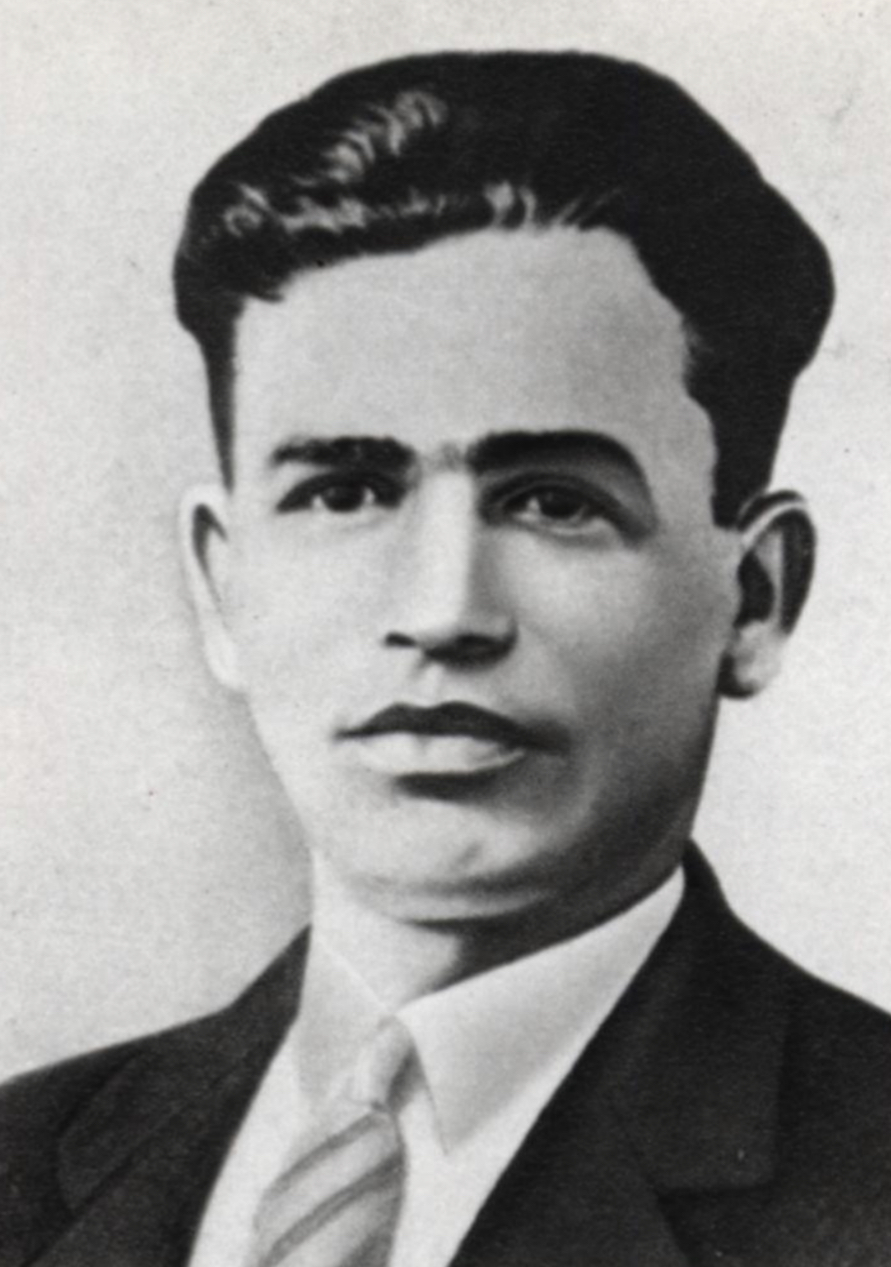
- Born: 1905 or 1906; Korçë, Manastir Vilayet, Ottoman Empire (modern Albania)
- Died: 8 November 1941; Korçë, Italian-occupied Albania
- Occupation: Artisan
- Known for: First martyr of the Albanian Communist Party
- Awards: Hero of the People

Koçi Bako (1906 or 1905–1941) was an Albanian Communist activist. An early member of the Communist Group of Korçë, he is the first martyr of the Communist Party of Albania since its creation.

== History ==
Bako was born in Korçë, today's Albania, back then still part of the Ottoman Empire in 1905 or 1906. He was an orphan. An autodidact, he worked as an artisan and as a shepherd. He became communist of the early hours affiliated with the first Albanian communist group in Korçë.
According to Enver Hoxha's memoirs, Bako kept a copy of the Communist Manifesto as a precious thing, and had given to him to translate.

On 8 November 1941, an anti-Italian and anti-Fascist demonstration was held in Korçë. The carabinieri and the police intervened brutally and ended on opening fire on the crowd. Bako was shot dead somewhere close to the monument of Themistokli Gërmenji, while many others were wounded. He became the first martyr of the Communist Party which was founded on 8 November. His monument resides in Korçë. Streets are named after him, and he appears in Albanian stamps. He posthumously received the Albanian honorary title "People's Hero".
