= Albesian Mataj =

Kosovo Liberation Army soldier

- Born: 3 August 1982; Gjakovë, SFR Yugoslavia (today Kosovo)
- Died: 28 February 1999 (aged 16); Pashë, near Gjakovë, FR Yugoslavia (today Kosovo)
- Military career
- Allegiance: Kosova
- Branch: Kosovo Liberation Army
- Service years: 1998–1999
- Conflicts: Kosovo War

Albesian Mataj (3 August 1982 - 28 February 1999) was an Albanian teenager who was a fighter of the Kosovo Liberation Army in the Kosovo War. He was one of the youngest soldiers of the Kosovo Liberation Army (KLA) who died on active duty. He is buried in Gjakova. Yearly commemoration events are held in his memory on 28 February and a memorial has been erected in Gjakova.

== Events ==
His family is from the village Osek i Pashës in Gjakova. He was born in 1982. His father Salih was persecuted by the regime for his political activity for the independence of Kosovo. He had two brothers Albinot and Dukagjin. Albinot and Albesian both enlisted on 23 Mars 1998 in Junik in the operational zone of Dukagjin of the KLA under commander Nimon Tofaj. He fought in the siege of Junik and after its fall moved to Gllogjan where he was on the frontline as early as 10 December 1998. In Gllogjan, he fought under commander Daut Haradinaj and then was transferred to the unit "Black Eagles" under commander Idriz Balaj. On the late hours of 27 February 1999 as he was leaving from his village Osek i Pashës for Gjakova he was killed in an ambush operation by the Serbian police. Mataj is one of the youngest fallen fighters of the KLA who died against the state of Serbia in the Kosovo War for the independence of the region. His body was taken by the Serbian police, but after OSCE intervention it was returned to his family. He was buried on 3 March 1999 in Gjakova.

A yearly commemoration is held in Gjakova with participation from official representatives of the municipality, ex-KLA soldiers who fought side by side with him and family members. A memorial in his honor has been erected. The inscription on the pedestal starts with the line "Udhëtar kështu bëhet historia" (Traveller, this is how history is made).
