= Slatino, Tearce =

Slatino Слатино Sllatinë
- Village
- Location within North Macedonia
- Coordinates: 42°04′00″N 21°02′20″E
- Country: North Macedonia
- Region: Polog
- Municipality: Tearce

Population (2002)
  - Total: 3,198
- Time zone: UTC+1 (CET)
  - Summer (DST): UTC+2 (CEST)
- Car plates: TE
- Website: .

Slatino (Macedonian: Слатино, Albanian: Sllatinë) is a village in the municipality of Tearce, North Macedonia.

== History ==
Slatino is attested in the 1467/68 Ottoman tax registry (defter) for the Nahiyah of Kalkandelen. The village had a total of 64 Christian households, 4 bachelors and 4 widows.

According to the 1467-68 Ottoman defter, Slatino appears exhibits largely Orthodox Christian Slavic anthroponyms.

== Demographics ==
As of the 2021 census, Slatino had 3,198 residents with the following ethnic composition:

- Albanians 3,125
- Persons for whom data are taken from administrative sources 65
- Others 8

According to the 2002 census, the village had a total of 4,112 inhabitants. Ethnic groups in the village include:

- Albanians 4,018
- Macedonians 11
- Romani 7
- Serbs 1
- Bosniaks 1
- Others 75

In statistics gathered by Vasil Kanchov in 1900, the village of Slatino was inhabited by 275 Muslim Albanians and 70 Orthodox Bulgarians.
