= 28 Nëntori High School =

Location
- Shkodra; Albania
- Coordinates: 42.074299°N 19.52766°E

Information
- Type: Public High School

28 Nëntori High School is a public high school in Shkodra, Albania. It is the largest school in the city.

== See also ==
- Jordan Misja High School
