= Margarita Tutulani =

Albanian partisan (1925–1943)

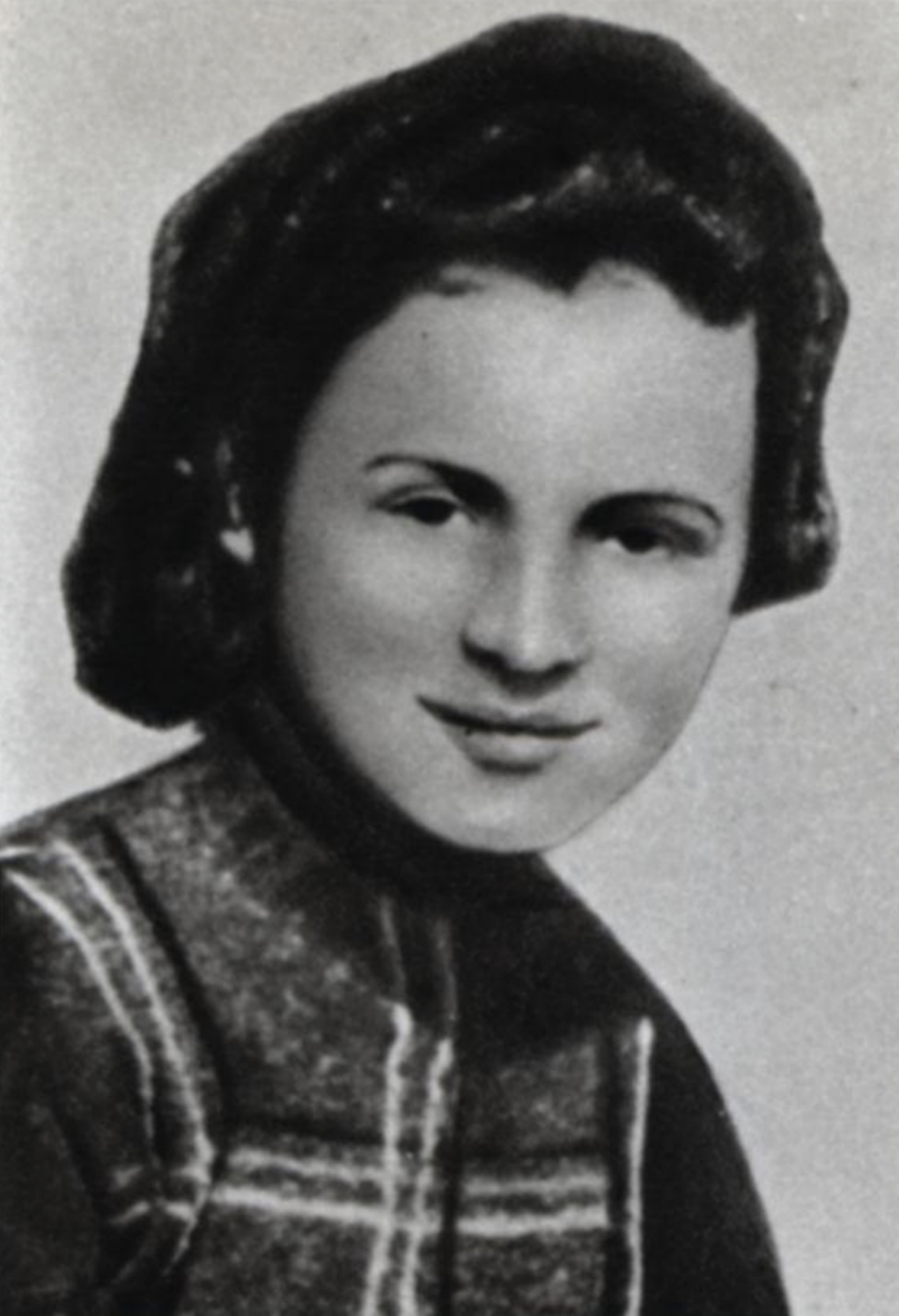
- Born: 1925; Berat, Principality of Albania
- Died: 6 July 1943 (aged 18); Gosë, Kavajë, Italian-occupied Albania
- Known for: Partisan during the War of Liberation
- Parent: Miltiadh Tutulani (Father)
- Relatives: Kristaq Tutulani (Brother), Dhimitër Tutulani (Grandfather)
- Awards: Hero of the People

Margarita Tutulani (1925 – 6 July 1943) was an Albanian anti-fascist activist during World War II. Her brutal death inspired many to join the resistance against fascism in Albania.

== Biography ==
Tutulani was born in the Gorica neighborhood of Berat. Her grandfather Dhimitër Tutulani was of Aromanian origins, a notable lawyer, and one of the signers of the Albanian Declaration of Independence in 1912. Her father was a member of the Albanian Parliament. She attended the Queen Mother Pedagogical Institute in Tirana.

When Italy invaded Albania in April 1939, Tutulani moved back to Berat, where she and her family protested and demonstrated against Italian rule of their country. In 1942, she joined the Communist Party. She was also a leading figure in the November 28, 1942 demonstration in Berat, which was an anti-fascist protest that drew thousands of people. After November, she was wanted by the fascist government.

Tutulani and her brother, Kristaq Tutulani, were eventually arrested in Berat on July 4, 1943. After their arrest, they were then subjected to torture while in prison. They were later moved out of the prison and shot in Gosa, near Kavaja, on July 6, 1943.

The city of Berat was shocked at the death of both brother and sister. A "photo of her mangled body" circulated, and eventually the brutality of her death inspired people to join the resistance against the fascist government.

A statue of Tutulani is at the National Martyrs' Cemetery of Albania. Tutulani left behind writing which is now part of the Tutulani family archives, which included poetry, memoirs and essays. The Albanian linguist Vehxhi Buharaja wrote a poem in her honor, "Margarita," ten days after she was killed.

== See also ==
- Liri Gerro
