= Ndue Përlleshi =

Albanian National Hero From Kosova) (1908–1948)

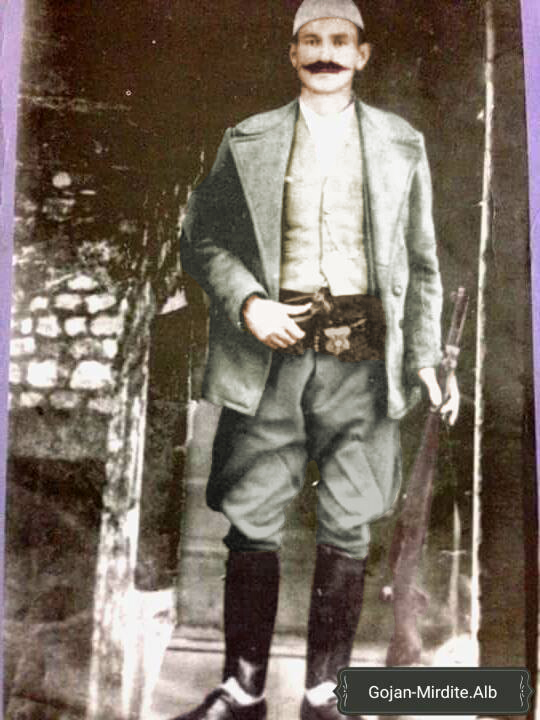
- Photo of Ndue Përlleshi
- Born: 1908; Paskalice Village, Lug Te Drinit, (in modern-day, Kosova)
- Died: 29 August 1949 (aged 40–41); Iballe, Albania
- Known for: Commander of the Dukagjini Band during World War II
- Spouse: Marija (Çetta) Përlleshi
- Children: 3, including Nreca, Zefi (Gjergj), and Prena (Mana)
- Parent(s): Gjon Përlleshi, Prena(Metë) Krasniqi nga Nepolja

Ndue Përlleshi (1908 – 29 August 1949) was a Kosovar-Albanian military leader, local and national hero, known as "Trimi i Dukagjinit". He was the Commander of the "Dukagjini Band" during World War II. On February 8, 1948, during the Battle of Bokshiq, Ndue Përlleshi, along Shaban Dema and Ndrec Nikolla, fought Serbian, Montenegrin and Albanian communist forces numbering 600. Përlleshi killed 27 communists, and wounded many others, and both his comrades died. He survived with four wounds and returned to his home until Janko Boric, the local community leader, spotted him and threw a grenade through his window. Përlleshi quickly grabbed it and tossed it back to Boric wounding him. Ndue Përlleshi was killed on 29 August 1949 in Albania by the communist forces of Mehmet Shehu. Ndue Përlleshi is a much honoured hero amongst the Albanians of Dukagjin and Peja-region. He is mentioned in Albanian epic folklore.
