= Çerçiz Topulli Square =

Square in Gjirokastër, Albania

Coordinates: 40°4′29″N 20°8′24″E

Çerçiz Topulli Square (Albanian: Sheshi „Çerçiz Topulli“) is a town square located in Gjirokastër, Albania. In fact, it is actually a widened street (Rruga Gjin Zenebisi, Gjin Zenebisi Street) located east of the entrance of Qafa e Pazarit (Bazaar Pass) The city's Old Bazaar begins at the upper corner (west) of the square.

The square is named after Çerçiz Topulli, Albanian hero born in Gjirokastër. Within the square is a monument also dedicated to him. It was erected in 1934 by Odhise Paskali, an Albanian realist sculptor. On the monument is a bullet hole inflicted by an Italian soldier during the Occupation of Albania during World War II.

== History ==
A rally was held in the square on 17 May 1944. While Albanian politician Ismail Golemi gave a speech, a hand grenade was thrown into the crowd, effectively killing seven people: Aleko Kekezi, Miro Sporeja, Gole Gushi, Asaf Gjebrea, Fato Gozhita, Skënder Çina and Arshi Mezini.

A more detailed account was provided by Myzafer Malile, a veteran of the Albanian National Liberation Movement. He reports that the rally was initially staged by Ismail Golemi, and was truly meant to be massacre. Golemi and several of his colleagues were located in a balcony above the square. Every citizen of Gjirokastër were to participate in the rally, where, because the square was to be flooded by people, no one could hide. Upon the opening of the "rally," a person behind the mayor was to throw a hand grenade into the middle of the crowd. This grenade was indeed thrown into the crowd, killing three people, and many left injured. Among those killed was a shoemaker of the Balloma clan from the Varosh neighbourhood. In panic, Golemi grabbed a rifle and fired it, sending the crowd into a frenzy.

Immediately after the rally, Ballistët (members of Balli Kombëtar) patrols were launched throughout the city. A patrol of three men that circulated in the neighborhood of Hazmurat shot 25-year-old Arshi Mezini in the front gate of Mehmet Terihati's household. Wounded, Terihati's mother attempted to bring Mezini to a hospital. However, Mezini died before reaching the hospital.

In an act to cover the crime, Balli Kombëtar falsely blamed guerrilla leaders as planting the grenade-throwing person into the crowd.

== Expansion efforts ==
Due to increased tourism in the last decade, local citizens and various tourist groups expressed the need for an expansion of the square to adequately provide more room for parking, effectively doubling the size from 6,000 square metres to 12,000 square metres. This would allow 1500 parked vehicles in the square. Local authorities approved the project, albeit the project of €1 million.
