= Kaçinar =

- Administrative unit
- Location within Albania
- Coordinates: 41°53′N 19°54′E
- Country: Albania
- County: Lezhë
- Municipality: Mirditë

Population (2023)
  - Administrative unit: 257
- Time zone: UTC+1 (CET)
  - Summer (DST): UTC+2 (CEST)

Kaçinar is a village and a former municipality in the Lezhë County, northwestern Albania. At the 2015 local government reform it became a subdivision of the municipality Mirditë. The population at the 2023 census was 257.
