= Naim Frasheri High School =

High school in Durrës, Albania

Coordinates: 41.3267°N 19.4478°E

Naim Frasheri High School is a high school in Albania. Its creation reflects the Albanian modern history of school. The high school is located in the city of Durrës. It was founded on 1957–1958 by the Albanian government. More than 1430 students are currently students whereas the high school has 45 teachers. Four floor building it has a total number of 30 classes. The high school took its name from Naim Frashëri (25 May 1846 – 20 October 1900) who was an Albanian poet and writer. He was one of the most prominent figures of the Albanian National Awakening (Albanian: Rilindja Kombëtare) of the 19th century, together with his two brothers Sami and Abdyl. He is widely regarded as the national poet of Albania. He authored 22 works. Naim Frasheri High School was classified as one of the top five schools in Albania Republic in 2005–2006 and has been rewarded with the Honor of Durres city prize.

== History ==
Pupils at the school were the first to respond to the Party of Labour of Albania's 1967 denunciation of religion by demonstrating in support of the closure of churches and mosques.
