= Jordan Misja High School =

Public school in Shkodra, Albania

Coordinates: 42°4′16″N 19°31′7″E

Information
- Established: 1957; 68 years ago

Jordan Misja High School is a public high school located in the major northern city of Shkodra, Albania. Established in 1957, it is named after People's Hero of Albania, Jordan Misja.

== See also ==
- 28 Nentori High School
