= Emin Duraku =

Albanian partisan

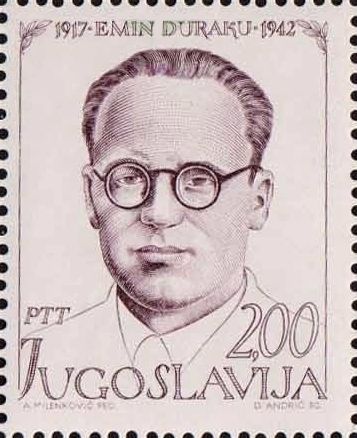
- Duraku on a 1973 Yugoslavian stamp
- Born: 1 January 1918; Đakovica, Kingdom of Serbia (now Kosovo)
- Died: 23 December 1942 (aged 24); Lipljan, Kosovo
- Awards: Hero of the People

Emin Duraku (1918 – 23 December 1942) was an Albanian Yugoslav partisan active during World War II in Yugoslavia as an organizer of the liberation struggle in Kosovo. He was posthumously proclaimed a national hero of Albania and Yugoslavia.

== Biography ==
Duraku was born in Đakovica in 1918. He was an early Albanian member of the Yugoslav communist movement. He returned to his home region in 1939 and was part of the bureau of the party's regional committee. Duraku was killed by fascist forces in Lipljan and became a martyr to the communist cause. Following his death, an Albanian partisan unit, formed in January 1943, was named after him. An elementary school in Tirana and one in Štimlje also are named after him.
