= Branko Kadia, Jordan Misja and Perlat Rexhepi =

Albanian partisans killed in 1942

Branko Kadija
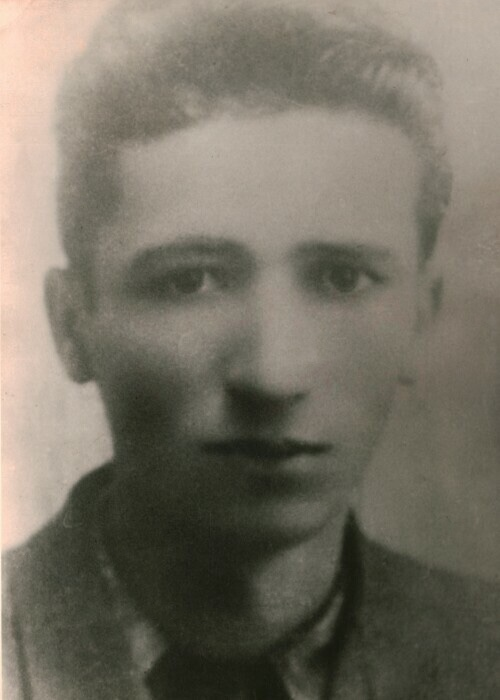
- Born: 1921; Shkodër, Principality of Albania
- Died: June 22, 1942 (aged 20–21); Shkodër, Italian-occupied Albania
- Occupations: student, Albanian resistance in World War II
- Political party: Communist Party of Albania
- Awards: Hero of the People

Jordan Misja
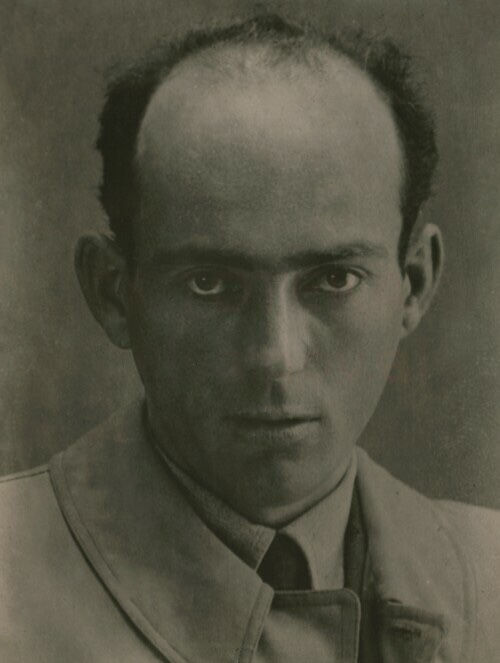
- Born: 1913; Shkodër, Albania
- Died: June 22, 1942 (aged 28–29); Shkodër, Albania
- Occupations: student, painter, Albanian resistance in World War II
- Political party: Communist Party of Albania
- Awards: Hero of the People

Perlat Rexhepi
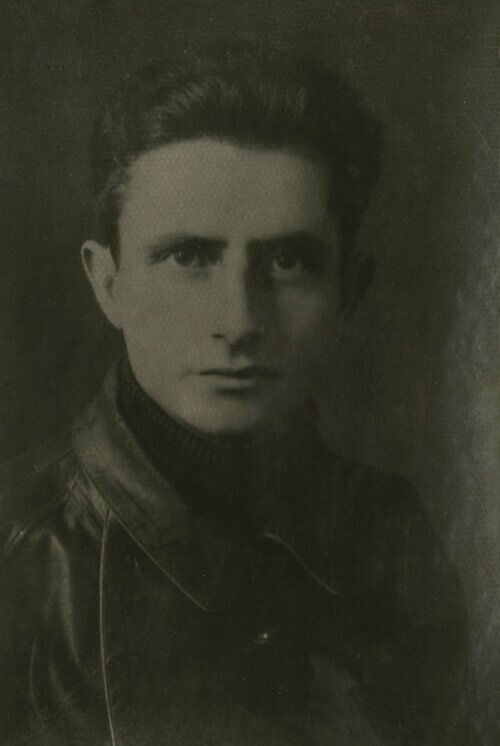
- Born: October 25, 1919; Vajzë, Vlorë, Albania
- Died: June 22, 1942 (aged 22); Shkodër, Albania
- Occupations: student, Albanian resistance in World War II
- Political party: Communist Party of Albania
- Awards: Hero of the People

On 22 June 1942, the Albanian student trio of Branko Kadija, Jordan Misja, and Perlat Rexhepi, who stayed in Misja's house at Firaj Street in Shkodër (at the time part of the fascist Italian protectorate of the Albanian Kingdom), were for several hours surrounded by Albanian (fascist) forces and police, numbering at least 600 people. The three young friends were members of the Communist Party of Albania, which was established on 8 November 1941 and had begun with smaller detachments of 5-10 people which engaged in various acts of sabotage to the Italian forces, including antifascist propaganda in order to gain support of the masses. After an air bombardment, they rushed out of the house and managed to kill many of the quisling soldiers, but were shot down and instantly killed. The three were proclaimed People's Heroes of Albania for their act, and they are collectively known as the Three Heroes of Shkodër (Albanian: Tre heronjtë e Shkodrës).

A legendary epic, one of the most heroic episodes of our [Albanian] national liberation struggle

— Academy of Sciences of Albania on the Three Heroes of Shkodër

Jordan Misja was a painter. Kadija and Misja belonged to the Orthodox community of Shkodër, which at that time there were a few families, which all belonged to the same social level.

== Legacy ==
The "Perlat Rexhepi" partisan battalion from Shkodër operated in the Gjakovë highlands in 1943, and assisted the conference of Albanian and Yugoslav communists in the same year.

Several schools, streets and other buildings have been named after the three individuals.

- In 1946, the first middle school for art, the "Jordan Misja Artistic Lyceum", was opened in Tirana, with the branches of music, figurative arts and choreography.
- Jordan Misja High School, in Shkodër
- Prison 313, also known as "Jordan Misja Prison", in Tirana
- Branko Kadija Street (Rruga Branko Kadija), in Shkodër
- Perlat Rexhepi Street (Rruga Perlat Rexhepi), in Tirana
- Perlat Rexhepi agricultural enterprise

== See also ==
- Perlat Rexhepi in Albanian Wikipedia
- Branko Kadia in Albanian Wikipedia
