= Myslym Peza =

Albanian politician (1897–1984)

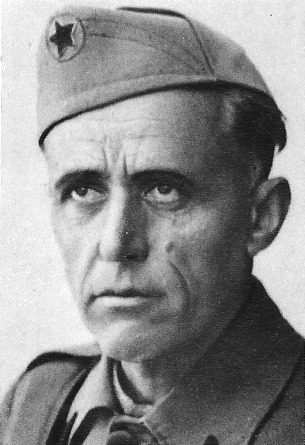
- Peza in 1944

Deputy Chairman of the Presidium of the People's Assembly
- In office 1946–1982
- Leader: Enver Hoxha (First Secretary)

Personal details
- Born: 1 May 1897 Pezë, Sanjak of Durrës, Ottoman Empire (modern Albania)
- Died: 7 February 1984 (aged 86) Tirana, PSR Albania
- Party: Party of Labour of Albania
- Awards: Hero of the People

Myslym Peza (1 May 1897 – 7 February 1984) was a distinguished World War II veteran who led the anti-fascist movement "Çeta e Pezës", the members of which founded the Communist Party of Albania.

Peza came to Albania from Yugoslavia in the summer of 1939, and immediately began anti-Italian action in his area. He received financial support from the Yugoslav authorities through his friend Haxhi Lleshi, whom he had met while in exile in Yugoslavia. In June 1940 he passed to full illegality. The Conference of Pezë was held in his home.

He served as deputy chairman of the presidium of the People's Assembly of Albania between 1946 and 1982. His name was mentioned in a CIA report of 1952 as a Yugoslavian informant, together with Haxhi Lleshi.
