= List of mayors of Tirana =

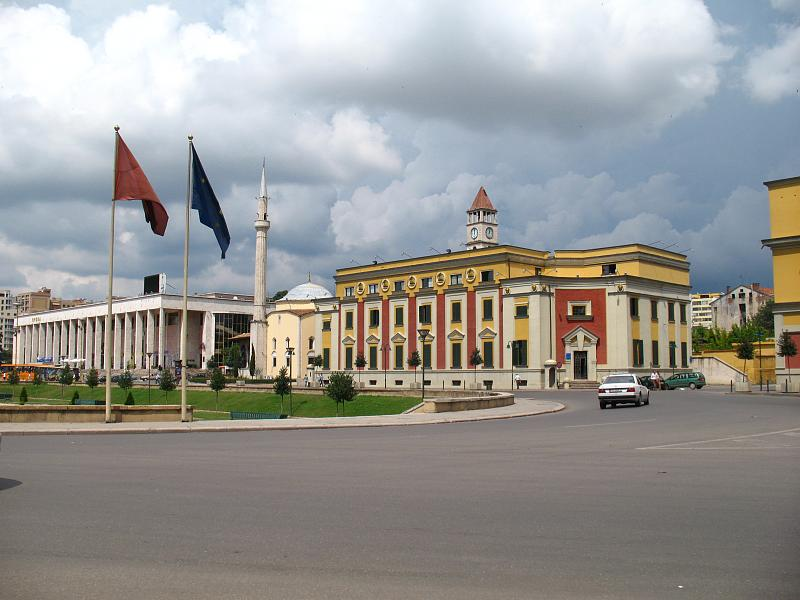
Tirana city hall on Skanderbeg square

This is a list of mayors of Tirana who have served since the Albanian Declaration of Independence of 1912.

== Mayors (1912–present) ==
No.	Name	Start	End
1	Zyber Hallulli	1913	1914
2	Servet Libohova	1915	1916
3	Ismail Ndroqi	1917	1922
4	Ali Begeja	1922	1923
5	Ali Derhemi	1923	1924
6	Beqir Rusi	1924	1924
7	Xhemal Kondi	1924	1925
8	Fuad Toptani	1925	1927
9	Izet Dibra	1927	1928
10	Rasim Kallakulla	1928	1930
11	Rexhep Jella	1930	1933
12	Abedin Nepravishta	1933	1935
13	Qemal Butka	1935	1936
14	Abedin Nepravishta	1937	1939
15	Qazim Mulleti	1939	1940
16	Ali Erëbara	1940	1942
17	Omer Fortuzi	1942	1943
18	Halil Meniku	1943	1944
19	Llazar Treska	1944	1945
20	Ali Bakiu	1945	1947
21	Ibrahim Sina	1947	1949
22	Isuf Keçi	1950	1951
23	Sabri Pilkati	1951	1951
24	Peço Kagjini	1951	1952
25	Sami Gjebero	1953	1954
26	Ibrahim Sina	1954	1955
27	Sami Gjebero	1956	1957
28	Rifat Dedja	1958	1960
29	Rexhep Guma	1960	1961
30	Sabri Pilkati	1961	1962
31	Rifat Dedja	1962	1964
32	Sabri Pilkati	1965	1966
33	Abdyl Këllezi	1967	1969
34	Myqerem Fuga	1970	1973
35	Ndue Marashi	1974	1975
36	Nesip Ibrahimi	1976	1983
37	Pjetër Kosta	1983	1984
38	Jashar Menzelxhiu	1984	1985
39	Llambi Gegprifti	1986	1987
40	Leandro Zoto	1987	1989
41	Llambi Gegprifti	1989	1990
42	Tomor Malasi	1991	1992
43	Sali Kelmendi	1992	1996
44	Albert Brojka	1996	2000
45	Edi Rama	2000	2011
46	Lulzim Basha	2011	2015
47	Erion Veliaj (suspended)	2015	2025
–	Anuela Ristani (acting)	2025	2025
(47)	Erion Veliaj (reinstated)	2025	incumbent

== See also ==
- Politics of Albania
