= Dedja =

Dedja is a surname of Albanian origin. Notable people with the surname include:

- Bashkim Dedja (born 1970), Albanian jurist
- Edlira Dedja, Albanian musician
- Hysen Dedja (born 1960), Albanian footballer and manager
- Rifat Dedja, Albanian politician
