= Vuno =

Albanian settlement

- Village
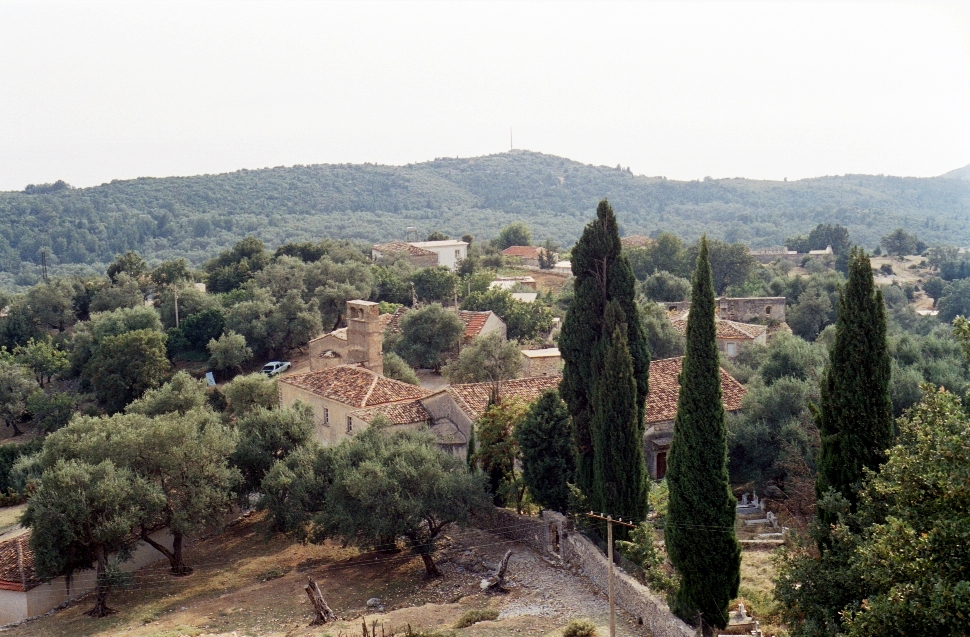

- Location within Albania
- Coordinates: 40°08′28″N 19°41′37″E
- Country: Albania
- County: Vlorë
- Municipality: Himarë
- Administrative unit: Himarë

Population
  - Total: 486
- Demonym: Vunjot/ëse
- Time zone: UTC+1 (CET)
  - Summer (DST): UTC+2 (CEST)

Vuno is a village in the municipality of Himarë, Vlorë County, Albania. It is situated along the road that connects the center of Himarë with the village of Dhërmi on the Albanian Riviera. The population of Vuno is exclusively composed of Orthodox Albanians.

== Name ==
The village's name derives from the Greek word Vouno (Greek: Βουνό), meaning 'mountain', reflecting its location on hills that rise to approximately 300 metres (980 ft).

== History ==
In 1628, Neophytos Rodinos, a Catholic missionary, founded a school in Vuno with the aim of converting the Greek Orthodox population of Himarë to Catholicism. In 1632, an Albanian school was established in the village.

In 1720, the villages of Himarë, Palasë, Ilias, Vuno, Pilur, and Qeparo refused to submit to the Pasha of Delvinë.

According to Giuseppe Schirò, an Italian missionary who wrote in 1722, Vuno was inhabited by Albanians.

In 1873, a Greek school in Vuno had 80 pupils. Greek education expanded in the following years, and by the 1898–1899 school year, the village had three schools: a primary school, a secondary school, and a girls' school. Education was funded by various notable individuals and members of the diaspora from Vuno and neighboring settlements. These schools ceased operations in 1913.

Greek classes in Vuno were conducted in an imposing building. However, after the village was incorporated into the newly established Principality of Albania, state policy prohibited Greek-language education.

In November 1912, during the First Balkan War, Himara revolted under Spyros Spyromilios and expelled the Ottoman forces. On 6 November 1912, Vuno was captured by the Greek military under Stylianos Galeros.

After the Albanian Declaration of Independence in Vlorë on 28 November, Himarë came under constant attack from Albanian forces, but they were unable to regain control of the area. The region remained under Greek control until the end of the Balkan Wars.

The Himara region came under the control of the Albanian state. In 1921, the "Himara question" arose concerning the rights of the Himariots and their villages, including Dhërmi, Vuno, Himarë, Pilur, Kudhës, and Qeparo. The matter was overseen by Spiro Jorgo Koleka, a representative of the Albanian government.

The government decided that Albanian would be the compulsory language in schools as the official language, while Greek could be taught as a second language if the local population desired.

Spiro Koleka, a native of Vuno and a prominent figure in the Albanian national movement, opposed the annexation of the Himara region and the wider Vlora area by foreign powers. He played a key role in organizing the Vlora War, in which other local Himariots also participated.

After the region was incorporated into Albania in the 1920s, the people of Vuno continued to maintain their Greek school. Between 1934 and 1936, they petitioned for the continuation of Greek-language education in their village. However, their request was ultimately denied by the Albanian state authorities.

During the Greco-Italian War, in December 1940, Italian forces successfully repelled a Greek attack on Bënçë, Vuno, and Bolenë. On 15 January 1941, they again defended Vuno against a Greek assault, while Greek forces launched an attack on the Dishnicë region. A military cemetery commemorating the fallen Greek soldiers is maintained at Scutara.

During the Second World War, several locals from Vuno joined the Albanian National Liberation Army as guerrilla fighters. Three of them—Zaho Koka, Kozma Nushi, and Llambro Andoni—were posthumously awarded the title of "People's Hero of Albania".

The village monument bears the names of several participants, including Arqile Vjero, Amali Andoni, Eftihi Baka, Foto Goxho, Herkole Koleka, Irakli Thani, Llambro Sheti, Kleomen A. Ndrenika, Niqita Andoni, Naço Koço, Pano Dhimegjoka, Pilo Varfi, Stefo Cura, and Thoma Simo. Vuno was also a central location where Greek Himariotes were organized into the Albanian National Liberation Army.

During the civil unrest in Albania in 1997, an armed group established a roadblock between Himarë and Vuno.

During his fieldwork, anthropologist V. Nitsiakos (2010) observed that the community takes pride in its strong Orthodox Christian identity. They also harbor friendly feelings towards Greece, with their pro-Greek attitude possibly linked to employment opportunities in the country. Additionally, members of the community receive Greek pensions as Hellenes, even though they never refer to themselves as Greeks. Instead, they identify as North Epirotes or Orthodox, without denying their true Albanian national identity, a common stance among many Orthodox Albanians.

== Architecture and churches ==
The village has several churches, but they are currently not in use due to the absence of priests.

One of the churches, located on Jali Beach, dates back to the 14th century and is built in the Venetian style. Two other churches, the St. Spyridon's Church (Albanian: Kisha e Shën Spiridhonit) (1778) and the Church of St. Mary (1783), are relatively well-preserved.

According to local legend, the inhabitants of the village originally came from the city of Shkodër and moved to Vuno, where they built the Church of St. Mary. The church, which was originally Catholic, is still well-preserved and located in a prominent spot in the village known as Scutara. The name "Scutara" may reflect the Byzantine military traditions of the Pronoia, which were well known in the area. The church was later converted into an Orthodox church.

== Attractions ==
During the summer months, the beaches of Vuno and Himarë are the main tourist attractions in the municipality. The beach of Jaliskari (or Jali), located between Vuno and Dhërmi, has become a popular summer resort, attracting tourists from around the world.

== Identity and language ==
Vuno is a village inhabited by Albanian Orthodox Christians who take pride in their strong religious identity. The local dialect spoken in Vuno is the southern Tosk dialect, specifically a sub-dialect of Labërisht, which consists of non-unified language groups. The older population of the village is monolingual in Albanian, while some of the younger generation also speak Greek due to migration to Greece.

== Gallery ==
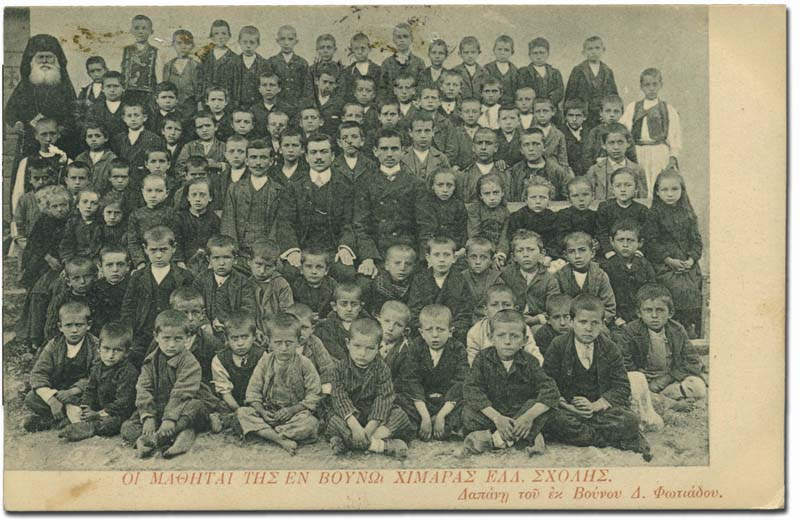
Pupils and teachers of the Greek School of Vuno in 1909

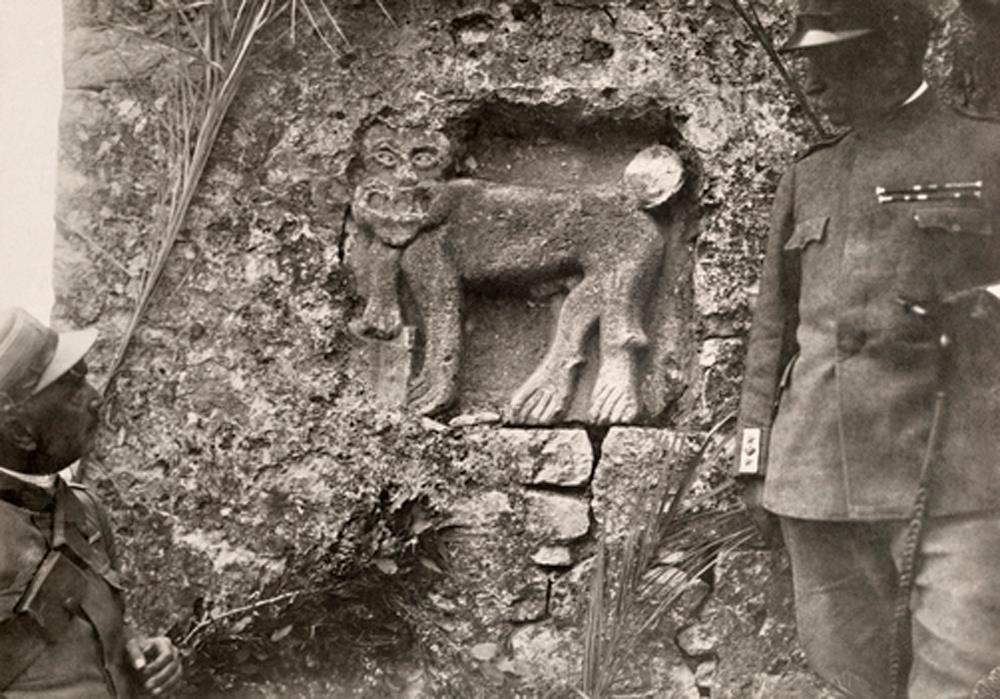
Venetian Saint Mark Lion from the Middle Ages, photo taken in Vuno 1918

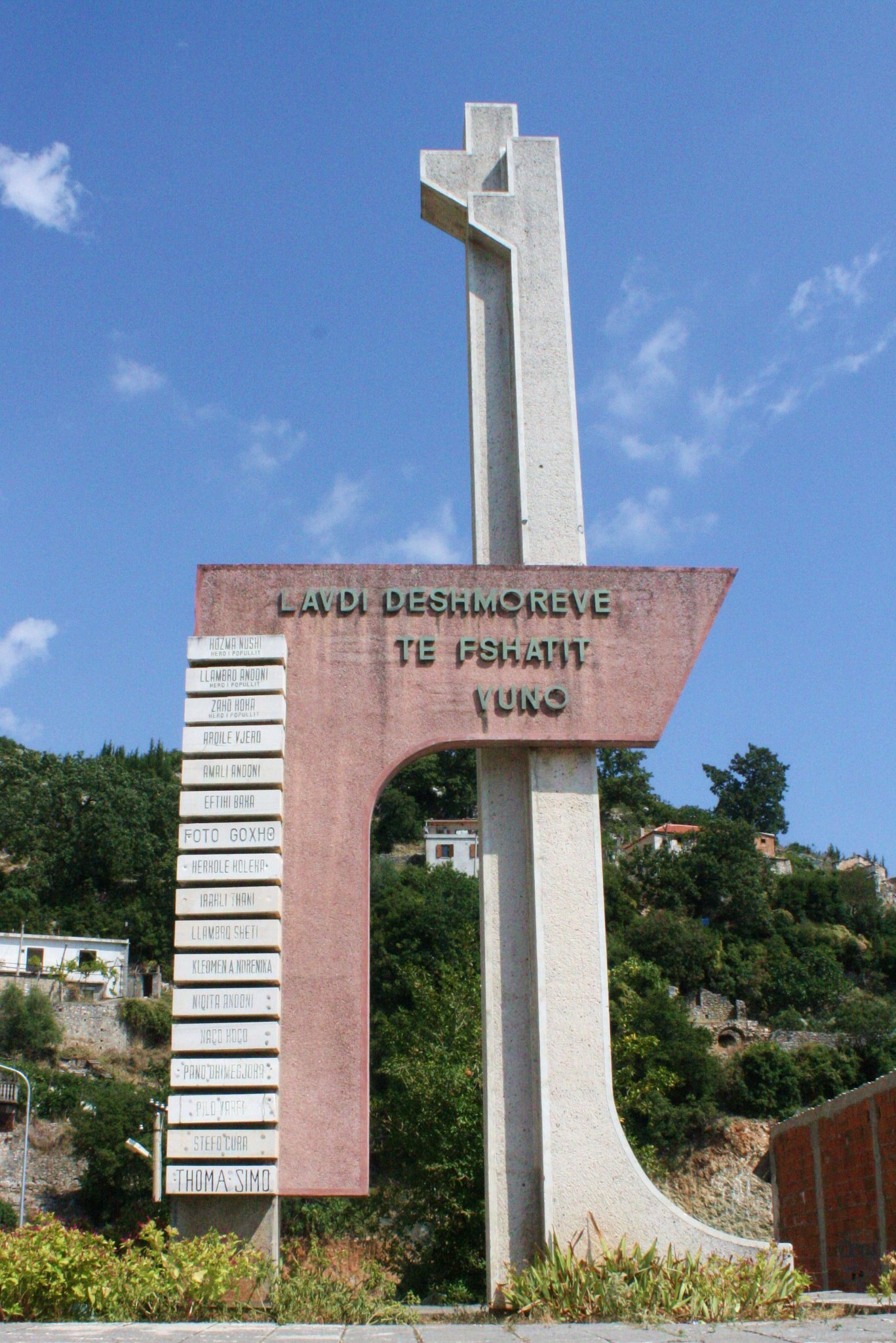
The Memorial of Vuno

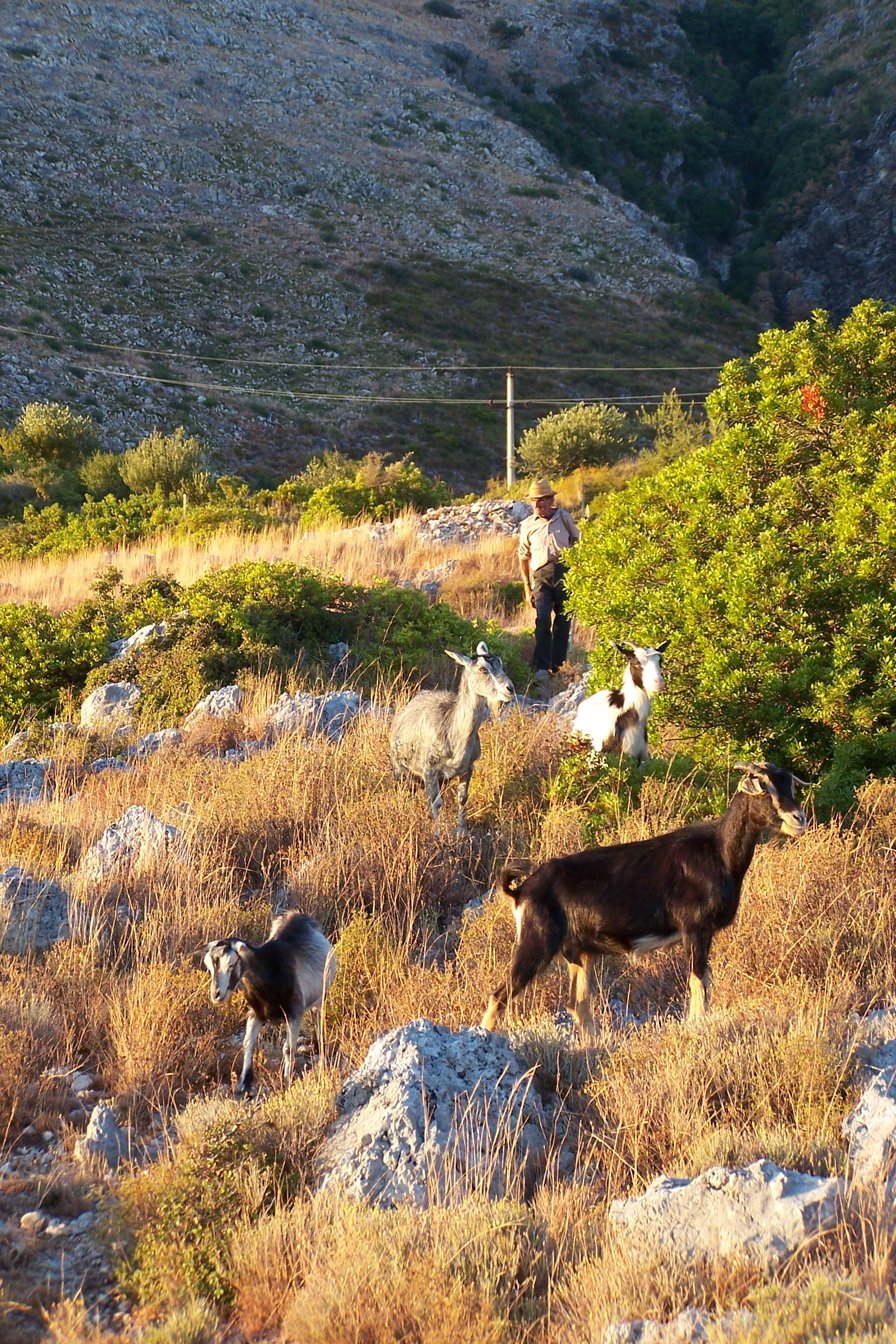
Goatherd shepherd in Vuno

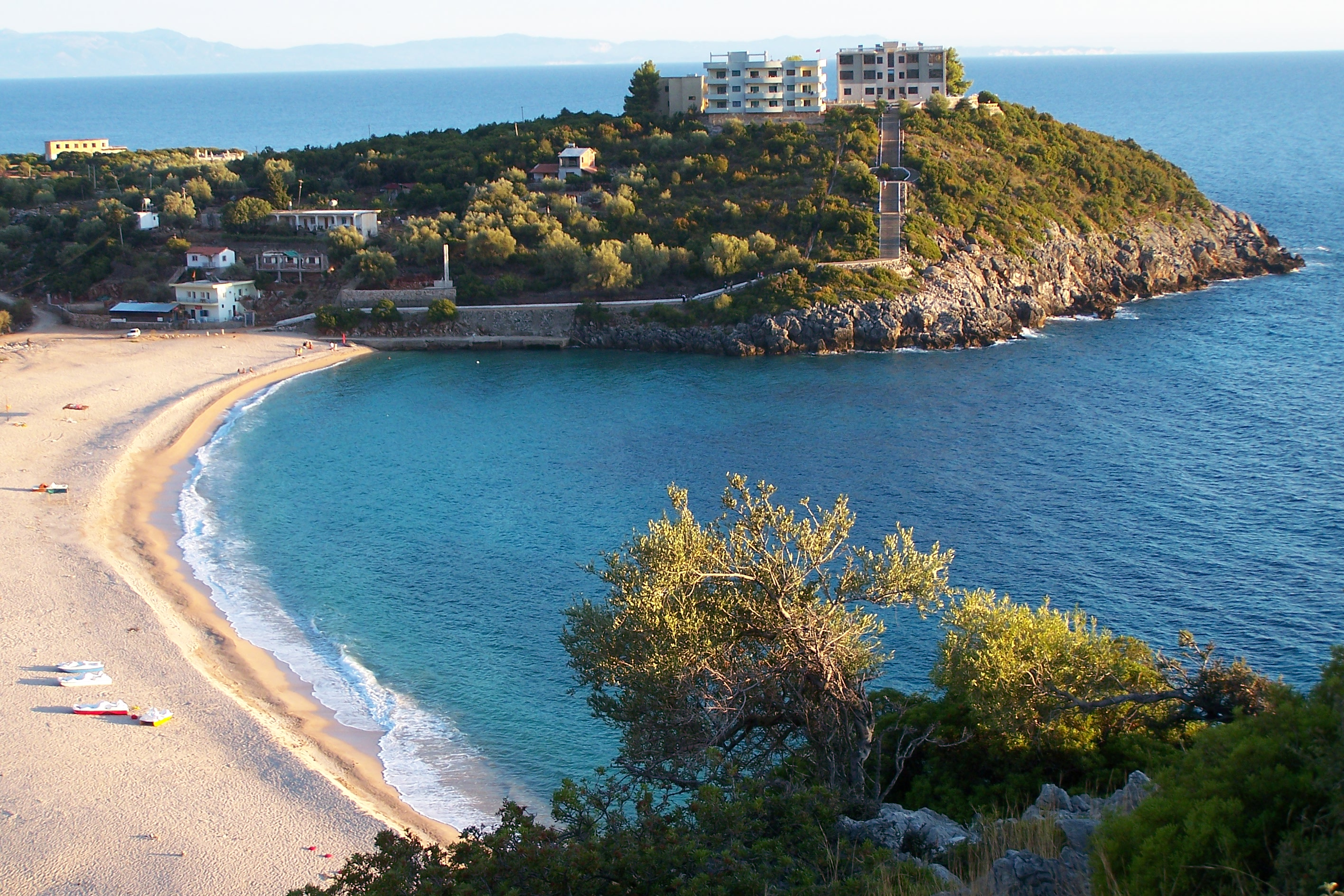
Jal or Jali beach next to Vuno

== Notable people ==
- Dhimitër Anagnosti, Albanian cineast, and former Minister of Culture, Youth and Sports
- Odhise Grillo, Albanian writer
- Zaho Koka, member of Albanian Albanian National Liberation Movement
- Spiro Jorgo (Gogo) Koleka (1879 or 1880–1940) prominent Albanian politician and activist
- Spiro Koleka, (1908 – 2001) Albanian communist politician and a partisan
- Anastas Kondo, Albanian writer
- Sofokli Lazri, counselor of Enver Hoxha and writer
- Robert Ndrenika, Albanian actor
- Gogo Nushi, Albanian political figure and World War II hero
- Athanasios Pipis (−1821), revolutionary of the Greek War of Independence
- Leandro Zoto, Albanian politician and former mayor of Tirana
