= Irfan Ceklkupa =

Albanian politician

Irfan Ceklkupa was an Albanian politician and mayor of Tirana from 1957 through 1958.
