= Jashar Mezenxhiu =

Albanian politician and mayor

Jashar Mezenxhiu was an Albanian politician and mayor of Tirana from 1984 to 1985.
