= Zaho (given name) =

Zaho is a given name of Arabic origin.

People with the name Zaho include:

- Zaho (born 1980), Algerian-Canadian R&B singer
- Zaho de Sagazan (born 1999), French singer-songwriter and musician
- Zaho Koka (1920–1944), Albanian World War II partisan
