= Rauf Fico =

Albanian diplomat and politician

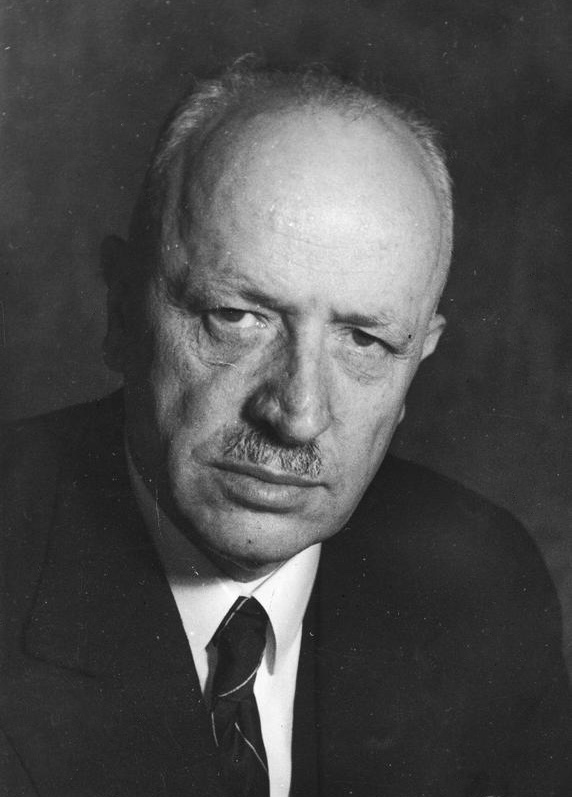

Minister of Foreign Affairs
- In office April 19, 1929 – April 20, 1931

Minister of Internal Affairs (acting)
- In office December 12, 1921 – December 24, 1921

Personal details
- Born: March 13, 1881 Sanaa, Vilayet of Yemen, Ottoman Empire
- Died: January 23, 1944 (aged 62) Tirana, Albanian Kingdom

Abdurrauf Fico (March 13, 1881 – January 23, 1944), also known as Rauf Fitso Bey, was an Albanian ambassador and politician.

== Early life ==
Rauf Fico was born in Sanaa, to Tahmaz Fico of the Fico family of Gjirokastër and Hava Buzo from Berat. After finishing high school in Shkodra, he continued his studies in Vienna and later at the Mekteb-i Mülkiye.

== Political career ==
In 1912, Fico joined Vlorë's government as a councillor in the Ministry of the Interior. In 1916, he served as vice-prefect of Tirana. During his tenure as vice-prefect, Fico, along with co-founders Zyber Hallulli, Mytesim Këlliçi, Luigj Shala, and Xhelal Toptani, co-founded Streha Vorfnore, the city's first public orphanage on November 28, 1917, the date of the fifth anniversary of the Albanian Declaration of Independence. In 1918, he was one of the initiators of the Congress of Tirana—together with Abdi Toptani and Ismail Ndroqi—which along with the Congress of Durrës later that same year, established the continuity of the newly created Albanian state after World War I. Fico then served as Minister of Interior Affairs in Pandeli Evangjeli's cabinet in 1921 and served two terms as deputy of Durrës. His political career culminated in 1929 with a 19-month appointment as Foreign Minister of Albania—a post he was removed from in 1930 for his opposition to the Fascist Italian regime.

== Ambassadorships ==
Fico first served as an ambassador to Turkey and Bulgaria in the late 1920s, before his time as Foreign Minister of Albania. He then served as ambassador to Yugoslavia (1933–36), Greece (1937) and Germany (1938-9), where Fico helped dozens of Jewish people escape the country on Albanian tourist visas.

== Internment and death ==
During the Italian invasion of Albania, Fico was arrested and interned in Italy. He died in Tirana on January 23, 1944, a few months after he returned from Italy following the country's capitulation.

== Orders, decorations, and honors ==
Throughout his political and diplomatic career Fico had been awarded various orders:

- Grand Cordon of Order of Franz Joseph.
- Grand Cordon of Order of Leopold.
- Grand Cordon of Order of the Crown of Romania.
- Grand Cordon of Order of the Crown of Italy.
- Grand Cordon of Order of the Phoenix (Greece).
- Grand Cordon of the Luxemburg Crown.
- Officer of Order of Skanderbeg
- Officier of the French Legion of Honor.
- Palm of French Academy.
- Order of Boris, Bulgaria.
- Doctor Honoris Causa of Naples Academy
