= Kadri Gjata =

Albanian writer (1865–1912)

Kadri Gjata (1865–1912) was an Albanian patriot, writer, and educator. He was posthumously awarded the Honor of the Nation (Nderi i Kombit in Albanian) medal and the title Martyr of the Nation.

Kadri Gjata was born in Libohovë in 1865. After finishing his secondary education in Janina he studied law in Istanbul. In 1905 he created the patriotic organization Unity (Bashkimi in Albanian) in Janina. In Janina he started publishing the Albanian journal Zgjimi i Shqipërisë. In 1910 he established the Albanian organization Toskëria and an Albanian-language school in Janina.

He was assassinated by a group of 22 Greek agents on the night of July 12, 1912.

He was honoured with the title Martyr of the Nation. A school in Delvinë was renamed in his honour in the 2000s and in 2003 he was posthumously awarded with the medal Honour of the Nation (Nderi i Kombit), one of the highest medals in Albania.

== Bibliography ==
- Enciklopedia Jugshqiptare, p. 781–83, 2006
- The development of Islamic culture among Albanians during the 20th century, p. 252
- Awards of the medal Honour of the Nation
