= Leandro Zoto =

Albanian politician and mayor

Leandro Zoto (born 1935) was an Albanian politician and mayor of Tirana from 1987 through 1988, precisely Chairman of the Executive Committee of the People's Council of Tirana. He has two sons, Edvin and Artur, with his wife Anastasia. He was born in Vuno.
