= Ali Begeja =

Albanian politician

Ali Begeja

Ali Begeja (1888–1947) was an Albanian politician. He served as mayor of Tiranë in 1922–23 and as deputy of Durrës in 1924 and 1937–40.

"Begeja" family is one of the oldest authentic Tirana's families, having settled since in late 18th century. They originated in Kruje neighborhood of Begeja, and moved to Tirana after the Toptani family seized power.
Ali Begeja was lawyer by profession. In 1908, he participated in a commission led by Refik Toptani for spreading the Albanian language. In 1910, he participated in the Third Congress of Monastir as a delegate of Tirana. From 1911 to 1914 he served as a judge. As a supporter of Prince Wied, he received the medal for "Faith and Unity" (Alb:Besë e Bashkim).
Begeja participated in the Congress of Lushnje as a delegate of "Drita" cultural-patriotic society of Tirana. He server as a mayor during 1922–1923. In 1924, he was elected in the National Assembly as a representative of Tirana District. In 1927, he served as Chairman of the Chamber of Commerce. In 1937, he was elected again in the Albanian Parliament as a representative of Durres District.
Begeja worked as a lawyer until 1947 when the Communist regime arrested him as part of the alleged "enemy of the people" Group of Representatives (Alb: Grupi i deputetëve). Dur to the harsh conditions and the tortures, he died in prison in 1947.

One of the streets in the old part of Tirana (Selvia) is named after him.
