= Ismail Ndroqi =

Albanian politician and philosopher

Ismail Ndroqi

Ismail Ndroqi (1876 – 5 March 1944) was an Albanian politician and philosopher. He was the mayor of Tirana from 1917 to 1922.

== Life ==
Born in 1876 in Tirana, capital of modern Albania, he came from a family that was active in the Albanian Revolt of 1843–1844 and that of 1847. After finishing his studies in the Madrasah ǧāmiʿah of Istanbul, he returned to Albania. A supporter of Ismail Qemali, he was one of the local leaders of Tirana during the Declaration of Independence of Albania. Ndroqi's support of Qemali invoked the hostility of Essad Pasha Toptani, who in order to decrease Ndroqi's influence, arranged for him to be reappointed as mufti of Shijak in 1913 and Kavajë in 1914. In 1916 he was elected mayor of Tirana, replacing Servet Libohova, a post Ndroqi held from 1917 to 1922. During his term as mayor, several schools and the first hospital and orphanage of the city were founded.
Ndroqi was an initiator of the Congress of Tirana (19–20 December 1818) and a delegate in the Durrës Congress (25–27 December 1918). He also founded the volunteer battalion of Tirana, which took part in the Vlora War against the Italian army. Ndroqi's term as a mayor of Tirana was the longest until the establishment of the Socialist People's Republic of Albania after World War II.

In 1928 he resigned from politics and focused on his theological studies, denouncing Islamic fundamentalism and obscurantism. From 1928 to 1939 he also served as the mufti of Durrës.

His son Shefqet Ndroqi is regarded as the father of pulmonology in Albania, and a hospital in Tirana has been renamed for him, while he is also an honorary citizen of the city. Ndroqi's grandson Zamir is also a doctor.
