= Sami Gjebero =

Albanian politician

Sami Gjebero was an Albanian politician and mayor of Tirana from 1953 through 1954 and 1956 through 1957.
