= Sabri Pilkati =

Albanian politician and mayor

Sabri Pilkati was an Albanian politician and mayor of Tirana in 1951, again from 1961-1962, and for a third time in 1965-1966.
