= Libohovë =

- Municipality
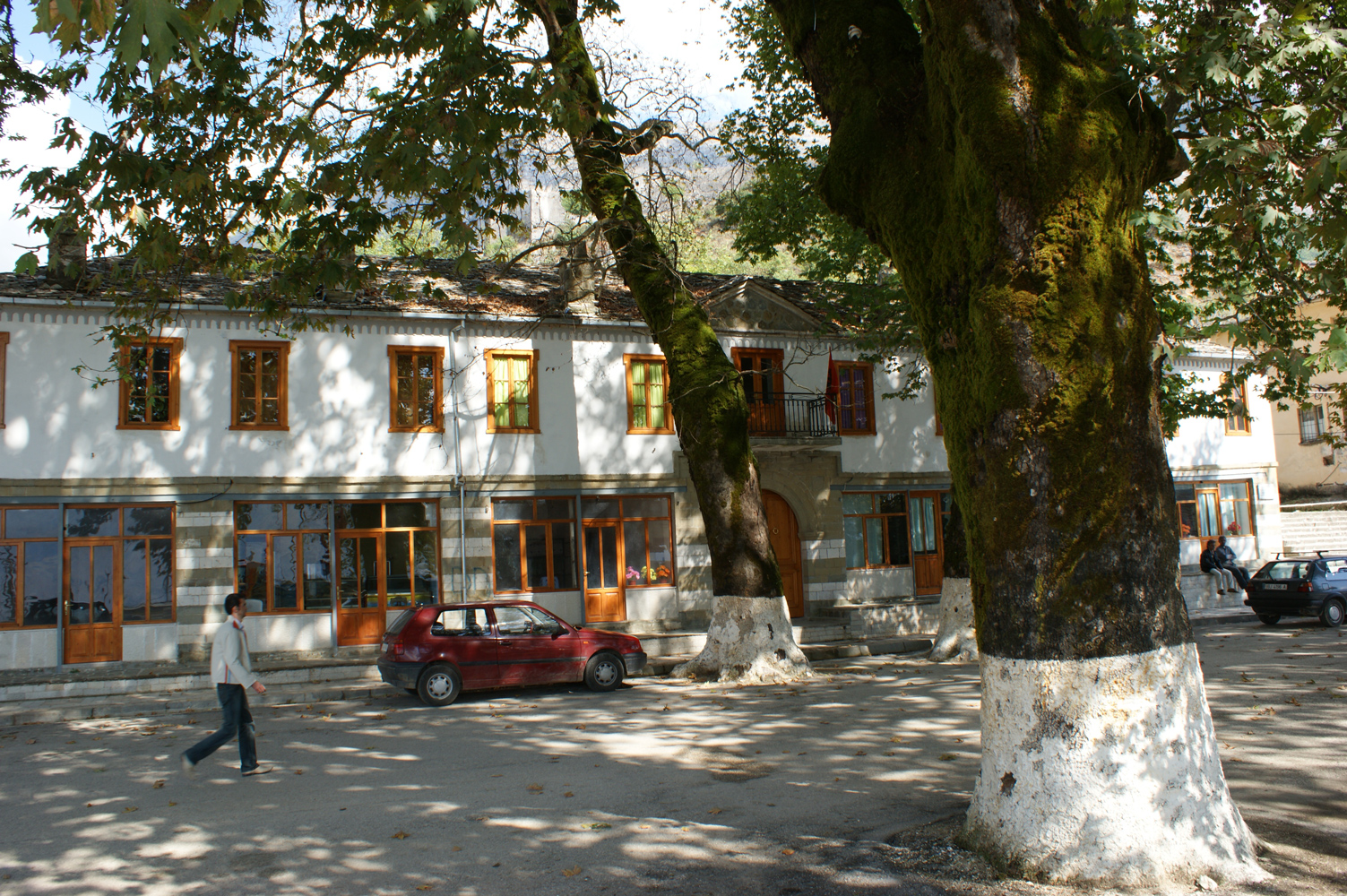
- Main street of Libohovë

- Emblem

- Location within Albania
- Coordinates: 40°2′N 20°16′E
- Country: Albania
- County: Gjirokastër

Government
  - Mayor: Leonard Hide (PS)

Area
  - Municipality: 248.42 km^{2} (95.92 sq mi)
- Elevation: 408 m (1,339 ft)

Population (2011)
  - Municipality: 3,667
  - Municipality density: 14.76/km^{2} (38.23/sq mi)
  - Administrative unit: 1,992
- Time zone: UTC+1 (CET)
  - Summer (DST): UTC+2 (CEST)
- Postal Code: 6003
- Area Code: (0)881
- Website: www.bashkialibohove.gov.al

Libohovë (Albanian definite form: Libohova) is a town and a municipality in southern Albania. It is overlooked by Libohovë Castle and has a main street with views across the Drino valley. Libohovë is at the foot of the Bureto Mountain. The region forms part of the Zagori Regional Nature Park located in Zagori region.

The municipality was formed at the 2015 local government reform by the merger of the former municipalities Libohovë, Qendër Libohovë and Zagori, that became municipal units. The seat of the municipality is the town Libohovë. The total population is 3,667 (2011 census), in a total area of 248.42 km^{2}. The population of the former municipality at the 2011 census was 1,992.

== History ==
The archaeological evidence indicates a very ancient settlement which reached its zenith in the seventeenth century. It may be the exact site of present Dropull's former Catholic Diocese of Hadrianopolis in Epiro. In the late seventeenth century, the Ottoman traveler Evliya Çelebi passed through Libohovë noting it was inhabited by Muslim Albanians and had 200 houses, a mosque, prayer house, inn and small bathhouse. Between 1796 and 1798 the Libohovë Castle was built in the city. In the early nineteenth century during the rule of Ali Pasha, British diplomat William Martin Leake during his journey from Vlorë to Gjirokastra and later to present-day Greece, in his diary describes his arrival on December 26, 1804, in the region of Derópoli, or Dropull as it was known from the local Albanians. According to him, Libohovë, then part of the same region, numbered about 1000 Muslim families and 100 Christian families.

During the interwar period (twentieth century) Libohovë was a well-watered, large and wealthy settlement located among extensive groves containing 500 houses, its inhabitants spoke Albanian and were mostly Muslim. Libohovë was a centre for the Muslim Sufi Bektashi order with several tekkes located in Dropull. As of 2003, members of the Greek minority also lived in the town. Muslims formed most of Libohovë's population in the late twentieth century. A small settlement, Libohovë is a centre of Sufi Bektashism.

== Places of interest ==
- Libohovë Castle is the most visited site in town.
- Myfit Bej Libohova's home is located in the centre of the town.

== Notable locals ==
- Eni Çobani, lawyer
- Kadri Gjata, (1865–1912) was an Albanian patriot, writer, and educator. He was posthumously awarded the Honor of the Nation (Nderi i Kombit in Albanian) medal and the title Martyr of the Nation.
- Myfit Libohova, Albanian government member on nine occasions from 1912 until his death in 1927, holding the positions of Justice Minister, Minister of the Interior, Minister of Finance, and Minister of Foreign Affairs. He was also the founder of the Bank of Albania.
- Servet Libohova, former mayor of Tiranë
- Abedin Nepravishta, twice former mayor of Tirana, Albania, during 1933–1935 and 1937–1939
- Avni Rustemi, leftist activist of the 1920s.
- Nexhmie Zaimi, Albanian American author and journalist
- Eranda Libohova, Albanian Singer
- Javer Hurshiti was an Albanian military and political figure, he was the son of Maliq Pasha Libohova.
