= St. Spyridon's Church =

Cultural monument of Albania

- Kisha e Shën Spiridonit (Albanian)
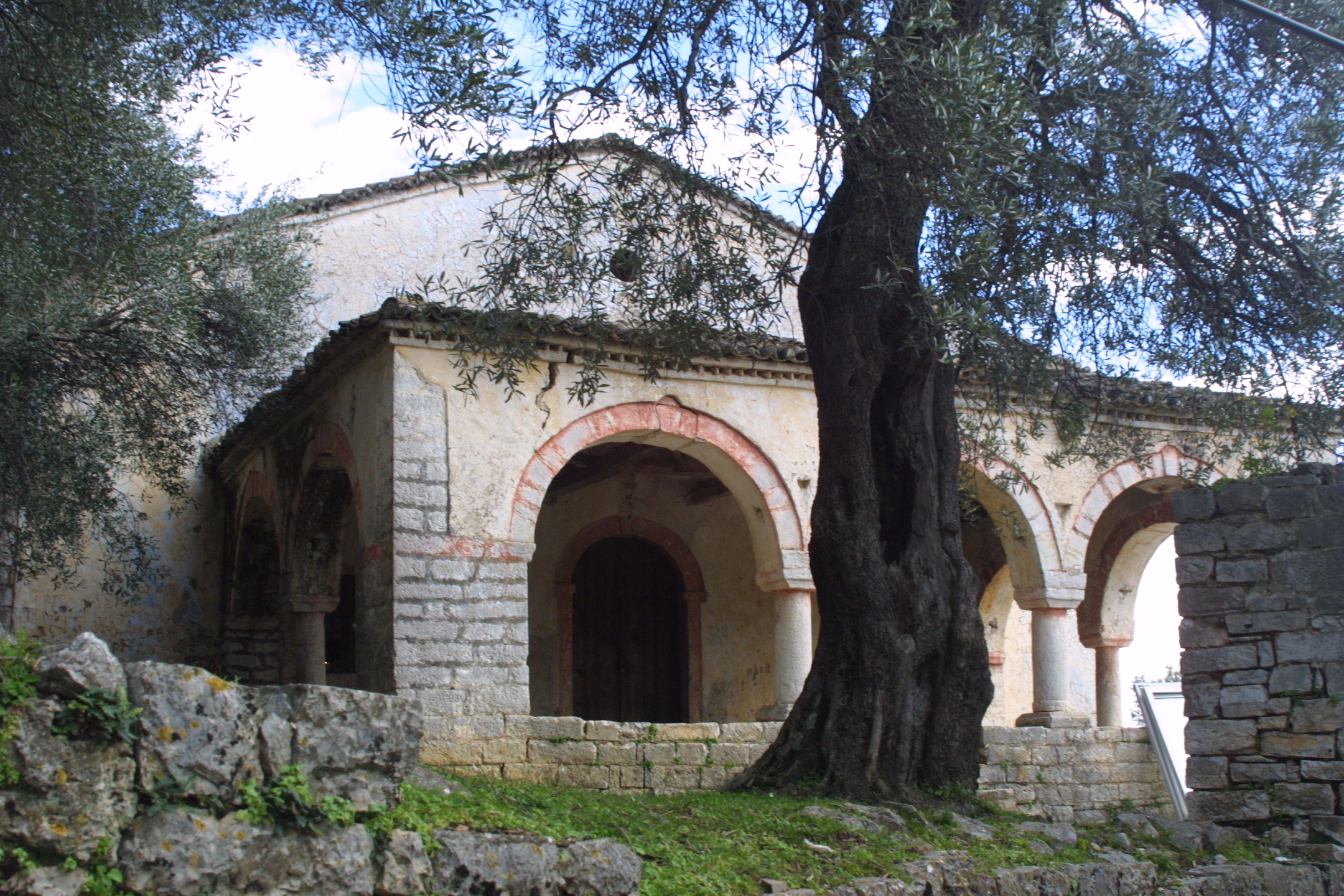
- Interactive map of St. Spyridon's Church
- 40°08′17″N 19°41′43″E
- Location: Vuno

Cultural Monument of Albania

St. Spyridon's Church (Albanian: Kisha e shën Spiridonit) is an Albanian Orthodox church in Vuno, Vlorë County, Albania. It is a Cultural Monument of Albania.
