= 1992 Albanian local elections =

1992 Albanian Local Elections
- 26 July 1992

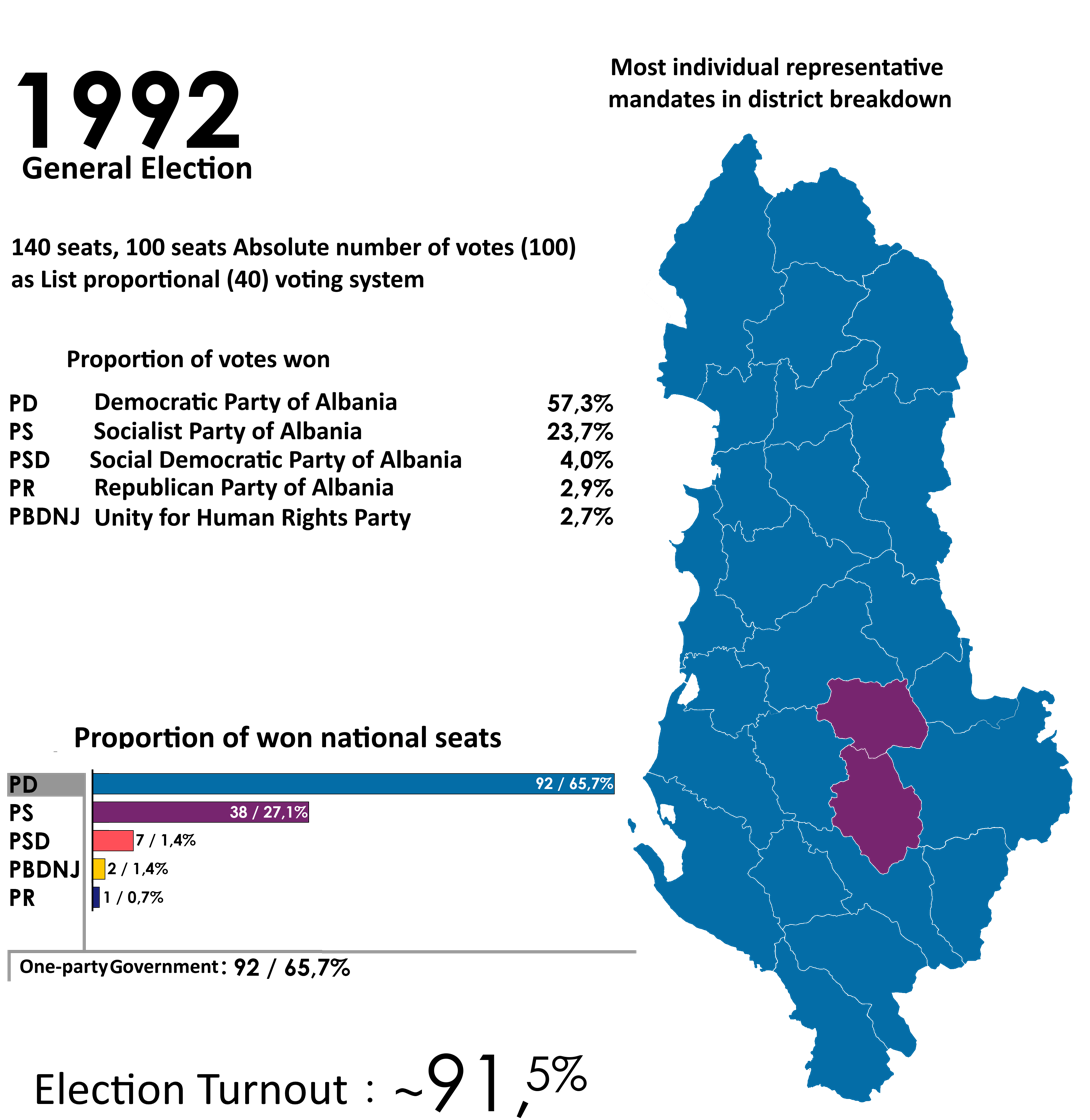
Albanian elections 1992

The Albanian local elections in 1992 was the first local election held in Albania. The elections were held on 26 July 1992 and the general winner was the coalition Socialist Party of Albania with 49.87% of the vote. The Democratic Party of Albania however, won in capital of Tirana.

== Results ==
The Democratic party received fewer votes alone compared to its government coalition. However, The Democrats won in Berat, Elbasan, Fier, Lushnjë, Durrës, Vlorë, Shkodër, and Tirana. The winner in Tirana would be Sali Kelmendi. The Socialists and their Left Wing Coalition would win in the Lezhë, Gjirokastër, Peshkopi, Fier, Kukës. About 9% of the votes were invalid. Voter Turnout was at 70.65%

Results of votes for the municipality and municipal councils
Party	Leader	Votes	Percentage of Votes	Coalitions	Leader	Votes	Percentage of Votes
Socialist Party	Fatos Nano	340,266	45.43%	Government coalition	Sali Berisha	644,872	51.35%
Democratic Party	Sali Berisha	278,101	37.13%	Left wing coalition	Fatos Nano	535,713	42.66%
Social Democratic Party	Skënder Gjinushi	40,065	5.35%	Others/independents	–	75,222	5.99%
Republican Party	Sabri Godo	33,726	4.50%				
Unity for Human Rights Party	Vangjel Dule	33,223	4.44%				
Others/independents	–	23,590	3.15%				
