= Ndue Marashi =

Albanian politician and mayor

Mayor of Tirana
- In office 1970–1974

Personal details
- Born: 1933 Shkodër County
- Died: 16 December 1975 (aged 41–42)

Ndue Marashi (1933 – 16 December 1975) was an Albanian politician and mayor of Tirana from 1973 through 1975.

He was born in the outskirts of Shkodër. His cause of death was reportedly a suicide.
