= Abedin Nepravishta =

Albanian politician

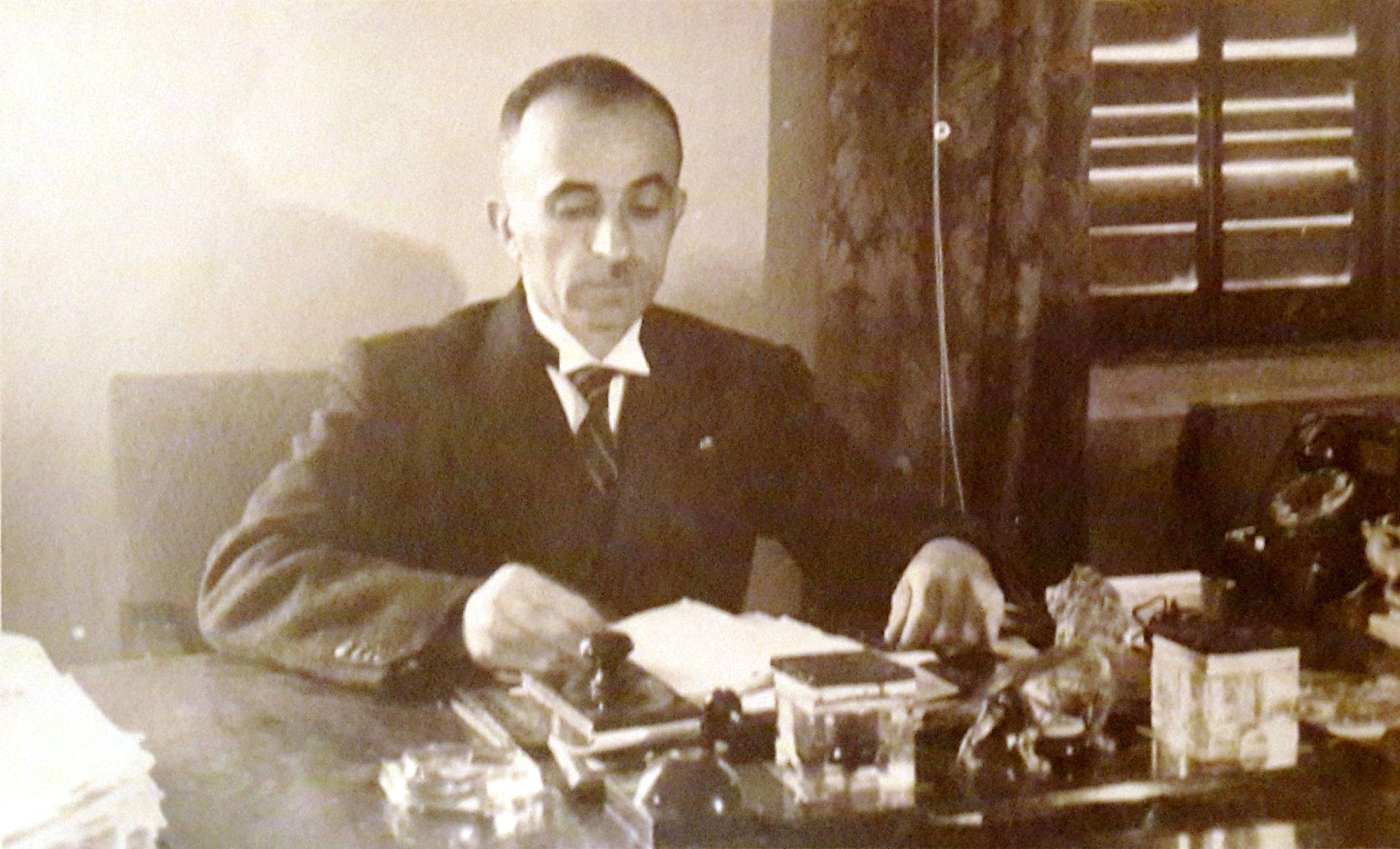

Abedin Nepravishta (19 September 1889 – 1975) was an Albanian politician. He was twice mayor of Tirana, in 1933–1935 and 1937–1939.

== Biography ==
Nepravishta was born on 19 September 1889 in Kuç. His parents then moved to Libohovë. He went everywhere including to Istanbul to follow the Imperial School of High Administration. He has served as major in different districts in Albania (Shkodër, Durrës, Elbasan, Korçë, Dibër) under the reign of King Zog of Albania.

He was the major who approved the first modern urbanistic city plan of Tirana as a capital city, designed by Arch. Armando Brasini, and began its application on site. He settled modern day's Tirana urbanistic plan, the plan which is still being applied today.

He was a member of the Organizing Committee of the January 1920 Congress of Lushnjë.

He died in 1975 in Fier.
