= Spyros Spyromilios =

Greek Gendarmerie officer and guerrilla fighter

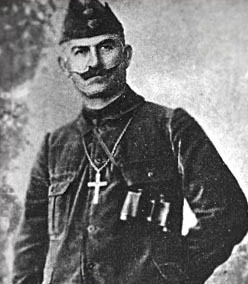
- Spyromilios c. 1915.
- Native name: Σπύρος Σπυρομήλιος
- Nickname: Eagle of Himarra (Ο Αϊτός της Χειμάρρας)
- Born: c. 1864; Himarra, Sanjak of Delvina, Ottoman Empire (now Albania)
- Died: 19 May 1930 Athens, Second Hellenic Republic
- Buried: First Cemetery of Athens
- Allegiance: Kingdom of Greece; Aut. Rep. of Northern Epirus; (Greece) Second Hellenic Republic
- Branch: Hellenic Gendarmerie; Hellenic Army
- Service years: 1896–1926
- Rank: Colonel
- Commands: Civil Governor and Military Commander of Himarra (1914)
- Conflicts: Greco-Turkish War (1897); Macedonian Struggle; Balkan Wars: First Balkan War; Himarra Revolt; North Epirote Struggle
- Other work: Member of the Ethniki Etaireia; Member of the Greek Parliament (1915–1917)

Spyros Spyromilios (Greek: Σπύρος Σπυρομήλιος; c. 1864–1930) was a Greek Gendarmerie officer and guerrilla fighter who took part in the Greco-Turkish War of 1897, the Greek Struggle for Macedonia, and the Balkan Wars. In 1914 he proclaimed the Autonomy of his native town, Himarë, and joined the autonomist struggle of Northern Epirus against its inclusion within the newly established Principality of Albania.

== Early life ==
Spyromilios was born in Himarë, then Ottoman Empire, to a historical family of the region. He entered a naval school in Kephalonia and had the privilege to visit many European ports. He applied to study at the School of Naval Trials, however, was declined entry because he has over 19 years of age. By the recommendation of his relative, Ioannis Spyromilios, who was a gendarme commander, he enlisted in the Hellenic Gendarmerie in 1883 where he would soon become an officer.

== Career ==
=== Greco-Turkish War of 1897 ===
Spyromilios had been a member of the Ethniki Etaireia nationalist organization prior to the war and upon its outbreak, was placed as the head of its volunteer corps. He acted as the force commander of 67 gendarmes on the Epirus front and was in the battles around Preveza and Nikopolis. Having made a name for himself within the Ethniki Etaireia, he was later commissioned to care for refugees from Crete following the Cretan Revolt (1897–1898).

=== Macedonian Struggle ===
Spyromilios, who had now held the rank of Lieutenant, entered the service of the Hellenic Macedonian Committee and began his work with the Greek Consulate General of Thessaloniki in 1904. He and the group of Cretans which he had recruited, began operation in the Kilkis regional unit, however, in the early days of 1905 he would return to Greece with other officers to reorganize their armed bands. In May 1905, he re-entered Macedonia with one of the first armed groups from the free Kingdom of Greece to be assembled for the developing Macedonian Struggle. Adopting the nom de guerre "Athalis Bouas" or "Kapetan Bouas", he led his own group of 35 men in the region of Vermio in collaboration with band of another Makedonomachos, Konstantinos Mazarakis-Ainian (Kapetan Akritas). He was however wounded in his left leg within days, in an exchange of fire with pro-Bulgarian Komitadjis. He was forced to go to Thessaloniki to be treated and remained there for 4 months while the majority of his men joined the band of Emmanuel Katsigaris.

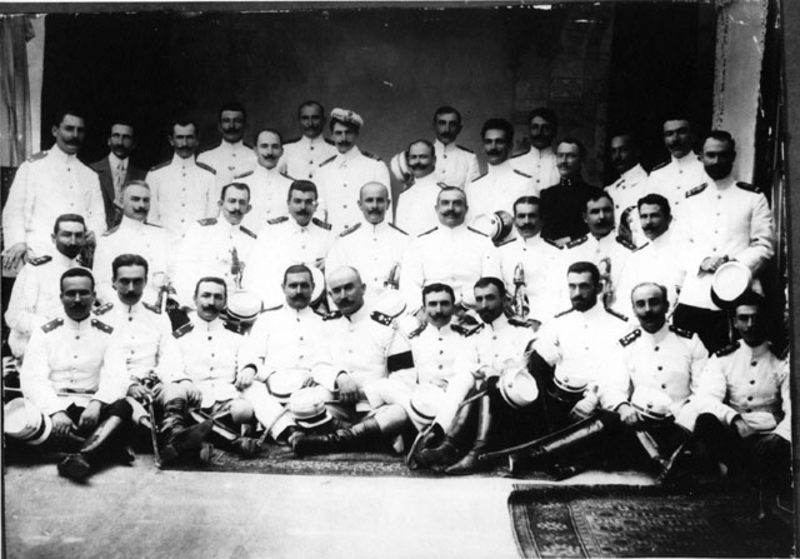
Spyros Spyriomilios and other officers who participated in the Greek Struggle for Macedonia (1909).

=== Goudi Coup ===
By 1909, Spyromilios had risen to the rank of Captain and had become a founding member of the "Military Association," which organized the Goudi military coup d'état. He took an active role in the coup which brought Eleftherios Venizelos to power and was later elected as a member of parliament for Arta.

=== Balkan Wars ===
At the outbreak of the First Balkan War in October 1912, he was positioned at the Ionian island of Corfu. There, he assembled a small corps of volunteers from his home region, augmented by 200 Cretan volunteers with whom he liberated Filiates and intercepted the Ottoman attempt to retake it. On 5 November, Himarë rose in revolt and his force landed and occupied this coastal region, without initially facing resistance. Spyromylios then suggested to the Greek Prime Minister Eleftherios Venizelos that the Greek Army should immediately capture the city of Avlona, north of Himarë. However, on November 28, the Albanians declared their independence in same city and formed a provisional government. Spyromilios was successful in attracting villages in the region to join his movement and clashes soon broke out against Albanian guerrillas. By December, he was able to maintain command of local volunteer detachments and repulsed various Albanian attacks to consolidate Greek rule. The Greek headquarters expected full-scale attack in the area following the failed Greek landing at Agioi Saranda and ordered him to retreat. He rejected the order and remained in the region organizing the local defense. Spyromilios held out until the regular Hellenic Army entered Himarë in the early days of 1913. He asked for the permission of Prime Minister Eleftherios Venizelos to move north and recapture Avlona, however, his request was denied to prevent strained relations with the Kingdom of Italy.

=== Northern Epirote movement ===
When the Second Balkan War ended, a series of peace treaties and protocols awarded the area to the newly formed Albanian state and the Greek forces were ordered to evacuate the area. At February 9, 1914 Spyromilios refused to withdraw and declared the region's autonomy and himself as Captain of Himarë. This resulted in General Papoulas, ordering his arrest for disobeying orders. Himarë would become part of the Autonomous Republic of Northern Epirus, proclaimed on February 28 in Argyrokastro, and recognized on May 17 by the Protocol of Corfu. Clashes with Albanian guerrillas would continue.

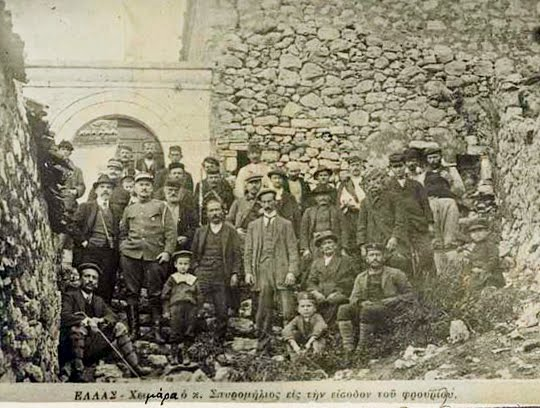
Spyros Spyromilios and other Greeks at the Kastro of Himarë (1912).

Spyromilios became member of the Greek Parliament for the Argyrokastron Prefecture at the following elections. At September 1916, when the Italian army entered the region he escaped to Athens. In the next years he was involved in the Northern Epirus issue.

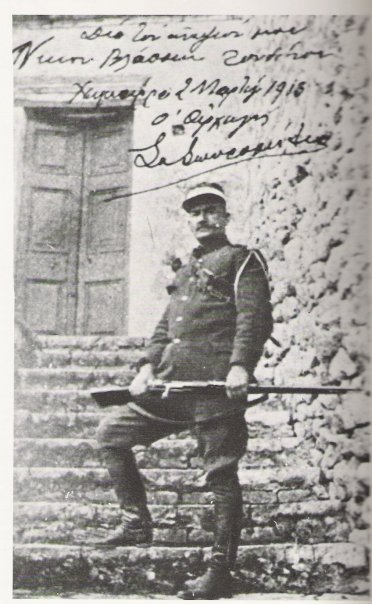
Spyros Spyromilios in front of his house in Himarë (1912–1916).

In 1926 he was given an honorary discharged with the rank of Colonel due to wounds he had received in battle.

== Legacy ==
Spyromilios kept correspondence with Albanian personalities, discussing the region's political future. A distinguished Albanian, Eqrem bej Vlora, noted that Spyromilios and his family were known for their bravery, persistence, and loyalty towards their friends.

Spyros Spyromilios died on May 19, 1930, in Athens, where he was buried in the First Cemetery with all honours. In attendance of his funeral was Eleftherios Venizelos, and other politicians and officers. His will expressed his desire to be buried in Himarë, but the Albanian Government rejected this request.

Spyromilios’ family mansion in Himarë, is one of the town's main attractions, although abandoned today.

== Sources ==
- Contested Spaces and Negotiated Identities in Dhermi/Drimades of Himare/Himara area, Southern Albania. Nataša Gregorič Bon. Nova Gorica 2008. Page 143–144.
- Ruches, Pyrrhus J. (1965). Albania's captives. Chicago: Argonaut.
