= Omer Fortuzi =

Albanian politician and mayor

Omer Fortuzi (April 25, 1895 in Tirana, Ottoman Empire – September 25, 1980 in Thessaloniki) was an Albanian politician and mayor of Tirana from 1940 through 1943. He died in August 1980 and buried in Xanthi. He served as Minister of National Economy of Albania.
