= Peço Kagjini =

Albanian politician

Peço Kagjini was an Albanian politician and mayor of Tirana from 1951 through 1952.
