= Rexhep Jella =

Albanian politician

Rexhep Jella was an Albanian politician and mayor of Tirana from 1930 to 1933.
