= Ibrahim Sina =

Albanian politician and mayor

Ibrahim Sina was an Albanian politician and mayor of Tirana from 1947 through 1949 and 1954 through 1955.
