= Isuf Keçi =

Albanian politician

Isuf Keçi was an Albanian politician and mayor of Tirana from 1950 to 1951. He was arrested after being found to participate in activities against the Communist Party of Albania.
