= Libohovë Castle =

- Kalaja e Libohovës
- Libohovë, in southern Albania
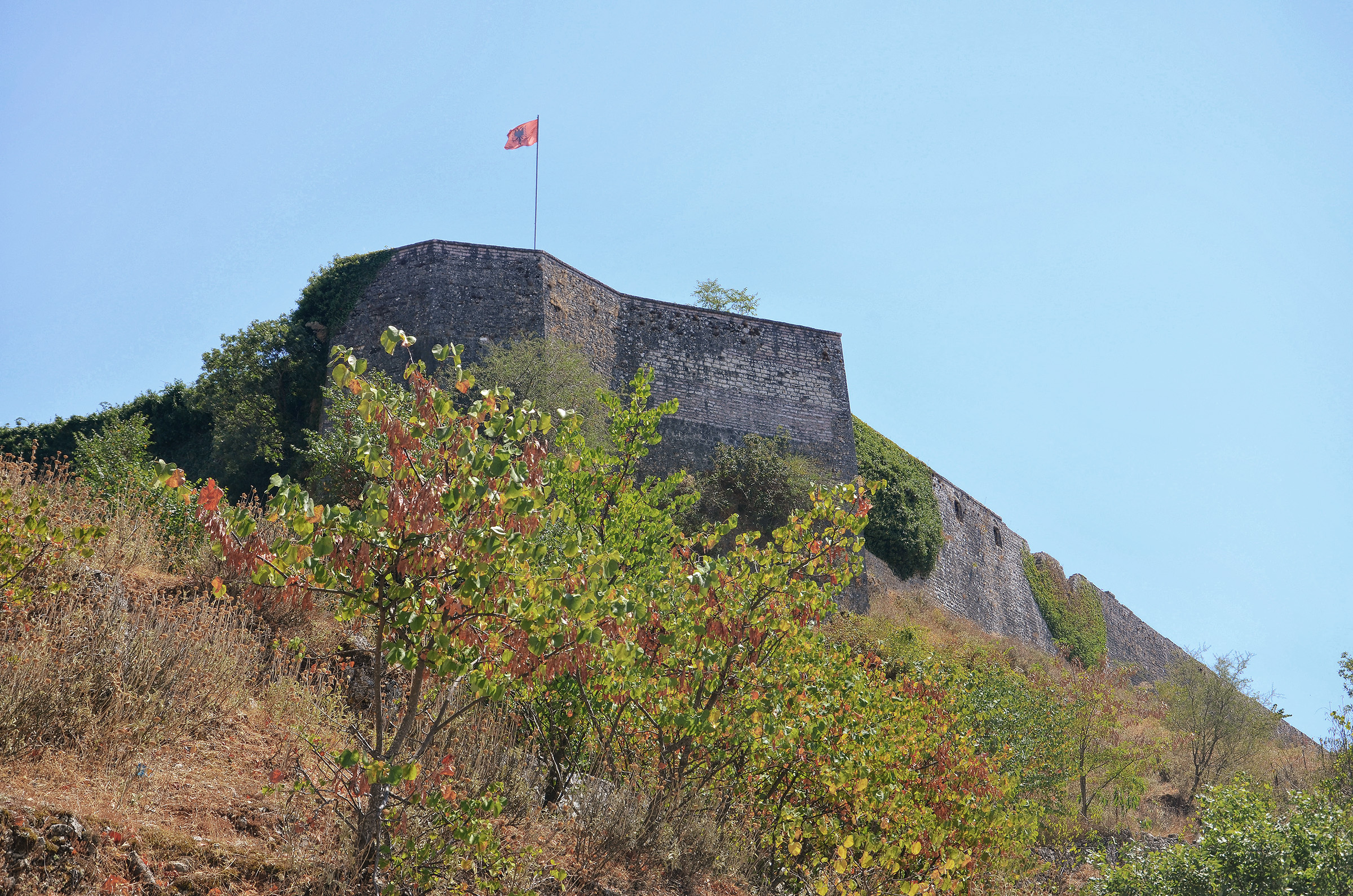
- Libohovë Castle

Site information
- Owner: Albania
- Controlled by: Ottoman Empire; Albania
- Open to the public: Yes
- Condition: ruin

Location
- Location within Albania
- Coordinates: 40.031°N 20.265°E

Site history
- Built: 1796-1798
- Built by: Ali Pasha of Ioannina

Libohovë Castle (Albanian: Kalaja e Libohovës) is an Ottoman-era castle in Libohovë, Gjirokastër county, southern Albania.

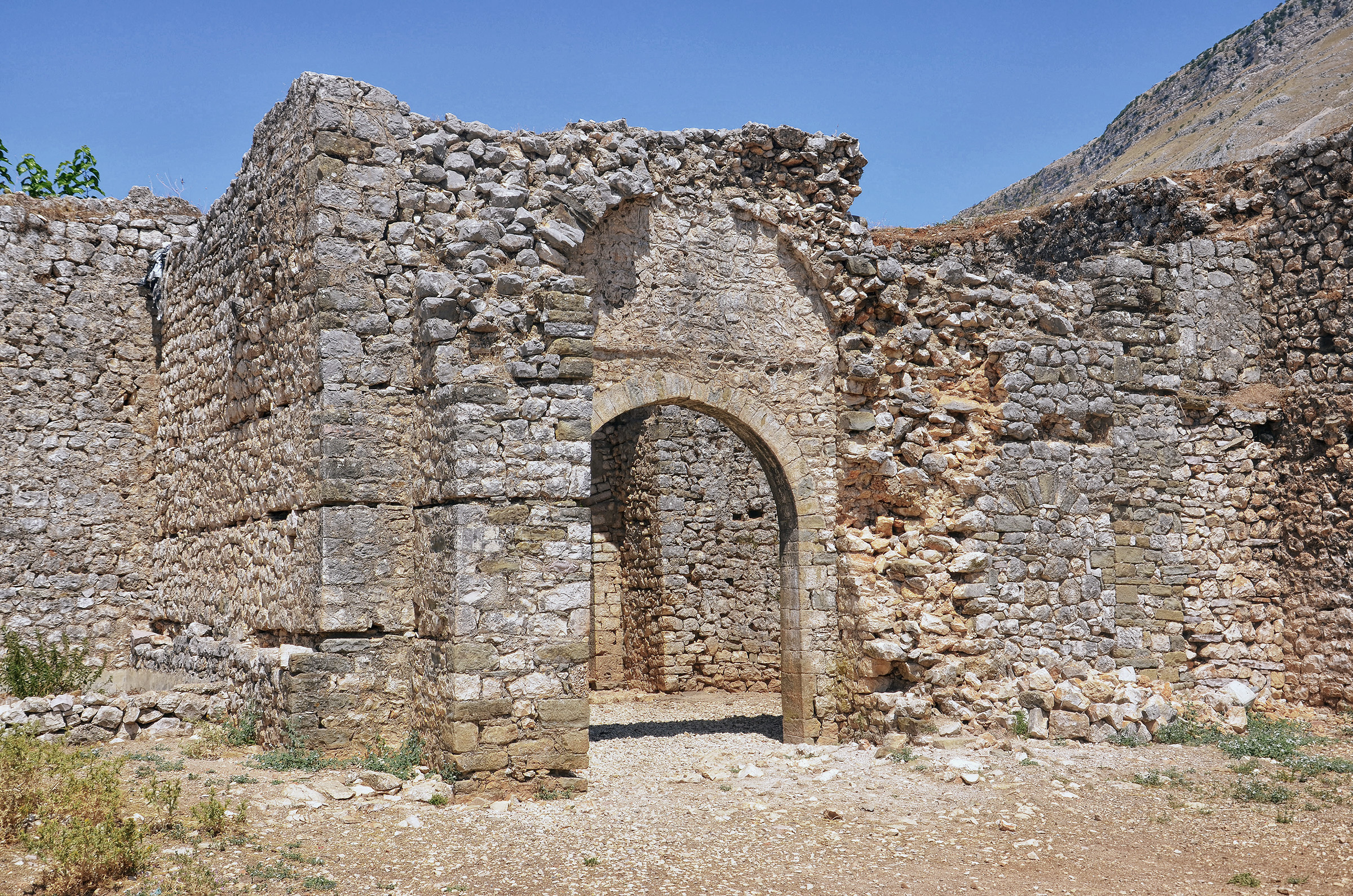
Inside of the castle.

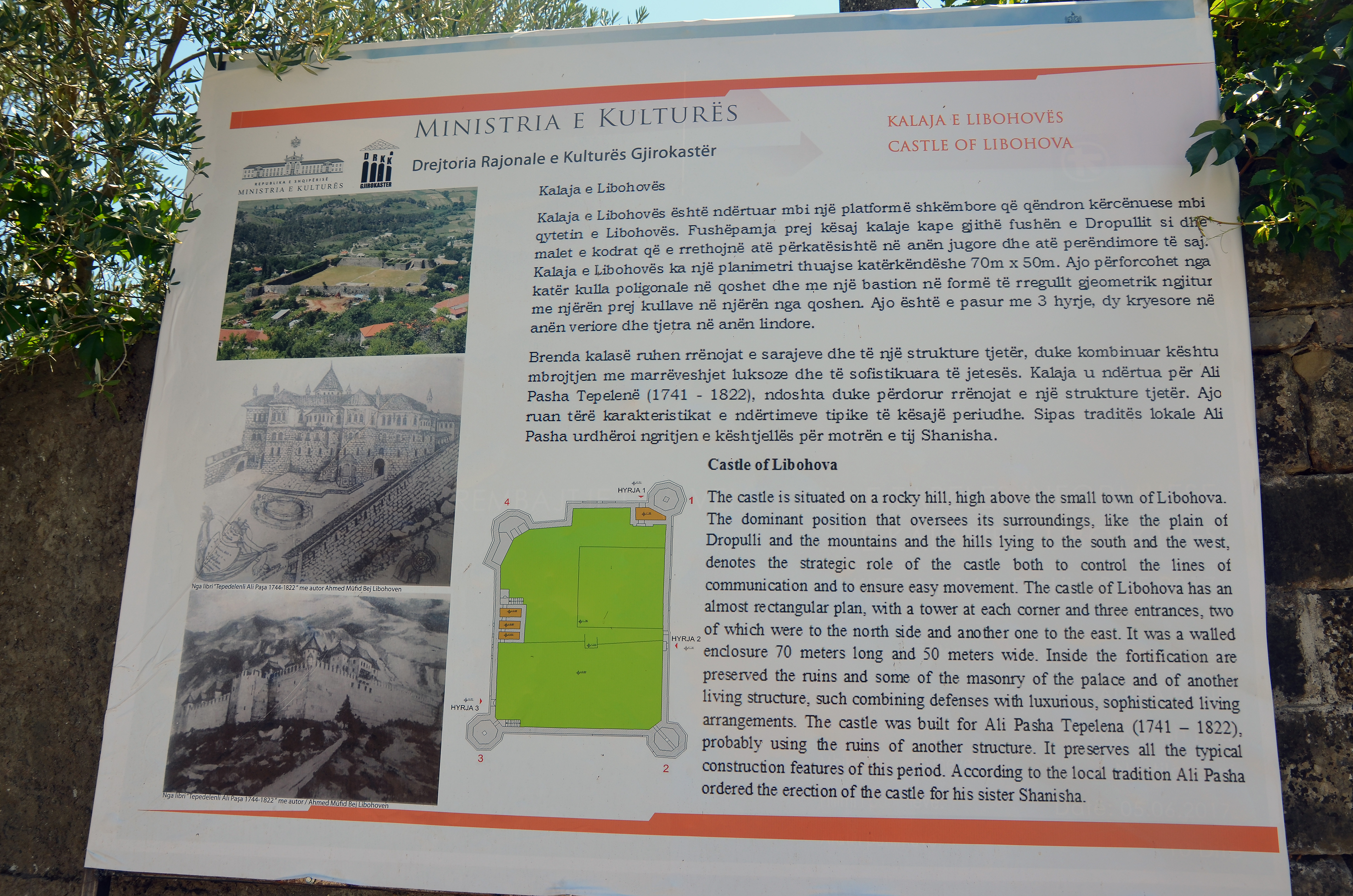
Old drawings of how the residence used to look like when Shanisha sister of Ali Pasha Tepelena used to live there.

It is possible that Libohovë Castle was built on the ruins of another castle or other structure. It was built between 1796 and 1798 by Ali Pasha of Ioannina. The castle was built for his sister Shanish as a Wedding Gift. She lived in the castle until she eventually died and her grave is near the city of Libohova. Today the Castles inner area/Feudal residence is empty but the walls are still standing tall.

== See also ==
- Libohove
- List of castles in Albania
- Tourism in Albania
