= Sali Kelmendi =

Albanian politician (1947–2015)

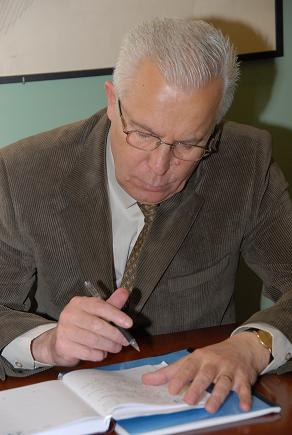

38th Mayor of Tirana
- In office 1992 – 27 October 1996
- Preceded by: Tomor Malasi
- Succeeded by: Albert Brojka

Personal details
- Born: May 31, 1947 Tirana, Albania
- Died: 7 February 2015 (aged 67)
- Cause of death: Heart attack
- Party: Democratic Party of Albania
- Other political affiliations: New Democratic Party (1999-2008)

Sali Kelmendi (31 May 1947 – 7 February 2015) was an engineer and a politician. One of the founders of the Democratic Party of Albania in 1990.

== Political career ==
In the early 1990s, he worked at the Ministry of Education, where he covered vocational education. In the period of great movements, in the years '90-'91. After being elected as the head of the independent trade union for the Ministry of Education, he participated in the founding of the Democratic Party of Albania. Kelmendi was the first democratically elected mayor of Tirana in the democratic elections of July 1992. During the years 1992-1996, over 90% of enterprises and 100% of homes were denationalized. Also a lot of work was done in the housing of the politically persecuted people. Thus, he contributed in the Tirana's transformation from a centrally planned economy to a market oriented system. Mainly during the term his temporary permits were given for small tin kiosks to develop small business in the city as well as to reduce unemployment., the housing of the homeless as well as the politically persecuted, the restoration of a number of public works were carried out. During the period when Kelmendi ran the Municipality of Tirana, the Democratic Party won 5 consecutive elections in the city, namely the elections of March 22, 1992, the local elections of July 1992, the referendum on the Constitution in 1994, the elections of May 26, 1996, the local elections in October 1996. In this way, he is the only one who has brought victory to this party in this city. During 1997-1999, Kelmendi actively continued participated in the Democratic Party after being replaced by Brojka. In 1999, together with a group of other members of the Democratic Party, help create the group of the New Democratic Party. In where he acted as the director of the administration of the party and as a member of the national leadership. However, in 2008 with members of the New Democratic Party they returned to the Democratic Party where they merged both Parties.

Sali Kelmendi died after a heart attack on 7 February 2015.
