= Xhemal Kondi =

Albanian politician

Xhemal Kondi was an Albanian politician and mayor of Tirana from 1924 to 1925.
