= Megali Idea =

Greek Irredentist concept until 1922

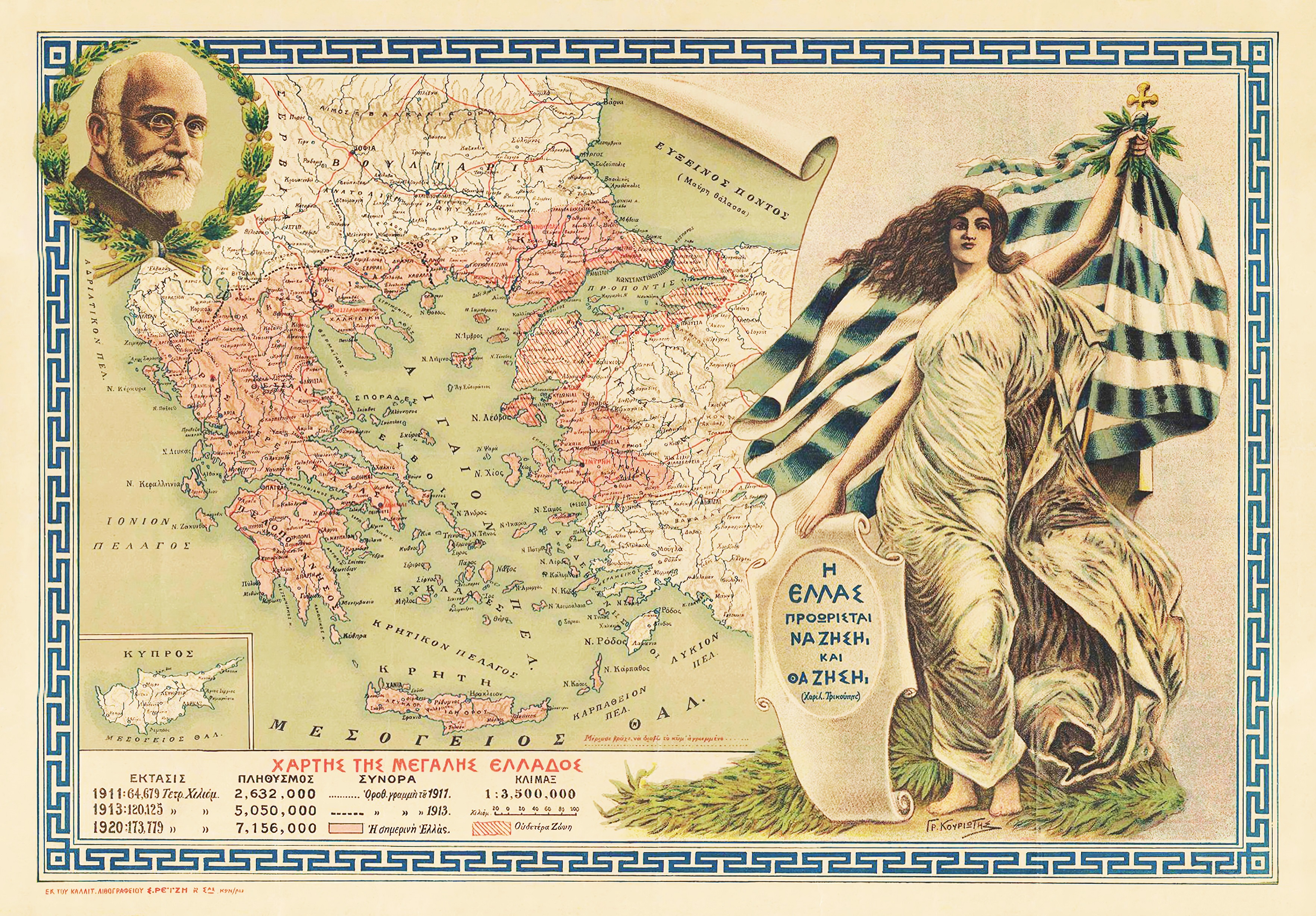
Map of Megali Hellas after the Treaty of Sèvres and featuring a picture of Eleftherios Venizelos.

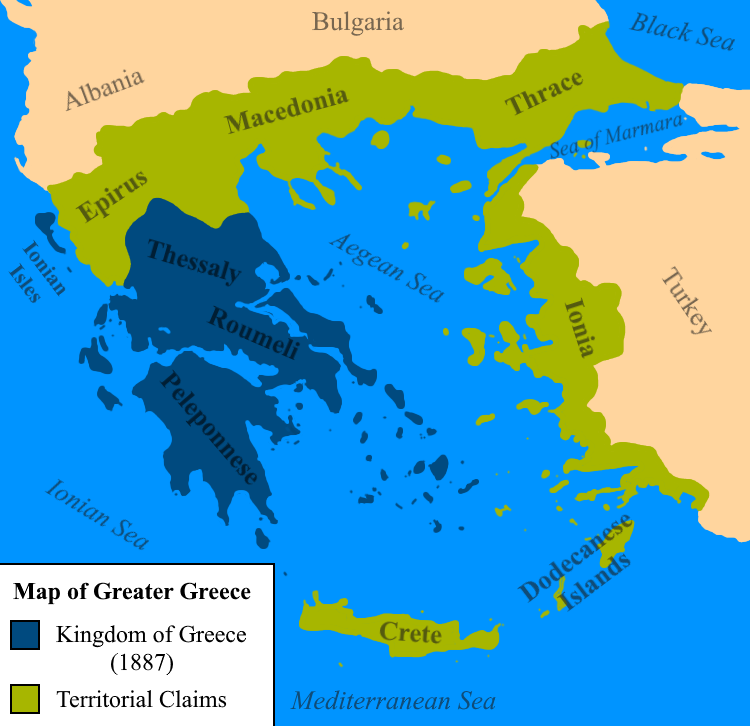
Map of Megali Hellas (Greater Greece) as proposed at the Paris Peace Conference of 1919 by Eleftherios Venizelos, the leading major proponent of the Megali Idea at the time.

The territorial expansion of Greece, 1832–1947.

The Megali Idea (Greek: Μεγάλη Ιδέα, romanized: Megáli Idéa, lit. 'Great Idea') was a Greek nationalist and irredentist concept that expressed the goal of reviving the Byzantine Empire, by establishing a Greek state, which would include the large Greek populations that were still under Ottoman rule after the end of the Greek War of Independence (1821–1829) and all the regions that had large Greek populations (parts of the southern Balkans, Anatolia and Cyprus).

The term appeared for the first time during the debates of Prime Minister Ioannis Kolettis with King Otto that preceded the promulgation of the 1844 constitution. It came to dominate foreign relations and played a significant role in domestic politics of the kingdom of Greece for much of the first century of its independence, up until the population exchange between Greece and Turkey in 1923. The expression was new in 1844 but the concept had roots in the Greek popular psyche, which long had hopes of liberation from Ottoman rule and restoration of the Byzantine Empire. The last Byzantine Emperor Constantine XI Palaiologos became known in later Greek folklore as "The Marble Emperor" (Greek: Μαρμαρωμένος Βασιλιάς, Marmaroménos Vasiliás lit. 'Emperor turned into Marble'), reflecting a popular legend that Constantine had not actually died, but had been rescued by an angel and turned into marble, hidden beneath the Golden Gate of Constantinople awaiting a call from God to be restored to life and reconquer both the city and the old empire.

Πάλι με χρόνια με καιρούς,

πάλι δικά μας θα 'ναι!

(Once more, as years and time go by, once more they shall be ours).

The Megali Idea implies establishing a Greek state, which would be a territory encompassing mostly the former Byzantine lands from the Ionian Sea in the west to Anatolia and the Black Sea to the east and from Thrace, Macedonia and Epirus in the north to Crete and Cyprus to the south. This new state would have Constantinople as its capital: it would be the "Greece of Two Continents and Five Seas" (Europe and Asia, the Ionian, Aegean, Marmara, Black and Libyan Seas). If realized, this would expand modern Greece to roughly the same size and extent as the later Byzantine Empire, after its restoration in 1261 AD.

The Megali Idea dominated foreign policy and domestic politics of Greece from the War of Independence in the 1820s through the Balkan Wars in the beginning of the 20th century. It started to fade after the Greco-Turkish War (1919–1922), followed by the population exchange between Greece and Turkey in 1923. Despite the end of the Megali Idea project in 1922, by then the Greek state had expanded four times, either through military conquest or diplomacy (often with British support). After the creation of Greece in 1830, it acquired the Ionian Islands (Treaty of London, 1864), Thessaly (Convention of Constantinople (1881)), Macedonia, Crete, (southern) Epirus and the Eastern Aegean Islands (Treaty of Bucharest), and Western Thrace (Treaty of Neuilly, 1920). The Dodecanese were acquired after the Second World War (Treaty of Peace with Italy, 1947).

A related concept is Enosis.

== Background ==
=== Fall of Constantinople ===
The Byzantine Empire was called the "Roman Empire" by its inhabitants, though often not by the Latin West, which regarded it as Greek. After its fall, Hieronymus Wolf popularized the usage of "Byzantium". An informal cultural division had existed within the Roman Empire for centuries. Although Latin was the official language of the empire, Greek was the lingua franca in the East and was regularly used alongside Latin in official business. The division of the Empire following the death of Emperor Theodosius in AD 395 added a formal political layer to the informal cultural division. Following the adoption of Christianity in the 4th century, Greek was also the dominant liturgical language, as exemplified by the fact that the New Testament was written in Greek. These factors ultimately led to Greek replacing Latin as the official language in AD 620.

Byzantium held out against numerous invasions over the centuries and during the 10th and early 11th centuries managed to reclaim considerable territory in the Balkans, Anatolia and to a lesser extent Syria. The Turkish invasion of the mid to late 11th century, however, greatly weakened the Empire and, although it partially recovered under the Komnenos dynasty, it never managed to regain control of the Anatolian interior, cutting the empire off from a valuable source of manpower and tax revenue. In 1204, Constantinople was besieged and sacked during the Fourth Crusade and became the Capital of what has come to be known as the Latin Empire, a French-dominated crusader state, until it was liberated by the Empire of Nicaea, the Byzantine state in exile, in 1261. However, Byzantine strength would rapidly diminish towards the end of the 13th century and evaporate almost entirely during the 14th century, to the extent that by 1400 little remained of the Empire except Constantinople, the city’s immediate surroundings and some small territories in modern-day Greece. In 1453, the Ottoman Turks besieged and captured Constantinople, officially marking the end of the Roman Empire and also the end of Greek predominance in the city; although it would continue to have a considerable Greek speaking population and the Patriarch of Constantinople continued to reside in the city.

=== Greeks under Ottoman rule ===
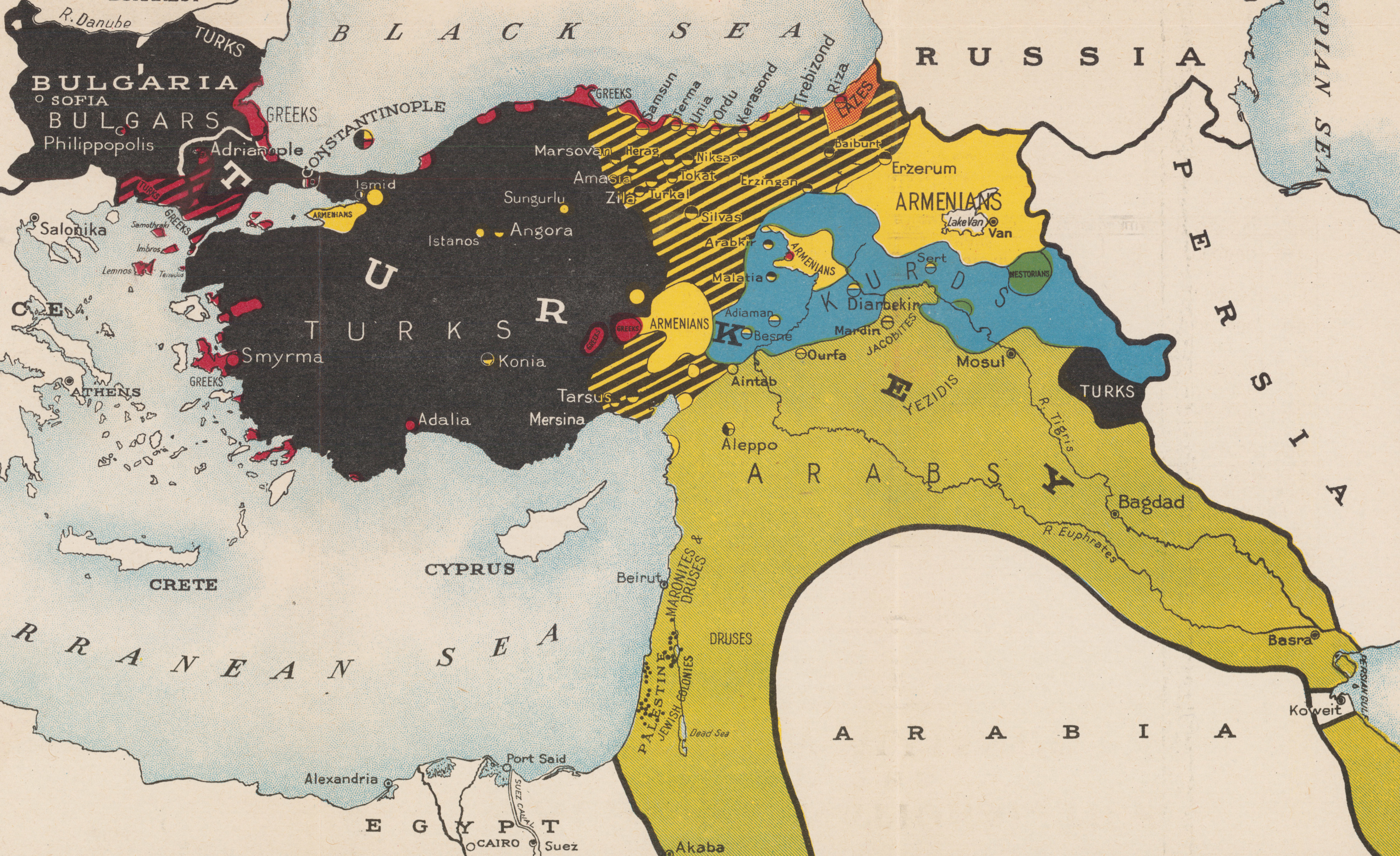
Ethnic map of Asia Minor in 1917.: Bulgarians and Turks; Greeks; Armenians; Kurds; Lazes; Arabs; Assyrians (Labeled as "Nestorians")

Under the millet system which was in force during the Ottoman Empire, the population was classified according to religion rather than language or ethnicity. Orthodox Greeks were seen as part of the millet-i Rûm (literally "Roman community") which included all Orthodox Christians, including beside Greeks also Bulgarians, Serbs, Vlachs, Slavs, Georgians, Romanians and Albanians, despite their differences in ethnicity and language and despite the fact that the religious hierarchy was Greek dominated. It is not clear to what extent one can speak of a Greek identity during those times as opposed to a Christian or Orthodox identity. In the late 1780s, Catherine II of Russia and Joseph II of Austria intended to reclaim the Byzantine heritage and restore the Greek statehood as part of their joint Greek Plan.

During the Middle Ages and the Ottoman period, Greek-speaking Christians identified as Romans and thought of themselves as the descendants of the Roman Empire. The term Roman was often interpreted as synonymous with Christian throughout Europe and the Mediterranean during this time. The terms Greek or Hellene were largely seen by Ottoman Christians as referring to the ancient pagan peoples of the region. This changed during the late stages of the Ottoman Empire and the emergence of the Greek independence movement.

For much of the period of the Tourkokratia, the Russians were viewed by the Greeks as the xanthon genos, a fair-haired race and the sole Orthodox power that would liberate Constantinople from the Ottomans. The Greek legend of the xanthon genos eventually liberating Constantinople was also referenced in the 15th-century Tale on the Taking of Tsargrad, which itself was widely circulated in Russia between the 16th and 18th centuries.

== Greek War of Independence and modern Greece ==
"The Kingdom of Greece is not Greece; it is merely a part: the smallest, poorest part of Greece. The Greek is not only he who inhabits the Kingdom, but also he who inhabits Ioannina, Salonika or Serres or Adrianople or Constantinople or Trebizond or Crete or Samos or any other region belonging to the Greek history or the Greek race... There are two great centres of Hellenism. Athens is the capital of the Kingdom. Constantinople is the great capital, the dream and hope of all Greeks."

— Kolettis voicing his convictions in the National Assembly in January 1844.

After the Greek War of Independence ended in 1829, a new southern Greek state was established, with assistance from the British Empire, Kingdom of France, and Imperial Russia. However, this new Greek state under John Capodistrias after the Greek War of Independence was, with Serbia, one of the only two countries of the era whose population was smaller than the population of the same ethnicity outside its borders; most ethnic Greeks still resided within the borders of the Ottoman Empire. This version of Greece was designed by the Great Powers, who had no desire to see a larger Greek state replace the Ottoman Empire.

The Great Idea embodied a desire to bring all ethnic Greeks into the Greek state, and subsequently revive the Byzantine Empire; it applied specifically to the Greeks in Epirus, Thessaly, Macedonia, Thrace, the Aegean Islands, Crete, Cyprus, parts of Anatolia, and the city of Constantinople (which would replace Athens as the capital).

When the young Danish prince Wilhelm Georg was elected king in 1863, the title offered to him by the Greek National Assembly was not "King of Greece", the title of his deposed predecessor, King Otto; but rather "King of the Hellenes". Implicit in the wording was that George I was to be king of all Greeks, regardless of whether they then lived within the borders of his new kingdom.

The first additional areas to be incorporated into the Kingdom were the Ionian islands in 1864, and later Thessaly with the 1878 Treaty of Berlin.

=== Revolts, Cretan crisis and Greco-Turkish War (1897) ===
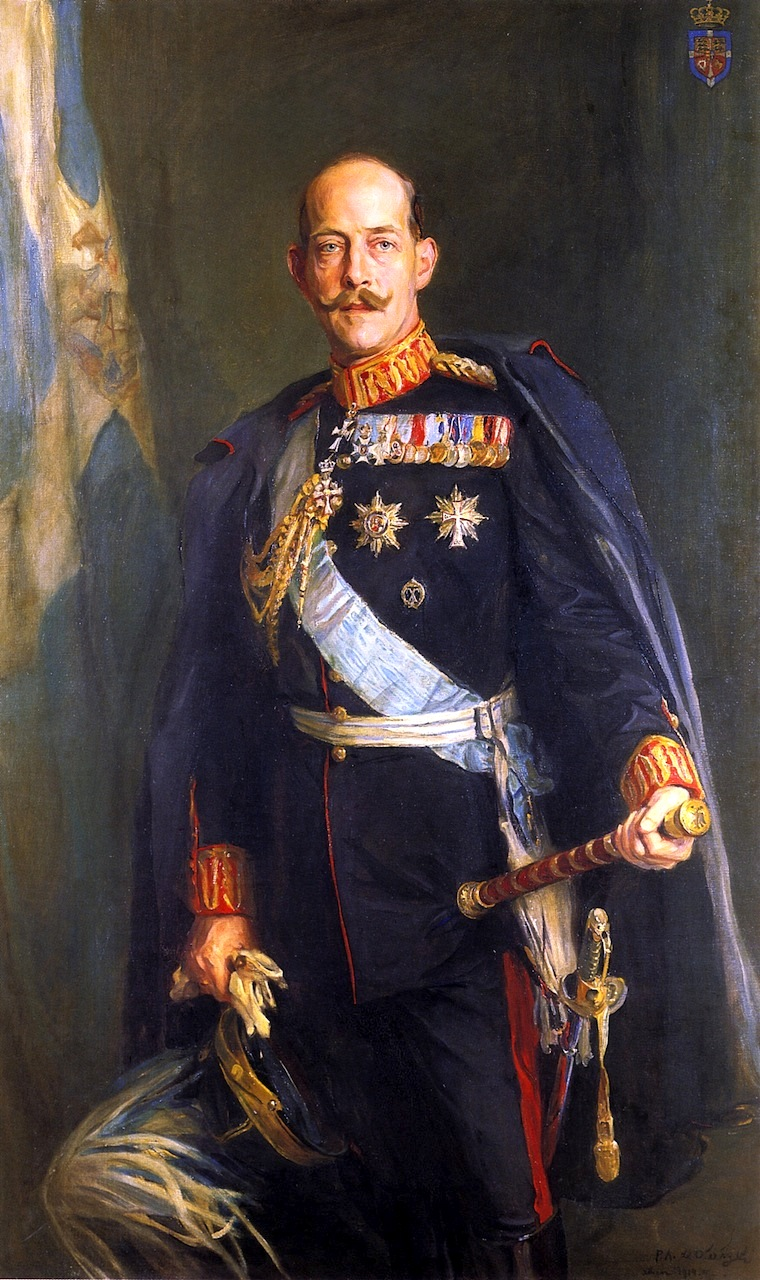
Constantine I of Greece was called Constantine XII by his supporters, the purported successor to the Emperor Constantine XI Palaiologos

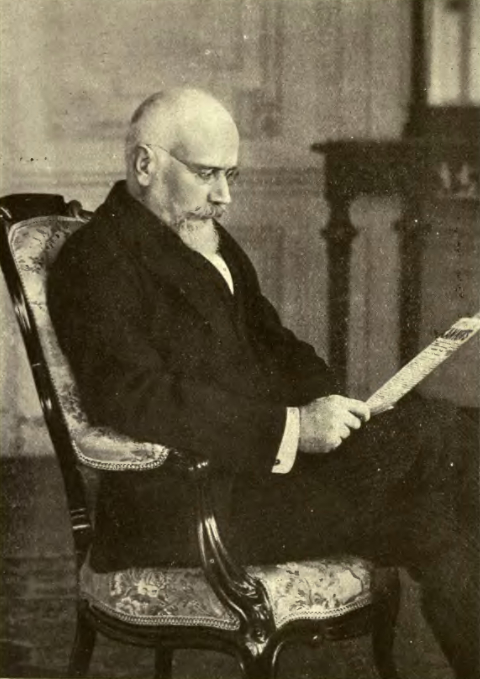
Eleftherios Venizelos tried to realize the Megali Idea

In January 1897, violence and disorder were escalating in Crete, polarizing the population. Massacres of the Christian population took place in Chania and Rethymno. The Greek government, pressured by public opinion, intransigent political elements, extreme nationalist groups (e.g. Ethniki Etairia) and with the Great Powers reluctant to intervene, decided to send warships and personnel to assist the Cretans. The Great Powers had no option then but to proceed with the occupation of the island, but they were too late. A Greek force of 1,500 men had landed at Kolymbari on 1 February 1897, and its commanding officer, Colonel Timoleon Vassos, declared that he was taking over the island "in the name of the King of the Hellenes" and that he was announcing the union of Crete with Greece. This led to an uprising that spread immediately throughout the island. The Great Powers finally decided to land their troops and stopped the Greek army force from approaching Chania. At the same time, their fleets blockaded Crete, preventing both Greeks and Turks from bringing any more troops to the island.

The Ottoman Empire, in reaction to the rebellion of Crete and the assistance sent by Greece, relocated a significant part of its army in the Balkans to the north of Thessaly, close to the borders with Greece. Greece, in reply, reinforced its borders in Thessaly. However, irregular Greek forces and followers of the Megali Idea acted without orders and raided Turkish outposts, leading the Ottoman Empire to declare war on Greece; the war is known as the Greco-Turkish War of 1897. The Turkish army, far outnumbering the Greek, was also better prepared, due to the recent reforms carried out by a German mission under Baron von der Goltz. The Greek army fell back in retreat. The other Great Powers then intervened and an armistice was signed in May 1897. The war, however, only ended in December of that year.

The military failure in the Greco-Turkish war cost Greece small territorial losses along the border line in northern Thessaly, and a large sum of financial reparations that wrecked Greece's economy for years, while giving no lasting solution to the Cretan Question. The Great Powers (Britain, France, Russia, and Italy) in order to prevent future clashes and trying to avoid the creation of a revanchist climate in Greece, imposed what they thought of as a lasting solution; Crete was proclaimed an autonomous Cretan State. The four Great Powers assumed the administration of Crete, and, in a decisive diplomatic victory for Greece, Prince George of Greece (second son of King George I) became High Commissioner.

== Early 20th century ==
=== Balkan Wars ===
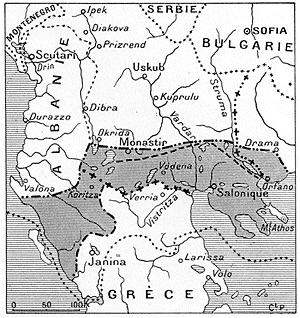
Greek claims in Epirus and Macedonia after the First Balkan War

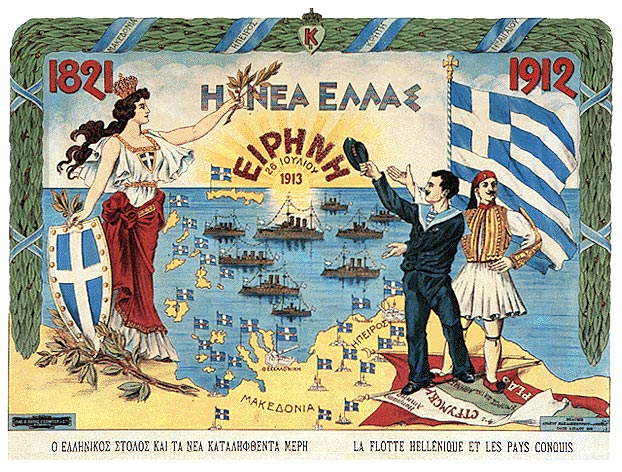
Poster celebrating the "New Hellas" after the Balkan Wars.

A major proponent of the Megali Idea was Eleftherios Venizelos, under whose leadership Greek territory doubled in the Balkan Wars of 1912–13 — southern Epirus, Crete, Lesbos, Chios, Ikaria, Samos, Samothrace, Lemnos and the majority of Macedonia were attached to Greece. Born and raised in Crete, in 1909 Venizelos was already a prominent Cretan and had influence in mainland Greece. As such, he was invited after the Goudi coup in 1909 by the Military League to become Prime Minister of Greece. Venizelos pressed forward a series of reforms in society, as well as the military and administration, which helped Greece succeed in its goals during the Balkan Wars.

=== World War I ===
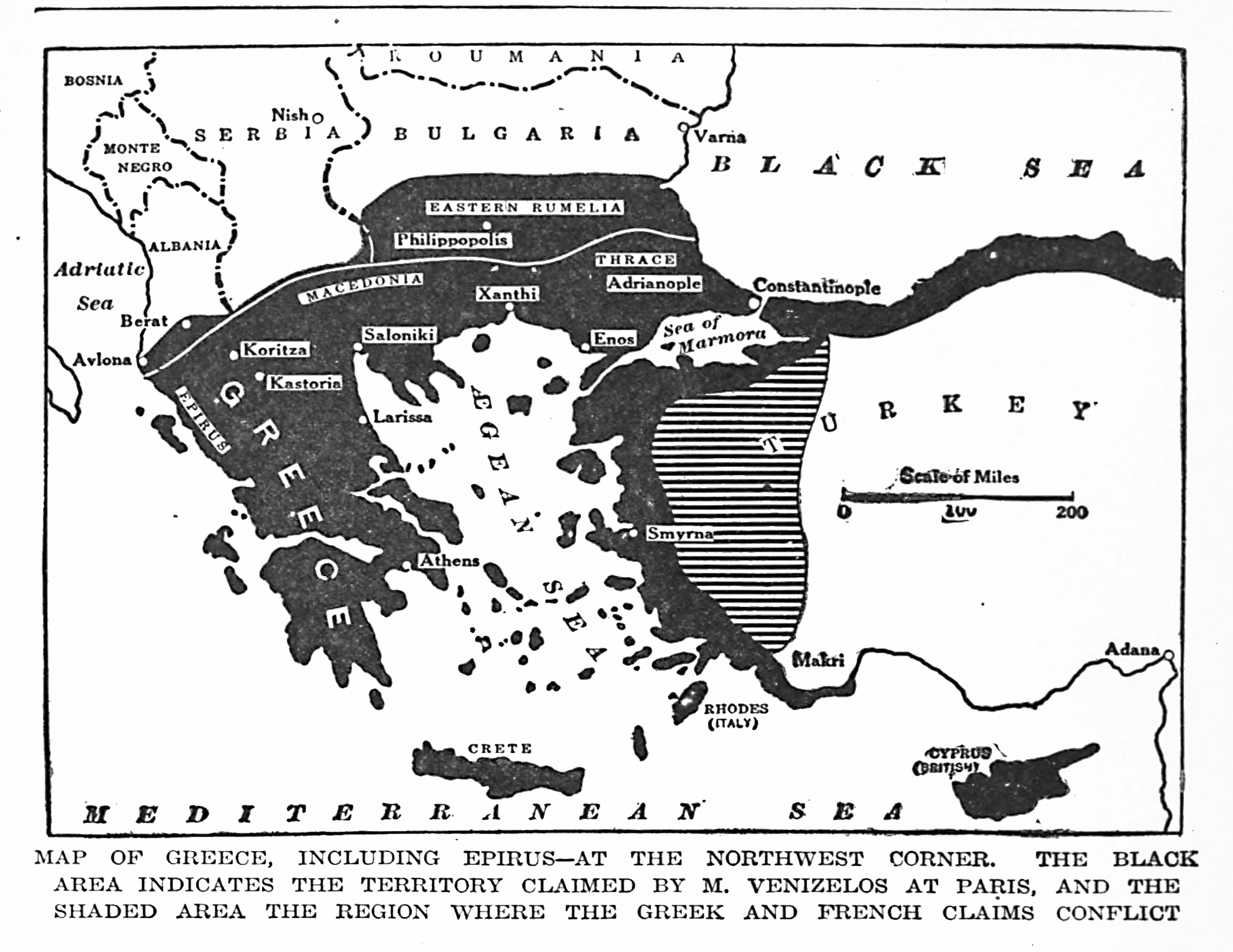
Map showing Greek ambitions at the Paris Peace Conference after World War I, 1919

Following the Greek gains in the Balkan Wars, the Ottomans began to persecute ethnic Greeks living in the Empire, which led to ethnic cleansing in the Greek genocide. This persecution continued into World War I when the Ottomans declared for the Central Powers in late 1914. Greece remained neutral until 1917 when it joined the Allies. Refugees' reports of Turkish atrocities as well as the Allied victory in World War I seemed to promise an even greater realization of the Megali Idea. Greece gained a foothold in Asia Minor with a protectorate over Smyrna and its hinterland. Following 5 years of Greek administration, a referendum was to be held to determine whether the territory would revert to Ottoman control or join Greece. Greece also gained the islands of Imbros and Tenedos, Western and Eastern Thrace, the border then drawn a few miles from the walls of Constantinople.

== Asia Minor Catastrophe ==
=== Greco-Turkish War (1919–1922) ===
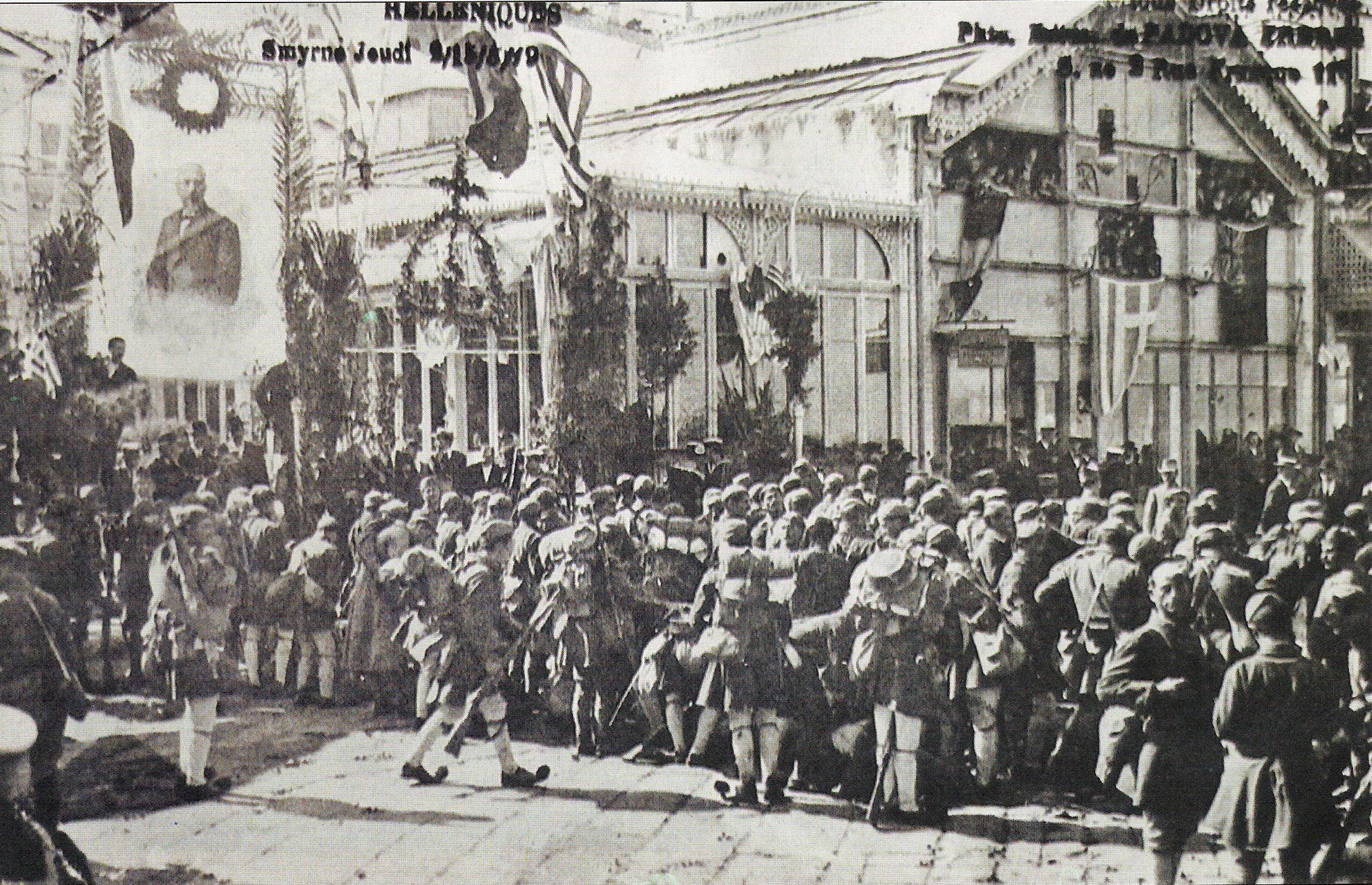
Greek soldiers in Smyrna, May 1919.

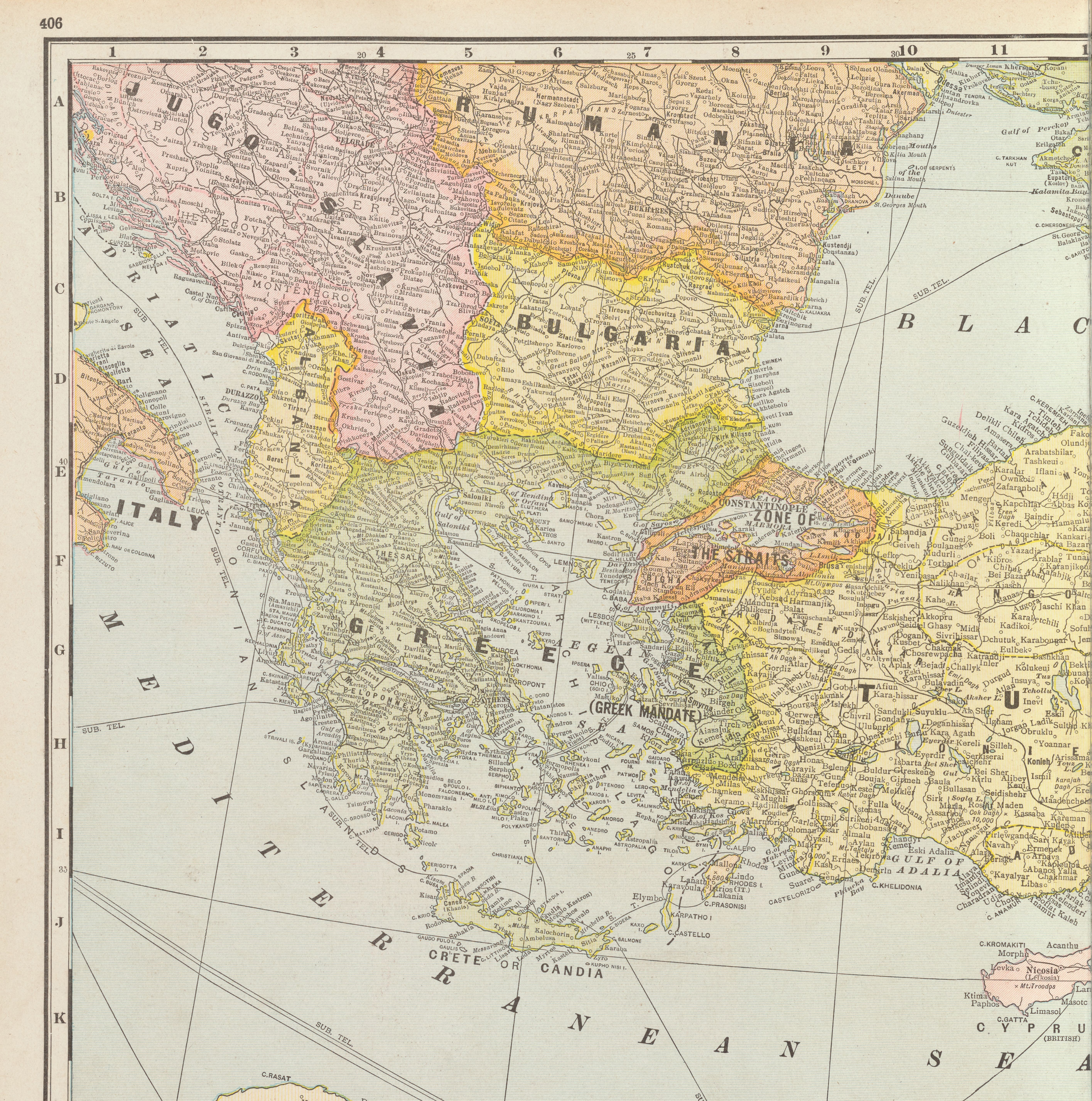
Map of Greater Greece in 1922 with the Greek Mandate and Zone of the Straits

Greece's efforts to take control of Smyrna in accordance with the Treaty of Sèvres were thwarted by Turkish revolutionaries, who were resisting the Allies. The Turks finally prevailed and expelled the Greeks from Anatolia during the Greco-Turkish War (1919–1922) (part of the Turkish War of Independence). The war was concluded by the Treaty of Lausanne, which saw Greece cede Eastern Thrace, Imbros, Tenedos and Smyrna to the nascent Turkish Republic. To avoid any further territorial claims, both Greece and Turkey engaged in an "exchange of populations": During the conflict, 151,892 Greeks had already fled Asia Minor. The Treaty of Lausanne moved 1,104,216 Greeks from Turkey, while 380,000 Turks left the Greek territory for Turkey. The transfers ended any further appetite for pursuing the concept of a Greater Greece and ended the 3000-year Greek habitation of Asia Minor. Further population exchanges occurred after World War I, including 40,027 Greeks from Bulgaria, 58,522 from Russia (because of the defeat of the White Army led by Pyotr Wrangel) and 10,080 from other lands (for example Dodecanese or Albania), while 70,000 Bulgarians from Thrace and Macedonia had moved to Bulgaria. From the Bulgarian refugees, c. 66,000 were from Greek Macedonia.

The immediate reception of refugees to Greece cost 45 million francs, so the League of Nations arranged for a loan of 150 million francs to aid the settlement of refugees. In 1930, Venizelos even went on an official visit to Turkey, where he proposed that Mustafa Kemal be awarded the Nobel Peace Prize.

The Greek novelist Yiorgos Theotokas described the psychological impact of the defeat of 1922:

"For a short time, while the Treaty [of Sèvres] ran its joyful but uncertain course, it seemed to them that the...long-buried hopes of their ancestors were to be fulfilled. But the terrible summer of 1922 came all too soon. From the hermitage of Arsenios they watched, tense with anxiety, the daily unfolding of the national tragedy, the last desperate efforts of the Royalist Governments of Greece to save the situation, the failure of King Constantine's attempt to take Constantinople, and the final Catastrophe.
In mid-August Mustapha Kemal broke through the Greek front and the Greek army, exhausted by ten years of warfare and the privations of the Asia Minor campaign, was vanquished in two weeks. The Turks, advancing rapidly, recaptured in quick succession Afion-Karahisar, Eski-Shehir, Kiutahia, Brussa, Oushak—and then Smyrna! Once again the banners of Islam floated proudly, tauntingly, over the Aegean coast opposite Chios and Mytilene. The whole of Ionia was in flames. Slaughter and pillage descended on the smiling city of Smyrna and in a few short days turned it into a ruin...As day succeeded day, Greece seemed to have become paralyzed, to have lost all will, all ability to resist the blows of fate. The swiftness of the catastrophe completely overwhelmed the State, flooded as it was by the thousands of fleeting soldiers and refugees who sought shelter on the Greek coasts. The nation was plunged into deep despair...
Greece had lost her big gamble and had been uprooted from Asia Minor. St. Sophia remained in the hands of the Moslems. The brilliant plans of 1918 were mocking visions, hallucinations, dreams. And the return of reality was truly heartbreaking. The tale of the years was not yet told, then, the historic hour, the fulfillment of the Great Idea, the moment they had longed for with such faith and such anxiety for five tortured, bloody centuries, had not yet come! It was all a lie!"

== See also ==
- Enosis
- Greek diaspora
- Autonomous Republic of Northern Epirus
- Occupation of Istanbul
- Republic of Pontus
- Foreign relations of Greece
- Succession of the Roman Empire

== Sources ==
- Clogg, Richard (20 June 2002). A Concise History of Greece. Cambridge University Press. ISBN 978-0-521-00479-4.
