= Anastas Kondo =

Albanian writer, screenwriter, and micropaleontologist

Anastas Kondo (November 28, 1937 – 2006) was an Albanian writer, screenwriter, and micropaleontologist.

== Life ==
Anastas Kondo was born on 28 November 1937 in Kuçovë, Albania, and hailed from a family from Vuno, in Himarë municipality, on the Albanian riviera. He studied in the Saint Petersburg State Institute of Technology and graduated there as a geologist. Kondo became one of the main textbook authors and undertook several scientific studies on micropaleontology in Albania.

Kondo has been the screenwriter of movies such as Misioni përtej detit, Dimri i madh, Kur zbardhi një ditë, Partizani i vogël Velo, etc. He has won national prizes on several books published such as the short stories volumes Ura (The bridge), Kur mbaron e vdes burri (When the man finishes and dies), Portat e diellit (The gates to the sun), Pse e vranë Odisenë (Why was Odissey killed), Njerëz dhe gurë (Men and stones), Kur zbardhi një ditë (A day's dawn).

He has been a Deputy Minister of Education as well as secretary of the Albanian League of Writers and Artists. Died in 2006.
