= Sofokli Lazri =

Albanian diplomat (1923–2002)

Sofokli Lazri (1923–2002) was an Albanian diplomat and publicist. In the 1980s he was the principal advisor of Albania's premier, Ramiz Alia, with regard to Albania's international relations. Lazri was the founder, in 1981, of the Institute of Studies of International Relations (Albanian: Instituti i Marredhenieve Nderkombetare). He is also known as a publicist (mainly non-fiction). His name has attracted controversy in Albania as some media have deemed him to be a secret agent of the Soviet Union's KGB.

== Life ==
Born in Vuno, in the Himara region, in 1923, Sofokli Lazri studied at Shkodër and Tirana high schools, and was involved in the National Liberation Movement, in the 5th Attacking Brigade, in which he participated in the liberation of Albania and Kosovo from Nazi Germany. He graduated in journalism at the Lomonosov Moscow State University. Upon his return from his studies he worked as a journalist, eventually becoming the chief editor of the Bashkimi newspaper, as well as secretary of the council of editors of Zëri i Popullit. He was also a professor of the University of Tirana, where, in 1971, he obtained the Professor title. At the university he founded the chair of journalism, and focused on teaching international studies. In 1981 he founded the first Institute of Studies of International Relations in Albania. He was head of the Albanian Commission of Unesco, and from 1982 to 1991 political advisor of President Ramiz Alia. Lazri headed special missions such as the reestablishment of relations with the Soviet Union, the United States, the United Kingdom, and Germany. He was a member of the Central Committee of the Party of Labour of Albania.

Among Lazri's several publications is Rikthimi i dhimbjes (English: The return of the pain), a non-fiction book about World War II fighter Ramize Gjebrea and her tragic death, which was published post-mortem and reviewed by critic Dhimitër Shuteriqi.

== Controversy ==
According to a book by Mehmet Elezi, entitled “Enigma e vëllezërve siamezë”, 2011, Lazri was one of the most powerful people in communist Albania. It is claimed he made key decisions in the international politics of Albania and that he ranked higher than Ramiz Alia in the eyes of the Soviet Union. Other publications describe Lazri as merely the chief of secret services of the KGB in Albania.
