= Athanasios Pipis =

Greek revolutionary commander

Athanasios Pipis (Greek: Αθανάσιος Πίπης, died in 1821) was a Greek priest and the Greek Orthodox revolutionary commander in the Greek War of Independence (1821–1830).

== Life ==
Pipis was born in the village of Vuno, Himara, Ottoman Empire modern Albania, then Ottoman Empire.

In July 1804 he joined the Himariote and Souliote regiment of the Imperial Russian Army, in order to support a possible revolt against the Ottomans. Later, in 1821, when the Greek War of Independence was imminent, he joined the forces of Alexander Ypsilantis and participated in the revolt against the Ottoman Empire in Moldavia and Wallachia. In one incident, on 7 June 1821, in the wake of the Battle of Dragashani, Pipis together with thirty men tried to defend against numerical superior Ottoman forces. Pipis was killed together with the rest of his men.
