= Ali Derhemi =

Albanian politician

Ali Derhemi (1850-?) was an Albanian politician and mayor of Tirana from 1923 through 1924.
