= Nesip Ibrahimi =

Albanian politician

Nesip Ibrahimi was an Albanian politician and mayor of Tirana from 1976 to 1983.
