= Himara revolt of 1912 =

1912 uprising during the First Balkan War

Himara Revolt
- Part of the First Balkan War
- Military developments in Himara (November 18–30, 1912)
Date	November 18 [O.S. November 5] 1912
Location	Himara, Janina Vilayet, Ottoman Empire (present-day Albania)
Result	Greek victory
Territorial changes	Coastal region of Himara secured by Greece

Belligerents
Himariote insurgents	Ottoman Empire (before November 28, 1912); Independent Albania (after November 28, 1912)

Commanders and leaders
Spyros Spyromilios	(Ottoman Empire) Mehmet Esat Bülkat (Independent Albania) Ekrem bey Vlora

Strength
Unknown	Unknown

Casualties and losses
1 (WIA)	Unknown killed (Independent Albania) 13 (POW) (Ottoman Empire) 2 killed (Ottoman Empire) 20 (POW)

The Himara Revolt (Greek: Εξέγερση της Χειμάρρας), was a Greek uprising during the First Balkan War that took place in the region of Himara (Himarë, today southern Albania), on November 18 [O.S. November 5] 1912. It successfully overthrew the Ottoman forces of the region, thus securing the coastal area between Sarandë and Vlorë for the Hellenic Army.

== Background ==
During the First Balkan War (1912-1913), the Epirus front was of secondary importance for Greece after the Macedonian front.

This unit was later reinforced by additional 200 Greek volunteers from Crete (Cretan commanders Galeros, Papagiannakis and Polixigis) sent by General Konstantinos Sapountzakis, commander of the Greek army in Epirus front.

== Conflicts ==
=== End of Ottoman rule ===
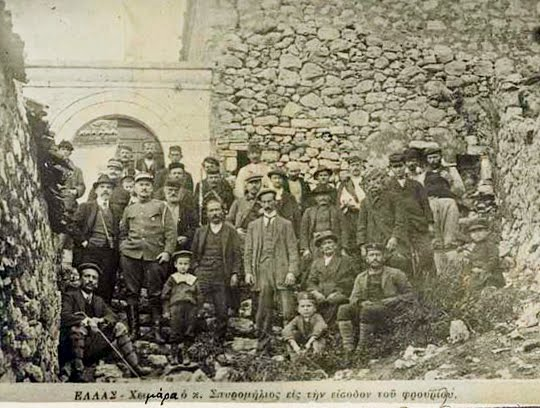
Spyromilios and local Himariotes in front of the castle of Himara.

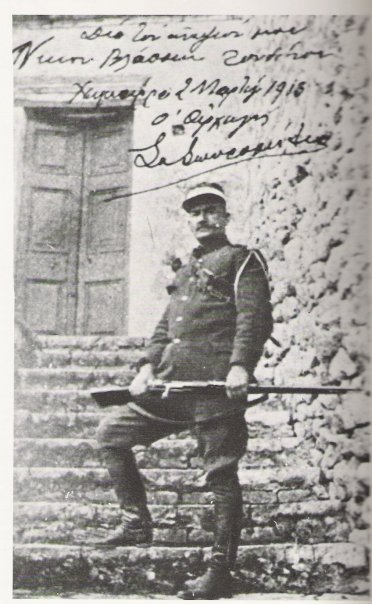
Spyros Spyromilios in Himara.

=== Securing the region ===
Spyromilios also suggested to the Greek Prime Minister Eleftherios Venizelos that the coastal city of Vlorë should come under Greek control but the latter responded negatively from fear that this might trigger Italian military intervention.

Albanian attacks against Himara were initiated after the Albanian Declaration of Independence in Vlorë on November 28. The representative of the Albanian provisional government, Eqrem Vlora, sent a letter to Orthodox Greeks in Himarë ordering them to "affirm their allegiance to Albania or face destruction" and giving them three days to decide whether they desired to "live with the Albanians or die with the Greeks". Nevertheless, the defenders managed to repel them and the area remained under Greek control until the end of the Balkan Wars. In one occasion when the Greek headquarters expected full-scale attack in the area it ordered Spyromilios to retreat, however he rejected the order and remained in the region, successfully organizing the local defence.

== Aftermath ==
Under the terms of the Protocol of Florence, signed on December 17, 1913, the region of Northern Epirus, in which Himarë was part was awarded to Albania. This decision triggered a series of events that lead to the proclamation of the Autonomous Republic of Northern Epirus in Gjirokastër by the local Greek population.

== Sources ==
- Kondis, Basil (1976). Greece and Albania: 1908-1914 (Thesis). Thessaloniki: Institute for Balkan Studies, New York University. doi:10.12681/eadd/4724. hdl:10442/hedi/4724.
- Sakellariou, M. V. (1997). Epirus, 4000 Years of Greek history and Civilization. Athens: Ekdotike Athenon. ISBN 9789602133712.
