= Edlira Dedja =

Edlira Dedja Bytyçi is an Albanian pianist, art critic, municipal councilor, and creator and leader of the cultural foundation Opera sans frontieres (Opera without borders) in the capital of the Swiss canton of Neuchâtel on Lake Neuchâtel.

== Life and career ==
She is a descendant of the academic and writer Bedri Dedja. Her work has included promoting opera artists including Saimir Pirgu and Ermonela Jaho, and has organised international charity concerts for the benefit of children with mental health problems. She has also worked with the Swiss organisation ASED - Action for the Support of Deprived Children, to create specialized centers of free services of support in Berat and other cities of Albania.

== See also ==
- List of Albanians
- Music of Albania
