= Servet Libohova =

Albanian politician and mayor

- Servet Libohova photo
- Born: Libohovë, Ottoman Empire (modern Albania)
- Occupation: politician

Servet Libohova was an Albanian politician and mayor of Tirana from 1915 through 1916.
