= Tomor Malasi =

Albanian politician and mayor

Tomor Malasi was an Albanian politician and mayor of Tirana from 1991 through 1992. He was Deputy Speaker of the Parliament of Albania from 1992 to 1996. He died on 8 July 2023, 87 years old.
