= Zyber Hallulli =

Albanian mufti and politician

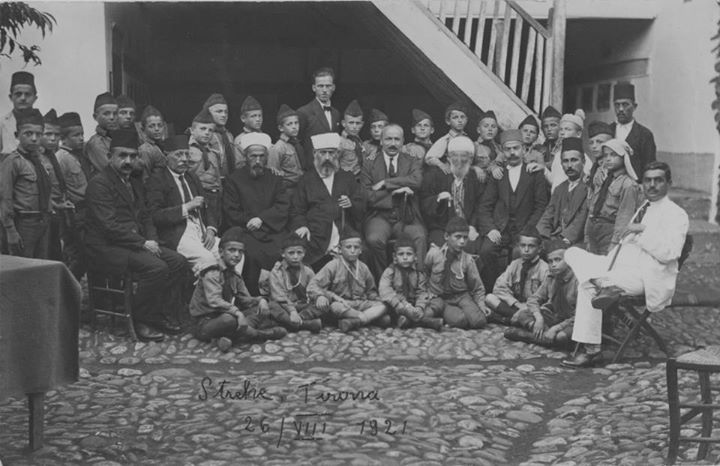
- "Streha Vorfnore", August 1921. Zyber Hallulli, 6th from left, seated in middle row.
- Born: 1842; Tirana, Ottoman Empire
- Died: 1927 (aged 84–85); Tirana, Albania
- Citizenship: Ottoman, Albanian
- Known for: "Streha Vorfnore" public orphanage Mayor of Tirana (1913-1914)

Hoxhë Zyber Hallulli was an Albanian mufti and politician. He served as mayor of Tirana from 1913 through 1914. He was the co-founder of the first public orphanage in Albania.

== Life ==
Hallulli was born in Tirana, Albania, then part of the Ottoman Empire, in 1842. He took the first studies in his home town, finishing the "Ruzhdie" high school. After that he went to Istanbul where he graduated in philosophy and theology.

Together with Rauf Fico, Mytesim Këlliçi, Luigj Shala and Xhelal Toptani he co-founded Streha Vorfnore, the Albania's first public orphanage, on November 28, 1917, the fifth anniversary of the Albanian Declaration of Independence. The initiators involved a commission of benefactors from the rich families and merchants of the town. The orphanage is still the main one in Albania and is named after him: Shtëpia e Fëmijëve "Zyber Hallulli" (English: Children House "Zyber Hallulli").

Hallulli supported the Albanian Declaration of Independence, the government and outcome of the Congress of Lushnje, and the June Revolution.

He died in 1927.
