= Zaho Koka =

Albanian partisan

- Born: 14 July 1920; Vuno, Principality of Albania
- Died: June 1944 (aged 23)
- Military career
- Allegiance: National Liberation Movement (Albania)
- Branch: Fifth Assault Brigade
- Service years: 1942-1944
- Rank: Deputy Commissar
- Unit: Third Battalion
- Conflicts: Battle of Vishë
- Awards: Hero of the People of Albania

Zaho Koka (14 July 1920, Vuno - 1944), was an Albanian World War II partisan and Hero of the People of Albania.

== Early life ==
Koka was born in Vuno, Albania. His family was known for growing citrus, building mills, cheesemaking, and weapon manufacturing. His mother Katerina came to Vuno from Grabocka in Korçë. Zaho grew up in Vuno along with his two brothers and three sisters.

== World War II partisan activity ==
On August 25, 1942, Zaho led the action in Vishë where he ambushed lieutenant Luigi Moretti and carabinieri Fulvio Capelletti. In 1941 he became part of the partisan detachments and in 1942 he entered the "Fifth Assault Brigade", assuming the role of deputy commissar of the Third Battalion of this Brigade. During this time, he met the partisan Ramize Gjebrea, who was accused at the time of having an affair with him. The General Staff decided to court-martial Ramize Gjebrea by executing her, while a lighter measure was taken for Zaho, removing him from all functions in the Brigade. In June 1944 he committed passive suicide by facing the front of the German convoy and their bullets.

Unlike Ramize, Zaho was proclaimed "Hero of the People" and throughout the years of communism in Albania he was honored as a good fighter who fell in the war. Several books have been written about Zaho and Ramize's love in recent years.
