= Rifat Dedja =

Albanian politician

Rifat Dedja was an Albanian politician and mayor of Tirana from 1958 through 1961 and 1962 through 1964.
