= Albert Brojka =

Albanian mayor

39th Mayor of Tirana
- In office 27 October 1996 – 11 October 2000
- Preceded by: Sali Kelmendi
- Succeeded by: Edi Rama

49th Minister for Industry, Trade and Transport
- In office 4 December 1994 – 16 August 1995
- Preceded by: Fatos Bitincka
- Succeeded by: Suzana Panariti

Personal details
- Born: 19 October 1958 (age 67) Tirana, PR Albania
- Party: Democratic Party of Albania

Albert Brojka (born 19 October 1958) was an Albanian politician and mayor of Tirana from 1996 through 2000. He was the Minister for Industry, Trade and Transport in the 1992 government of Aleksandër Meksi. He is a member of the Democratic Party.

== Early life ==
Brojka was born in Tirana. He graduated in geology from the University of Tirana.
