= Ethniki Etaireia =

19th-century Greek nationalist society

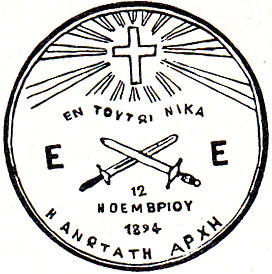
Seal of the Ethniki Etaireia

The Ethniki Etaireia (Greek: Εθνική Εταιρεία, lit. 'National Society') was a secret Greek nationalistic organization created in November 1894, by a number of young nationalist officers, advocates of the Megali Idea. Its aim was to revive the morale of the country and prepare the liberation of Greek people still under the Ottoman Empire.

In September 1895 they recruited civilians, all linked to the organization of the Olympic Games, including Demetrius Vikelas, although he claimed only to have given in to friendly pressure, playing a solely financial role and then quickly resigning from it.

The populism of the Ethniki Etaireia is considered to be responsible for the outbreak of the Greco-Turkish War of 1897. Following Greece's defeat, it was dissolved under the pressure of Prime Minister Georgios Theotokis.

== See also ==
- Secret society
