= Mayor of Tirana =

Head of the municipal government of Tirana, Albania

- Kryetari i Bashkisë së Tiranës
- Flag of Tirana

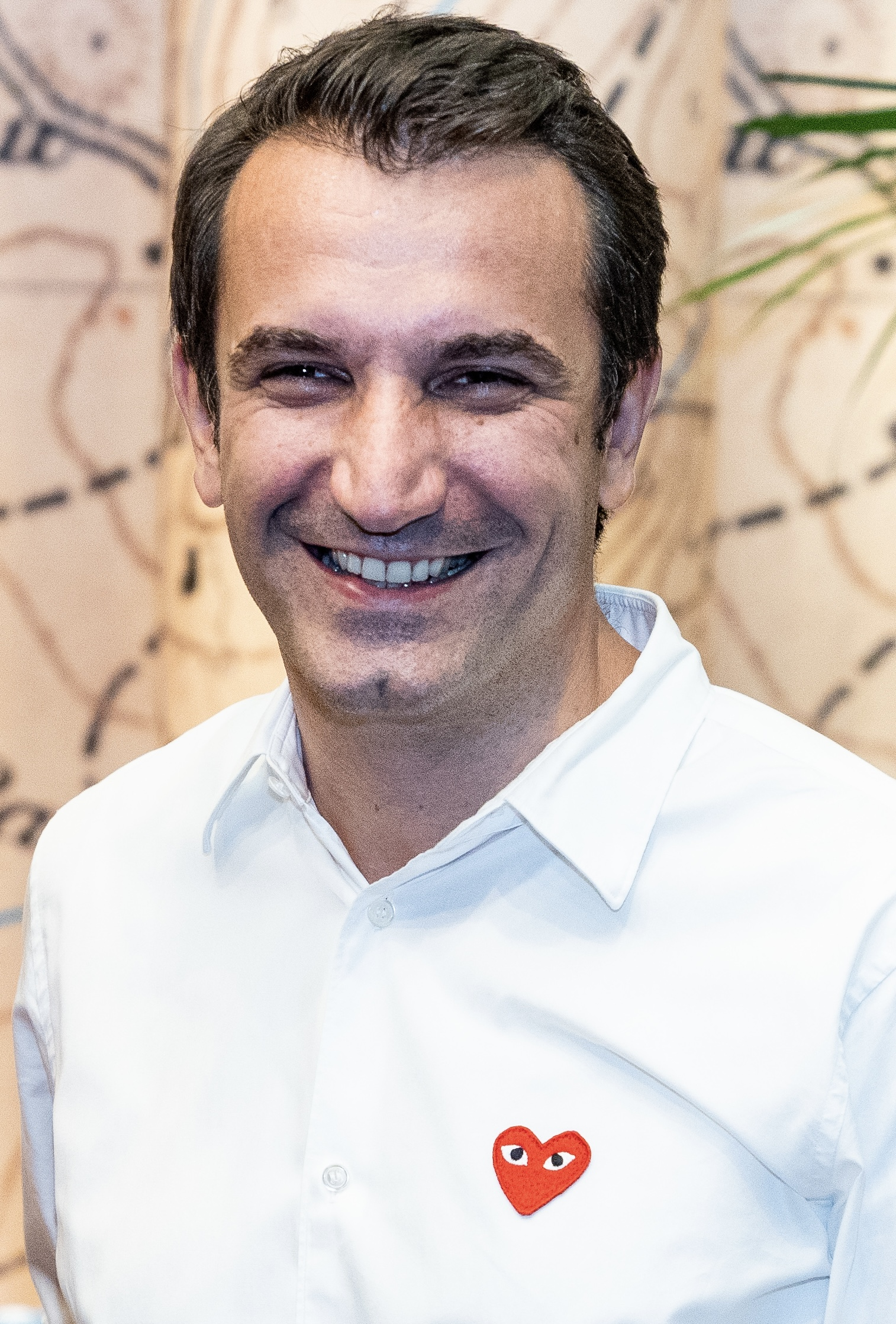
- Incumbent; Erion Veliaj
- Member of: Tirana Municipal Council
- Seat: Tirana City Hall; Skanderbeg Square 2, 1001 Tirana, Albania
- Term length: Four years, renewable 3 times consecutively
- Inaugural holder: Zyber Hallulli
- Formation: 1913
- Deputy: Anuela Ristani; Ilir Mëngra; Blendi Sulaj; Vasilika Vjero; Gentian Këri
- Website: tirana.al

The mayor of Tirana (Albanian: Kryetari i Bashkisë së Tiranës) is the head of the municipality of Tirana, Albania. The mayor exercises the executive power of the city and is directly elected, together with the municipal council, for a 4-year term.

The mayor's responsibilities include executing the acts passed by the city council, reporting to the council on the state of the city, serving as a member of the county council, appointing the deputy mayors and the administrators of the city's administrative units, and representing the municipality with third parties. The mayor is also able to veto the decisions of the city council once, which can be overturned with a simple majority.

Tirana's city hall, located in Skanderbeg Square, serves as the seat of both the city council and the mayor.

The current officeholder is Erion Veliaj of the Socialist Party who was elected for his first four-year term on 21 July 2015. He was re-elected for his third four-year-term on 16 May 2023, however his term was suspended as he was arrested on 10 February 2025 by SPAK on 9 charges including corruption and money laundering, and as of 23 September 2025, he was officially discharged by the Municipal Council of Tirana but decision has been suspended pending a confirmation from constitutional court.

== History ==
=== 1913–1990 ===
After the General Assembly of Tirana in 1913, Zyber Hallulli elected as the first mayor of Tirana. He served from 1913 to 1914 as the mayor. Ali Bakiu became the 19th mayor of Tirana. He served after the World War II, from 1945 to 1947. In 1986, Llambi Gegprifti became the mayor of the city, selected twice. First from 1986 to 1987 and 1989 to 1990 (after the fall of communism in Albania).

=== 1990–present ===
| No. | Portrait | Name | Took office | Left office | Time in office | Party |
|---|---|---|---|---|---|---|
| 1 | Sali Kelmendi | Sali Kelmendi (1947–2015) | 26 July 1992 | 27 October 1996 | 4 years, 93 days | PD |
| 2 | Albert Brojka | Albert Brojka (born 1958) | 27 October 1996 | 11 October 2000 | 4 years, 15 days | PD |
| 3 | Edi Rama | Edi Rama (born 1964) | 11 October 2000 | 25 July 2011 | 10 years, 287 days | PS |
| 4 | Lulzim Basha | Lulzim Basha (born 1974) | 25 July 2011 | 21 July 2015 | 3 years, 361 days | PD |
| 5 | Erion Veliaj | Erion Veliaj (born 1979) | 21 July 2015 | Incumbent | 11 years, 48 days | PS |
| — | Anuela Ristani | Anuela Ristani (born 1982); Acting (Note: Anuela Ristani served as acting mayor while Veliaj's mayoral powers and duties were suspended by the government from 10 February 2025 to 3 November 2025 due to his arrest, but the Constitutional Court later reinstated him as mayor.) | 11 February 2025 | 3 November 2025 | 265 days | PS |

== See also ==
- Politics of Albania
