= Labëria =

Historical region in southwestern Albania

Coordinates: 40°10′N 19°50′E

Laberia Labëria (Albanian)
- Historical region
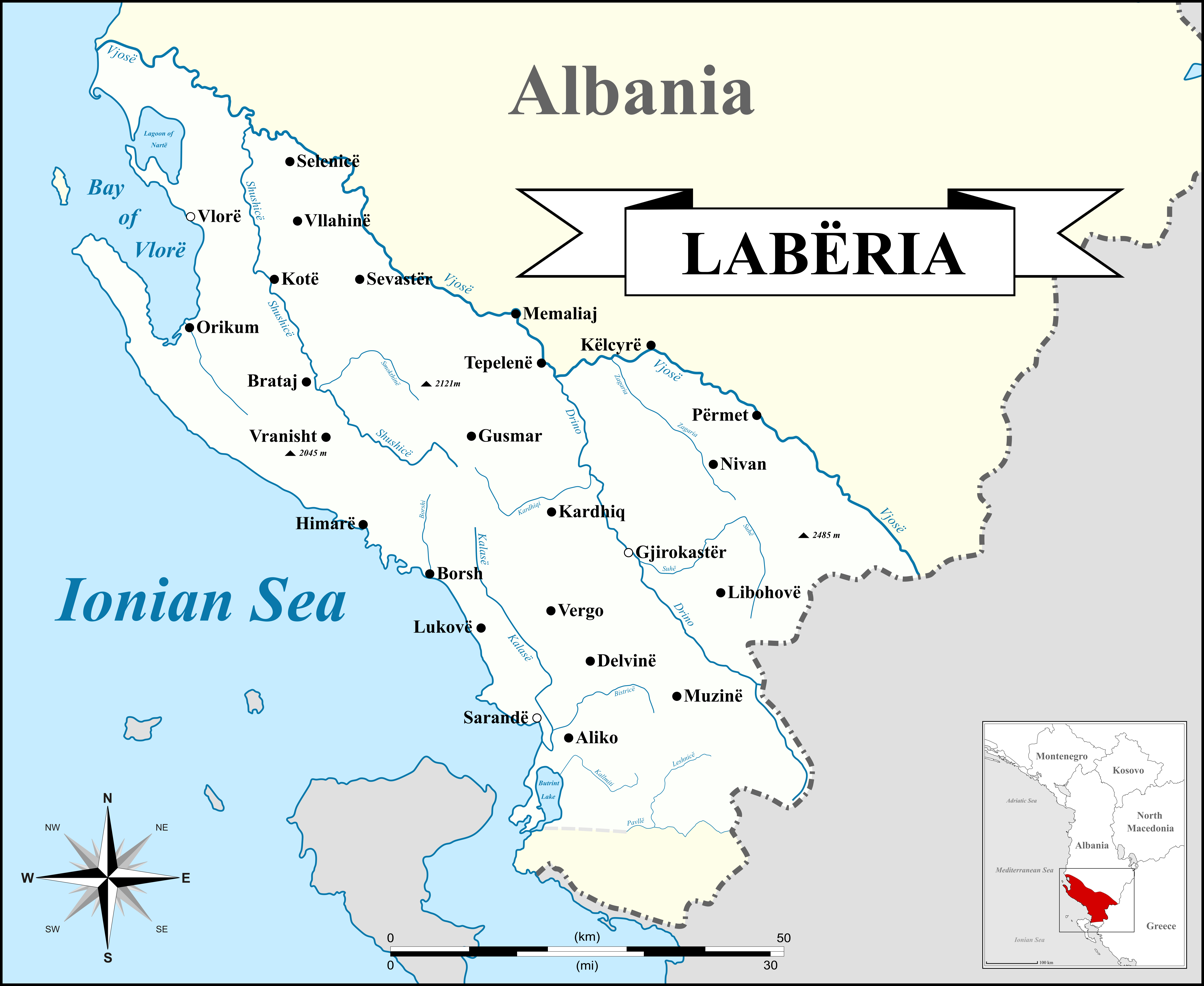
- Map of Labëria, based on the more expansive version (see Labëria#Extent)
- Largest city: Vlorë
- Time zone: UTC+1 (CET)
  - Summer (DST): UTC+2 (CEST)
- ISO 3166 code: AL

Laberia (Albanian: Labëria) is a historic region that is roughly situated in southwestern Albania. Its inhabitants are known as Labs (referred to as Albanian: Lab, pl. Lebër, also dial. sing. Lap) and its boundaries reach from Vlorë to Himara in the south, to the Greek border near Sarandë, incorporating the Kurvelesh region of Gjirokastër District and extending east to the city of Tepelenë.

== Name ==
The toponym Labëri/-a and the name of the Albanian sub-group: Lab (also Labe, Labi), pl. Lebër, are endonyms formed from the root *arb/*alb (cf. the ancient ethonym Αλβανοί, Albanoi by Ptolemy, and Αλβανοί, Αρβανίται in Byzantine sources). The variant lab-, which goes back to *alb-, resulted from a metathesis characteristic of Common Slavic, and was reborrowed in that form into Albanian. The toponym Arbëri, now used as a variant of Labëri and only to refer to a small mountainous region extending within the triangle: Vlorë-Sarandë-Tepelenë, formerly had a broader usage referring in the old times generally to Albania and Albanians (arbëror, subst. arbëresh). The variants Arbëri/Labëri were used narrowly to designate a country inhabited by the Labs, i.e. Albanians proper.

The link to the older form of the toponym was preserved until the late Ottoman period as suggested in documents of the court of Ali Pasha of Tepelena and other publications. As reported by Hahn (1854), at his time the toponym Arbërí was used in the strict sense to denote the highland area at the back of Vlorë, i.e. Kurvelesh and Labëria; however, according to him, it was used in a wider sense including also Himarë up to Delvinë, that is the ancient Chaonia.

In Ottoman times, the region became known as Laplık in Turkish, comprising the areas of Delvinë, Avlonya (Vlorë), Tepedelen (Tepelenë), Kurules (Kurvelesh), and Ergiri (Gjirokastër). The Greek name is Λιαπουριά, Liapouriá.

== History ==
In the Middle Ages the Labs were followers of the Eastern Orthodox Church but many converted to Islam during Ottoman rule, with the bulk of conversion occurring in the 18th century. Conversions were especially intense during years of conflict between the Russian Empire and the Ottoman Empire, during which some pressure was applied on Orthodox Christians by Ottoman rulers, including even low-scale forced conversion of villages, contradicting the official Ottoman tolerance for Christians. Additional reasons for conversion included discrimination and exploitation of Christians by Ottoman rulers, the previous patterns of conversion between different Christian sects and the diverse pre-Ottoman distribution of Christian faiths in the region (including Orthodoxy, Catholicism, Bogomilism, and even Arianism), the poll tax which only Christians had to pay, the poverty of the church, the mass illiteracy of priests and the fact that the language of worship was not the Albanian vernacular. Tradition holds that a mass conversion of Labs occurred during a famine in which the bishops of Himara and Delvina refused to let the Labs break fast and drink milk.

Many Labs were recruited by the Ottoman Janissary corps due to their skills and the Ottomans' initial preference for recruiting Albanians after their invasion of the Balkans. After the disbandment of the Janissary corps by Sultan Mahmud II in 1826, the Sufi branch of the Bektashi Order, a core Janissary institution, was also disbanded, and its followers executed or exiled to Southern Albania. As a result, the majority of the Labs today belong to the Bektashi faith with Orthodox Christians concentrated in the Himara coastal region as well as a few pockets throughout Vlorë district and the southern and eastern parts of the region, around Gjirokastër, Delvine and Sarande.

Ali Pasha of Tepelena or of Yanina (Ioannina), surnamed Aslan, "the Lion", or the "Lion of Yannina" (1740–1822), was born in this region. He ruled the western part of Rumelia, the Ottoman Empire's European territory which was also called Pashalik of Yanina. His court was in Ioannina. Ali had three sons: Ahmet Muhtar Pasha (served in the 1809 war against the Russians), Veli Pasha of Morea and Salih Pasha of Vlorë. Ali Pasha of Tepelena died fighting on February 5, 1822, at the age of 82.

== Geography ==
In its most extensive definition, Labëria may be used to include everything from Mallakastra and the Vjosa river down to Saranda, and in its (somewhat more common) most specific definition, it may refer only to Himara, Tepelena and Kurvelesh. In the more extensive definition, in addition to these three regions, other regions included are Vlore and its surroundings south of the Vjosa river, Lunxhëria, Mallakastra, Gjirokastër and its surroundings, Delvinë and its surroundings, Pogon, Dropull, Saranda and sometimes ( very rarely) Këlcyra and Zagori. Bordering regions include Pogon, Myzeqe, Chamëria, Dangëllia and Dishnica (as well as the border with Greece).

== Culture ==
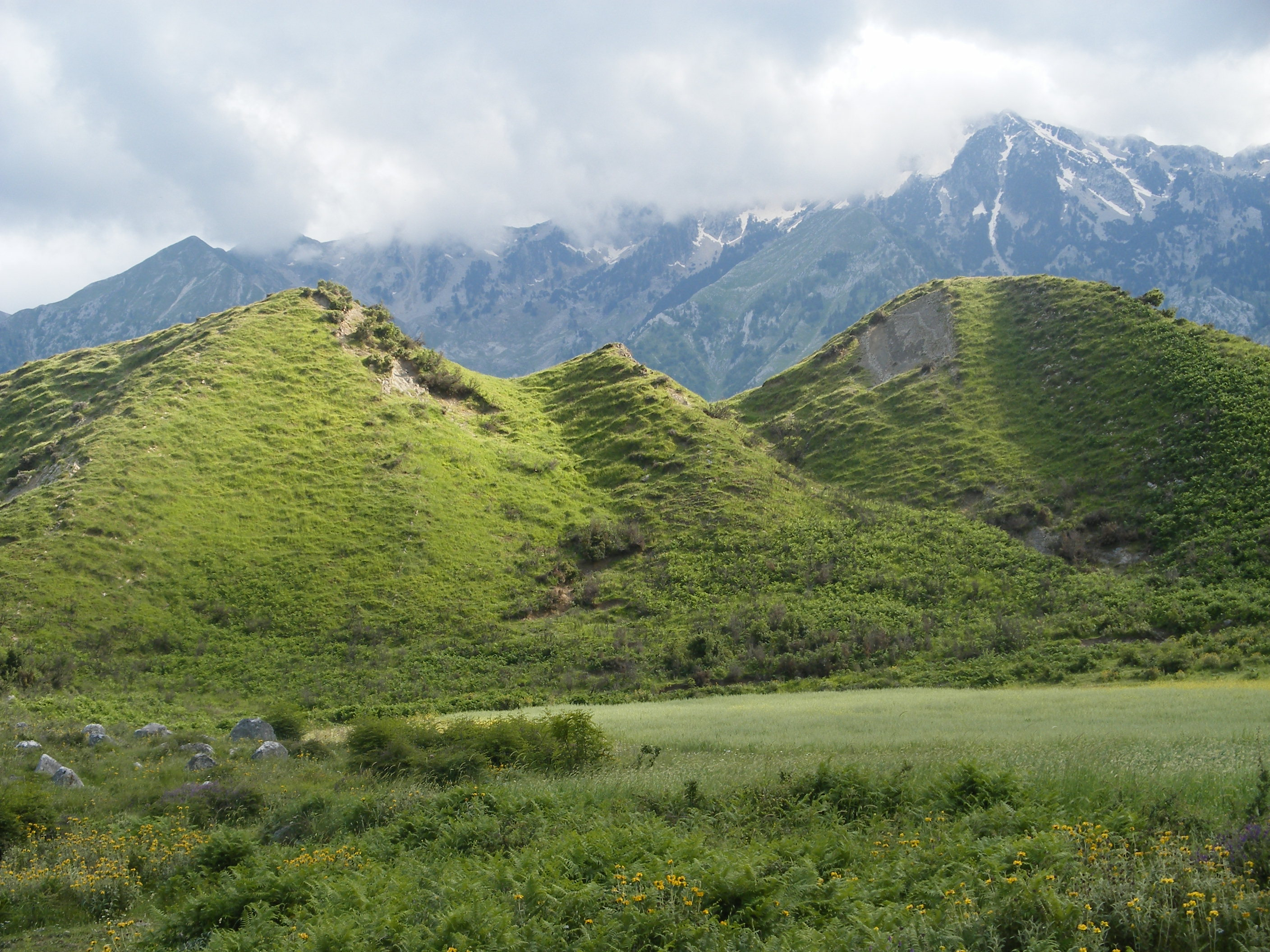
Hill formations in Horë-Vranisht.

Labëria is culturally distinguishable from the rest of Albania in its traditions and folklore. The Labs were warlike pastoral people who lived mainly in the mountains of Kurvelesh, Progonat and Vlorë during the Byzantine period and the Ottoman invasion of Albania. However, due to mass migrations to urban areas following World War II, the population is now concentrated in the cities of Vlorë, Tepelenë, Gjirokastër and Sarandë.

Pleqërishte is a genre of Albanian iso-polyphony primarily found in Labëria.

Music of Labs is polyphonic, more soft and lyrical than rugged single voiced music of Ghegs dedicated to heroism. Similarly to other clan-based Albanian mountain communities, Labs developed a codex of customary laws, the Kanun of Labëria (Albanian: Kanuni i Labërisë, Kanuni i Papa Zhulit or Kanuni i Idriz Sulit). This set of traditional unwritten laws which survived Byzantine and Ottoman periods in the isolated and inaccessible territories of southwest Albania.

During the regime of Enver Hoxha the Labs, Ghegs and Tosks were forbidden to emphasize their identity.

=== Language ===
The dialect associated with Labëria is the Lab dialect, which is particular to the region. The dialect mixes innovative and archaic features, and is closely related to the Arbëresh spoken by the old Albanian diaspora in Italy, the Arvanitika of Arvanites in Greece, and Cham Albanian.

The Himariote dialect of Greek is also spoken in the region of Himara, which is often considered part of Laberia, and other Greek dialects are spoken in the southern extremes of the region as well as in the villages of Nartë and Zvernec. Aromanian and Roma minorities that are present in some places may also speak their ancestral languages.

=== Religion ===
Historically the Labs were followers of the Eastern Orthodox Church. Literary evidence by Greek historian Aravantinos records that they converted to Islam at a time of great famine during the Ottoman period. One of the reasons was that Christian bishops refused to allow them to consume milk during fast days.

During the Ottoman era, a minority of Labs converted to Eastern Catholicism under Arberesh-led missionaries (notably in Himara in 1577); although the presence of eastern Catholicism in Labëria remains small today, and receded due to the Islamization of the wider region.

== Notable people ==
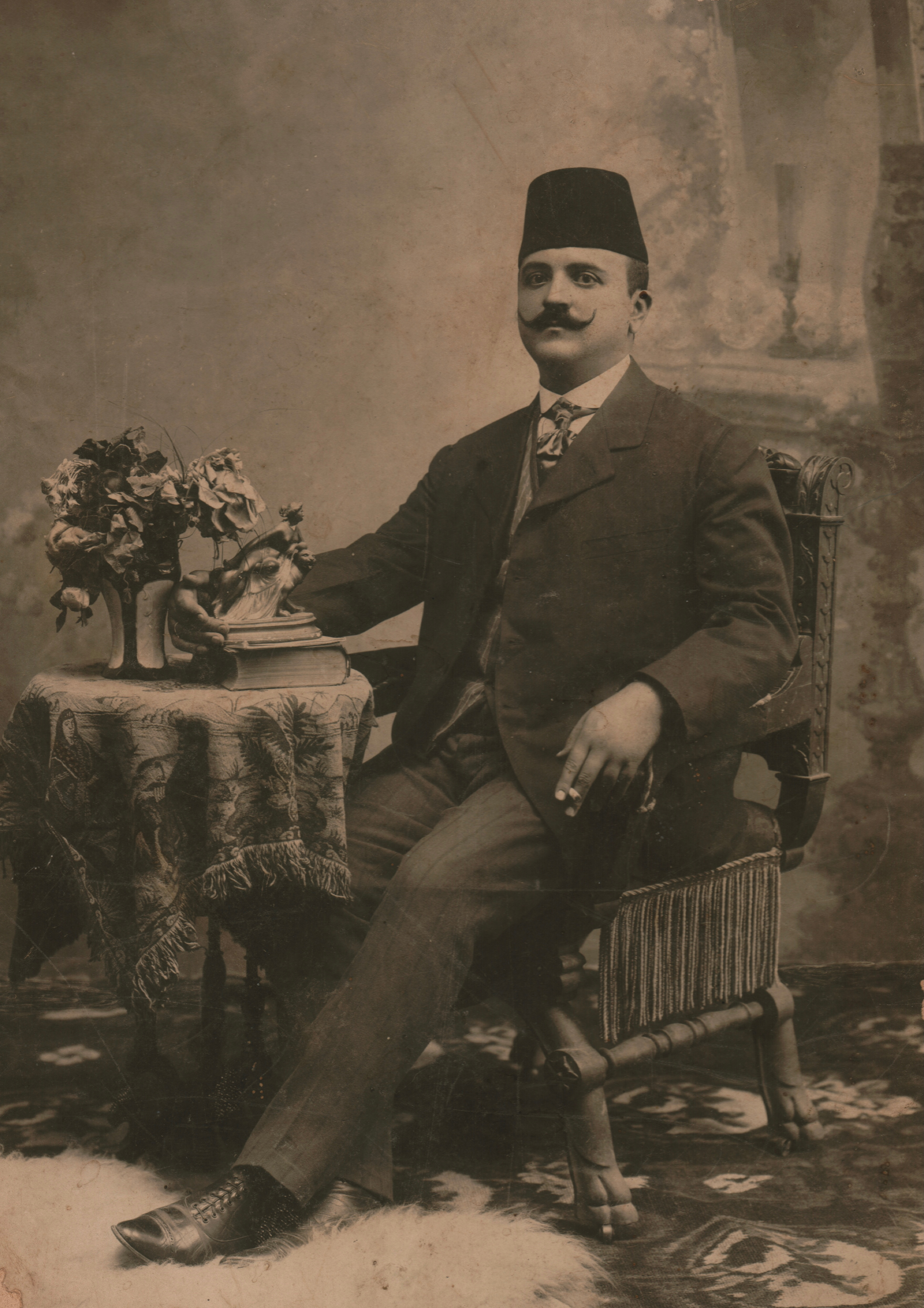
Mufid Libohova

- Kadri Azbiu – Albanian communist politician who was purged by Enver Hoxha
- Nafiz Bezhani – Albanian jurist, politician, and writer
- Tafil Buzi – Albanian rebel and warlord during the 19th century
- Adil Çarçani – Albanian communist politician
- Hasan Dosti – Albanian leader of the Balli Kombëtar, jurist and politician
- Victor Dosti – son of Hasan Dosti, political prisoner during communism
- Kadri Gjata – Albanian patriot, writer, and educator
- Zenel Gjoleka – Leader of the 1847 Southern Albanian Revolt
- Sinan Idrizi – CEO of Air Albania, born to a Cham father and Lab mother
- Hysni Kapo – Albanian communist politician, and third in command from 1945 to 1979
- Qazim Koculi – Albanian military commander during the Vlora War, and Prime Minister of Albania for one day in 1922
- Musine Kokalari – founder of Albania's early social democratic parties
- Ahmet Lepenica – Albanian nationalist, military commander and hero of the 1920 Vlora War
- Myfit Bej Libohova – Justice Minister, Minister of the Interior, Minister of Finance, and Minister of Culture, of the Libohova family
- Jakup Mato – Albanian professor
- Ava Max – Albanian-American singer with origins from Qeparo and Saranda
- Skënder Muço – Albanian lawyer, Leader of the Balli Kombëtar, and founder of one of Albania's first social democratic parties
- Mira Murati – Albanian engineer, and researcher into artificial intelligence
- Selam Musai – Albanian military commander and nationalist; died during the Vlora War
- Hodo Nivica – Leader of the 1847 Southern Albanian Revolt
- Çelo Picari – Albanian revolutionary leader of the 1847 Southern Albanian Revolt
- Ismail Qemali – Founding Father of Albania
- Urani Rumbo – Early Albanian feminist
- Avni Rustemi – Albanian teacher, militant activist, nationalist, and assassin of Essad Pasha Toptani
- Igli Tare – Albanian former footballer, coach, and nationalist
- Ali Pasha Tepelena – Albanian ruler from Tepelena located in the Labëria region

== See also ==
- Albanian Riviera
- Albanian culture
- Shushica River

== Bibliography ==
- Demiraj, Shaban (2006). The origin of the Albanians: linguistically investigated. Academy of Sciences of Albania. ISBN 9789994381715. Archived from the original on 20 November 2020.
- Desnickaja, A. V. (1973). "Language Interferences and Historical Dialectology". Linguistics. 11 (113): 41–52. doi:10.1515/ling.1973.11.113.41. S2CID 144569294.
- Gawrych, George (2006). The crescent and the eagle: Ottoman rule, Islam and the Albanians, 1874–1913. London: IB Tauris. ISBN 9781845112875.
- Viereck, Wolfgang (1993). International congress of dialectologists. Issue 76. Franz Steiner. ISBN 9783515063326.
