= Kurvelesh (region) =

Albanian ethnographic region

Kurvelesh Kurveleshi
- Ethnographic and historical region
- Kurvelesh Region
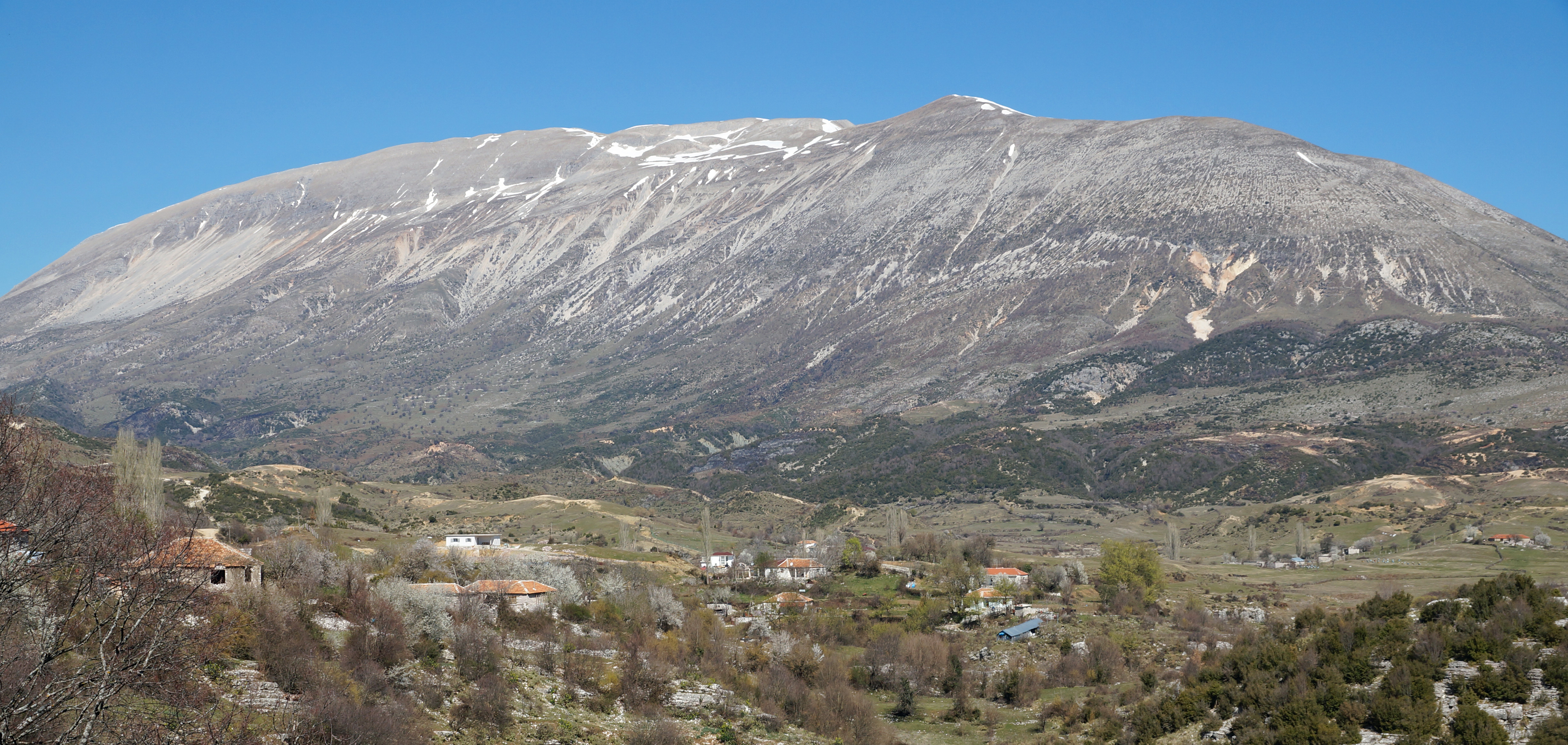
- View of Mount Këndrevica in Kurvelesh

- Location in Albania
- Coordinates: 40°14′12″N 19°52′1″E
- Country: Albania
- County: Vlorë County
- Region: Southern Mountain Range
- Municipal units: Brataj, Horë-Vranisht, Kurvelesh, Picar
- Named for: Folk legend: Arab sheikh Jabal-i Alhama

Ethnic groups
  - Albanians: Lab Albanians

Religion
- Time zone: UTC+1 (CET)
  - Summer (DST): UTC+2 (CEST)
- Considered the heart of Labëria region; known for strong tribal traditions, endogamy, and fortified tower houses.

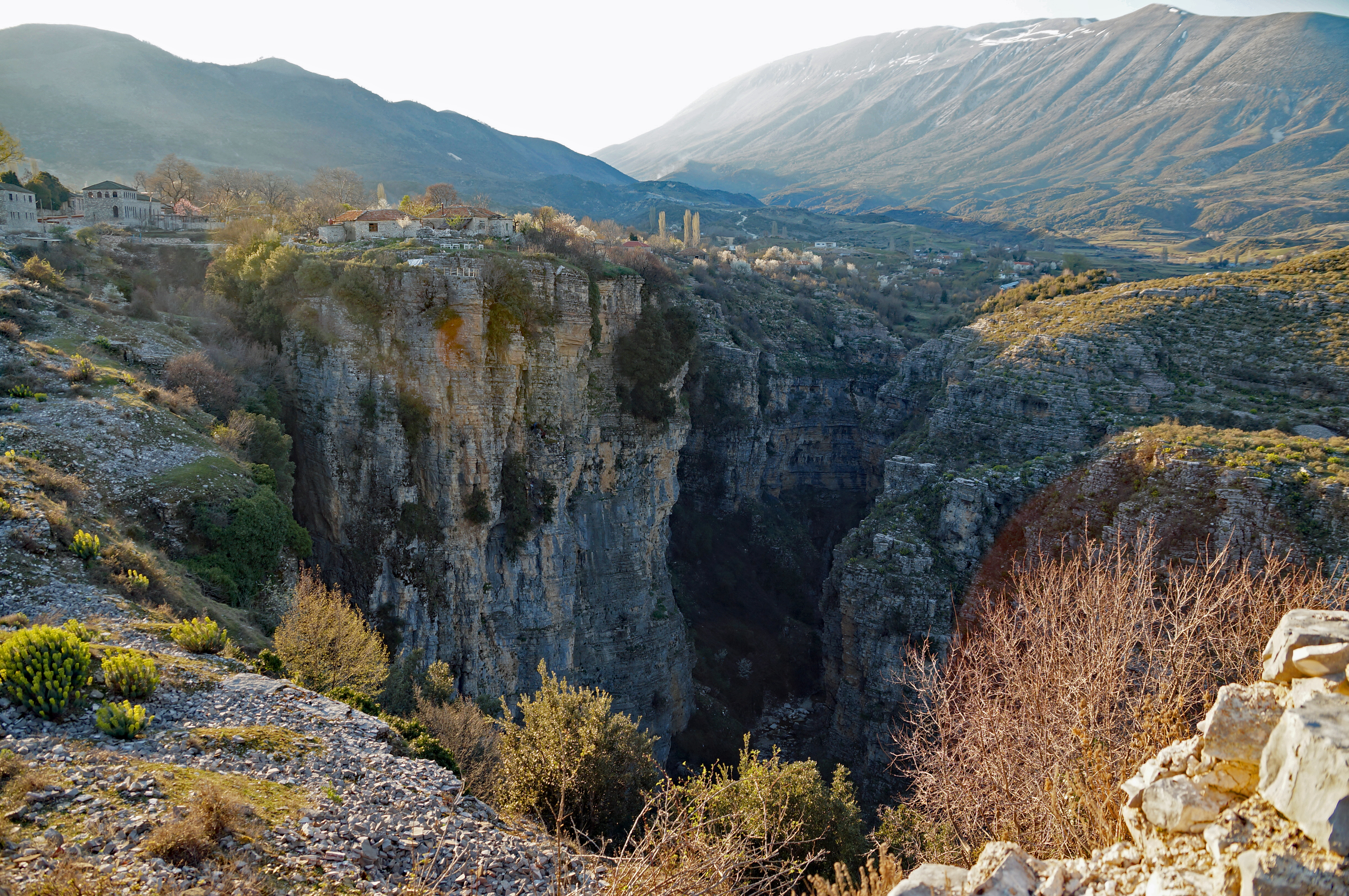
The canyon of Nivica.

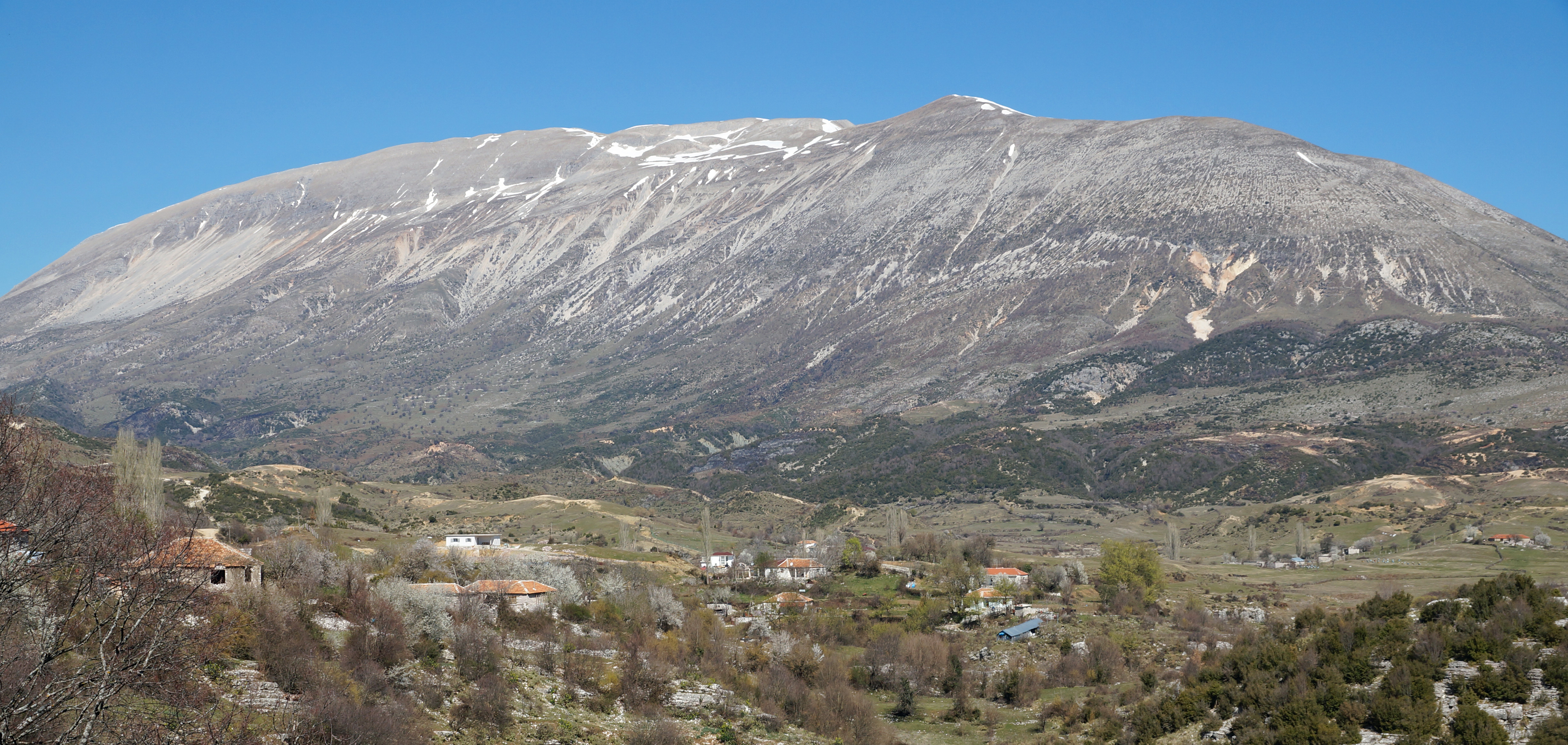
Këndrevica

Kurvelesh is a region in southern Albania, within the Southern Mountain Range. In the region, which is divided into the communes of Brataj, Horë-Vranisht, Kurvelesh and Picar, fifteen villages are located. It is considered to be the heart of the larger Labëria region. The Kurvelesh region is inhabited by Lab Albanians. Traditionally neighbourhoods of local villages in the region had houses built as fortresses lacking windows on the ground floor while the blood feud used to be a common feature of the area. The people of Kurvelesh practised endogamy by intermarrying within the villages of the region.

== History ==
An old folk etymology recorded by Evliya Çelebi in his “Travelling through southern Albania in 1670” is that an Arab sheik called Jabal-i Alhama migrated to the region and named it Quryelesh (Kurvelesh) mountains, meaning Qurayshi as he was from this tribe and his followers who came with him. However this is likely untrue and was used as a folk story for benefits within the Ottoman Empire.

The inhabitants of Kurveleshi revolted against the Ottoman Empire in 1431/1432 and in 1481. It has been suggested that a reason to resist the establishment of the Ottoman rule seems to have been the attempt of the Ottomans to introduce a centralised administration, which was in contrast to the strong tribal loyalties and local interests that were deep rooted in the mountains of the region, because they have never been incorporated into a feudal system or ruled by a central government. At the beginning of the 19th century the Ottoman Albanian ruler of the Pashalik of Yanina, Ali Pasha, reached an agreement with the Kurveleshi population, not to trespass their territories, which at that time were larger than the area they inhabit today. Kurvelesh was centre of the Albanian Revolt of 1847 directed against Ottoman Tanzimat reforms.

== Culture ==
The inhabitants of the Kurvelesh region speak the Lab dialect of the Albanian language and are Muslim. In Kurvelesh the practice of the Muranë (tumuli for the cult of the ancestor / hero) has been attested in some mountains like Këndrevica. Bolla e Shtëpisë and Kulshedra are some of the Albanian mythological figures that are also found among the Kurveleshi population. In Nowruz or in the Albanian Spring Day (Dita e Verës) in some villages of Kurvelesh, people used to address rainmaking prayers to the deity for plants and cattle. The practice of gjakmarrja (blood feud) is found in Kurvelesh.

=== Historical social organization ===
The mountain region of Kurveleshi was the last example of a tribal system among southern Albanians. It was regulated by the Code of Zuli (Kanuni i Papa Zhulit/Zulit or Kanuni i Idriz Sulit). In Kurvelesh the names of the villages were built as collective pluralia, which designated the tribal settlements. For instance, Lazarat can be considered as a toponym that was originated to refer to the descendants of Lazar and Progonat meaning descendants of Progon.

== Notable people ==
- Sali Nivica, politician, writer, journalist and teacher.
- Nafiz Bezhani, jurist, politician and writer.
- Zenel Gjoleka, leader of the Albanian Revolt of 1847.
- Muzafer Korkuti, archaeologist and Vice President of the Academy of Sciences of Albania.
- Jakup Mato, head of Centre of Art Studies of the Academy of Sciences of Albania.
- Hodo Nivica, leader of the Albanian Revolt of 1847.
- Çelo Picari, leader of the Albanian Revolt of 1847.

== Sources ==
- Desnickaja, A. V. (1973). "Language Interferences and Historical Dialectology". Linguistics. 11 (113): 41–52. doi:10.1515/ling.1973.11.113.41. S2CID 144569294.
- Giakoumis, K. (2004). "The Ottoman Advance and Consolidation in Epiros and Albania During the Fourteenth and Fifteenth Centuries". Ηπεηρωηηθό Ηκεροιόγηο. 23: 217–244.
- Mangalakova, Tanya (2004). "The Kanun in Present-Day Albania, Kosovo, and Montenegro". International Centre for Minority Studies and Intercultural Relations. Sofia.
- Tirta, Mark (2004). Petrit Bezhani (ed.). Mitologjia ndër shqiptarë (in Albanian). Tirana: Mësonjëtorja. ISBN 99927-938-9-9.
