= Ismet Toto =

Albanian writer (1908–1937)

- Born: 1908; Progonat, Tepelenë, Albania
- Died: July 12, 1937 (aged 28–29); Gjirokastër, Albania
- Education: Sapienza University of Rome
- Occupations: Writer, revolutionary, bureaucrat
- Family: Toto

Ismet Toto (Progonat, 1908 – Gjirokastër, July 12, 1937) was an Albanian bureaucrat, publicist, writer and political activist. Along with Vangjel Koça, Branko Merxhani and Nebil Çika, he was one of the main representatives of the Neo-Albanianism (neo-shqiptarizma) school of thought in the '30s.

== Biography ==
Toto was born on 1908 in Progonat, Kurvelesh, Labëria into an Albanian Bektashi Muslim family. He graduated from the American Technical School in Tirana and went on to study in economics in the Sapienza University of Rome. During the early 1930s he became known for his writings on the topics of religion, philosophy and ethics. His tract "Grindje me klerin" was amongst the first and one of the most known anti-religious works in Albania.

== Political activities and death ==
He joined the failed Delvina uprising of 1937, and was captured by government forces. On 12 July 1937 he was executed by hanging in the prison of Gjirokastër.

== Published works ==
- "Grindje me Klerin" – polemic (1934)
- "Gazi-Kemal Ataturk" – biography (1935)
- "Plato" – translation (1936)
- "Bota e një djali kryengritës" – sent to the press in 1944
