= Abdyl =

Abdyl is an Albanian masculine given name. Notable people with the name include:

- Abdyl Dylaveri, Albanian politician
- Abdyl Frashëri (1839–1892), Albanian diplomat
- Abdyl Këllezi (1919–1977), Albanian politician
- Abdyl bej Koka, Albanian feudal lord
- Abdyl Xhaja (1943–2025), Albanian economist and politician, government minister
- Abdyl Ypi (1876–1920), Albanian politician

== See also ==
- Abdul
