= Abdyl bej Koka =

Albanian feudal

Abdyl bej Koka was an Albanian feudal, who played an important role in several Albanian revolts in the 19th century.

== Life ==
Abdyl bej Koka was born in Delvinë. He was a member of a rich local family that owned large tracts of land. Unsatisfied with the Ottoman rule of Albania, he joined local revolts in the early 19th century, and soon became one of the most important leaders of Albanian revolts against the Ottoman Empire. In 1828, Koka was among the Albanian leaders who participated at a convention in Berat, where a list of requests was compiled and sent to the Sublime Porte. Among the requests were the removal of non-Albanians from official posts in territories with Albanian population, and the replacement of them with Albanian officials. After the failure of the convention's goals, Koka continued his activities, collaborating with other leaders such as Tafil Buzi, Zenel Gjoleka, Mahmut Bajraktari, Ali bej Frakulla in various revolts in 1833, 1834, 1835 and 1837. In 1830 Koka was invited, together with a number of Albanian leaders, to a meeting in Bitola. The meeting was supposed to rectify the disagreements between them and the Ottoman authorities. Koka decided to not attend, which turned out to be the right decision, as the attendees were massacred.

== See also ==
- Albanian revolts of 1833–39
