= Hito Çako =

Albanian politician and lieutenant general

- Born: Hito Shaqo Çako; 2 March 1923; Progonat, Kurvelesh, Principality of Albania
- Died: 5 November 1975 (aged 52); Tirana, People's Republic of Albania
- Military career
- Allegiance: Albania
- Branch: Albanian People's Army Naval Force
- Service years: 1961–1974
- Rank: Lieutenant General
- Commands: Naval Combat Fleet in Pashaliman
- Cause of death: Execution by firing squad
- Criminal charges: High treason
- Criminal penalty: death penalty

Hito Shaqo Çako (2 March 1923 – 5 November 1975) was an Albanian politician and lieutenant general of the Albanian People's Army. He also was among the 154 persons to whom the title "Hero of the People" ( Hero i Popullit ) was awarded.

== Life ==
Born in Progonat on 2 March 1923, he joined the National Liberation Movement (LANÇ) and the Albanian Communist Party in 1942. He was interned in Italy in 1942–3 until the country's capitulation to the allied forces. Upon returning to Albania, he joined the 5th Attacking Brigade and was promoted to the rank of political commissar. In 1944 he was promoted to the rank of vice-commander of the 2nd Attacking Corps. Of his relatives Rakip (1923–1943) died in Shëntriadhë fighting the Italian army, while Remzi and Shefqet (1924–1944) died fighting the German army in Cepo and Qesarat respectively.

After Teme Sejko's purge he acted as political vice-admiral of the fleet until Sejko's replacement by Abdi Mati. Çako was a long-standing member of the party's Central Committee and a deputy of Vlorë County in the Albanian parliament until 1974, when in the first phases of the Sino-Albanian split he was accused of being a member of a pro-PRC coup d'état headed by party leader Beqir Balluku. He was executed by firing squad in 1975.

On 18 July 2000, his body was exhumed at the request of his family and interred together with Balluku's body in a secret grave in Hore-Vranisht in Vlorë District.
