= Çika =

Çika may refer to:

- Mount Çika, a mountain in Albania
- Ikbal Çika (d. 1956), Albanian journalist and women's rights campaigner
- Nebil Çika (1893–1944), Albanian philosopher and writer
