= Cika =

Cika may refer to:

- Mount Çika, a mountain in Albania
- Ikbal Çika (d. 1956), Albanian journalist and women's rights campaigner
- Nebil Çika (1893–1944), Albanian philosopher and writer
- Čika, a medieval nun in Croatia
- Cika cattle, a breed from Slovenia

== See also ==
- Kika
