= Vangjel =

Vangjel is an Albanian masculine given name. Notable people with the name include:

- Vangjel Adhami (born 1948), Albanian chess player
- Vangjel Çamçe (1877–1946), Albanian Orthodox cleric
- Vangjel Çërrava (born 1941), Albanian politician
- Vangjel Dule (born 1968), politician who belongs to the ethnic Greek minority of Albania
- Vangjel Koça (1900–1943), Albanian journalist and fascist
- Vangjel Meksi (1770–1823), Albanian physician, writer, and translator
- Vangjel Mile (born 1986), Albanian footballer
- Vangjel Tavo (born 1969), Albanian politician
- Vangjel Zguro (born 1993), Albanian footballer
