= Kallarat =

- Village
- Location within Albania
- Coordinates: 40°12′N 19°44′E
- Country: Albania
- County: Vlorë
- Municipality: Himarë
- Administrative unit: Horë-Vranisht
- Time zone: UTC+1 (CET)
  - Summer (DST): UTC+2 (CEST)

Kallarat is a village in the Kurvelesh region in Vlorë County, Albania. It lies in south-west Albania, on the river Shushicë, 24 km from the Ionian Sea. It was part of the former municipality Horë-Vranisht. At the 2015 local government reform it became part of the municipality Himarë. Its name contains the Albanian suffix -at, widely used to form toponyms from personal names and surnames.
