= Qendro =

Qendro is a surname. Notable people with the surname include:

- Anesti Qendro (born 1973), Albanian footballer
- Koço Qendro (born 1926), Albanian actor
