= Fashizmi =

Albanian daily newspaper

- Publisher: Albanian Fascist Party
- Editor: Fejzi Alizoti
- General manager: Vangjel Koça
- Founded: May 24, 1939
- Ceased publication: March 1940
- Political alignment: Fascism
- Language: Albanian-Italian
- Country: Albanian Kingdom

Fashizmi ('Fascism') was a daily Albanian-Italian bilingual newspaper published from Tirana, Albanian Kingdom 1939-1940. It functioned as the official organ of the Albanian Fascist Party. Fejzi Alizoti was the editor of Fashizmi. Vangjel Koça served as the managing director of the newspaper.

After Albania fell to Italian rule in 1939, the Italian authorities banned the two daily newspapers of Tirana (Shtypi and Drita) and Fashizmi was set up to fill the void and convey the official Italian positions to the Albanian populace. The newspaper was set up by the General Directorate for Press, Propaganda and Tourism. The first issue was published on May 24, 1939. It was the sole daily newspaper published in Albania at the time. Through an agreement between the (Italian) National Fascist Party inspector and the General Directorate four regional weekly and biweekly bilingual fascist organs were set up as well.

The newspaper covered political, social, economical and literary affairs. The issues of Fashizmi contained both Gheg and Tosk orthography, as well as material in Italian on its last page (with the title Il Fascismo). Issues contained 4-6 pages, with a format of 42 by 57.2 centimetres (16.5 in × 22.5 in).

Fashizmi failed to gain wide readership in Tirana. In a move to downplay concerns that the newspaper was merely a propaganda mouthpiece Fashizmi was closed down in March 1940 and replaced by Tomori (the name of an Albanian mountain). However, the Italian authorities gave no official explanation to the closure of Fashizmi.
