= Tafil Buzi =

Albanian rebel

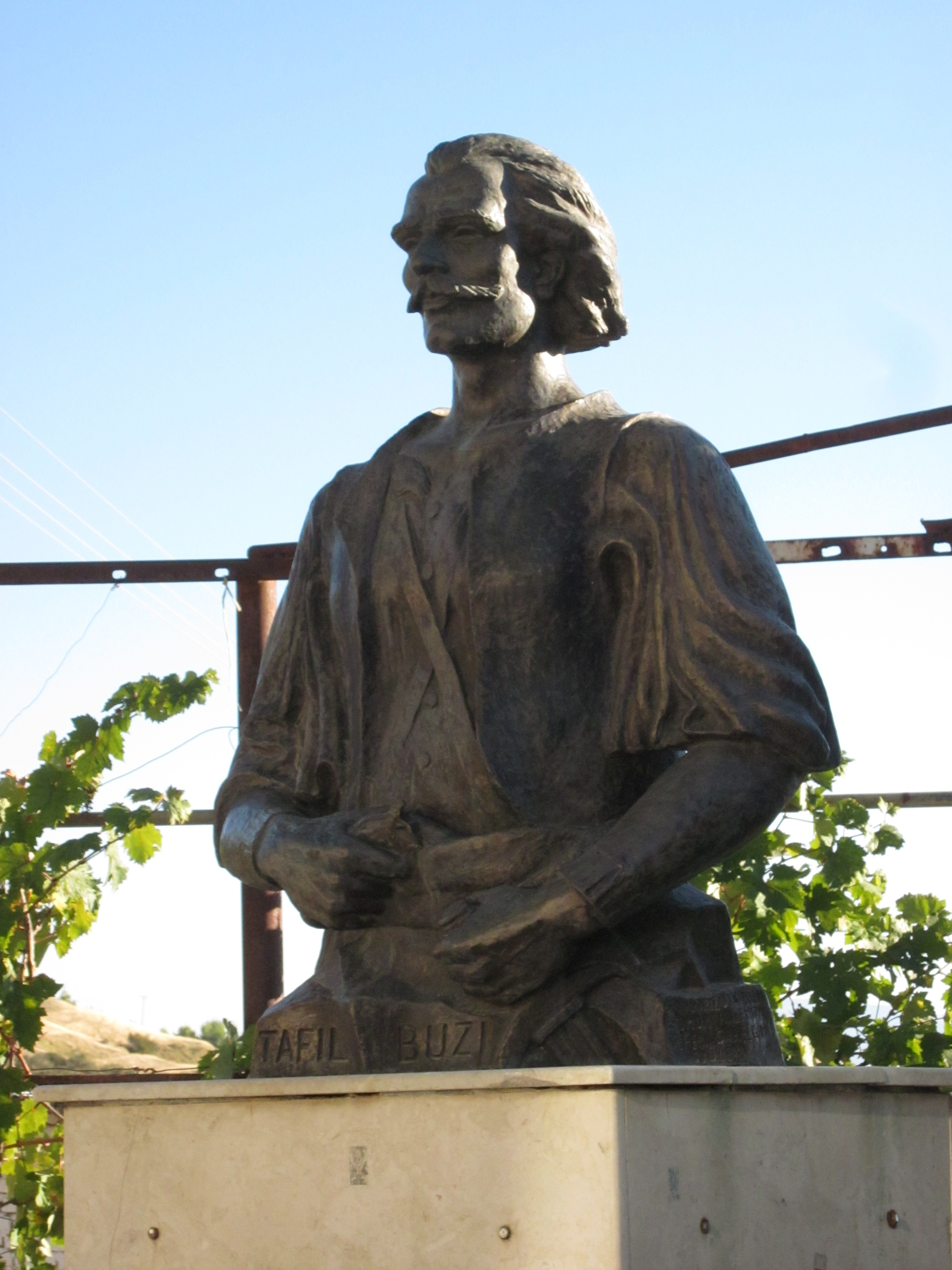
- Tafil Buzi statue in Buz, Albania
- Born: 1792; Tepelena, Albania (then Ottoman Empire)
- Died: 1844 (aged 51–52); Ottoman Syria
- Military career
- Awards: Honor of the Nation

Tafil Buzi (1792–1844) was an Albanian leader and fighter, known for his role in various rebellions against the Ottoman government of southern Albania during the Albanian Revolts of 1833-1839. Throughout his uprisings, he maintained contacts with Muhammad Ali of Egypt. As punishment for his continuous rebellions, he was captured and interned by the Ottoman government in 1840. In 1842, he was pardoned and acted as leader in service of the Ottoman government in Syria. He died there in 1844.

== Biography ==
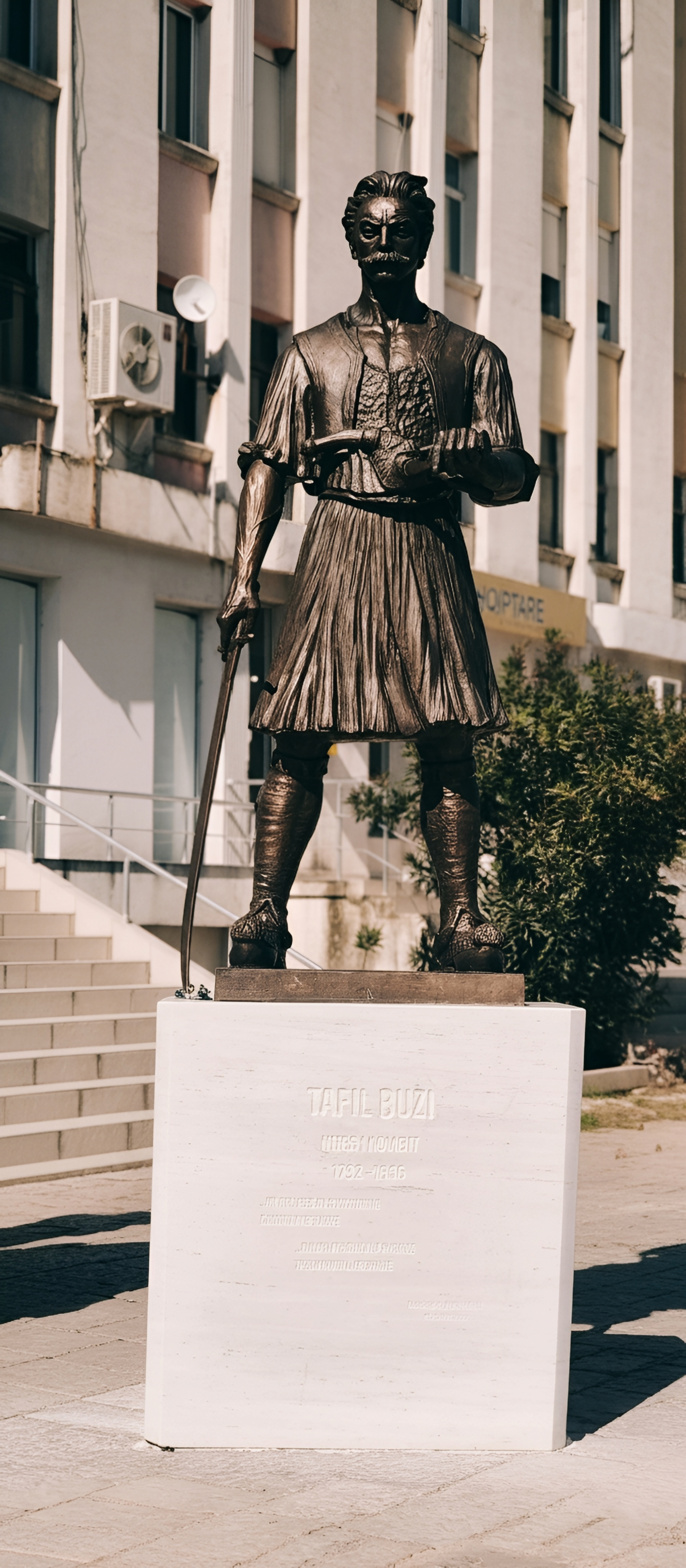
Tafil Buzi statue in Tepelenë

After the Massacre of the Albanian Beys in 1830, a number of anti-Ottoman uprisings would occur throughout Albanian-inhabited territories, with Buzi being one of the main figureheads on the Albanian side. Inspired by the successes of other Albanian revolts, the regions of Vlorë, Berat and Skrapar rose in revolt under Buzi, Zenel Gjoleka and Çelo Picari, requesting the appointment of Albanian governors and officials in the rebel districts and the abolishment of new taxes.

Buzi's rebellion in 1833 contested the provincial administration and conscription laws, as well as new Ottoman tax reforms. Threatened by the Albanian rebel chiefs, Mustafa Nuri Pasha (the governor of Trikala), offered him the position of Derbend superintendent in the districts of Agrafa and Dömeke to prevent any further attacks in the region; it is possible that Buzi retained this position for a short period of time.

Buzi would once again lead an uprising in 1834-1835 at the request of the people of Berat, gathering an army of 10,000 men; the rebellion had spread in the same regions as it did in the previous year, and after successfully besieging the castle of Berat, a committee was created in the liberated city. Buzi was elected as military commander, and Abaz bey Lushnja as the political leader. In January 1835, the rebel committee signed an agreement with the Ottomans, who promised to fulfil their requests at the cost of disarmament. When the agreement was quickly violated by the Ottoman government, the rebels under Buzi rose up again, this time marching to Ioannina. There, Buzi made a proclamation for all the Albanians to take up arms against the Ottomans. He also asked for the help of Mehmet Ali of Egypt. Alarmed, the Ottoman government sent numerous military forces against the rebels. Buzi was soon forced to accept an amnesty and to withdraw to his village in May of 1835.

In the summer of 1836, a new uprising began in the Vlorë region. The rebels were led by Buzi yet again, but with little success.

The Albanian revolts led by leaders such as Tafil Buzi and Zylyftar Poda throughout the 1830's concerned the Greek press, as the Albanians were characterised by their constant rebellion against central authority.

After his internment and subsequent pardon, Buzi raised 3,000 Albanian mercenaries to fight in Lebanon in 1842; some of these Albanian mercenaries became notorious due to having been responsible for the widespread disorders in Beirut that followed.

== See also ==
- Andrea Manesi
- Abdyl bej Koka
