= Progonat =

- Village
- Location within Albania
- Coordinates: 40°12′48″N 19°56′41″E
- Country: Albania
- County: Gjirokastër
- Municipality: Tepelenë
- Administrative unit: Kurvelesh
- Elevation: 950 m (3,120 ft)
- Time zone: UTC+1 (CET)
  - Summer (DST): UTC+2 (CEST)

Progonat is a village in the former Kurvelesh municipality, Gjirokastër County, Albania. It is the largest village of upper Kurvelesh and until 1992 was the administrative center of the commune. At the 2015 local government reform it became part of the municipality Tepelenë.

== Name ==
Its name contains the Albanian suffix -at, widely used to form toponyms from personal names and surnames.

== History ==
First attested in the Ottoman register of 1432, the village at that time was documented to have six houses, but the population is considered to have been larger. Progonat was part of the timar of Yusuf Bey, an Ottoman sipahi. However, in 1432 as in other regions of Albania the local population revolted under Gjergj Arianiti, while Yusuf Bey was killed during the battles. During the 17th century many families migrated from Progonat to other areas of Albania in order to avoid heavy taxation and the Islamization campaigns of the Ottoman Empire. The migrants founded the communes of Lazarat in Gjirokastër and Progër in Devoll, while another group settled in the Albanian Riviera.

Evliya Çelebi reports that the village had 160 houses in 1630.

In 1847 the population revolted against the Ottomans and in Progonat, one of the first areas that joined the rebels the Ottoman officials were evicted. In 1854 volunteers from Progonat under Alem Toto fought against the Greek troops that had attacked the region around Ioannina. In 1878 82 volunteers under Bejo Gani as part of the Kurvelesh volunteer forces victoriously fought against another Greek landing near Lëkurës. In 1908 the club Arbëria was founded in Progonat by Shaqo Buxo and Arif Toto, local activists of the Albanian National Awakening. In 1910 the Ottoman authorities banned the organization, but it continued its activities covertly. In 1911-2 during the general revolt that led to the Albanian Declaration of Independence under Shaqo Buxo the Ottoman officials were again evicted.

During the Balkan Wars the village was burnt and the population fled to the vicinity of Vlorë. In 1916 the villagers returned to Progonat and the rebuilding of the village began. In 1920 two platoons from Progonat under Neki Daci and Musto Buxo participated in the Vlora War as part of the Kurvelesh battalion. On June 5–6 Neki Beco's platoon, which consisted of 60 volunteers took part in the capture of Tepelenë, while Buxo's 30-man platoon at the same time attacked the Italian garrison of Kotë. After the war eight of the platoons' soldiers were decorated for acts of bravery. In 1924 Progonat supported the overthrow of the monarchy and Fan Noli's government and volunteer platoons from the village fought in Ndroq and Kozarë.

Progonat sustained heavy damages during World War II as it was burnt several times. In July 1942 the National Liberation Movement (LANÇ) council of Progonat headed by Felek Lela and Musa Kërma was founded, followed by Communist and Anti-fascist Youth organizations. By the end of the year the village's 70-troop platoon had been also founded. The other major resistance organization founded its councils in 1943 under the leadership of Ismail Golemi. After World War II the village was rebuilt and the arable land expanded.

== Notable people ==
- Hito Çako, politician and military commander
- Asim Zeneli, partisan commander during World War II
- Ismet Toto, bureaucrat, publicist, writer, and revolutionary
