= Vllahat =

- Village
- Location within Albania
- Coordinates: 39°56′31″N 20°4′46″E
- Country: Albania
- County: Vlorë
- Municipality: Delvinë
- Administrative unit: Delvinë
- Time zone: UTC+1 (CET)
  - Summer (DST): UTC+2 (CEST)
- Postal Code: 9704
- Area Code: 0815

Vllahat is a village in Vlorë County in southern Albania, 13 km northeast of Saranda and 2 km southeast of Delvina. It is part of the municipality Delvinë. The village is inhabited by Muslim Albanians.
