= Bërdicë =

- Administrative unit
- Location within Albania
- Coordinates: 42°1′N 19°29′E
- Country: Albania
- County: Shkodër
- Municipality: Shkodër
  - Administrative unit: 31.02 km^{2} (11.98 sq mi)

Population (2011)
  - Administrative unit: 5,773
  - Administrative unit density: 186.1/km^{2} (482.0/sq mi)
- Time zone: UTC+1 (CET)
  - Summer (DST): UTC+2 (CEST)

Bërdicë is a former municipality in the Shkodër County, northwestern Albania. At the 2015 local government reform it became a subdivision of the municipality Shkodër. The population at the 2011 census was 5,773.

== Settlements ==
There are 7 settlements within Bërdicë.

1. Beltojë
2. Bërdicë e Madhe
3. Bërdicë e Mesme
4. Bërdicë e Sipërme
5. Mali Hebaj
6. Mllojë
7. Trush
