= Themistoklis Bamichas =

Greek politician (1875–1930)

Themistoklis Bamichas (Greek: Θεμιστοκλής Μπαμίχας; 1875–1930) was a Greek politician and representative of Northern Epirus in the Paris Peace Conference in 1919.

Bamichas was born in Delvina, modern southern Albania, then Ottoman Empire. After finishing ground level studies in his home town, he went to Geneva, where he studied law. Back in Delvina, he was involved in various patriotic initiatives and in 1914 he had to move to nearby Corfu, Greece. However, on the same year he returned he participated in the struggle for the establishment of the Autonomous Republic of Northern Epirus. In the 1915 elections, while Northern Epirus was under temporary Greek control, he was elected as a member of the Greek Parliament. During this period he cooperated closely with the later anti-Venizelist Ion Dragoumis. In 1919 he went to the Paris Peace Conference as part of the Northern Epirote delegation under Alexandros Karapanos. Bamichas lived the rest of his life in Corfu.

He published in Corfu the Codex of the Church of the city of Delvina (Greek: Κώδιξ του Ναού της Πόλεως του Δελβίνου) which contains significant historical information about the forced 17th century islamizations and persecutions of the Christian element in Delvina and the wider region.
