= Andrea Manesi =

Albanian leader

Andrea Manesi was an Albanian leader who organized a revolt in 1607 against the Ottoman Empire. He declared himself to be the second Skanderbeg, instructed by celestial beings to depose the Sultan and take his place. Gaining fame as having miraculous abilities and helping the poor, he increased the number of his supporters until the revolt was put to an end by the Ottoman army.

== Life ==
Andrea Manesi was born in Qullëz, a village between Lezhë and Shkodër in northwest Albania. Raised in a period of intense conflict between the Ottoman Empire and Albanians seeking independence, in 1607 he started to claim that he was contacted by celestial beings, and instructed by them to take control of the empire. Manesi claimed that he was a successor of Skanderbeg, the Albanian leader who fought against the Ottomans, and that Sultan Ahmed I had no right to rule. Claims about him making miracles and helping poor people emerged. In front of 3000 Albanian men, he foresaw attempts by the Sultan to kill him. Soon Manesi, after taking control of the area and supported by ever growing numbers of rebels, reduced taxes and called on local officials to do their job honestly. After some regions of Albania, such as Dukagjini, Kthella and Selita joined the revolt, Andrea Manesi was invited to pay a visit to the Sublime Porte but refused to do so. As a response, the Sultan ordered a large number of troops to attack the rebellious regions, though Manesi and his supporters continued their activities until 1610. After failing to secure support from Spain, the revolt was definitely put to an end.

== Legacy ==
Andrea Manesi is a rather obscure figure in historiography. His history is valuable not only in the context of Albanian-Ottoman relations of that time, but also in demonstrating mechanisms of myth creation as well. Emerging from the status of an ordinary person, by realizing the importance of gaining fame, he reached the status of a regional leader.

== See also ==
- Albanian revolts of 1833–39
- Albanian revolt of 1432–1436
- Ottoman Albania

== Sources ==
- Instituti i Historisë (1967). Studime historike, Volume 4. Akademia e Shkencave.
- Pulaha, Selami (2002). Historia e popullit shqiptar, Vellimi 1. Botimet Toena.
- Zeqo, Moikom (July 17, 2010). "Dy shqiptarë të 4 shekujve më parë". gazetadita.al. Dita. Archived from the original on June 12, 2018.
