= Picar =

- Administrative unit
- Location within Albania
- Coordinates: 40°10′N 20°3′E
- Country: Albania
- County: Gjirokastër
- Municipality: Gjirokastër

Population (2011)
  - Administrative unit: 937
- Time zone: UTC+1 (CET)
  - Summer (DST): UTC+2 (CEST)

Picar is a village and a former municipality in the Gjirokastër County, southern Albania. At the 2015 local government reform it became a subdivision of the municipality Gjirokastër. The population at the 2011 census was 937. The municipal unit consists of the villages Picar, Shtëpëz, Kolonjë, Golem and Kaparjel which are all inhabited by Bektashi Albanians.

== Notable people ==
- Çelo Picari, one of the leaders of the Albanian Revolt of 1847.
