= Albanian revolts of 1833–1839 =

Rebellions in Albania against the Ottoman Empire

The Albanian revolts of 1833–1839 took place in Albania as a reaction against the new centralizing policy of Ottoman administration.

== Background ==
The influence of Albanian beys and agas had dissipated during the periods in which the Bushatllinjtë of Shkodër and Ali Pasha Tepelena ruled their Albanian pashaliks within the Ottoman Empire. Once their rule had ended, old and powerful Muslim families across Albanian-inhabited territories attempted to regain their positions and opposed the centralistic policies of the Sublime Porte. Political unrest had initially begun in the south, but it was more violent in the north. The beys and agas of southern Albania, who had initially sided with the Ottomans during the Greek War of Independence in 1821, abandoned the battlefield due to not being paid their contractual payment by the Sultan's High Command.

In 1829, when both the Greek Revolution and the Russo-Turkish War had concluded, Sultan Mahmud II decided to break the Albanians' disobedience and pacify them. In 1830, the southern Albanian beys were invited to Manastir under the pretext that they were to be rewarded for their efforts in the Greek revolution, but were deceitfully massacred by Ottoman forces. Nonetheless, the massacre did not end opposition to the rule of the Ottomans, and a number of Albanian uprisings would follow.

== Uprising in Shkodër in 1833 ==
Uprising in Shkodër in 1833
Location	Shkodër, Sanjak of Scutari, Ottoman Empire
Result	Albanian victory

Belligerents
Albanian Rebels	Ottoman Empire

Strength
4,000 Rebels	Unknown

On 10 April 1833 about 4,000 armed Albanians from Shkodër and the surrounding areas entered the city occupying the main market and asking for the abolition of taxes and the application of old privileges granted before by the Sultan to the region. Trying to calm down the rebels, the Turkish governor, Namik Pasha, promised to solve the problems. Inadvertently, in August 1833 he sent a military expedition to push the rebels out of the market which they still possessed. A fierce fighting took place and the Ottoman expedition withdrew. The rebels sent a delegation to Istanbul to ask the Sultan for the replacement of Namik Pasha. While the Albanian delegation was in Istanbul the Ottoman forces under the lead of Namik Pasha sieged the city of Shkodër and started several attacks during a three months period, but the city resisted them. After three months of siege the Ottoman forces withdraw in December 1833. Alarmed by the continuous uprisings, which were also happening in Southern Albania at that time, the Ottoman government accepted the rebel requests and replaced the unpopular governor Namik Pasha with another official.

== Uprising in South Albania in 1833 ==
Uprising in South Albania in 1833
Location	South Albania, Ottoman Empire
Result	Albanian victory

Belligerents
Albanian Rebels	Ottoman Empire

Commanders and leaders
Balil Nesho; Tafil Buzi; Zenel Gjoleka; Çelo Picari	Emin Pasha

Strength
Unknown	Unknown

In the beginning of July 1833 the inhabitants of Tepelenë under the leadership of Balil Nesho rose up against the new Ottoman governor Emin Pasha, son of Mehmet Reshit Pasha. The revolt was spread in the nearby regions of Gjirokastër and Delvinë. The Ottoman forces led by Emin Pasha attacked the rebels in the Peshkopi Pass. Unprepared, the rebels withdrew in the village of Luzat and, when Ottoman forces attacked them there, the Ottomans were soundly defeated. Inspired by the first successes, other regions of Vlorë, Berat and Skrapar, rose up in rebellion under the leadership of Tafil Buzi, Zenel Gjoleka and Çelo Picari. In Berat the inhabitants sieged the castle.

In a sign of pacification the Ottoman government evicted Emin Pasha from his post, but the rebellion continued and spread out even more. In September 1833 the castle of Berat surrendered to the rebels. The rebels requests were to have Albanian governors and officials in the rebel districts and to abolish new taxes. Alarmed, the Ottoman government accepted the rebels' requests by nominating Albanian officials in the cities of Berat, Vlorë, Tepelenë, Përmet, and Gjirokastër, and by also declaring an amnesty.

== Uprisings in 1834–1835 ==
Uprisings in 1834–1835
Location
Result
Albania, Ottoman Empire
Ottoman victory in South Albania
Albanian victory in North Albania

Belligerents
Albanian Rebels	Ottoman Empire

Commanders and leaders
Tafil Buzi; Alush bey Frakulla; Hamza Kazazi; Haxhi Idrizi	Hafiz Pasha; Vasaf Efendi

Strength
10,000	60,000

The Ottomans didn't keep their promises long in south Albania. The inhabitants of Berat rose up in rebellion and asked for the local leader Tafil Buzi to lead them. Soon they gathered an army of 10000 men. The rebellion was spread in the same regions in which the rebellion took place in the previous year. The rebels besieged the castle of Berat and in the liberated city they created a committee. The political leader was elected Abaz bey Lushnja and the military commander Tafil Buzi. They asked from the new governor of Vlora sandjak for an autonomy of their regions. After two months of siege, the castle of Berat surrendered to the rebels.

In January 1835, the rebels committee signed a document in which the Ottoman government promised to fulfill their requests while they had to depose the arms. While the agreement was quickly violated by the Ottoman government, the rebels under Tafil Buzi rose up again, this time marching to Ioannina. There, Tafil Buzi made a proclamation for all the Albanian to take their arms against the Ottomans and this was one of the first proclamations for the liberation of Albania. Tafil Buzi asked also for the help of Mehmet Ali of Egypt. Alarmed, the Ottoman government sent many military troops against the rebels. Under those circumstances, Tafil Buzi was forced to accept the amnesty and to withdraw in his village in May 1835.

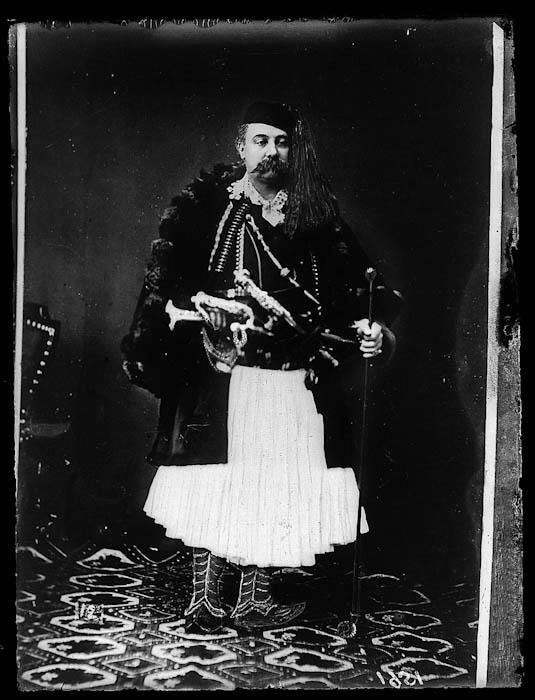
Hamza Kazazi, ca. 1858

At the same time in May 1835, in Myzeqe a new rebellion took place under the leadership of Alush bey Frakulla. The uprise was soon put to an end by Ottoman government corrupting the leaders.

While the situation was calmed down in South Albania, Hafiz Pasha the new governor of Shkodër, tried to implement new reforms in the sandjak. He raised the custom taxes and also introduced new "extraordinary taxes". This caused a new rebellion in the city of Shkodër. The rebels were led by Hamza Kazazi which was the head of city guilds. The rebels forced the Ottoman garrison to withdraw in the castle. They created a new committee led by Hamza Kazazi, Haxhi Idrizi and other local leaders, asking from the Ottoman government to respect their old privileges. While their requests were refused on 24 May 1835 they attacked the Ottoman posts. The rebels were helped from other volunteers coming from Gjakova and Peja. After the first clashes even the regions of Ulqin and Mirdita joined the rebellion. Hafiz Pasha requested help from Vladika of Montenegro to crush the rebellion promising him some lands around the lake of Shkodër, but although an agreement was done that help never came.

Unable to deal with the rebels by local Ottoman forces, the Ottoman government sent the Vali of Roumeli to crush the rebellion. On 14 July 1835, Vali's forces were crushed by the rebels in a pitch battle. A new regular army of 30000 men under the command of the secretary of Sultan, Vasaf Efendi was sent as reinforcement to Vali's troops. In the meantime Vali of Roumeli began negotiations with the rebels. The Ottoman official sent them even a false document, in which the sultan promised the acceptance of their requests. Many of the rebels convinced of the document began leaving the ranks, only a part of them under Haxhi Idrizi distrustful of Ottomans continued their resistance.

On 1 September the reinforced Ottoman army attacked the rebels in the vicinities of Lezhë. After fierce fightings the Ottoman forces were able to relieve the besieged garrison of Shkodër on 18 September. Great part of the rebels withdrew in the mountains. To calm the situation the Ottoman government transferred the Ottoman governor Hafiz Pasha and canceled the military service for the rebel regions.

== Uprisings of 1836–1839 in South Albania ==
Uprisings of 1836–1839 in South Albania
Location	South Albania, Ottoman Empire
Result	Ottoman victory in 1836; Albanian victory in 1839

Belligerents
Albanian Rebels	Ottoman Empire

Commanders and leaders
Tafil Buzi; Alush bey Frakulla	Unknown

Strength
Unknown	Unknown

In summer 1836 a new uprising began in Vlora region. The rebels were led again by Tafil Buzi but with a little success. In 1837 a new uprising began in Muzeqe under Alush bey Frakulla. They defeated the Ottoman forces in the vicinity of Berat, but in a second battle in Frakull they were defeated by a superior new Ottoman force. Alush bey Frakulla and other local leaders were captured sentenced in hard labor in Istanbul.

In August 1839 a new uprising took place in Berat. The inhabitants of Berat attacked the Ottoman forces and besieged them in the castle. The rebellion spread out in all the regions of Sanjak of Vlorë. The rebels leaders sent a petition to Sultan Abdul Medjit to have Albanian officials in administration and to put Ismail Pasha, the nephew of Ali Pasha as a general governor. In September 1839 the rebels captured the castle and once again the Ottoman government postponed the application of reforms in Albania.
