= Bërdicë e Mesme =

- Village
- Location within Albania
- Coordinates: 42°1′26″N 19°29′23″E
- Country: Albania
- County: Shkodër
- Municipality: Shkodër
- Administrative unit: Bërdicë
- Time zone: UTC+1 (CET)
  - Summer (DST): UTC+2 (CEST)

Bërdicë e Mesme is a settlement in the former Bërdicë municipality, Shkodër County, northern Albania. At the 2015 local government reform it became part of the municipality Shkodër.
