= Kuç, Vlorë =

Kuç
- Village
- Location within Albania
- Coordinates: 40°10′28″N 19°50′21″E
- Country: Albania
- County: Vlorë
- Municipality: Himarë
- Administrative unit: Horë-Vranisht
- Time zone: UTC+1 (CET)
  - Summer (DST): UTC+2 (CEST)

Kuç is a settlement in the Vlorë County, southwestern Albania. At the 2015 local government reform it became part of the municipality Himarë.

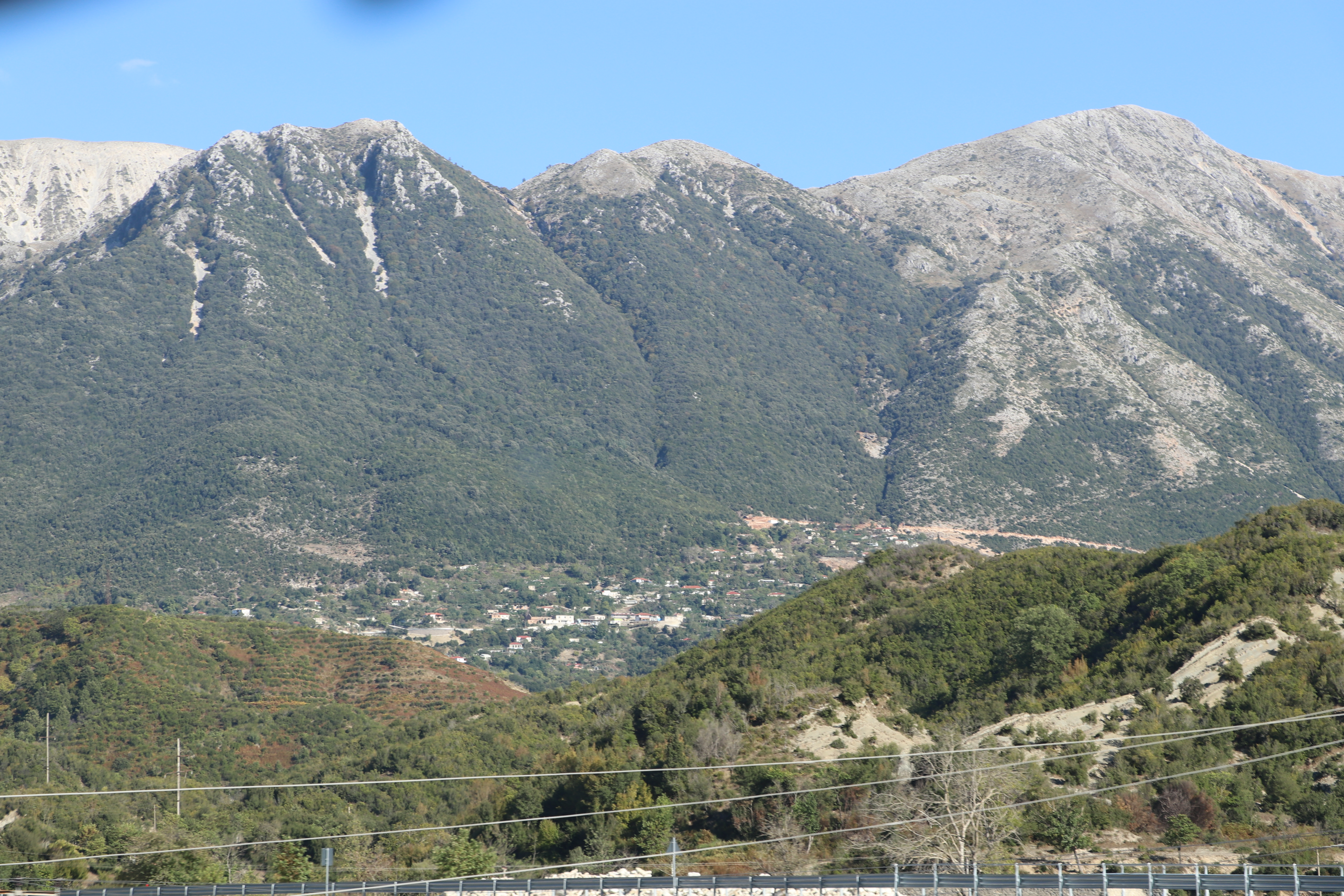
View of Kuç

== Demographics ==
Kuç is fully inhabited by Albanians who speak the Albanian dialect of Labërishte.

== History ==
In 1847 Kuç took part in a rebellion against the Ottoman Empire. Kuç and its neighboring villages, which are Albanian-speaking and nationalistic in sentiment, were burned by Greek soldiers during the Balkan War in 1912 and were at feud with the Greek speaking pocket of Himarë.

== Notable people ==
- Zenel Gjoleka, Albanian Rebel Leader and Hero.
