= Hamza bey Kazazi =

Albanian fighter and leader

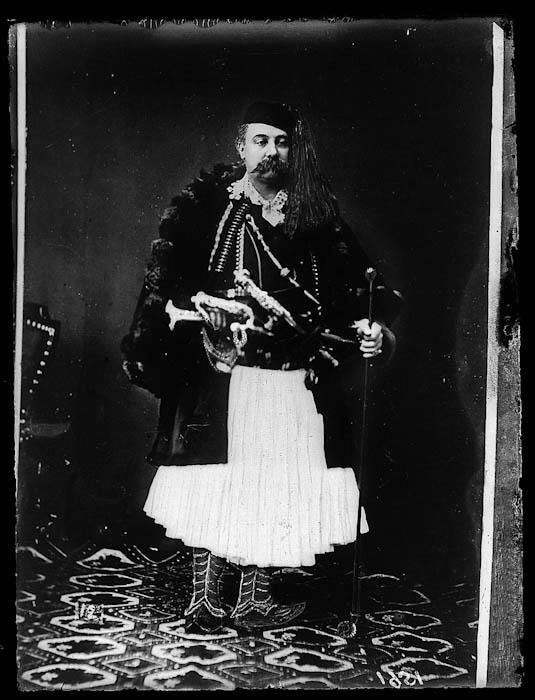
Hamza Kazazi, ca. 1858

Hamza agë Kazazi also known as Hamz Kazazi (1779–1859) was an Albanian fighter and leader, known for his role in Albanian Uprising of 1835 in Shkodër, back then the center of Pashalik of Scutari of the Ottoman Empire. He had an only son called Tahir Hamze Kazazi. He is also known as the first Albanian to be photographed by Pietro Marubi.

Kazazi was descended from a village family from Beltojë, a settlement near Shkodër, which had previously settled there. During the reign of Mustafa Pasha Bushatli he was in charge of the military unit which kept order inside the town. After the arrival of Osman Hafiz Pasha in Shkodër he resigned and opposed the newly established Ottoman administration. He served as the leader of the esnaf community together with Dasho Shkreli. When in 1835 Hafiz Pasha ordered the arrest of all opposing elements, Hamza Kazazi opened fire to the patrol that came for him which triggered the uprising. Kazazi was member of the provisory council and leader of the military activities during the Albanian Uprising of 1835 against the Ottomans. He was in charge of the uprising until 29 July 1835, when he was heavily wounded in the battle of a nearby place called "St. John's Stone" (Alb: Guri i Shëngjonit). With the oppression of the uprising he completely left the political scene and regardless of the Ottomans' attempts to reengage him, he did not accept any positions until his death in 1859.
