= Rexhin =

Village in Albania

- Village
- Interactive map of Rexhin
- Coordinates: 40°14′12″N 19°53′46″E
- Country: Albania
- County: Gjirokastër
- Municipality: Tepelenë
- Administrative unit: Kurvelesh
- Elevation: 817 m (2,680 ft)
- Demonym: Rexhiniot
- Time zone: UTC+1 (CET)
  - Summer (DST): UTC+2 (CEST)

Rexhin (also spelled Rexhini) is a village in the Kurvelesh administrative unit, part of the Tepelenë Municipality in Gjirokastër County, Albania. It is situated approximately at coordinates 40°14′12″N and 19°53′46″E, at an elevation of 817 meters (2,677 feet) above sea level. The village is located in a mountainous area, characteristic of the Kurvelesh region. According to the 2011 census, the population of the Kurvelesh administrative unit, which includes Rexhin, was 705.

== Administrative context ==
Rexhin is part of the Kurvelesh administrative unit, within the Tepelenë Municipality—established under Law No. 115/2014, which reorganized local government units across Albania. This administrative structure was implemented to improve local governance and service delivery.

== Geography ==
The village is located in a mountainous area, approximately 2.4 kilometers from the center of the village of Kurvelesh. The surrounding region is characterized by rugged terrain and natural beauty, typical of the Kurvelesh area.
