= Beltojë =

- Village
- Location within Albania
- Coordinates: 42°0′50″N 19°30′49″E
- Country: Albania
- County: Shkodër
- Municipality: Shkodër
- Administrative unit: Bërdicë
- Time zone: UTC+1 (CET)
  - Summer (DST): UTC+2 (CEST)

Beltojë is a settlement in the former Bërdicë municipality, Shkodër County, northern Albania. At the 2015 local government reform it became part of the municipality Shkodër.

== Notable people ==
- Hamza Bey Kazazi - Albanian rebel leader and Patriot of the 19th century.
