= Abdyl Dylaveri =

Albanian politician and mayor

Abdyl Dylaveri was an Albanian politician and mayor of Elbasan from 1943 through 1944.
