= Delvinë =

Delvinë Δέλβινο
- Municipality
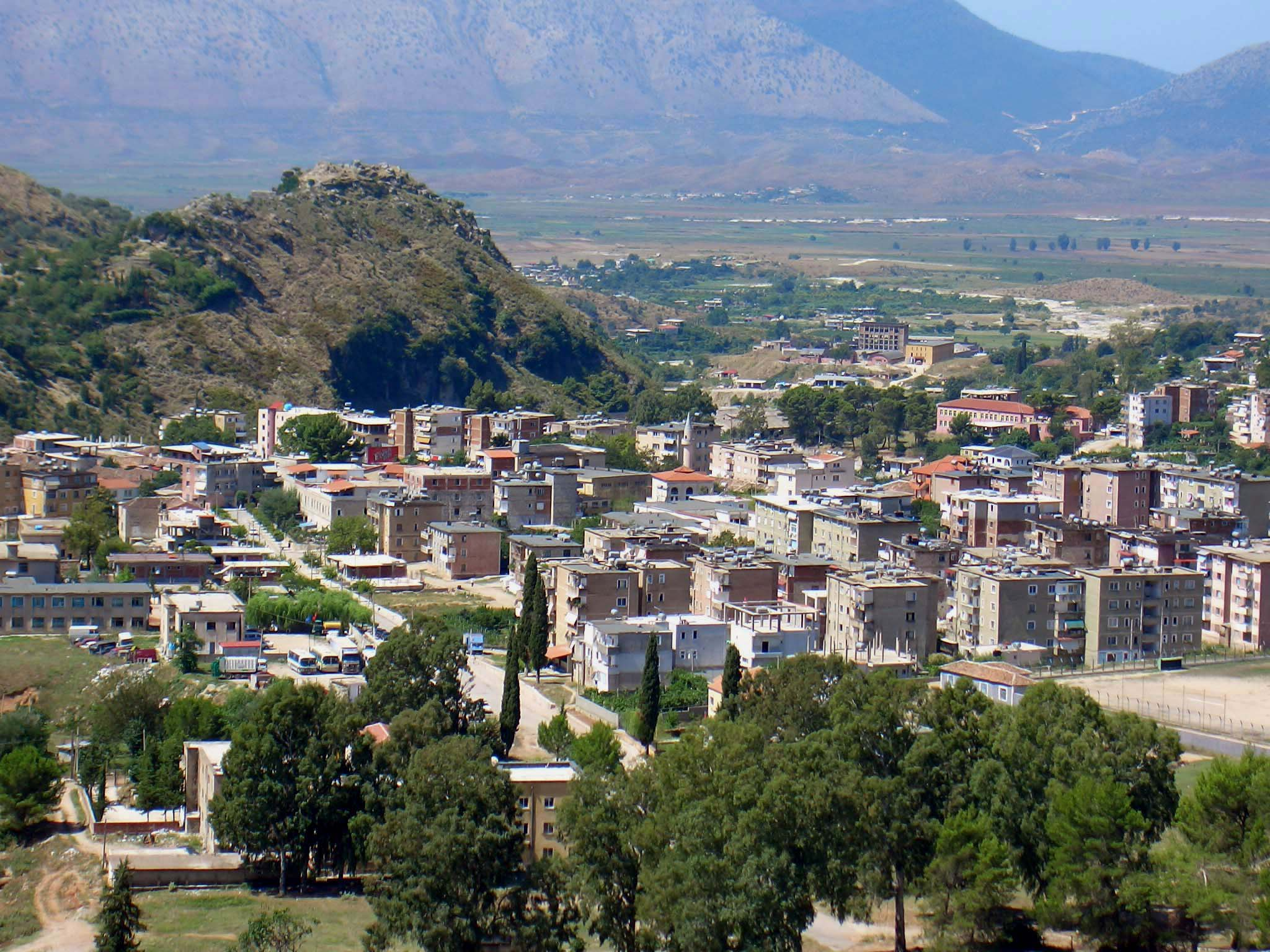

- Emblem

- Location within Albania
- Coordinates: 39°57′N 20°6′E
- Country: Albania
- County: Vlorë

Government
  - Mayor: Besmir Veli (PS)

Area
  - Municipality: 183.01 km^{2} (70.66 sq mi)
- Elevation: 207 m (679 ft)

Population (2023)
  - Municipality: 6,166
  - Municipality density: 33.69/km^{2} (87.26/sq mi)
  - Administrative unit: 4,952
- Time zone: UTC+1 (CET)
  - Summer (DST): UTC+2 (CEST)
- Postal Code: 9704
- Area Code: (0)815
- Website: www.bashkiadelvine.gov.al

Delvinë (Albanian: Delvinë or Delvina, Greek: Δέλβινο, romanized: Delvino) is a town and a municipality in Vlorë County, southern Albania, 16 kilometres (10 miles) northeast of Sarandë. It was formed in the 2015 local government reform by the merger of the former municipalities Delvinë and Vergo, which became municipal units. The seat of the municipality is the town Delvinë. The population of the municipal unit Delvinë at the 2023 census was 4,952 and of the municipality was 6,166.

The town is built on a mountain slope. It has a mosque, a Catholic church, a Protestant church, and an Orthodox church. Nearby are the remainders of a medieval castle.

The town's population consists of a majority of Albanians and a substantial Greek minority. Other communities include Balkan Egyptians and until WWII, Jews. There is little local employment apart from that provided by the state, and Delvinë benefits little from the tourist boom in Sarandë.

== Etymology ==
The Albanian toponym Delvinë (Albanian definite form: Delvina) is connected to the Albanian dele, delmë, meaning 'sheep'. Linguist Xhelal Ylli translates Delvinë as 'white sheep'. In Greek it is known as Δέλβινο, Delvino and in Turkish as Delvine.

== History ==
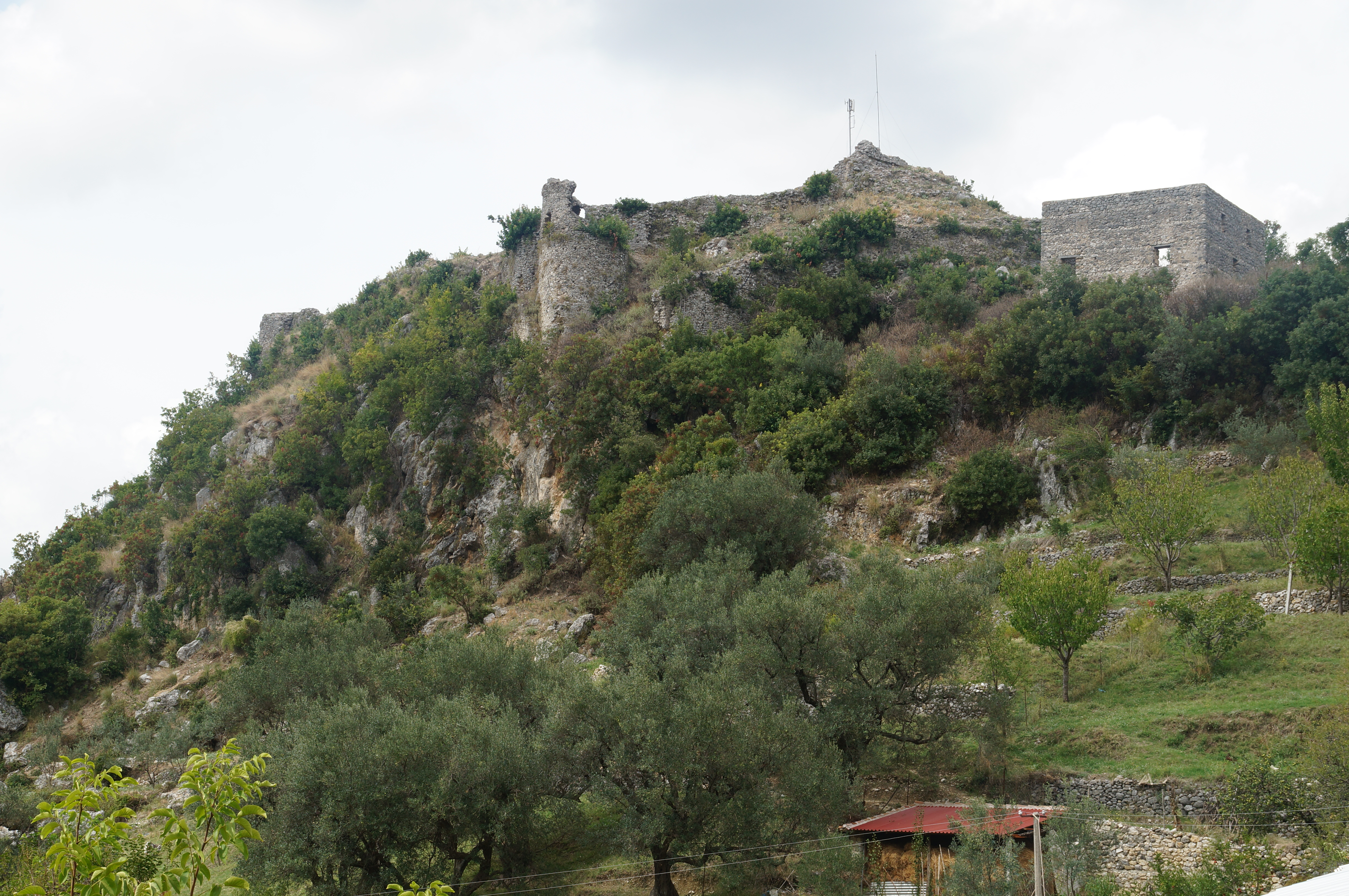
Delvinë Castle

Delvinë was ruled by the First Bulgarian Empire from the end of the 9th century to 1119, when it came under Norman control. In the 13th century, it belonged to the Despotate of Epirus. Serbian occupation followed, and in 1354 the noble Shpata family took over the town and castle. In the late 14th century and early 15th century, Delvinë was ruled by Zenebishi family, whose last Delvinë ruler was Dep Zenebishi. Evliya Çelebi claims in his writings that Delvinë was under Venetian control for some time, though this has not been proven. The Ottoman Empire temporarily took possession of the entire region in 1431 and definitively after 1492, when a garrison was placed in the castle.

=== Ottoman period ===
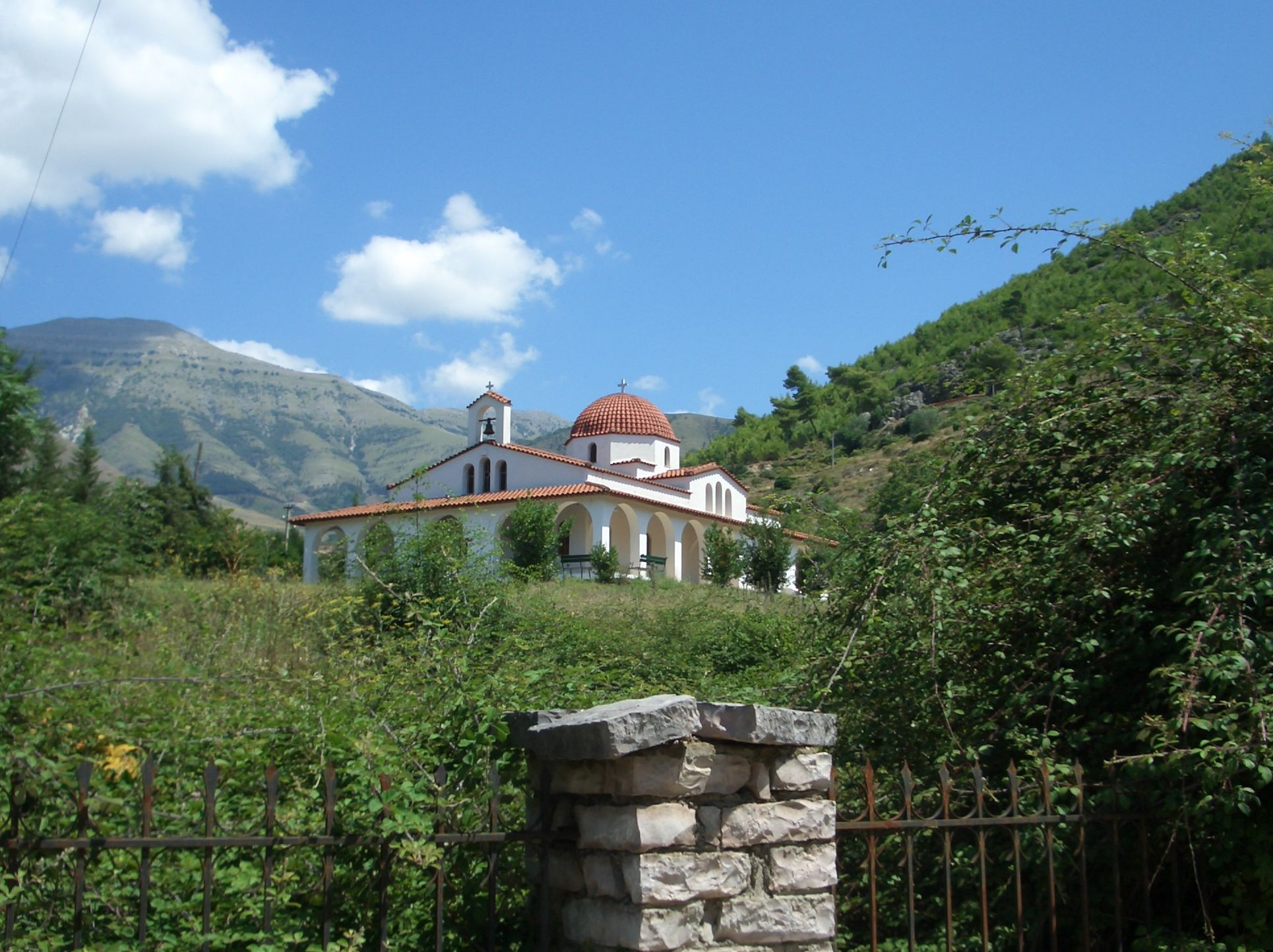
Orthodox church in Delvinë

The separate Sanjak of Delvina was established in 1537 by Ayas Mehmed Pasha, the Albanian-born vizier of Suleiman the Magnificent who pacified the area, due to the need to secure Ottoman control in the region towards potential Venetian infiltration from nearby Butrint and to control the rebellious zone of Himara. The county town was Delvinë, yet during the 18th century the local Pasha moved the seat of the sanjak from Delvinë to Gjirokastër. The official name did not change, however, as it was also referred to as the Sanjak of Gjirokastër. During the 16th-18th centuries period Delvinë underwent rapid economic and population growth, helped by the fertile lands around it and the trade route which connected the Ionian Sea with Gjirokastër and Ioannina.

In an ecclesiastical entry of 1635, the Codex of the church of Delvinë written in Greek noted that the Muslim population had increased and dwelt in quarters inhabited by Orthodox Christians, had confiscated their churches and converted them into mosques, thereby forcing the non-Islamized Christians to move to other quarters of the town. The Turkish traveller Evliya Çelebi visited Delvinë around 1670 and gave information about the city in his travel book. He reported that in the Middle Ages Delvinë was in the hands of the Spanish and later the Venetians. In his own time, Ajaz Mehmet Pasha – a native Albanian – governed the Sanjak-bey of Delvinë. The sanjak covered 24 zeamets and 155 timars. There was a Turkish garrison, whose command on the castle was from Delvinë. According to the description of Çelebi, the small fortress had a good cistern, an ammunition depot and a small mosque. In the city there were about 100 brick-built houses. These stood relatively far apart and nearly every house had a tower. He noted that a town wall was missing. There were several mosques, three medreses and about 80 stores, as well as an open marketplace. Çelebi also observed that during this time, all the inhabitants of Delvinë spoke the Albanian language while having no knowledge of the Greek language.

In an ecclesiastical entry of 1730, the Codex of the church of Delvinë noted that some of the Christian Greek clergy had linguistic difficulties in administrating their congregations, as there were Christian villagers living within the region of Delvinë who were Albanian-speaking. The local diaspora in Venice as part of the Venetian Greek community's Brotherhood of Saint Nicholas financially supported various initiatives for the expansion of Greek education in the 18th century. Thus, in two instances in 1713 and 1749, Spyros Stratis and Spyridon Rizos respectively, notable members of the local diaspora in Venice, financially supported the expansion of the local Greek education system, as well as donating vast sums of money to local Orthodox monasteries and churches. In the 18th century control over Delvina was disputed between the Koka and Delvina clans, until the town was seized by Ali Pashë Tepelena in 1784. Delvinë was taken over by Albanian rebels in 1833 causing the Ottoman government to comply to the rebel requests.

Some Ottoman inscriptions have been preserved in Delvina. They are written mainly on tombstones, and some graffiti also appear in the porch of the Gjin Aleksi Mosque. They consist of simple verses and invocations made by the pilgrims who visited this important centre. Delvina hosted dervishes of the Halveti order, which was spread towards Albania by Helvacı Yakub Efendi around 1530. In the Xhermahalle section of Delvina a Bektashi tekke can be found. Monuments like the citadel, the mosque, the Halveti tekke, the Bektashi tekke, and the hamam, indicate Delvina's great importance in the Ottoman period.

In 1847, when an Albanian revolt broke out, 500 revolutionaries led by Zenel Gjoleka took over Delvinë. In 1878 a Greek revolt broke out, with a unit of 700 revolutionaries, mostly Epirotes from the Ionian Islands, taking control of Sarandë and occupied Delvinë. However, it was suppressed by the Ottoman troops, who burned 20 villages of the region. In the same year, the local branch of the League of Prizren was founded. In 1875 a Greek female school was founded. In the late 19th century, Delvinë had reached a population of around 7,500 people, and had 400 shops and workshops. In September 1912, the Greek Band of Ioannis Poutetsis was defeated by Albanian groups and a Turkish detachment in the vicinity of Delvinë, and Poutetsis was killed.

=== Modern period ===
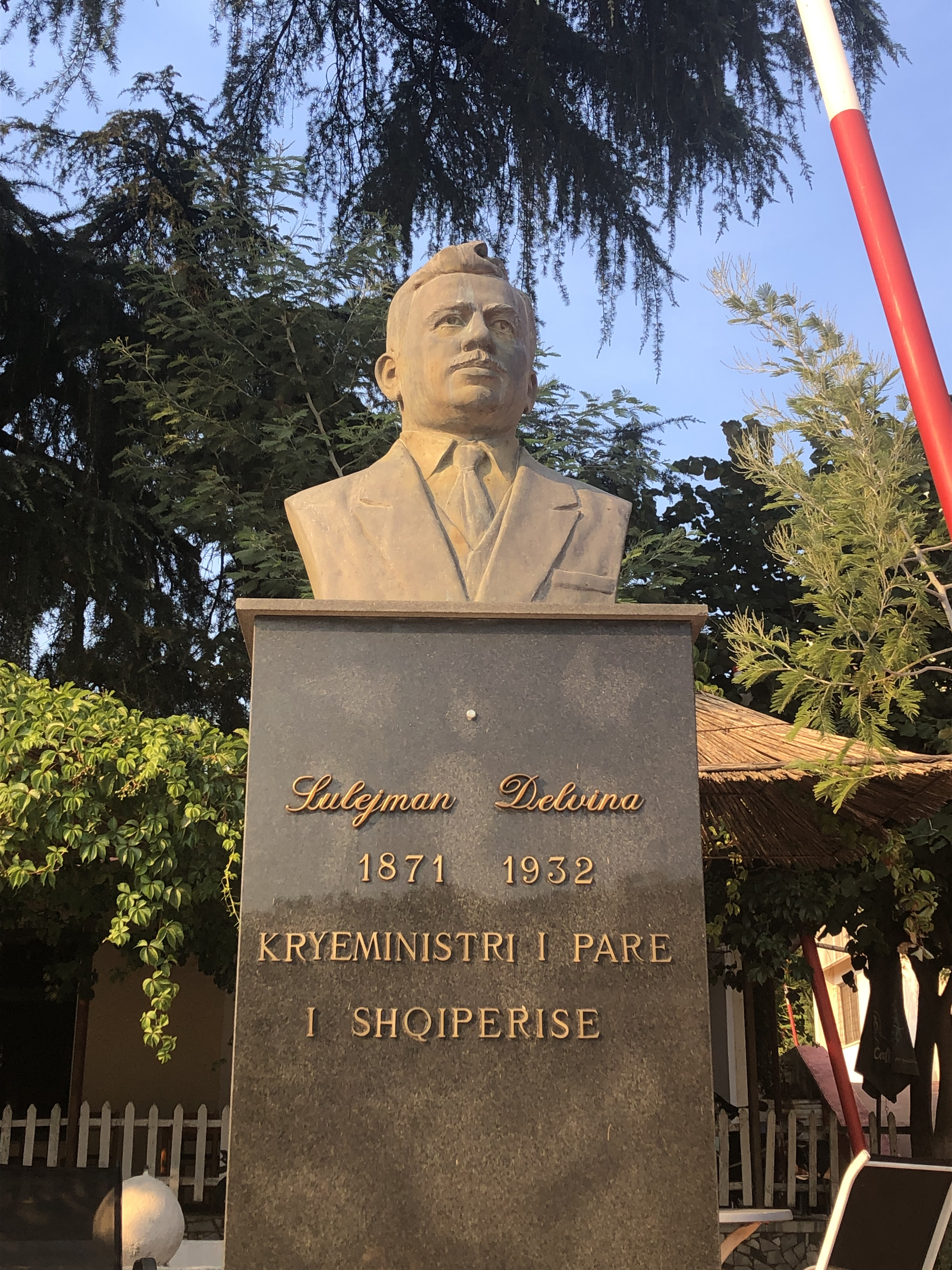
Statue of Sulejman Delvina, fifth Prime Minister of Albania

In the early 20th century a çetë (armed band) consisting of 200 activists of the Albanian National Awakening was formed in Delvinë. During the Balkan Wars and the subsequent Ottoman defeat, the Greek Army entered the city on 3 March 1913. In June 1914 the town hosted the constituent assembly of the representatives of Northern Epirus that discussed and finally approved the Protocol of Corfu, on 26 July 1914. Delvinë then became part of the short-lived Autonomous Republic of Northern Epirus. Soon after the Balkan Wars and during the World War I much of Delvinë was burned out by Greek brigands. After World War I, Greek guerrillas led by Georgios Christakis-Zografos harassed the Albanian inhabitants and destroyed a large number of Ottoman monuments. On 15 May 1937, an anti-monarchist revolt led by Ethem Toto started in Delvinë and spread in the wider region, though it was quickly crushed by the government of King Zog I. In World War II, in the initial stage of the Greco-Italian War (1940–1941) the Greek forces of the 3rd division marched Delvinë and took Sarandë in southern Albania.

The first Communist Party cell for the Sarandë District was founded in Delvinë in January 1942. After the fall of the Communist system in 1991, the town declined in both population and economic importance.

== Demography ==
In the early 19th century during the rule of Ali Pasha, British diplomat William Martin Leake arrived in town on 24 December 1804. According to him, the town had an Albanian Muslim majority who had eight or ten small mosques. The Greeks occupied the eastern suburbs called Láka and consisted of about thirty families, ten of whom had the surname Kanáki.

The town has a majority population of Albanians alongside communities of Greeks and Balkan Egyptians. According to the Human Rights Watch, Greeks constituted 50% of the town's population in 1989 (~4000 individuals), but this fell to 25% (500) in 1999. According to fieldwork by Kallivretakis (1995), the town had an Albanian majority and populations of Albanians (Muslims and Christians) and Greeks. The villages Rusan, Vllahat, Bamatata, Kopaçezë, Varfaj were inhabited by Albanians. Greeks lived in two villages of the municipality, Lefterhor and Kakodhik, while Vlachs in one village Vana.

The population of the city alone in the 2011 census was 5,754 and the total registered population of the same year was 14,218. With the administrative addition of Vergo in the municipal reform in 2015, the total resident population of Delvinë municipality was 7,598 and the total registered population was 18,074. Apart from Albanians, according to a 2014 report by the Albanian government, there were 2,300 Greeks in the number of total registered citizens in the municipality of Delvinë.

According to the 2011 census, Albanians constituted approximately 66% of the total population, Greeks constituted approximately 6% of the total population, Roma 0,25%, with the remainder not being registered. In the 2011 census, Albanian was recorded as the mother tongue of ~95% of the population, ~4% Greek, 0.02% Macedonian During the procedure organisations of the Greek minority and Albanian nationalist parties called for a boycott. Indeed, the census results were affected by boycott by a significant number of the Greek community. According to the Advisory Committee on the Framework Convention for the Protection of National Minorities, the 2011 census is unreliable, inaccurate, and incompatible with established standards for the protection of national minorities. As of 2014, there are 134 students in the municipality of Delvinë who are enrolled in Greek-language education.

Until the Second World War, a small Jewish community existed in Delvinë. It consisted of Jews from Spain who had come to Delvinë when under Ottoman rule and had close connections to the large Jewish community in Ioannina. After the war, nearly all the Jews emigrated to Israel.

== Notable people ==
- Abdyl bej Koka, Albanian bey and patriot of the mid-19th century
- Avni bej Delvina, bej of the city, one of the signatories of the Albanian Declaration of Independence
- Ayas Mehmed Pasha, 15th-century Albanian vezir of the Ottoman Empire
- Ecumenical Patriarch Serapheim II of Constantinople, Albanian cleric and Ecumenical Patriarch of Constantinople
- Hajrie Rondo, Albanian actress
- Ismail Haki Tatzati, Albanian military commander and politician who served as Minister of War
- Koço Qendro, Albanian actor
- Laert Vasili, Greek-Albanian actor and director
- Limoz Dizdari, Albanian composer
- Sabri Godo, Albanian writer and politician
- Sulejman Delvina, fifth Prime Minister of Albania
- Themistoklis Bamichas, Greek politician and representative of Northern Epirus at the Paris Peace Conference of 1919
- Xhorxhian Boçi, Albanian footballer

== See also ==
- Finiq
- Vllahat

== Bibliography ==
- Tütüncü, Mehmet (2015). Giampiero Bellingeri, Giuseppina Turano (ed.). "Corpus of Ottoman inscriptions in Southern Albania". Eurasiatica. 3. Ca' Foscari-Digital Publishing: 155–187. doi:10.14277/6969-048-8/EUR-3-11 (inactive 6 July 2025). ISBN 978-88-6969-050-1.
