= Koço Qendro =

Albanian actor (1927–2026)

- Born: 15 May 1927; Delvinë, Albania
- Died: 4 July 2026 (aged 99); Korçë, Albania
- Occupation: Actor
- Years active: 1960–2026
- Known for: Arpagone in The Miser

Koço Qendro (15 May 1927 – 4 July 2026) was an Albanian actor. He is considered to be the longest-living actor among the prominent figures of Albanian cinema and theatre, and one of the few who have remained active into their 90s.

== Early life and education ==
Qendro was born in Delvinë on 15 May 1927. He completed his seven-year education in the city of Delvina, while his secondary school was in Elbasan. At the age of 15, he became a partisan with the National Liberation War. He received the rank of officer, and for eleven years, he performed political duties in the army. In 1956, he was charged with political duties in Korçë.

== Career ==
At the beginning of 1960, Qendro was selected as one of the founding actors who created the troupe of professional Estrade of Korça. From the creation, Koço created over 20 premieres of various characters with artistic levels, performing in the short plays of the variety theater such as humorous, dialogues, monologues, parodies, pantomimes and couplets.

Throughout his career, Qendro has portrayed a wide range of characters, both on stage and beyond, earning praise from critics. Notable performances include his role as Sir Enry Egidi in Shakespeare's Twelfth Night at the "A. Z. Çajupi" Theatre of Korça, under the direction of Pirro Mani. In this production, he demonstrated his ability to portray a variety of characters, from a harmless buffoon to a brave knight, a coward, and the unfortunate lover of Olivia.

Another significant role was that of Harpagon in Molière's The Miser, directed by Dhimitër Orgocka. He performed this role twice, first in 1976 and again in 2005—nearly thirty years later—winning the "Best Actor" award at the "Apollon" festival in Fier.

Qendro also contributed significantly to the preservation of theatre history in the Korça region, working with dedication to establish the archive and museum room dedicated to local theatrical heritage.

In recognition of his contributions both during the National Liberation War and on the stage, he has been awarded six medals and three orders, including the "Red Star" and "Naim Frashëri" (Class II and Class III).

== Personal life and death ==
In a heartfelt revelation, journalist Tami Kona disclosed that he is the biological son of actor Koço Qendro. Adopted and raised by his childless maternal aunt in Tirana, Kona shared his personal journey of discovering his parentage during an emotional interview on DritareTV's "Dekalog" program. He recounted his experiences of spending summers in Korçë and the moment he learned about his true lineage, which he had long suspected. Kona's story adds a poignant chapter to Qendro's legacy, intertwining the realms of Albanian theater and journalism.

Qendro died in his hometown of Korçë, on 4 July 2026, at the age of 99. He was the oldest living Albanian actor and one of the last surviving stars from the Golden Age of Classic Albania cinema still active.

== Filmography ==
- Within Love (2024) – Gjyshi
- Tre ditë nga një jetë (1986) – Kryeplaku i fshatit
- Vendimi (1984) – Aleks Xinxa
- Agimet e stinës së madhe (1981) – Aleks Lili
- Përballimi (1976) – Sefedini
- I teti ne bronz (1970) – Ballisti
