= Vangjel Koça =

Albanian journalist

Vangjel Koça (1900–1943) journalist, an Albanian ideologue of fascism,Robert Elsie (19 March 2010). Historical Dictionary of Albania. Scarecrow Press. p. 231. ISBN 978-0-8108-7380-3.Mehmet Beqiraj; Free Europe Committee. Mid-European Studies Center (1956). Albania. Mid-European Studies Center of the Free Europe Committee. translator, publisher in the interwar period, better known with his nom de plume Vangjo Nirvana. Along with Ismet Toto, Branko Merxhani, Nebil Çika etc., he was one of the main representatives of the Neo-Albanianism (neo-shqiptarizma) school of thought in the 1930s. His political thought emphasized national regeneration, social modernization and the transformation of Albanian society, developing during the late 1930s toward fascism, corporatism and elements associated with national syndicalism, particularly the integration of occupational and social interests into a unified national political framework.

He was born in Gjirokastër. He was a translator of Epictetus, Lucian and Descartes, and wrote articles under the playful pen name Vangjo Nirvana. His ideas concerning national renewal, modernization and the overcoming of traditional social divisions shared certain features with the broader revolutionary and modernist currents of interwar Fascism and Futurism. Following the Italian invasion of Albania, Vangjel Koça became a leader of the Fascist Party after Albania’s invasion in 1939 and participated in the corporatist institutions established under the fascist regime."Këshilli i Epërm Korporativ Fashist, 3 prill 1940". His involvement in these institutions reflected the regime’s attempt to organize economic and occupational groups through state-supervised corporations, while his emphasis on national regeneration and social reorganization contained elements comparable to the national-syndicalist currents found elsewhere in interwar Europe.

He drowned in the Adriatic Sea, while trying to escape to Italy, in August 1943.
