= Alush bey Frakulla =

Alush bey Frakulla was an Albanian leader, known for his role in the uprisings of 1835 and 1837. During the latter, he was captured together with 150 of his men and was punished with hard labor in Ottoman prisons, where he died in unknown date.
