= Çelo Picari =

Albanian rebel

- Born: 1801; Picar, Albania (then Ottoman Empire)
- Died: 1880 (aged 78–79); Athens, Greece
- Occupation: Aga
- Known for: one of the main leaders of the Albanian Revolt of 1847

Xhelil Bega or Çelo Picari (1801–1880) was an Albanian revolutionary leader of the Albanian Revolt of 1847.

== Life ==
Born Xhelil Bega in 1801 in the old Picar, a settlement that is no longer inhabited and in ruins, but close to today's Picar, in southern Albania, he later preferred to be called Çelo Picari. In his youth he was a shepherd and at that time he was recruited by Ali Pasha in Ioannina. In 1821 he commanded the troops of the Pashalik of Yannina that were defending Tepelenë against the Ottoman army and Souliotes. After Ali Pasha's defeat he was interned in Preveza.

He later participated in several uprisings with Zylyftar Poda but avoided getting killed in the Massacre of the Albanian beys by not responding to an invitation. As an act of revenge along with other groups under Kapllan Kuca he burnt part of center of Ioannina, where the Ottoman garrison lived. As a result of his participation in the Albanian Revolts of 1833–1839 he was imprisoned in Konya until 1844.

Picari participated in the Albanian Revolt of 1847 along with Tafil Buzi and Zenel Gjoleka and his name is among the names of the Albanians who asked Otto of Greece for help in their uprising against the Ottoman Empire. When Picari was captured he was again interned in Konya until 1852. Picari died in Athens, Greece in 1880. Picari was close friends with Ismail Vlora, the grandfather of Ismail Qemali, the founder of modern Albania.

== Folklore ==
Çelo Picari is a frequent subject of southern Albanian folk songs regarding Ali Pasha and the Albanian Revolt of 1847. These songs include among other lyrics that compare him to the Souliot Markos Botsaris.

Albanian

Marko Boçari suliot,
Qan e të këput me lot,
Se me Çelon se del dot,
Është djalë picariot

English

The Souliot Mark Botsaris,
Cries and can't stop,
'Cause he can't be better than Çelo,
He is a Picariot boy
