= Muranë =

The muranë (Albanian definite form: murana) is a burial mound of stones traditionally built by Albanians with the function of preserving ancestor's memory and monumentalizing death. In Albanian paganism the muranas are associated with the stone cult, ancestor worship, and hero's cult. They are regulated by the Kanun, the Albanian traditional customary law that has directed all the aspects of the Albanian tribal society.

== History ==
The muranë are considered distant descendants of Albania's prehistoric tumuli, indeed both of them functioned as mounds of memory and served to monumentalize death. The Albanian oral landscape and memory systems were powered by stones and bones, honor and blood, with regulation through the Kanun, a customary law orally transmitted through generations by the Albanian elders.

Traditional memory systems have survived intact into modern times in Albania, a phenomenon that is explained by the lack of state formation among Albanians and their ancestors – the Illyrians, being able to preserve their "tribally" organized society. This distinguished them from civilizations such as Ancient Egypt, Minoans and Mycenaeans, who underwent state formation.

== Bibliography ==
- Galaty, Michael L. (2018). Memory and Nation Building: From Ancient Times to the Islamic State. Rowman & Littlefield. ISBN 9780759122628.
- Sokoli, Ramadan (2013) [1999]. "The Albanian World in the Folk Teller's Stories". In Margaret Read MacDonald (ed.). Traditional Storytelling Today: An International Sourcebook. Translated by Pranvera Xhelo. Routledge. ISBN 9781135917142.
- Tirta, Mark (2004). Petrit Bezhani (ed.). Mitologjia ndër shqiptarë (in Albanian). Tirana: Mësonjëtorja. ISBN 99927-938-9-9.
