= Kurvelesh, Tepelenë =

Kurvelesh
- Administrative unit
- Location within Albania
- Coordinates: 40°14′N 19°54′E
- Country: Albania
- County: Gjirokastër
- Municipality: Tepelenë

Population (2011)
  - Administrative unit: 705
- Time zone: UTC+1 (CET)
  - Summer (DST): UTC+2 (CEST)

Kurvelesh is a former municipality in the Gjirokastër County, southern Albania. At the 2015 local government reform it became a subdivision of the municipality Tepelenë. The population at the 2011 census was 705. The municipal unit consists of the villages Progonat, Lekdush, Gusmar, Nivicë and Rexhin.

== History ==
=== Ottoman ===
In the early 20th century a çetë (armed band) consisting of 200 activists of the Albanian National Awakening was formed in Kurvelesh.

== Notable people ==
- Hodo Nivica (1809-1852), leader of the Albanian Revolt of 1847.
- Sali Nivica (1890-1920), Albanian publicist and patriot
