= Hodo Nivica =

Albanian activist

Hodo Nivica (1809–1852) was an Albanian activist leader known for his role in Albanian revolt of 1847. He was one of the few local leaders that escaped the massacre of Albanian beys. Although invited by Ottoman governor, suspicious of his real intentions he did not go to Monastir. After his participation in the revolt of 1847 he was pardoned by the Sultan. In 1852, together with Zenel Gjoleka he died fighting as a mercenary against Montenegrin forces. His grave is located in the Shpuza, Montenegro.

== Sources ==
- Pollo, Stefanaq (1984), Historia e Shqipërisë: Vitet 30 të shek. XIX-1912 (in Albanian), Akademia e Shkencave e RPS të Shqipërisë, Instituti i Historisë, OCLC 165705732
