= Ikbal Çika =

Albanian woman journalist (d. 1956)

Ikbal Çika (died 1956) was an Albanian journalist and campaigner for women's rights. She is largely considered as Albania's first woman journalist.

== Life and work ==
She came from an intellectual family. Born in the early 1900s she was the sister of the translator and philosopher Nebil Çika.

In the years 1925-1926 she worked as a primary school teacher. In 1926 she started working for the newspaper Demokraci, in which she authored a column dedicated to women's emancipation. Later she became the editor-in-chief of the newspaper Arbëria and owner and publisher of the newspapers Java, Shpresa Kombëtar, Ylli i Mëngjesit and Gruaja Shqiptare.

In the mid-1930s, she led efforts against face veiling, through her journalistic work and articles in the magazine Java, calling for drafting a law that would force women and girls to remove their face veils. This issue became so public that it took the form of a reform movement, which culminated in the passage of the law in 1937.
