= Horë-Vranisht =

- Administrative unit
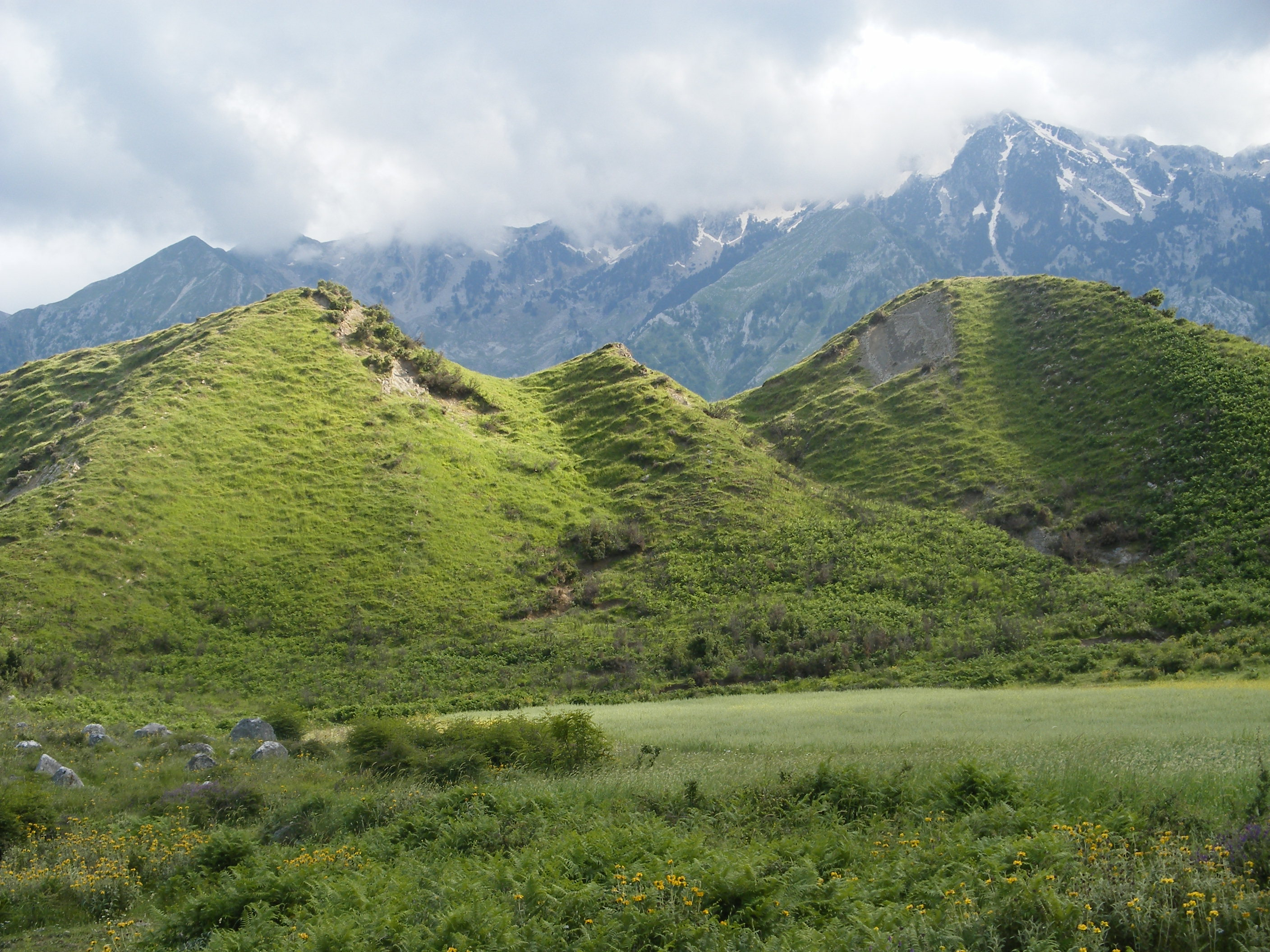
- Hills in the area

- Location within Albania
- Coordinates: 40°13′N 19°41′E
- Country: Albania
- County: Vlorë
- Municipality: Himarë

Population (2011)
  - Administrative unit: 2,080
- Time zone: UTC+1 (CET)
  - Summer (DST): UTC+2 (CEST)

Horë-Vranisht is a village and a former municipality in the Vlorë County, southwestern Albania. At the 2015 local government reform it became a subdivision of the municipality Himarë. The population at the 2011 census was 2,080. The municipal unit consists of the villages Vranisht, Kuç, Bolenë, Kallarat and Tërbaç.

== Name ==
The village was documented for the first time as Vranisht in 1274, as one of the dominions of the Kingdom of Albania. It is mentioned in the Ottoman documents of 1431-32 as Ivraniste, and with the actual form Vranisht in 1759. It was later known as Korvaleş and was the nahiya centre in the Korvaleş kaza (Its centre was Koç) in Ergiri sanjak of Yanya Vilayet before 1912).

== World War II ==
During World War II Vranisht was part of the battlefield of the Battle of Gjorm, where Albanian resistance units defeated and routed the troops of the Kingdom of Italy.

== Demographics ==
According to the Ottoman defter of the 1430s there were sixteen houses at Vranisht at that time. In the 19th century the population had grown to 350 houses and 1600 people living in Vranisht. During the 1990s the population of Vranisht was lowered due to emigration.

During the Late Middle Ages local names of the Albanians of Vranisht have been documented. The most common names documented are: Dedëgjoni, Dedëgjini, Nikhila, Lëmpali, Gjinkolli, Gjelkuca, Gjinstrati, Gjondreu, Gjikëbitri, Gjonezhi and Gjingjoni.

== Notable people ==
- Gjon Kondi
- Beqir Mete Shkurtaj
- Sali Murat Hasanaj (Vranishti)
- Sali Hallkokondi
- Hysen Çino
- Mumin Selami (Kallarat)
- Meçan Qejvani (Kallarat)
- Zejnel Çelo Shakohoxhaj
- Xhemil Veli Duka
- Vasfi Duka
- Teki Azbi Tartari
