= Massacre of the Albanian Beys =

1830 massacre in Manastir, Ottoman Macedonia

Massacre of the Albanian beys
- Location: Manastir, Ottoman Empire
- Date: 1830
- Target: Albanian beys
- Attack type: Mass murder
- Deaths: 500 Albanian beys
- Perpetrator: Ottoman forces

On 9 or 26 August 1830, 500 Albanian leaders (beys) were killed by Ottoman forces in the town of Manastir (present-day Bitola, North Macedonia). The massacre led to the weakening of the power of the beys of southern Albania and also set the basis for the destruction of the powerful northern Albanian Pashalik of Scutari.

== Background events ==
During the era of the Albanian Pashaliks, the influence of the local Albanian beys had weakened since they had lost the Pashalik of Yanina. In the late 1820s after the Greek War of Independence the Albanian mercenaries, who were employed by the Ottomans during the struggles, pillaged a large number of villages, while the bey families tried to restore and regain their rule. Their efforts included the organization of the assembly of Berat in December 1828, led by Ismail bey Qemali of the Vlora family, grandfather of Ismail Qemali, founder of the modern Albanian state in 1912. In this Convention, the leaders were Qemali, Zylyftar Poda and Shahin bej Delvina. The Ottoman Empire tried to prevent the rise of local beys, which presented a menace to centralized power. The bey also resented the modernization programs implemented during the reign of Mahmud II. These reforms were a direct threat to the arbitrary power of the Balkan Muslim aristocracy, who had grown powerful during the long decline of Ottoman power. On 5 January 1829, only one month after the Convention of Berat, its leader, Ismail bey Qemali, was killed in Yanina by people of Reşid Mehmed Pasha, which caused an upheaval in Southern Albania: in Yanina, Zagoria, Konitsa and Metsovo the Ottoman functionaries were asked to leave by the local population. The Sultan was forced to remove Reşid Mehmed Pasha and to nominate him Grand Vizier on 6 February 1829. In 1830, the Sublime Porte sent an expeditionary force under the command of Reşid Mehmed Pasha to suppress the local Albanian beys. On hearing the news of the Ottoman forces' arrival, the three most powerful local chiefs, Zylyftar Poda, accompanied by the remains of Ali Pasha's faction, Veli Bey (whose power base was around Yannina), and Arslan Bey, along with other less powerful beys, began to prepare their forces to resist a probable Ottoman attack.

== Massacre ==
Realising the seriousness of the situation and the danger of a general uprising, Reşid Mehmed Pasha invited the Albanian beys to a meeting on the pretext that they would be rewarded for their loyalty to the Porte. Two of the main leaders, Veli and Arslan Bey, accepted the invitation and went together with their followers on 9 or 26 August 1830 to meet with Reşid Mehmed Pasha at his headquarters in Manastir. On their arrival there, the commander led them into an enclosed field when they saw armed forces aligned in ceremonial salute parade. In fact, this was an ambush, and the soldiers opened fire on the Albanian beys. All the Albanians who had entered the field, some four to five hundred, were killed, while Arslan tried in vain to escape. He was killed by Ottoman forces after a short pursuit.

== Aftermath ==
The heads of the victims were exhibited in Constantinople. Two days after the massacre, Emin Bey, who was the son of the Vizier, ambushed and killed Veli's brother inside the fortress of Yanina. Arslan's brother Ragib, who was in Yanina, declined Emin's invitation and thus avoided being killed. The massacre of the Albanian beys was a strong blow to the beys' power in Albania. In addition, the Ottomans, after having managed to deprive southern Albania from its leaders, defeated the following year, in 1831, the Pashalik of Scutari, the last remaining Albanian pashalik giving signals of separatism. Albanians would lose track with that particular period which led to the creation of new neighboring Balkan states. The population was not allowed to carry arms anymore, even the Muslims. The ruling cast throughout the Albanian Vilayets would be substituted with a more fanatic leadership, which would have a strong negative impact during the Albanian National Awakening later. Albanian credibility within the Empire would never recover completely. Nevertheless, this did not end the opposition of the Albanians to the Ottoman regime, which re-emerged with the revolts of 1833-9 and 1847.

== In literature ==
The massacre is the main theme of the novel Komisioni i festës (English: "The Celebration Commission") by Albanian writer Ismail Kadare. In Kadare's vision, this battle is the battle of two empires: the Albanian Kanun with its code of besa ("honor"), against the Ottoman Empire itself.

== Sources ==
- Vickers, Miranda (1999). The Albanians: A Modern History. I.B. Tauris. ISBN 1-86064-541-0.
- Gounaris, Basil (2018). "Blood Brothers in Despair: Greek Brigands, Albanian Rebels and the Greek-Ottoman Frontier, 1829‑1831". Cahiers Balkaniques. doi:10.4000/ceb.11433.
- Tozer, Henry Fanshawe (1869). Researches in the Highlands of Turkey Including Visits to Mounts Ida Athos Olympus and Pelion. John Murray.
- Colafato, Michele (1998). Emozioni e confini: per una sociologia delle relazioni etniche. Meltemi Editore srl. ISBN 88-86479-69-7.
- Skendi, Stavro (1967). The Albanian National Awakening, 1878-1912. Princeton University Press. ISBN 9780691650029.
