= Albanian revolt of 1847 =

1847 Albanian rebellion against the Ottoman Empire

Date	June − December 1847
Location	Sanjak of Avlona, Sanjak of Delvina and Sanjak of Ioannina
Result	Ottoman victory

Belligerents
Ottoman Empire; Sanjak of Avlona; Sanjak of Delvina; Sanjak of Ioannina; Sanjak of Tirhala; Sanjak of Monastir; Sanjak of Ohrid	Albanian National League; Lab Albanians; Mallakastriot Albanians; Tosk Albanians; Çam Albanians

Commanders and leaders
Omer Vrioni; Isuf Pasha Vrioni †; Ferid Vrioni †; Ismail Pasha (WIA); Shahin Kosturi Pasha; Mehmed Reshid Pasha; Hasan Pasha †	Çelo Picari; Zenel Gjoleka; Hodo Nivica; Rrapo Hekali (POW); Ahmed Dino; Peti Mitko

Casualties and losses
Unknown	Unknown
- 25,000 − 50,000 killed

The Albanian revolt of 1847 was a 19th-century uprising in southern Albania directed against Ottoman Tanzimat reforms which started in 1839 and were gradually being put in action in the regions of Albania.

== Background ==
The primary aim of the Tanzimat reforms was that of creating a strong modern local apparatus with which to govern the empire. The old privileges were abolished and taxes were to be collected from Ottoman officials, rather than by local Albanian beys.

After the Uprising of Dervish Cara in 1844, the Ottoman Porte declared the application of the Tanzimat reforms in southern Albania. Albanian sanjaks were reorganized. In Southern Albania, the Sublime Porte proclaimed the tanzimat reforms in 1846, at a ceremony organized in Janina. But for years the country was feeling the devastating consequences of military expeditions of the Ottomans. In the newly formed Sanjak of Berat, which included the provinces of Vlora, Mallakastra, Skrapar and Përmet, Hysen Pasha Vrioni was assigned with the duty of Sanjakbey. Major military forces, some of which were commanded by Vrioni, began to disarm the populace extort taxes. Demir aga Vlonjati, a religious poet of the time, tells that as "soon as the Turkish expeditions approached, all the people would flee from their home as if there was a ring of plague." The violent implementation of the reforms, though at first only in some provinces, increased the dissatisfaction of the Albanians towards the Ottoman rulers and became ready for another revolt. Sensing the danger, the Ottoman government, invited the heads of Toskëria to Bitola to convince them to accept the Tanzimat. The same occurred in Janina with about 800 agas and local brigands as well as representatives of the towns and religious institutions.

== Revolt ==
Albanian peasants, mostly from southern Albania, reacted to the actions of Ottoman administration and in June 1847, their representatives met in Mesaplik. The meeting, known as "Assembly of Mesaplik" (Albanian:Kuvendim i Mesaplikut), opposed the centralist Tanzimat reforms. In a memorandum sent to the Turkish sultan the participants declared that they would not send soldiers in the regular army, would not pay the new taxes and would also not accept the new administration. The Assembly highlighted that the Albanian people, Muslim and Christian, are one and undivided, calling on all, without exception, to go to war against Ottoman rulers and demand that life, honor and wealth of all Albanians be guaranteed regardless of religion. On these grounds was formed the Albanian National League. The League created a committee with Zenel Gjoleka as its leader. The goal of the committee was to better organize political and military activities of Albanian resistance. When the new Ottoman administration tried to gather the new taxes in Kuç, the peasants went into open rebellion in July 1847. 500 men led by Zenel Gjoleka marched toward Delvinë and liberated the city. In a short period of time the uprising expanded in all Vlorë region, Chameria, Përmet and especially in Mallakastër where the local rebels were led by another notable local leader, Rrapo Hekali.

Isuf bey Vrioni with its men attacked the rebels in the Mallakastër area. The Ottoman forces were defeated, with Isuf and his brother being captured during the fighting and executed by the rebels. After that, Rrapo Hekali and the Mallakastriot rebels attacked Berat, but having no artillery they could not capture the castle. They continued the siege without attacking the castle. At the same time, the rebels led by Gjoleka and Çelo Picari defeated an Ottoman force coming from Ioannina. The Gjoleka men also attacked Gjirokastër and kept its castle under siege. The Porte was alarmed by the news and a relief force of 3000 men under Shahin bey Kosturi was sent from Thessaly against the rebels in Gjirokastër, but Kosturi and his Ottoman force were also defeated by the forces of Gjoleka. Gjoleka also tried to cooperate with the Greeks, and negotiated with the Greek government of Ioannis Kolettis, but with little success. Contacts with Kolettis seem to have continued, since Gjoleka has received a large scale participation by Christian chieftains, Albanians and Greeks, in his movement. A new Ottoman army of 5000 men was sent from Ioannina against Gjoleka. With a force of 1500 men Gjoleka was able to defeat again the Ottoman army yet again in the Battle of Dholan on 28 August 1847.

At the same time some 15,000 Ottoman forces under the Turkish marshal Mehmet Reshit Pasha were sent from Manastir to relieve the siege of Berat. In Ohrid an Ottoman force of 6,000 men was summoned. The Ottoman forces attacked the forces of Rrapo Hekali based in the city of Berat and at the same time the Turkish garrison in the castle attacked them from behind. Albanian forces left the siege and withdrew in Mallakastër. From Berat, the Ottoman army tried to enter the heart of the rebellion in the Kurvelesh region, from the Kuç pass where Gjoleka forces were concentrated. They once again resisted the Ottoman forces. At the same time other Ottoman forces attacked Kurvelesh from the Mesaplik region and another Ottoman column disembarked in the Himara region, encircling the forces of Gjoleka. Even under these circumstances Gjoleka's men resisted. Seeing the tough resistance, Mehmed Reshid Pasha declared an amnesty and invited all the leaders to meet him in Zhulat village. Some 85 men who believed his words went to the place of meeting (among whom were the local leader Hodo Nivica and some other minor leaders) and were captured. After that the organised resistance was no longer possible and Albanian forces were divided in small ceta. Ottoman forces entered the regions of uprising and thousands of men were arrested and deported, whereas Rrapo Hekali was sent to a prison in Manastir, where he was poisoned on December 30, 1847. Gjoleka with a small group of fighters retreated to Greece, which ended the uprising.

Both Albanian and Greek inhabited villages in the region suffered when the uprising was suppressed the following autumn by the Ottoman forces.
