= Nebil Çika =

Albanian philosopher and journalist (1893-1944)

Nebil Çika (1893 – 12 November 1944) was a renowned Albanian philosopher and translator, one of the first Albanian journalists and a publicist. He was executed by the communist forces that had just established their power in Albania, becoming one of the prominent intellectual victims of the political purges that marked the communist takeover of Albania.

== Biography ==
Çika was born in Preveza in 1893. He became one of the most active journalists of the time with different publications for national and international media, including the Albanian magazine Minerva, as well as Reuters and The New York Times. In the Ottoman Empire he was known as Ahmed Nebil.

Çika is largely considered as one of the founders of modern Albanian professional journalism. Together with his sister Ikbal Çika he dedicated many years of his life to the improvement of the population's literacy, mass education and culture promotion.

He was one of the first intellectuals to be prosecuted and killed extrajudicially by Communist and partisan forces in 1944. Çika and his brother-in-law Aleks Mavraqi were seized and shot on the very eve of the liberation of Tirana.

In 2009, he was decorated by the President of Albania with the Honour of the Nation Decoration, together with 36 other intellectuals killed in 1944.
