= Zenel Gjoleka =

Albanian revolutionary

Zenel Gjoleka (1805–1852) was an Albanian revolutionary fighter born in Kuç of Kurvelesh who participated in rebellions against the Ottoman Empire central authority, being against reforms of Tanzimat (that decreased the power of the local Albanian Pashas and Beys).

== Biography ==
=== Early life ===
Zenel Gjoleka also known as Zenel Gjonleka was born in 1805 in the village of Kuç situated in the heartland of Kurvelesh to a family of carpenters the son of Hito Gjoleka and Sabo Qorduka Gjoleka. His father Hito died when he was only 6 months old so he was raised in a tough childhood which shaped his life by his mother and his relative Mehmet Qorri.

=== Soldier ===
Gjoleka was taken by Ismail Bej Vlora in 1823–1824 to serve as a soldier in his garrison in Vlorë where he won his trust and became one of Ismail's most trustable soldiers. On entering the new year of 1829 Ismail was called by the Ottoman authorities in Janina and was treacherously assassinated inside the castle of Janina by the Ottoman soldiers on 5 January 1829, this caused a turmoil between his 600 soldiers and the Ottoman garrison which Gjoleka used in his advantage to singlehandedly storm the castle and assassinate Reshid Pasha of Janina thus taking revenge for his master. He swiftly escaped from Janina and went to the mountains where he joined the rebel groups led by Tafil Buzi.

=== Rebel ===
He participated in the Albanian Revolts of 1833-1839 where he became well known for his bravery during battles accompanying Tafil Buzi in the battles of Tepelena and Luzat. He along with Buzi captured the Aghas of Berat and in Grepene assassinated Veli Agha. In March 1834 Gjoleka and Buzi signed an agreement with the Greek government that they were the Ottoman troops in Janina from 2 directions, Gjoleka and Buzi landed on Dukat and marched with their troops against Janina but the Greek government had led them on suicide mission due to the Greek troops not showing up. After Buzi was captured in 1840 and was imprisoned in Anatolia by the Ottomans Gjoleka yet again lived in the mountains and from time to time attacked the Ottoman haraçtakers but was eventually captured and deported for a short time before returning in Albania yet again.

=== The uprising of 1847 ===
The primary aim of the Tanzimat reforms was that of creating a strong modern local apparatus with which to govern the empire. The old privileges were abolished and taxes were to be collected from Ottoman officials, rather than by local Albanian beys. The Albanian sanjaks were all re-organized, and the newer sanjakbeys were cruel to the local Albanian population which gave rise to a massive unpopularity of the reforms across the Vilayets as described by Demir Vlonjati "as soon the Turkish troops approach entire villages empty as if a plague has ringed on the door". The violent implementation of the reforms in Albanian lands caused massive dissatisfaction and in June 1847 Albanian peasants, kryeplaks previous rebel leaders and war veterans meet up in Mesaplik. The meeting which became known as "The assembly of Mesaplik (Albanian: Kuvendi i Mesaplkiut) opposed the Tanzimat reforms and during the assembly it was declared that no more soldiers would be sent to the regular army and no more taxes would be paid to the Sanjakbeys further highlighting that Albanians Christian or Muslim were all brothers of one blood regardless reglion and wealth and called for all without expection to go to war against the Ottomans thus creating the Albanian National League due to which Gjoleka well known for his bravery and knowledge was chosen as the main leader. When the Ottoman troops came in Kuç to take the taxes Gjoleka and the locals attacked them and sent them to Delvina to spread the message that "Albania belongs to its rightful owners and not the Sultan of Istanbul" shortly afterwards Gjoleka with a group of 300-500 men attacked Delvina defeating the Ottomans and expelling them thus bringing the first town under Albanian control and giving the first win to the rebels. Shortly after Gjoleka together with Çelo Picari led the Albanian rebels towards Gjirokastër where they took over the city and sieged the castle and with the help of the Albanian inhabitants repulsed 2 Ottoman counter assaults from Janina and Thessaly led by Shahin Bej Kosturi and Ismail Pasha killing in the process 2 of Shahin's the most trustable men Hasan Bej and Tahsin Efendi and wounding Ismail himself. Gjoleka tried to cooperate with the Greek government but due to Greek claims over Southern Albania and Çamëria the ties fell apart as Gjoleka harshly rejected any Greek rule over Albanian lands. Gjoleka together with 1.500 men entered the area around Janina defeating a 5.000 strong Ottoman army very near the city itself. Due to fear of the rebellion spilling over to other Vilayets and even to Greece the Ottoman government formed a 21.000 strong army which defeated the rebels of Rrapo Hekali in Berat and quickly the other rebel groups committing many atrocities against the Albanian population in the process, Gjoleka himself was forced to retreat in Kurvelesh where he stood still and repulsed the Ottomans each time they attacked till Hodo Nivica along with 85 men were captured by the Ottomans in Zhulat and the uprising fell apart.

=== Deportation ===
He along with a group of other rebels refused to surrender to the Ottomans even due to the offers of wealth and pardoning by the government, after spending the harsh winter of 1847 in a cave near Kuç which became known as "Shpella e Gjolekës" even though they were supplied with food by the local population they retreated towards the Greek-Ottoman border in Trikala in order to avoid being traced by the Ottomans thing which could lead to a massacre of the locals. The çeta held on against the Ottomans but were captured in 1848 due to the betrayal of a Greek soldier and were deportated to Anatolia while Gjoleka himself was heavily wounded.

In 1849 Gjoleka was pardoned by the Sultan during the general amnesty.

=== Later years and death ===
Gjoleka never ceased his ties with the other nationalist Albanians and when the Ottomans and Montenegrins came in war against each other in 1852 Gjoleka together with Hodo Nivica formed a volunteer group of Southern Albanians numbering around 2,000 men and went to the frontier of the Ottoman Empire in noethern Malësia as a call of the Ottoman to protect the state, but also to protect Albanian lands and local Albanian population from the attacks of Montenigrins.They fought there against both the Central Ottoman government and against the Montenegrins being supported by Northern Albanian çetas. It was during this time he was asked his most famous question: "për kë lufton a derëzi" (for who do you fight o blackdoored) to which Gjoleka responded with "as për mua as për ti po për gjithë ketë Shqipëri" (neither for me and nor for you but for all of Albania) giving that he did not fight for Ghegs or Tosks but for all of Albanians. Sometime in 1852, he was ambushed near Shpuza by the Montenegrins along with Hodo Nivica, Gjik Thanasi and other Albanian warriors and fell martyred and was buried by the local Albanian population with high honors in the village where his grave remains to this day. Lesko Mingo threw himself before Gjoleka, dying to protect him as the Montenegrins started the attack, as many Albanian warriors fell in what was called the "Albanian Thermopylae" causing many casualties among slavs. Gjoleka while dying asked one of his closest friends and relatives Shuaip Qorduka to cut his head off so the Montenegrins would not get Gjoleka's head as a trophy, but Shuaip refused and himself fell in the ambush. Nonetheless, their bodies remained untouched after their deaths. In total during his life he won either 22 or 23 battles against the Ottomans and Montenegrins.

== Legacy ==
He is remembered in Albanian Folklore as a brave man and a man of knowledge, songs are dedicated to him which are sung in the south are accompanied with Iso polyphony and in the north accompanied with Lahuta. In 2003 a monument was built in his honor in his birth village. On 28 April 2012 Albanian President Bamir Topi posthumously awarded Gjoleka the Honor of Nation Order. There are many songs dedicated to him the most famous one being from his quote in 1852:
Për kë lufton a derëzi
As për mua as për ti
Por për gjithë këtë Shqipëri
Afërim të gjithë i thanë
Luftove me Padishanë
I nderove këto anë.
Today still Albanians say Të jesh trim sa ish Gjoleka to their newborn children meaning "may you be as brave as Gjoleka was".
