= Bënça =

River in Albania

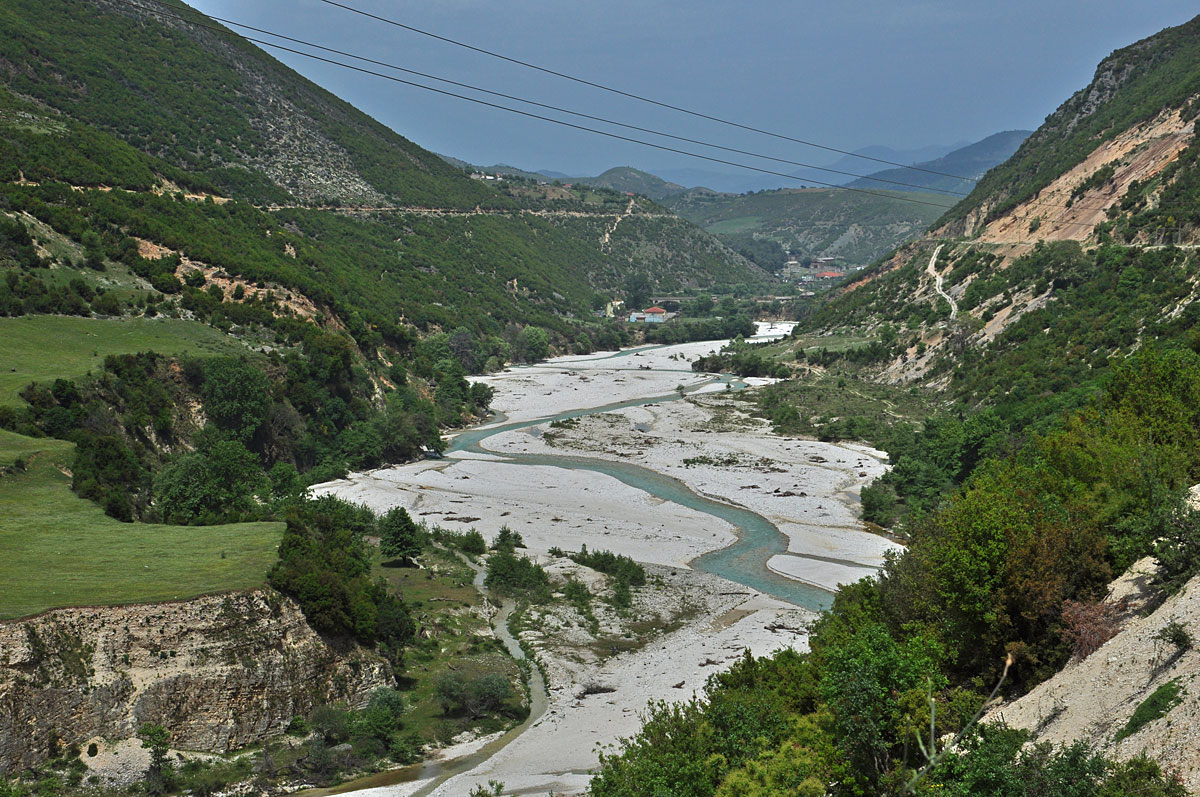
- Bënça river flowing towards Tepelenë

Location
- Country: Albania

Physical characteristics
- Mouth: Vjosa
  - coordinates: 40°18′0″N 20°1′0″E
- Length: 26 km (16 mi)
- Basin size: 188 km^{2} (73 sq mi)
- Discharge
  - average: 8.8 m^{3}/s (310 cu ft/s)

Bënça is a river in southern Albania and a major tributary of the Vjosa river system. Rising from the karst spring of Gurra e Progonatit on the Upper Kurvelesh Plateau, it flows for approximately 26 km (16 mi) before joining the Vjosa near Tepelenë. The river drains a catchment basin of 188 km² (73 sq mi), with a mean elevation of 954 m (3,130 ft) and an average annual discharge of about 8.8 m³/s (310 cu ft/s).

== Course ==
Bënça originates from karst springs on the Upper Kurvelesh Plateau and flows through a mountainous landscape characterized by deep valleys and limestone formations. Along its upper and middle reaches, the river is joined by several tributaries, including Gurra e Progonatit and the streams of Nivica, Dubenisht and Dilan.

In its lower course, the valley narrows considerably and the river often continues as a single channel without additional tributaries. Through prolonged erosion, Bënça and its tributaries have carved a deep canyon landscape marked by steep slopes, abrupt relief and rugged terrain.

== Hydrology ==
The Bënça basin is strongly influenced by karstic geology and tectonic uplift. Numerous karst springs emerge along the canyon between the villages of Merje and Memothoma and downstream of Bënçë, contributing significantly to the river’s discharge. Due to extensive underground drainage systems, some tributaries, particularly Gurra e Progonatit and sections of the Dubenisht Stream, lack clearly defined surface catchment areas.

Seasonal water-level fluctuations are relatively moderate compared to other Albanian mountain rivers. Water levels peak during winter, with a secondary rise in spring and decline through summer before increasing again in autumn. The abundance of karst springs helps sustain flow during dry periods. Hydrological measurements recorded a maximum water level of 310 mm in February 1956 and a minimum of 142 mm in July of that same year.

The river’s average annual discharge was measured at 7.14 m³/s (252 cu ft/s) in 1960, while the long-term average near its mouth is about 8.86 m³/s (313 cu ft/s). Recorded peak discharges have reached 223 m³/s (7,900 cu ft/s), reflecting significant seasonal variability.

== See also ==
- List of rivers of Albania
