= Dukaj, Gjirokastër =

Village in Albania

Dukaj
- Village
- Interactive map of Dukaj
- Coordinates: 40°19′18″N 19°57′01″E
- Country: Albania
- County: Gjirokastër
- Municipality: Tepelenë
- Administrative unit: Qendër
- Time zone: UTC+1 (CET)
  - Summer (DST): UTC+2 (CEST)

Dukaj is a village in the Qendër administrative unit, part of the Tepelenë Municipality, in Gjirokastër County, Albania.

== History and administrative context ==
Before the 2015 local government reform, Dukaj belonged to the former Qendër Commune within Tepelenë District. Following the enactment of Law No. 115/2014, the district system was abolished, and the village became part of Tepelenë Municipality under Gjirokastër County.

== See also ==
- Tepelenë
- Qendër, Tepelenë
