= Tepelenë District =

Defunct (2000) Albanian administrative area

- Former district
- Coordinates: 40°20′N 19°57′E
- Country: Albania
- Dissolved: 2000
- Seat: Tepelenë

Area
  - Total: 817 km^{2} (315 sq mi)

Population (2001)
  - Total: 32,465
  - Density: 39.7/km^{2} (103/sq mi)
- Time zone: UTC+1 (CET)
  - Summer (DST): UTC+2 (CEST)

Tepelenë District (Albanian: Rrethi i Tepelenës) was one of the 36 districts of Albania, which were dissolved in July 2000 and replaced by 12 newly created counties. It had a population of 32,465 in 2001, and an area of 817 km^{2} (315 sq mi). It was in the south of Albania, and its capital was the city of Tepelenë. Its territory is now part of Gjirokastër County: the municipalities of Tepelenë and Memaliaj.

== History ==
At the Vjosa (Greek:Aoos) Narrows ("Aoi Stena") in the district, a Macedonian army barred the way to Epirus and, in 198 BC, a decisive battle, the Battle of the Aous, took place between a Roman army commanded by Consul Titus Quinctius Flamininus and the Macedonians commanded by Philip V. After an attempt of a truce and an inconclusive battle, a shepherd led the Roman army to a point where the Macedonians could be attacked and the Romans won the battle.

== Administrative divisions ==
The district consisted of the following municipalities:

- Buz
- Krahës
- Kurvelesh
- Lopës
- Luftinjë
- Memaliaj
- Memaliaj Fshat
- Qendër
- Qesarat
- Tepelenë
