= Bënçë =

Village in Albania

- Village
- Interactive map of Bënçë
- Coordinates: 40°15′00″N 20°00′00″E
- Country: Albania
- County: Gjirokastër
- Municipality: Tepelenë
- Administrative unit: Qendër
- Elevation: 225 m (738 ft)
- Time zone: UTC+1 (CET)
  - Summer (DST): UTC+2 (CEST)

Bënçë (also spelled Bënça) is a village in the Qendër administrative unit, part of the Tepelenë Municipality, in Gjirokastër County, Albania. It lies about 6 km south of the town of Tepelenë, near the confluence of the Bënça River with the Vjosa.

== History and administrative context ==
Prior to the 2015 local government reform, Bënça was part of the former Qendër Commune in Tepelenë District. With the implementation of Law No. 115/2014, the district system was abolished and the village became part of the Tepelenë Municipality under Gjirokastër County.

== See also ==
- Tepelenë
