= Selam Musai =

Albanian military leader

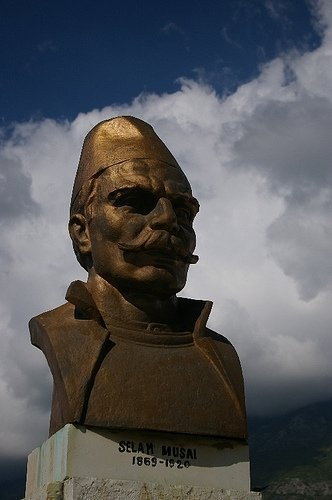
- Selam Musai Statue
- Born: Selam Musa Salaria; 1857; Salari, Tepelenë District, Ottoman Empire (modern Albania)
- Died: June 12, 1920 (aged 62–63); Vlora, Principality of Albania
- Known for: putting himself in front of a cannon to defend his younger co-fighters and give them more courage to go ahead and attack.
- Awards: Hero of the People

Selam Musa Salaria or Selam Musai (1857–1920) was one of the Albanian military leaders of the Vlora War. He died fighting at the advanced age of 63. Posthumously he was awarded the People's Hero of Albania medal.

== Life ==
He was born in 1857 in Salari, Tepelenë District, Gjirokaster County, Ottoman Empire from a patriotic Albanian family. In 1912, during the Occupation of Albania (1912–1913), he fought against the Greek forces. He was wounded during the battles.

In 1920 he became a member of the National Defense Committee. He actively participated in the Battle of Vlora when he was 63 years old, and at Qafë-Koçi was killed on 12 June (at 22:00) 1920, putting himself in front of an artillery piece to defend his younger comrades and give them more courage to advance and attack.

== See also ==
People's Hero of Albania
