= Damës, Gjirokastër =

Damës
- Village
- Location within Albania
- Coordinates: 40°20′03″N 20°01′37″E
- Country: Albania
- County: Gjirokastër
- Municipality: Memaliaj
- Administrative unit: Memaliaj Fshat
- Time zone: UTC+1 (CET)
  - Summer (DST): UTC+2 (CEST)

Damës (also, Damasi, Damësi and Damsi) is a village in the former Memaliaj Fshat municipality, Gjirokastër County, Albania. At the 2015 local government reform it became part of the municipality Memaliaj.
