= Gramoz Ruçi =

Albanian politician (born 1951)

Gramoz Ruçi MP

37th Speaker of the Parliament of Albania
- In office 9 September 2017 – 10 September 2021
- Prime Minister: Edi Rama
- Preceded by: Ilir Meta
- Succeeded by: Lindita Nikolla

Minister of Internal Affairs
- In office February 22, 1991 – May 10, 1991
- Prime Minister: Fatos Nano
- Preceded by: Hekuran Isai
- Succeeded by: Aredin Shyti

Member of the Parliament
- In office 15 April 1991 – 10 September 2021

Personal details
- Born: 6 December 1951 (age 74) Salari, Tepelenë, Gjirokastër County, People's Republic of Albania
- Party: Party of Labour (until 1991); Socialist Party

Gramoz Ruçi (born 6 December 1951) is an Albanian former politician who served as the head of the parliamentarian group of the ruling Socialist Party of Albania until 2017. In September 2017, he assumed the office of the Chairman of the Parliament of Albania for the new parliamentary session.

== Early life ==
Ruçi was born in Salari, a village in Tepelenë District, southern Albania. He graduated in Chemistry and worked as a teacher in Progonat. There, he met his future wife, who was from the Goxharaj family. They married in 1976. In 1985, Ruçi entered politics.

== Political career ==
He was named the Labour Party's First Secretary of Tepelena District in 1988, and in 1990 he was named Minister of the Interior; however, he kept that position for only two and a half months. He was also the minister responsible for the infamous Directorate of State Security (Albanian: Drejtoria e Sigurimit të Shtetit), commonly called the Sigurimi. Its stated goal was protecting Albania from dangers, but de facto the Sigurimi served to suppress political activity in the population and hold the existing political system in place. From 1992 to 1996, he was Secretary General of the Socialist Party, the successor party of the Labour Party. Beginning in 1997, he was a member of parliament for the Socialist Party. In 2000, he was chosen as leader of the parliamentary group, remaining in that post until 2005. Since 2009, he has again served as head of the parliamentary group.

In September 2021 he leaves politics.

== Personal life ==
Ruçi's daughter Ridvana is a senior official at the Albanian ombudsman. She completed her studies in law at the Public University of Athens. His son Ledian, born in 1985, completed his bachelor's degree in International Studies in Athens.

Gramoz speaks Albanian, Greek and Italian. He has two granddaughters and a grandson, Mia, Hera, and Roi, from his daughter.
