= Mezhgoran =

- Village
- Location within Albania
- Coordinates: 40°19′8″N 20°5′35″E
- Country: Albania
- County: Gjirokastër
- Municipality: Tepelenë
- Administrative unit: Qendër Tepelenë
- Time zone: UTC+1 (CET)
  - Summer (DST): UTC+2 (CEST)

Mezhgoran is a community in the Gjirokastër County, southern Albania. At the 2015 local government reform it became part of the Tepelenë municipality.
