= Luzat =

Village in Albania

- Village
- Interactive map of Luzat
- Coordinates: 40°15′31″N 20°2′17″E
- Country: Albania
- County: Gjirokastër
- Municipality: Tepelenë
- Administrative unit: Qendër Tepelenë
- Elevation: 315 m (1,033 ft)
- Demonym(s): Luzatar; Luzatarët
- Time zone: UTC+1 (CET)
  - Summer (DST): UTC+2 (CEST)

Luzat (also spelled Luzati) is a village in the Qendër Tepelenë administrative unit, part of the Tepelenë Municipality, in Gjirokastër County, Albania.

== Geography ==
Luzat is located at approximately 40° 15′ 31″ N, 20° 2′ 17″ E. The village lies at an elevation of about 315 m (1,033 ft) above sea level.

== Administrative context ==
Luzat falls under the Qendër Tepelenë administrative unit, within Tepelenë Municipality—established under Law No. 115/2014, which reorganized local government units across Albania.

== Location and surroundings ==
The village is about 1.6 km from the main national road connecting Tepelenë and Gjirokastër, positioned in a hilly landscape near the Vjosa River.
