= Isuf Kalo =

Albanian doctor (1942–2023)

- Born: 1942; Luzat, Tepelenë, Albania
- Died: January 19, 2023 (aged 80–81)
- Education: University of Tirana
- Occupations: Doctor, professor of medicine
- Known for: Pioneering work in diabetology and endocrinology in Albania; personal physician to Enver Hoxha until 1985
- Awards: Distinguished Scientist Worker Award of Albania

Isuf Kalo (1942 – 19 January 2023) was an Albanian doctor and professor of medicine.

== Early life and education ==
Born in Luzat, Tepelenë, Albania, Kalo completed his studies at the Faculty of Medicine in Tirana University in 1964. He specialized in several European countries in diabetology and endocrinology.

== Career ==
He was one of the pioneers of this domain in Albania. For several years he was chair of endocrinology and metabolic diseases in the Faculty of Medicine and in the University Hospital of Tirana. He was a Doctor of Medical Sciences, Professor of Medicine and honoured with the Distinguished Scientist Worker Award of Albania. Until 1985 he was the personal doctor of the communist dictator Enver Hoxha.

Between 1991 and 2004 Kalo was employed by the World Health Organization's Regional Office for Europe (in Copenhagen), heading the European Diabetes Program and later the Quality of Health System Programme in Europe. He was the author of a series of publications in the medical press of his country and abroad, and he was an honorary member of several international committees and medical associations in Europe.
