= Vlora War =

1920 conflict between Italy and Albania

- Part of Collapse of the Principality of Albania
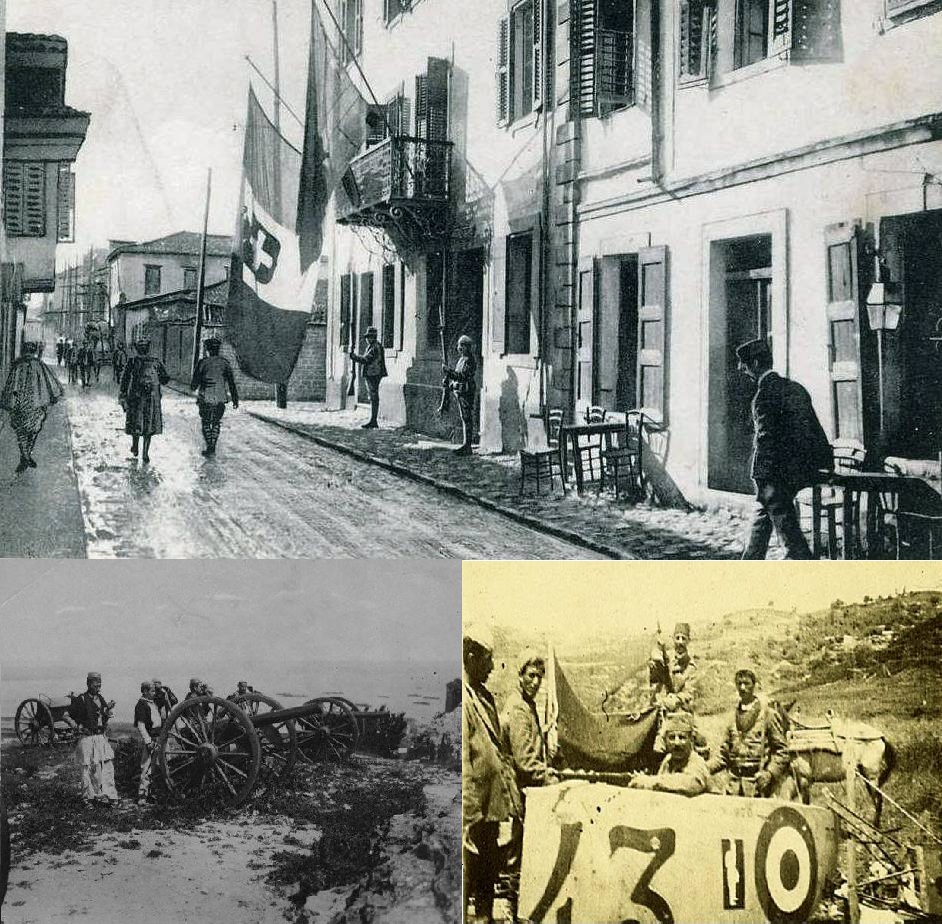
- Clockwise from top: Italian base; Albanian soldiers with wreckage of an Italian aircraft; Italian cannons captured by Albanian irregulars during one of the battles
Date	June 4 – August 2, 1920
Location	Vlorë region, southern Albania
Result	See aftermath
Territorial changes	Vlorë relinquished to Albania by Italy; Saseno island annexed by Italy

Belligerents
(Principality of Albania) Albanian nationalists	(Kingdom of Italy) Italy

Commanders and leaders
(Principality of Albania) Qazim Koculi (Principality of Albania) Ahmet Lepenica (Principality of Albania) Selam Musai † (Principality of Albania) Spiro Jorgo Koleka (Principality of Albania) Fani Shuka (MIA) (Principality of Albania) Aristidh Ruçi (Principality of Albania) Xhemal Aranitasi (Principality of Albania) Aziz Çami (Principality of Albania) Llazar Bozo (Principality of Albania) Ahmet Zogu	(Kingdom of Italy) Giovanni Giolitti (Kingdom of Italy) Settimio Piacentini (Kingdom of Italy) Enrico Gotti †

Strength
10,000 troops, of which 3,000–4,000 engaged	About 25,000 troops, vast majority due to an outbreak of malaria: Adriatic Fleet (incl. dreadnought Caio Duilio under Captain Fausto Gambardella, armored cruiser San Giorgio, torpedo boats, destroyers, and supply vessels)

Casualties and losses
Unknown	Large losses by mid-June 1920.(claimed by Albania); 570 Italian POWs at Tepelena on 13 July 1920.

The Vlora War (Albanian: Lufta e Vlorës or Lufta e Njëzetës) or Vlora crisis (Italian: Crisi di Valona) was a military conflict in the Vlorë region of Albania between the Kingdom of Italy and Albanian nationalists. Vlorë, occupied by Italy since late 1914 (six months before it joined the Allied Powers and entered World War I), was attacked four times by Albanian nationalists. While repelling the attacks, the Italian troops suffered from an outbreak of malaria and could not receive support as the Bersaglieri of Ancona refused to be sent to Albania, in the context of the Biennio Rosso agitations. Italian prime minister Giovanni Giolitti, considering the occupation of Vlorë pointless and unpopular, negotiated a treaty of compromise with the Albanians. This resulted in Italy abandoning its plans to gain a League of Nations mandate to rule Albania and ending its occupation of Vlorë, while it retained diplomatic protection over Albania to ensure its independence and annexed the island of Saseno. The armistice agreement was confirmed a year later by the Conference of Ambassadors of the League of Nations, confirming Albanian sovereignty and Italy's special interests in the country.

The Vlora War is considered an important moment in the history of Albania's independence. At the same time, the 1920 treaty of Tirana is considered the first of the Treaties of Tirana, which gradually brought Albania into the Italian sphere of influence. Both the Albanian committee and the Italian foreign ministry claimed victory and expressed satisfaction with the agreements; many authors do not treat these clashes as forming an actual conflict and the very concept of a "Vlora War" is rare in historiography.

== Background ==
Before joining the Triple Entente as an ally in World War I, the Kingdom of Italy signed the secret Treaty of London. Under this agreement, Italy promised to declare war on Germany and Austria-Hungary within one month in exchange for territorial gains at the end of the war. Articles 6 and 7 of the treaty dealt with the promised territories in Albania that Italy would receive:

Italy shall receive full sovereignty over Valona, the island of Saseno and surrounding territory...

— Article 6

Having obtained the Trentino and Istria by Article 4, Dalmatia and the Adriatic islands by Article 5, and also the gulf of Valona, Italy undertakes, in the event a small, autonomous, and neutralized state being formed in Albania Italy not to oppose the possible desire of France, Great Britain, and Russia to repartition the northern and the southern districts of Albania between Montenegro, Serbia, and Greece. The southern coast of Albania, from the frontier of the Italian territory of Valona to Cape Stilos, is to be neutralized. Italy will be conceded the right of concluding the foreign relations of Albania; in any case, Italy will be bound to secure for Albania a territory sufficiently extensive to enable its frontiers to join those of Greece and Serbia to the west of Lake Ochrida...

— Article 7

At the Paris Peace Conference in 1920, the Allies had not yet decided on the future of Albania, but Italy's claims to sovereignty over Vlorë had never faced a significant challenge. Prime Minister Francesco Saverio Nitti also sought a mandate over the rest of the country following the secret Treaty of London.

The Vlora War unfolded through a mix of political mobilization, sudden localized offensives, and heavy conventional engagements that ultimately forced Italian forces off the Albanian mainland.

On 28 November 1919, public demonstrations broke out in Vlora to mark the anniversary of the 1912 Albanian Declaration of Independence. When crowds defended national symbols, Italian carabinieri intervened forcefully, touching off street clashes that deeply aggravated local sentiment.

From 21-31 January 1920, Albanian delegates gathered from across the country for the Congress of Lushnja. Meeting in defiance of foreign pressure, the delegates rejected partition plans, formed a national government led by Sulejman Delvina, and established Tirana as the provisional capital.

== Course of war ==
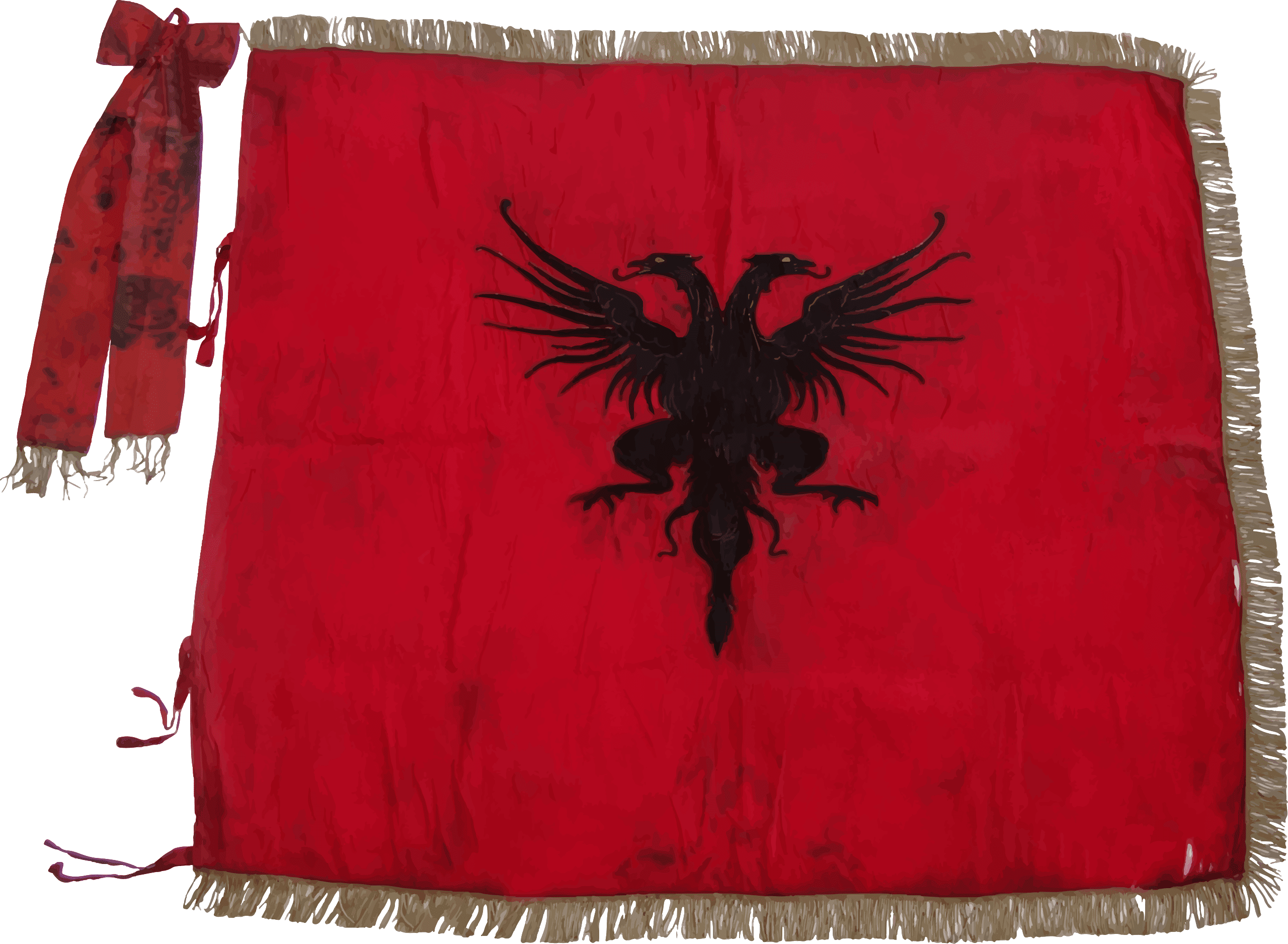
Illustration of the flag raised during the war

On 28 or 29 May 1920, an assembly in Barçallë was held by representatives from the city of Vlora and the villages of the region. A National Defense Committee was formed with Osman Haxhiu as its chairman, while a military committee was headed by Qazim Koculi, and military officers led by Ahmet Lepenica. The assembly called for the population to rise up. Plans for an armed rebellion were put into motion.

The conflict began on 4 June 1920, after Italian General Settimo Piacentini refused to cede control of the Vlora district to the Albanian government. Previously, Albania had successfully expelled the occupying Italians from most of the country. After Italy refused the request of Ahmet Zogu—the Albanian Minister of the Interior at the time—to continue the evacuation, Albanian irregulars began to organize. Insurgents led by Koculi ordered an attack the following day. Lepenica took command of the force, which consisted of about 4,000 soldiers. The Albanian rebels were poorly armed; some did not carry firearms and resorted to sticks and stones. In the area around Vlora, there were about 25,000 Italian soldiers equipped with artillery. Multiple Italian-held positions across the region were hit simultaneously, including Kota, Tepelena, Gorishti, Dukati, Drashovica, Mazhari, Gjormi, Matohasanaj, and Llogaraja.

The Albanians fought in the Vlora region and were joined by local volunteers, resulting in a force of over 10,000 irregular fighters. Despite the increase in numbers, only up to 4,000 Albanians participated in the conflict. This force included the Banda e Vatrës, an Albanian military band formed in the United States that traveled by ship for 23 days to reach the port city of Durrës. The advance of the Albanian troops and the communist revolutionary movements, coupled with riots in the Italian army, made it impossible to reinforce the Italian soldiers in Vlora. As a result, the Italian soldiers barricaded themselves in Vlora, facing malaria and communist agitation in their ranks, and without receiving any orders; despite these impediments they defended the city from four attacks, on 5, 6, and 11 June, and on 24 July.

On 6 June, Albanian volunteers assaulted the heavily fortified Italian garrison at Kota, which was dug in with barbed wire, machine-gun nests, and mountain artillery under the command of General Enrico Gotti. After hours of fierce close-quarters fighting, the insurgents cracked the defenses, killing garrison commander General Enrico Gotti and Colonel Cavallo, and taking roughly 600 prisoners.

On 8-9 June, following the fall of Kota, fighting intensified as insurgent bands engaged Italian units at Asna, the Babica pass, and Kaninë, capturing surrounding outposts and closing the ring around Vlora.

On 12 June, Insurgent forces closed in on the immediate outer edges of Vlora city. Heavy combat erupted near the hospital district, resulting in fierce firefights and the death of several prominent fighters, including veteran commander Selam Musai.

On 17-18 June, Italian military tried to turn the tide, launching a large-scale counteroffensive involving over 5,000 troops backed by naval gunfire support, heavy artillery, and aircraft strafing from Shashica mountain. Albanian fighters engaged in heavy defensive battles against the counterattack and managed to shoot down one of the Italian military planes during the aerial clashes.

On 8 July, the military situation bogged down and active fighting tapered off into a stalemate around the entrenched Italian perimeter. Italian envoy Baron Alioti floated a compromise peace plan to keep Sazan Island and the Skela port, but talks dragged on. Back home, Prime Minister Giovanni Giolitti was dealing with crippling socialist strikes, angry anti-colonial protests, and economic fatigue, leaving him unable to ship fresh troops across the Adriatic.

== End of hostilities ==
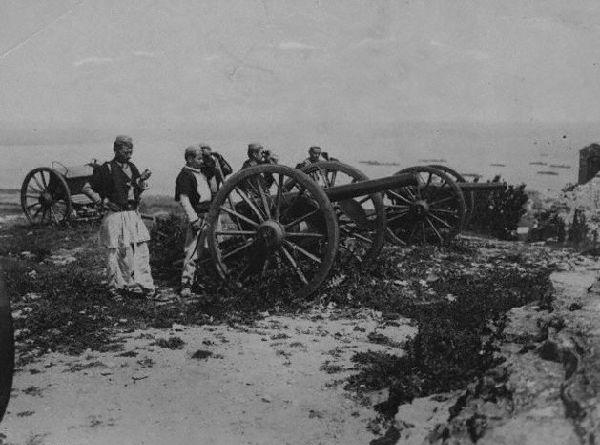
Italian cannons captured by Albanian irregulars during one of the battles

The military stalemate continued for three months until the Italian and Albanian governments signed the Treaty of Tirana on 2 August 1920, which ended the conflict.

Italy undertakes to recognize and defend the autonomy of Albania and, retaining only Saseno, abandons Vallona.

It was the first diplomatic agreement between Albania and a foreign country. The pact prevented further partition of the territory of the Albanian state. Albania managed to achieve full recognition by the Western powers of its independence within its 1913 borders. Under the agreement, Rome formally acknowledged Albania's full sovereignty and territorial integrity while agreeing to pull its troops out of the mainland.

The armistice, introducing a ceasefire on 5 August, contained these main points:

1. The Italian Government completely acknowledged the independence, territorial integrity, and sovereignty of Albania, within the frontiers defined in 1913 by the Conference of Ambassadors in London.
2. The Italian government relinquished its protectorate proclaimed in 1917 and the occupation and administration of Vlorë and its hinterland, and renounced all claims against Albania and all interference in Albanian political affairs, and abandoned the idea of a mandate over the country.
3. The Italian government agreed to withdraw its war materials from Vlorë and its hinterland, to evacuate all its holdings on the Albanian mainland, and to repatriate at an early date the Italian troops actually stationed in Vlorë and on the littoral, and all its forces still remaining in other parts of Albanian territory with the exception of the garrison on the island of Sazan at the entrance of the Vlorë bay; Italy retained the permanent possession only of the island of Sazan, but remained in temporary occupation of Cape Linguetta and cape Treporti, both dominating Vlorë bay, with the right to fortify them; the detachment of troops at Shkodër was also to remain in that town.
4. There would take place an exchange of prisoners, the liberation of arrested persons under a general mutual amnesty, and the settlement of outstanding questions concerning the private interests of Albanian and Italian subjects.

The Treaty of Tirana was ratified by the League of Nations Conference of Ambassadors in November 1921. It recognized Italian special interests in Albania while reaffirming Albanian independence. Giovanni Giolitti, the Italian Prime Minister at the time, expressed his satisfaction with the treaty in these words:

What really interests us is that Vallona cannot form a base of operations against us; and this aim was achieved with the occupation of the islet of Sasseno, which lies at the mouth of the bay itself... For these reasons, I decided to renounce the mandate conferred on us by the Paris Conference on Albania, which would have represented an enormous liability without any profit, and to limit our action to the diplomatic protection of Albania against the aims of other States, and to abandon Vallona, ensuring however recognition of the possession of Sasseno

By 2-3 September, the final Italian units cleared out of Vlora and Skela, wrapping up the evacuation and leaving the region entirely back in Albanian hands.

However, Benito Mussolini referred to Vlora as the "Albanian Caporetto". Nonetheless, upon taking power, he also ensured Albanian independence to defend the Italian interests, causing the 1923 Corfu crisis after a border disagreement with Greece.

== Orders of battle ==
=== Albanian order of battle ===
Albanian order of battle
Force	Commander
Forces from Shullëri	Commander Kalo Telhai
Forces from Kutë	Commander Rrapo Çelo and Halim Rakipi
Forces from Dukat	Commander Sheme Sadiku and Hodo Zeqiri
Forces from Lumi i Vlorës	Commander Sali Vranishti
Forces from Fëngu	Commander Muço Aliu
Forces from Kanina	Commander Beqir Velo
Forces from Salari	Commander Selam Musai
Forces from Kurvelesh	Commander Riza Runa
Forces from Fterra	Commander Xhaferr Shehu
Forces from Mallakastër	Commander Bektash Çakrani and Halim Hamiti
Forces from Skrapar	Commander Riza Kodheli
Forces from Berat	Commander Seit Toptani and Izedin Vrioni and Fani Shuka
Forces from Peqin	Commander Adem Gjinishi
Forces from Gjirokastër	Commander Javer Hurshiti and Xhevdet Picari
Forces from Çamëria	Commander Alush Seit Taka and Muharrem Rushiti
Forces from Korça	Captain Ferit Frashëri and Tosun Selenica
Forces from Tirana	Captain Ismail Haki Kuçi
Albanian-American Volunteers	Captain Aqif Përmeti and Kareiman Tatzani

=== Italian order of battle ===
Italian order of battle
Area	Commander	Military Strength
Vlorë–Kaninë area	Commander: General Settimo Piacentin; Division commander: General Emanuele Pugliese; Division aid: General De Luca	Center of High Command of 36th division forces
Kotë	Carabinieri forces: General Enrico Gotti; Garrison: Cavallo Michele	Road, food, and hospital center; 4th command of mixed artillery; alpine battalion; 72nd battalion of infantry
Gjorm	Captain Bergamaschi	Center of a machine gun company
Matohasanaj Castle	Commander major	72 infantry battalion; infantry regiment; 182nd mountain artillery section (70 mm)
Tepelenë Castle	Major Bronzini	Infantry battalion; 157th artillery section; Carabinieri forces
Llogara Pass	Captain Boansea	Part of 35th battalion of 35th regiment of Bersaglieri; 105th report
Himarë	General Rossi, Colonel Manganeli	Center of command of 35th regiment of Bersaglieri
Selenicë	Major Guadalupi	
Vlora Gulf		Battleships San Mario, Bruceti, Dulio, Alkina, Orion; torpedo boat Arcione
Ujë i Ftohtë region (outskirt south of Vlorë)		Aviation forces
Panaja		Central magazines of the Italian army
Vajzë – hospital and post command		

== Sources ==
- Bego, Fabio (2017). "The Vlora Conflict from a Trans-Adriatic Perspective: History, Myth and Ideology". Myths and Mythical Spaces: Conditions and Challenges for a Mythology of Europe. V&R unipress. pp. 97–136. doi:10.14220/9783737008112.97. ISBN 978-3-7370-0811-2.
