= Salari =

- Village
- Location within Albania
- Coordinates: 40°19′17″N 19°53′52″E
- Country: Albania
- County: Gjirokastër
- Municipality: Tepelenë
- Administrative unit: Qendër Tepelenë
- Time zone: UTC+1 (CET)
  - Summer (DST): UTC+2 (CEST)

Salari (Albanian definite form: Salaria) is a community in the Gjirokastër County, southern Albania. At the 2015 local government reform it became part of the municipality Tepelenë.

== Notable people ==
- Selam Musai, People's Hero of Albania
- Gramoz Ruçi, politician
- Njazi Islami, WW2 resistance fighter and former Minister of Communications
- Valentina Leskaj, former Minister of Labor and Social Affairs
- Former ministers: Ethem Ruka, Luan Memushi, Elmaz Sherifi
