= Ylli Baka =

Albanian folk singer (born 1969)

- Born: 16 May 1969 (age 57); Tepelenë, PSR Albania
- Occupations: Singer; songwriter
- Years active: 1992–present
- Children: 3
- Musical career
- Genres: Albanian folk music; Southern Albanian folk
- Instrument: Vocals

Ylli Baka (born 16 May 1969) is an Albanian folk singer and songwriter. He is primarily associated with the traditional folk music of southern Albania.

== Early life and education ==
Baka was born in Tepelenë, Albania. He spent parts of his youth in Berat and later in Memaliaj, where he completed his secondary education. He did not attend a formal music conservatory. During a period of emigration in Greece, he undertook a four-year vocal training course.

== Career ==
Baka first appeared before the public as a professional singer in 1992, performing in concerts in Tepelenë and Përmet. Shortly afterward, he emigrated to Greece, where he worked as a singer and drummer, performing regularly in music venues in Athens. During this time, his repertoire included both folk and non-folk material.

His first album, Fllad Jugu, was recorded in the 1990s but received limited distribution. Wider recognition followed the release of his 2004 album Këngët e vendit tim, which focused on traditional and regional Albanian songs.

Since the 2000s, Baka has continued to perform primarily Albanian folk music. His concert activity has included performances within Albania as well as for Albanian communities abroad, particularly in Europe, the United States, and Australia. He is based in Tirana.

== Discography ==
=== Albums ===
- Fllad Jugu (recorded in the 1990s; limited release)
- Këngët e vendit tim (2004)

=== Selected songs ===
- Më vjen mall për Tepelenën
- Baba Tomorri
- Lëmë, o Zot, të rroj
- Sa e dua Shqipërinë
- Shëndeti është i pari
- Ku ka rrjedhur, do pikojë

== Awards and honors ==
Baka has received several forms of official cultural recognition in Albania, including the following:

- On 22 January 2021, he was awarded the state title Mjeshtër i Madh (Grand Master) by the President of Albania, Ilir Meta, in recognition of his contribution to Albanian folk music and cultural life.
- On 23 January 2021, he was named an Qytetar Nderi i Memaliajt (Honorary Citizen of Memaliaj) by the Municipality of Memaliaj, the certificate was presented during an official ceremony by the mayor, Gjolek Guci.
