= Beçisht =

Village in Albania

Beçisht is a village in southern Albania in the region and municipality of Gjirokastër and in the right bank of the Vjosa River. It is said that Ali Pasha of Yanina was born on this village or Tepelenë that is adjacent.
