= Ahmet Lepenica =

Albanian military personnel (1872–1941)

- Born: Ahmet Islam Canaj; 1872; Lepenica
- Died: January 14, 1941 (aged 68–69); Lepenica
- Military career
- Allegiance: Albania
- Commands: Albanian forces
- Conflicts: Vlora War
- Awards: Honor of the Nation

Ahmet Lepenica born Ahmet Islam Canaj (1872–1941) was an Albanian fighter and commander, known for his role in Battle of Vlora when Albanian irregulars under his leadership fought against Italian troops. Ahmet Lepenica was born in 1872 in Lepenica village in Vlora region. As an adult he served in the Ottoman army where he reached the rank of a captain. He deserted the Ottoman army in 1912 and protected the Vlora region and Albanian delegates during the Albanian Declaration of Independence. From 1912 to 1914 while elevated in the rank of Major and appointed as a commander of Albanian gendarme forces, he fought against Greek irregulars in South Albania. He retired in his native village when Southern Albania was invaded by Italian troops during World War I. In 1919 he became active again in Albanian politics and in 1920 he was appointed as the commander in chief of Albanian forces during Vlora War. The Albanian success in the battlefield was followed by a peace treaty with Italy, in which Italy acknowledged the territorial integrity of Albanian state. After that, he was appointed as a commander of Albanian gendarmes in Vlora region. Ahmet Lepenica participated in the Democratic Revolution of 1924 in Albania, and when Ahmet Zogu forces returned he migrated in the Kingdom of Yugoslavia. In 1926 he was pardoned by Ahmet Zogu and allowed to return in his native village. He died there on 14 January 1941. For his role he was decorated several times in 1962, 1992, 2005 and 2009.
