= Xhevdet Picari =

Albanian military figure

Xhevdet Picari was an Albanian military figure from Gjirokastër. He was a commander during the Vlora War.
