= Qendër Tepelenë =

- Administrative unit
- Location within Albania
- Coordinates: 40°16′N 20°2′E
- Country: Albania
- County: Gjirokastër
- Municipality: Tepelenë

Population (2011)
  - Administrative unit: 3,179
- Time zone: UTC+1 (CET)
  - Summer (DST): UTC+2 (CEST)

Qendër Tepelenë is a former municipality in the Gjirokastër County, southern Albania. At the 2015 local government reform it became a subdivision of the municipality Tepelenë. The population at the 2011 census was 3,179. The municipal unit consists of the villages Dukaj, Salari, Turan, Mamaj, Veliqot, Bënçë, Dragot, Beçisht, Mezhgoran, Peshtan, Hormovë, Lekël, Kodër and Luzat.
