= Villages of Gjirokastër County =

The Gjirokastër County in southern Albania is subdivided into 7 municipalities. These municipalities contain 273 towns and villages:
