= Memaliaj =

- Municipality
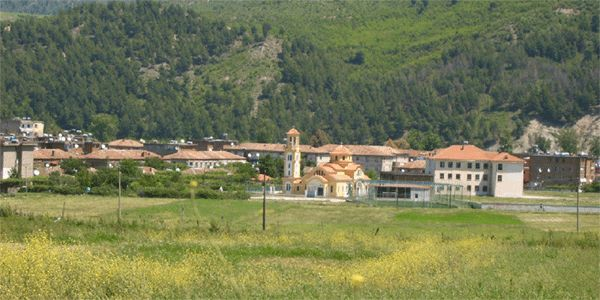

- Emblem

- Location within Albania
- Coordinates: 40°21′N 19°59′E
- Country: Albania
- County: Gjirokastër

Government
  - Mayor: Albert Malaj (BF)

Area
  - Municipality: 372.30 km^{2} (143.75 sq mi)
- Elevation: 130 m (430 ft)

Population (2011)
  - Municipality: 10,657
  - Municipality density: 28.625/km^{2} (74.138/sq mi)
  - Administrative unit: 2,647
- Time zone: UTC+1 (CET)
  - Summer (DST): UTC+2 (CEST)
- Postal Code: 6302
- Area Code: (0)885
- Website: www.memaliaj.gov.al

Memaliaj is a town and a municipality in Gjirokastër County, southern Albania. It was formed at the 2015 local government reform by the merger of the former municipalities Buz, Krahës, Luftinjë, Memaliaj, Memaliaj Fshat and Qesarat, that became municipal units. The seat of the municipality is the town Memaliaj. The total population is 10,657 (2011 census), in a total area of 372.30 square kilometres (143.75 sq mi). The population of the former municipality at the 2011 census was 2,647. It is entirely populated by Albanians, both Muslim Bektashis and Eastern Orthodox Christians. The dialect of Albanian spoken in the region is Tosk.

== History ==
In 2 December of 1942 in Memaliaj under the supervision of the Albanian National Liberation Council was founded the first National Liberation Committee of Tepelenë.

In 1958 Memaliaj became famous for the newly established Coal Mine, which multiplied the coal profit of Albania by 64 times, in contrast with older mines of 1938.

== Notable people ==
- Agron Llakaj, comedian
- Foto Strakosha, former goal keeper
- Thomas Strakosha, goal keeper, son of Foto Strakosha
- Ylli Baka, singer
