= Kurvelesh =

Kurvelesh may refer to:

- Kurvelesh (region), a region in southern Albania
- Kurvelesh, Tepelenë, an administrative unit in the municipality of Tepelenë, Albania
