= Memaliaj Fshat =

- Administrative unit
- Location within Albania
- Coordinates: 40°20′N 19°59′E
- Country: Albania
- County: Gjirokastër
- Municipality: Memaliaj

Population (2011)
  - Administrative unit: 1,606
- Time zone: UTC+1 (CET)
  - Summer (DST): UTC+2 (CEST)

Memaliaj Fshat is a village and a former municipality in the Gjirokastër County, southern Albania. At the 2015 local government reform it became a subdivision of the municipality Memaliaj. The population at the 2011 census was 1,606. The municipal unit consists of the villages Memaliaj Fshat, Vasjar, Cerrilë, Mirinë, Damës, Kallëmb, Kashisht and Bylysh.
