= Krahës =

- Administrative unit
- Location within Albania
- Coordinates: 40°26′N 19°51′E
- Country: Albania
- County: Gjirokastër
- Municipality: Memaliaj

Population (2011)
  - Administrative unit: 2,554
- Time zone: UTC+1 (CET)
  - Summer (DST): UTC+2 (CEST)

Krahës is a village in Gjirokastër County, southern Albania. It formerly functioned as a municipality, but at the 2015 local government reform, it became a subdivision of the municipality Memaliaj.

Its population at the 2011 census was 2,554.

== Etymology ==
The etymology of Krahes is in Albanian, as it derives from the word Krah (Albanian for arm).
