= Qesarat =

- Administrative unit
- Location within Albania
- Coordinates: 40°23′N 19°53′E
- Country: Albania
- County: Gjirokastër
- Municipality: Memaliaj

Population (2011)
  - Administrative unit: 1,379
- Time zone: UTC+1 (CET)
  - Summer (DST): UTC+2 (CEST)

Qesarat is a village and a former municipality in the Gjirokastër County, southern Albania. At the 2015 local government reform it became a subdivision of the municipality Memaliaj. The population at the 2011 census was 1,379. The municipal unit consists of the villages Qesarat, Iliras, Amanikaj, Toç, Anëvjosë, Koshtan and Kamçisht.

== Name ==
Its name contains the Albanian suffix -at, widely used to form toponyms from personal names and surnames.
