= Luftinjë =

- Administrative unit
- Location within Albania
- Coordinates: 40°27′N 19°57′E
- Country: Albania
- County: Gjirokastër
- Municipality: Memaliaj

Population (2011)
  - Administrative unit: 1,734
- Time zone: UTC+1 (CET)
  - Summer (DST): UTC+2 (CEST)

Luftinjë is a village and a former municipality in the Gjirokastër County, southern Albania. At the 2015 local government reform it became a subdivision of the municipality Memaliaj. The population at the 2011 census was 1,734. The municipal unit consists of the villages Izvor, Luftinjë, Luftinjë e Sipërme, Rrapaj, Rabie, Gllavë e Vogël, Maricaj, Arrëz e Madhe, Vagalat, Tosk Martalloz, Dervishaj, Zhapokikë, Zhapokikë e Sipërme, Ballaj and Luadhaj.
