= Buz, Albania =

Buz
- Administrative unit
- Location within Albania
- Coordinates: 40°27′N 20°0′E
- Country: Albania
- County: Gjirokastër
- Municipality: Memaliaj

Population (2011)
  - Administrative unit: 737
- Time zone: UTC+1 (CET)
  - Summer (DST): UTC+2 (CEST)

Buz is a village and a former municipality in the Gjirokastër County, southern Albania. At the 2015 local government reform it became a subdivision of the municipality Memaliaj. The population at the 2011 census was 737. The municipal unit consists of the villages Buz, Kalemaj, Badër, Kurtjez, Golemaj, Arrëz e Vogël, Shalës, Xhafaj, Gllavë, Selckë, Selckë e Vogël, Komar and Bardhaj.

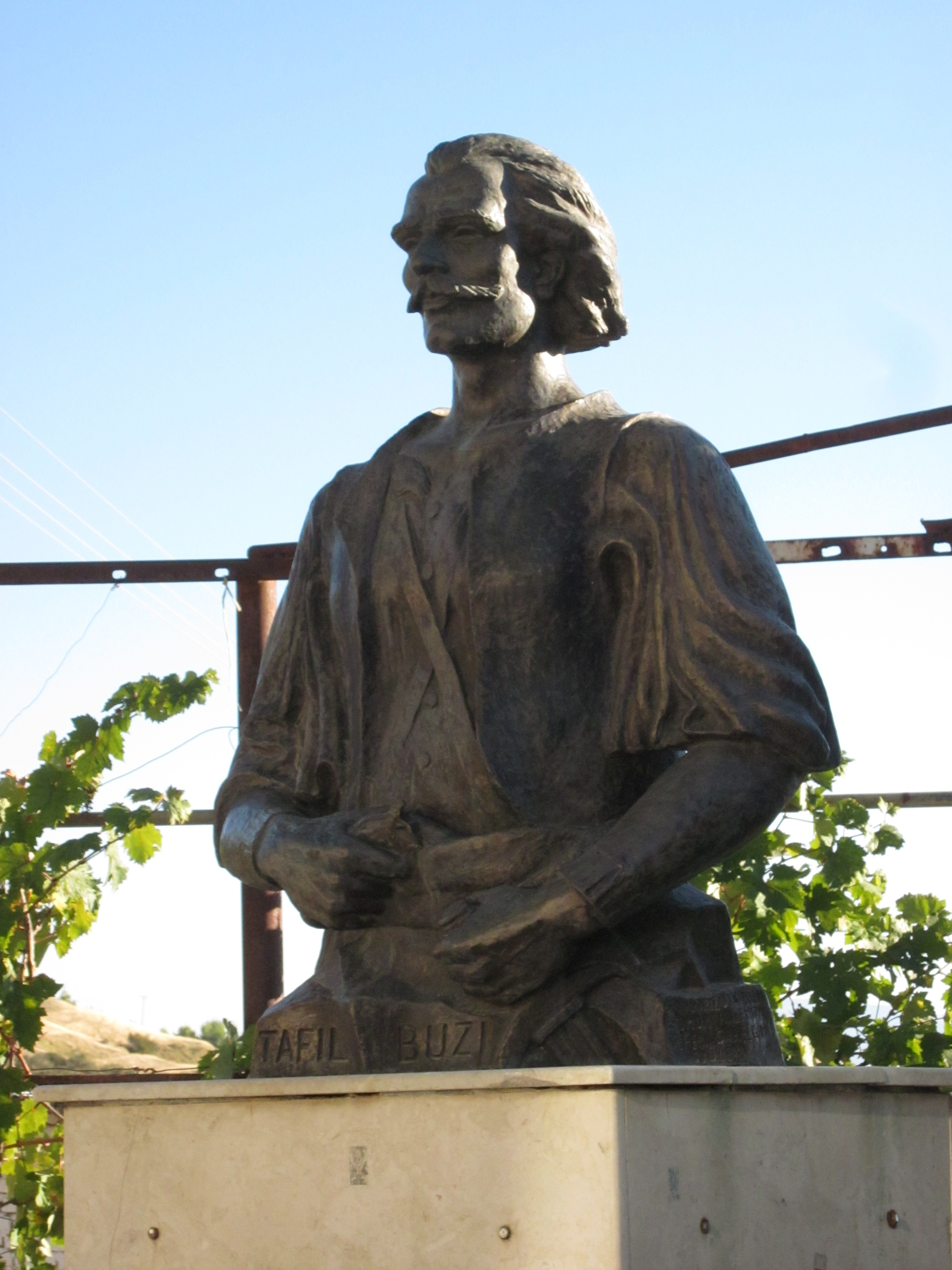
Statue of Tafil Buzi, in the town of Buz, Albania

A statue can be found there for Tafil Buzi (1792-1844).
