= Lopës =

- Administrative unit
- Location within Albania
- Coordinates: 40°22′N 19°50′E
- Country: Albania
- County: Gjirokastër
- Municipality: Tepelenë

Population (2011)
  - Administrative unit: 723
- Time zone: UTC+1 (CET)
  - Summer (DST): UTC+2 (CEST)

Lopës is a former municipality in the Gjirokastër County, southern Albania. At the 2015 local government reform it became a subdivision of the municipality Tepelenë. The population at the 2011 census was 723. The municipal unit consists of the villages Sinanaj, Matohasanaj, Dorëz, Dhëmblan and Lab Martalloz.

== Etymology ==
The etymology of Lopës is in Albanian, as it derives from the word Lopë (Albanian word for cow).
