= Tepelenë =

- Municipality
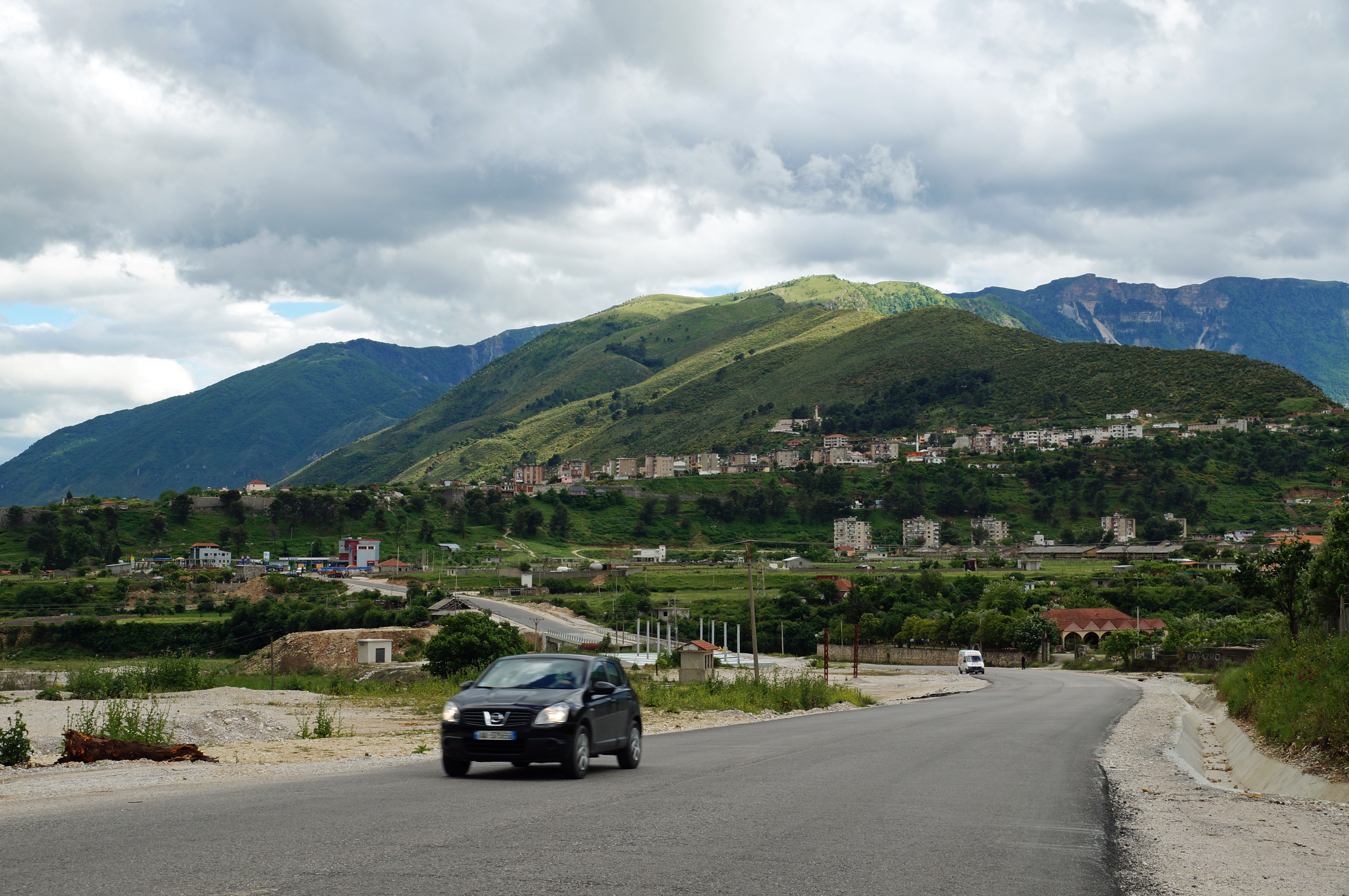

- Emblem

- Location within Albania
- Coordinates: 40°17′48″N 20°01′08″E
- Country: Albania
- County: Gjirokastër

Government
  - Mayor: Gramos Sako (PS)

Area
  - Municipality: 431.50 km^{2} (166.60 sq mi)

Population (2011)
  - Municipality: 8,949
  - Municipality density: 20.74/km^{2} (53.71/sq mi)
  - Administrative unit: 4,342
- Demonym(s): Albanian: Tepelenas (m), Tepelenase (f)
- Time zone: UTC+1 (CET)
  - Summer (DST): UTC+2 (CEST)
- Postal Code: 6301
- Area Code: (0)814
- Website: tepelena.gov.al

Tepelenë (Albanian definite form: Tepelena) is a city and a municipality in Gjirokastër County, in the south of Albania. The town is on the left bank of the Vjosa River, about three kilometres downstream from its union with the Drino.

Until the abolition of Districts in 2000, Tepelenë was the seat of the Tepelenë District. Its location is strategically important and there is a ruined citadel occupying a point 300 metres above the river. Ali Pasha of Yanina was born at the nearby village of Beçisht, and Tepelena along with Ioannina were Ali's headquarters. In 1847, the British writer Edward Lear visited the town and noted the devastated buildings.

== Name ==
The name of Tepelene has been interpreted in three variants; the first connects the origin of this name with the Turkish word "Tepedelen" which means "head-piercing". The second version explains the word with "Tepe e Lenes" which means "the hill of Lenes" and the third more convincing version is the one which explains this name with the Illyrian word "Antibylyne" which means "in front of the Bylynes". Later this word evolves and takes the name Tepelene.

== History ==
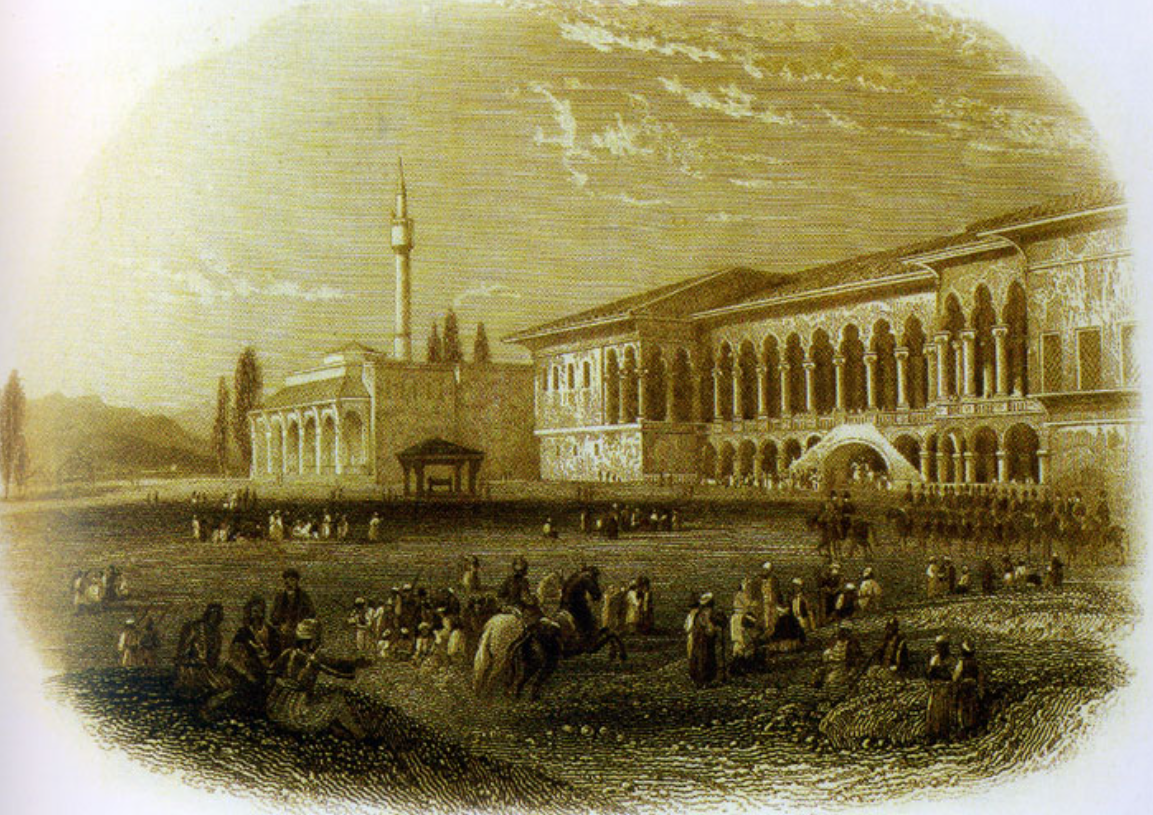
The Palace of Ali Pasha in Tepelena, engraving by Edward Finden, based on a drawing by William Purser, early 19th century.

The Byzantines built a defensive tower which was successively developed during the Ottoman Empire epoch in the 15th century and by Ali Pasha in the early 19th century.

In early July 1833 the inhabitants of Tepelenë rose in revolt against Emin Pasha.

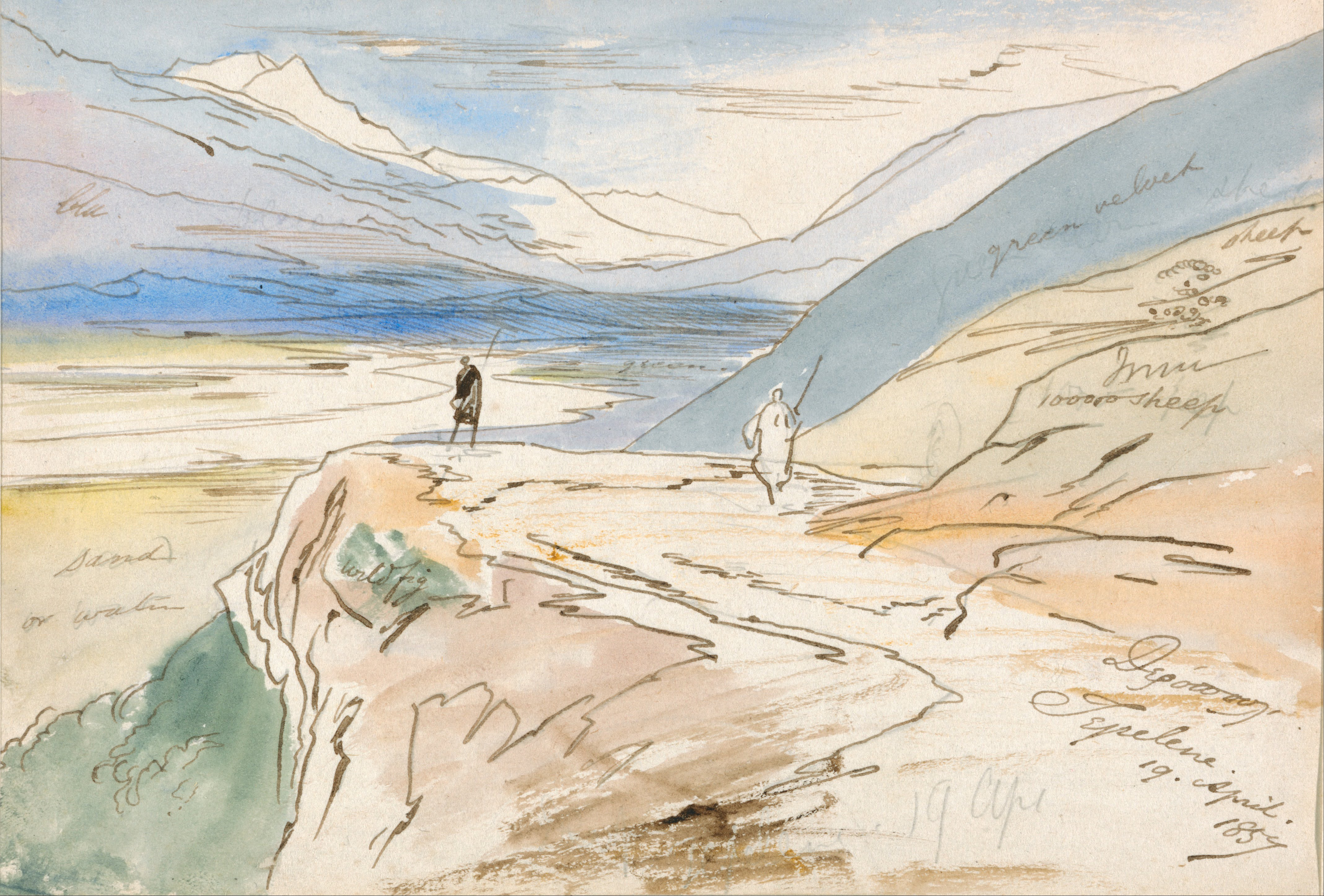
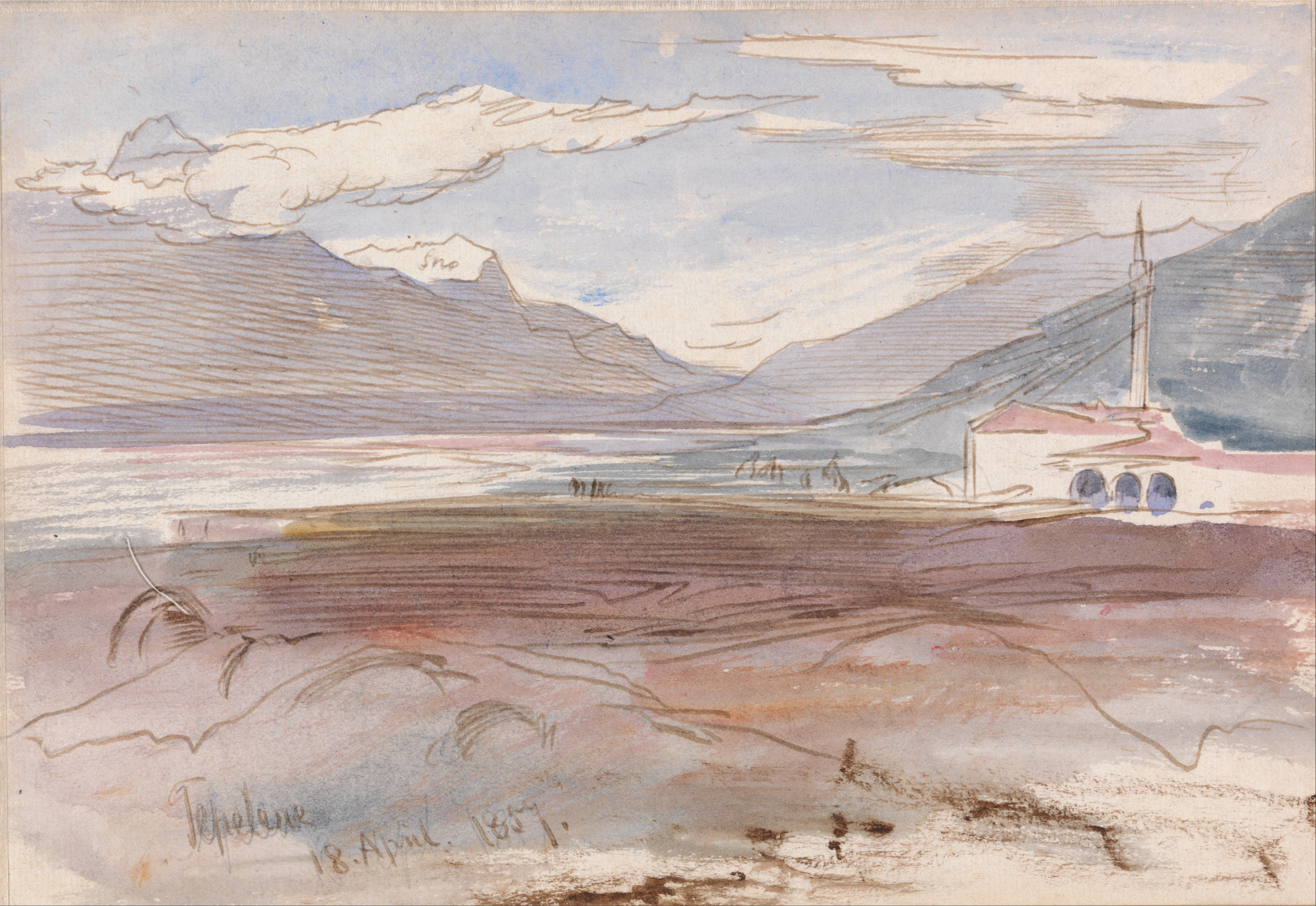

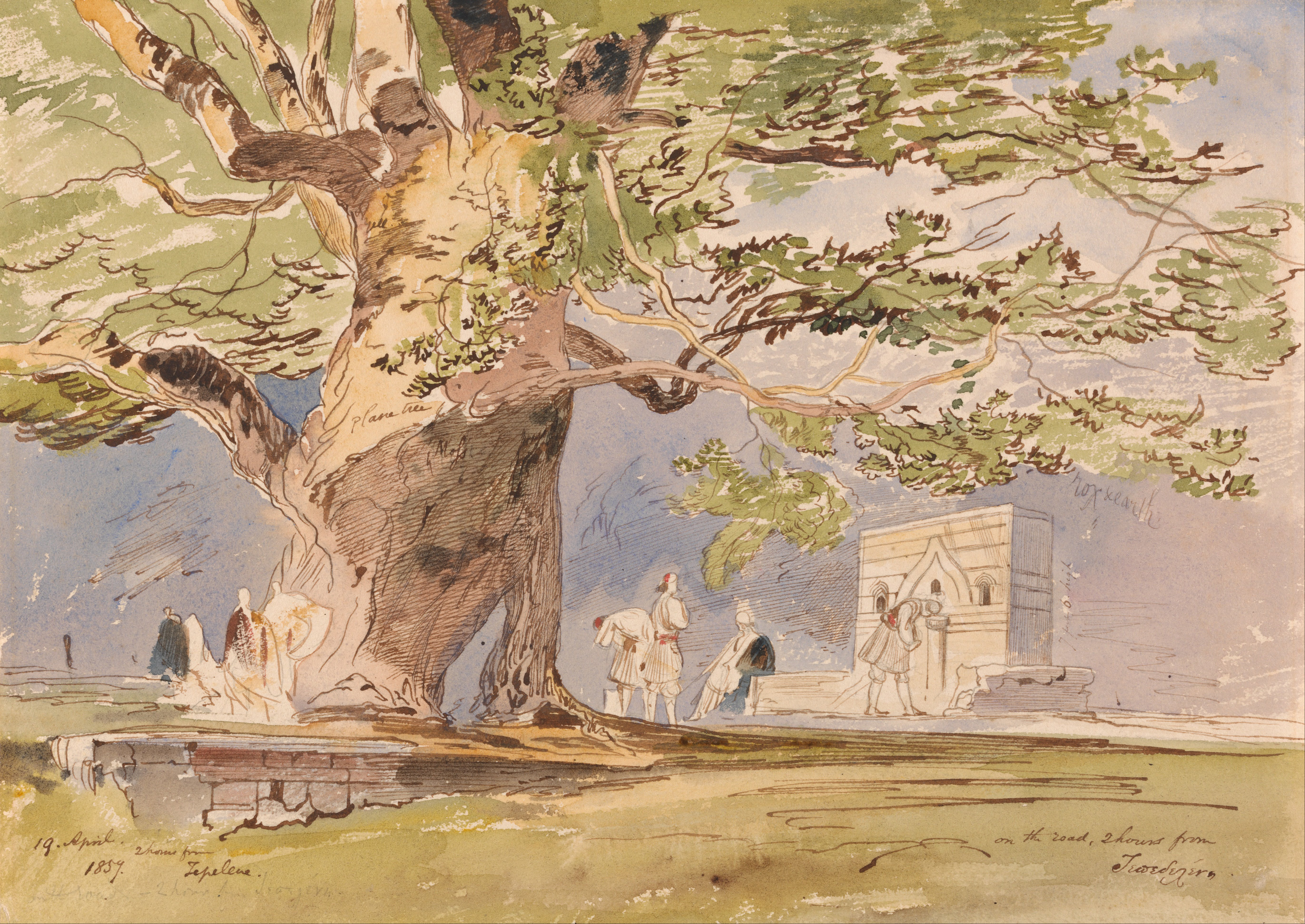
Tepelenë in April 1857 by Edward Lear.

The Young Turk revolutionaries met in Tepelenë in February 1909, in an attempt to persuade Albanian nationalists to join them.

In 1920, an earthquake severely damaged the town which was completely rebuilt afterwards. Local tradition says that if Tepelenë exceeds 100 buildings it will be destroyed. In the same year, 400 Italian soldiers surrendered to the Albanians during the Battle of Vlora.

On 7 April 1939, Italian forces landed in Albania and took control of the country and Tepelenë in the beginning of World War II. After the Italian invasion of Greece in October 1940 failed, the Albanian troops in Tepelenë under the command of Colonel Prenk Pervizi deserted the Italian army. The colonel protested by telling the Italian command that the Albanians were not cannon fodder. As a consequence, Colonel Pervizi as well as other officers and Albanian troops were transferred into the mountains of northern Albania and isolated there.

Greek forces counter-attacked and advanced towards Tepelenë in a general offensive on Vlorë. Despite several attacks and assistance for the Greeks by the British Royal Air Force, the Italians managed to hold the town and in late April 1941, following the German invasion of Yugoslavia, the Greek army was forced to withdraw.

Later, the post-war socialist government converted the local Italian army camp into a labour camp. Among those detained were influential Albanian families involved in the previous governments. Some died and their graves were unmarked. The camp was closed in 1954. At one point a cholera epidemic killed many inmates.

In the 1997 unrest in Albania, Tepelenë became a focal point for the uprising against Sali Berisha's government. A people's committee took charge of the town in March 1997 and released opposition politician Fatos Nano from the local prison. The movement spread immediately to Gjirokastër where weapons were distributed from Tepelenë.

== Geography ==
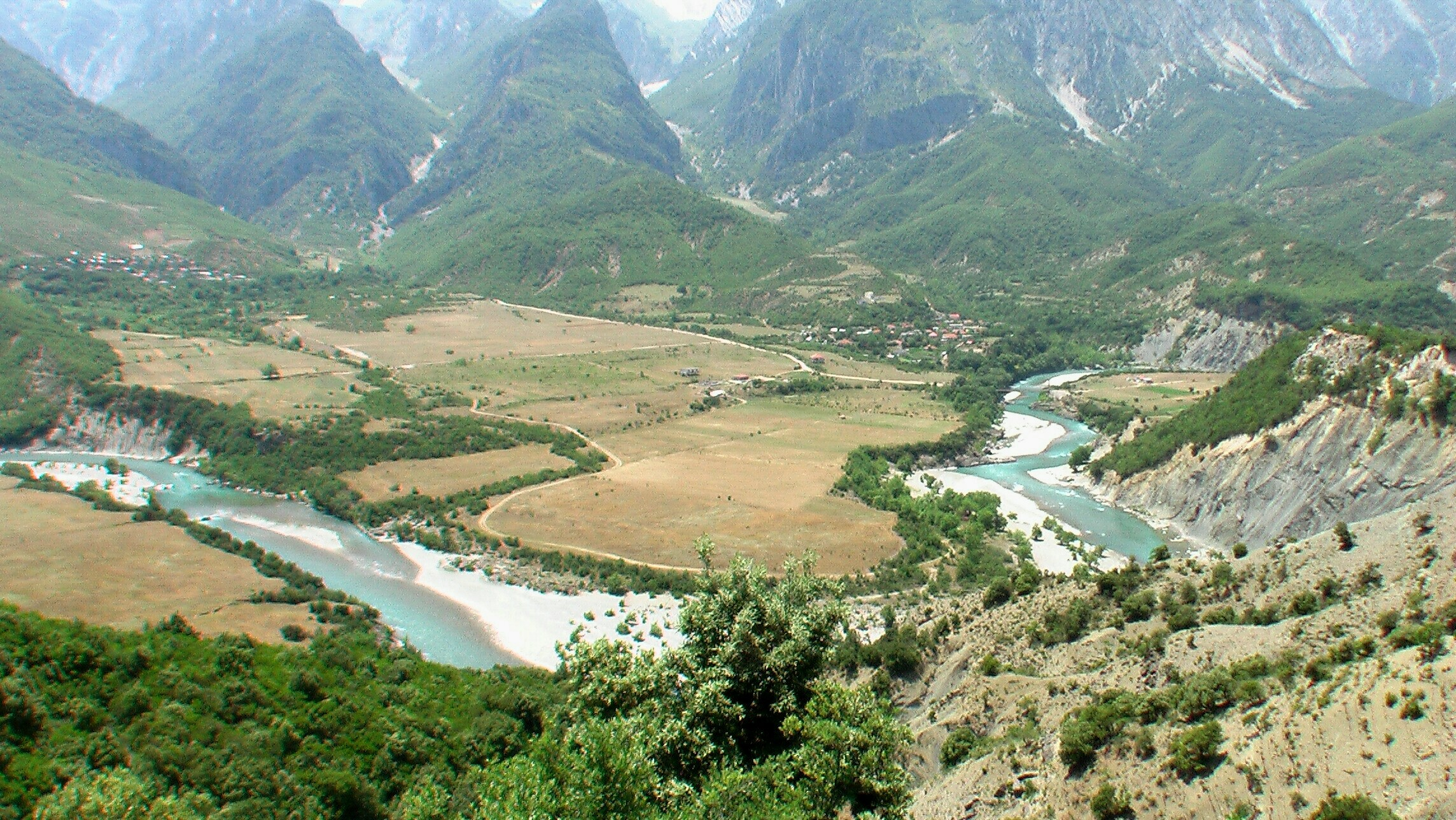
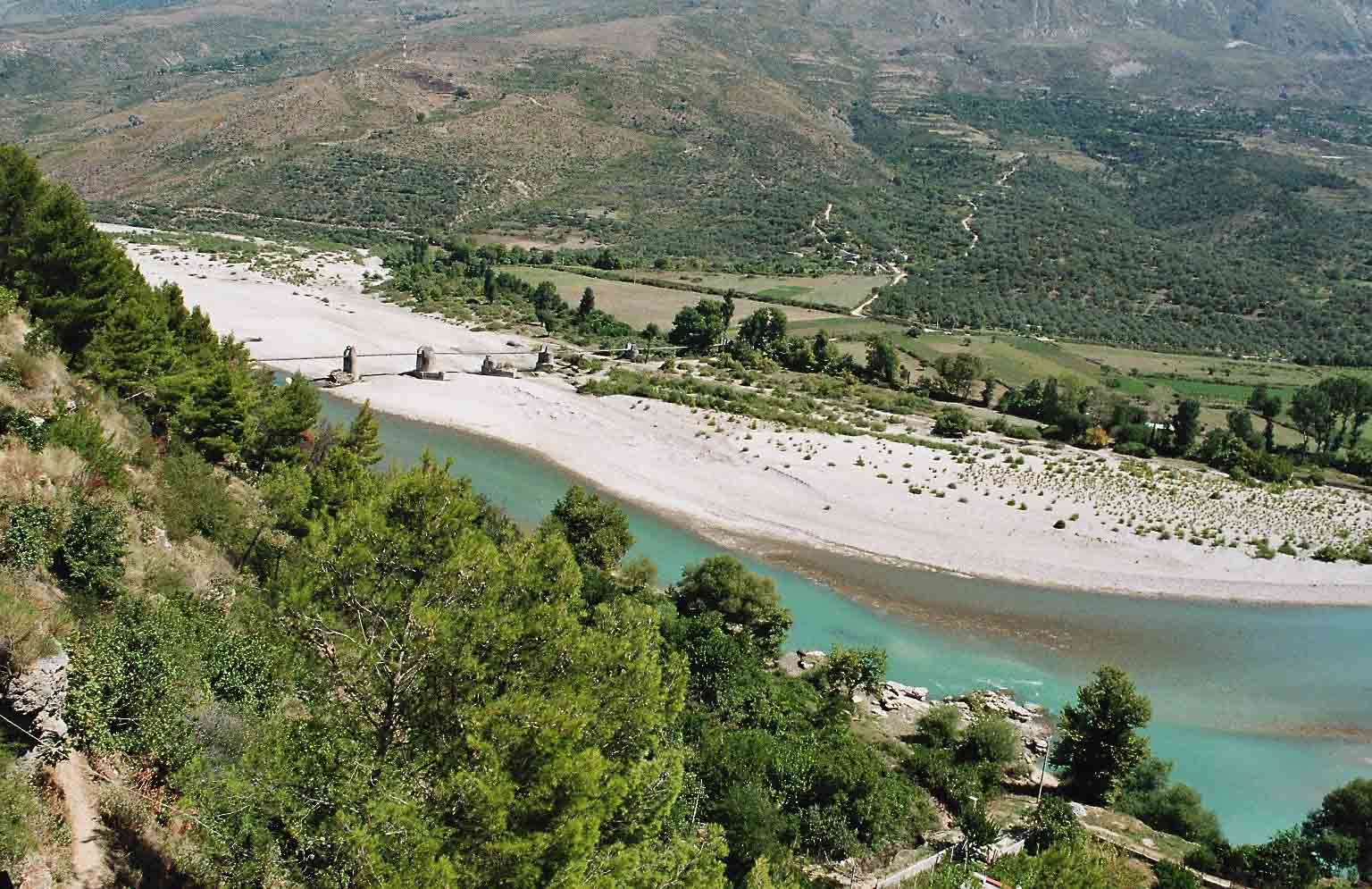
The Vjosa upstream from the city of Tepelenë.

Tepelenë is located on the left shore of the Vjosa on a plateau above the river. The river applies here, after the river has broken through a few kilometres in the Këlcyrë Gorge a mountain chain, to the North. In addition the Drino flows at this point. North of Tepelenë, the Bënça river coming from the south-west from the Kurvelesh flows into the Vjosa.

Tepelenë was formed at the 2015 local government reform by the merger of the former municipalities Kurvelesh, Lopës, Qendër Tepelenë and Tepelenë, that became municipal units. The seat of the municipality is the town Tepelenë.

== Demographics ==
The total population of the city is 8,949 (2011 census), in a total area of 431.50 km^{2}. The population of the former municipality at the 2011 census was 4,342 and completely ethnically Albanian.

== Economy ==
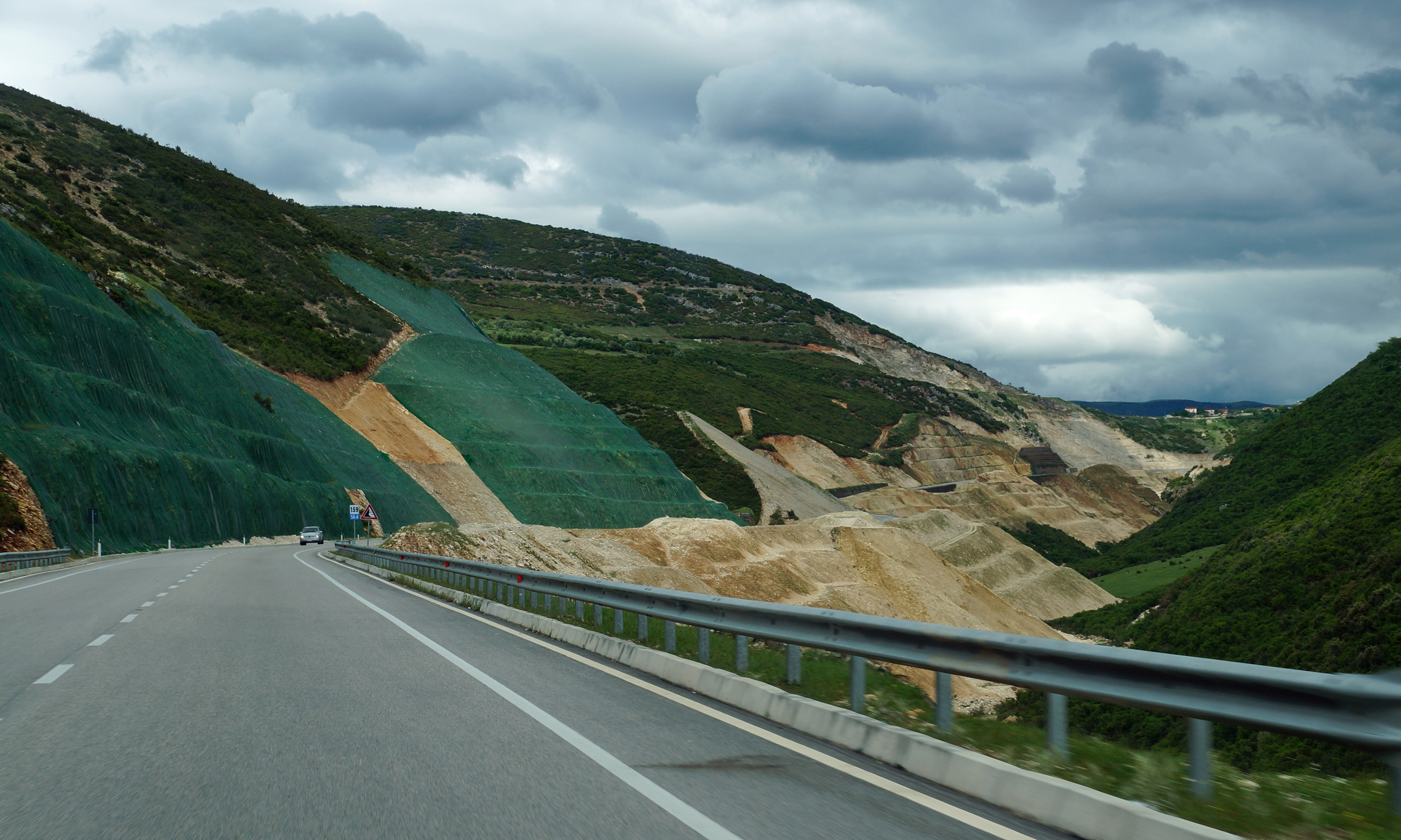
The new SH4 between Fier and Tepelenë.

The local mineral water plant is an important local enterprise.

=== Transport ===
Due to its location at the confluence of two valleys, Tepelena has always been an important traffic hub in southern Albania. The National Road 4 (SH4), from Fier to Gjirokastër, continues through Tepelenë.

== Culture ==
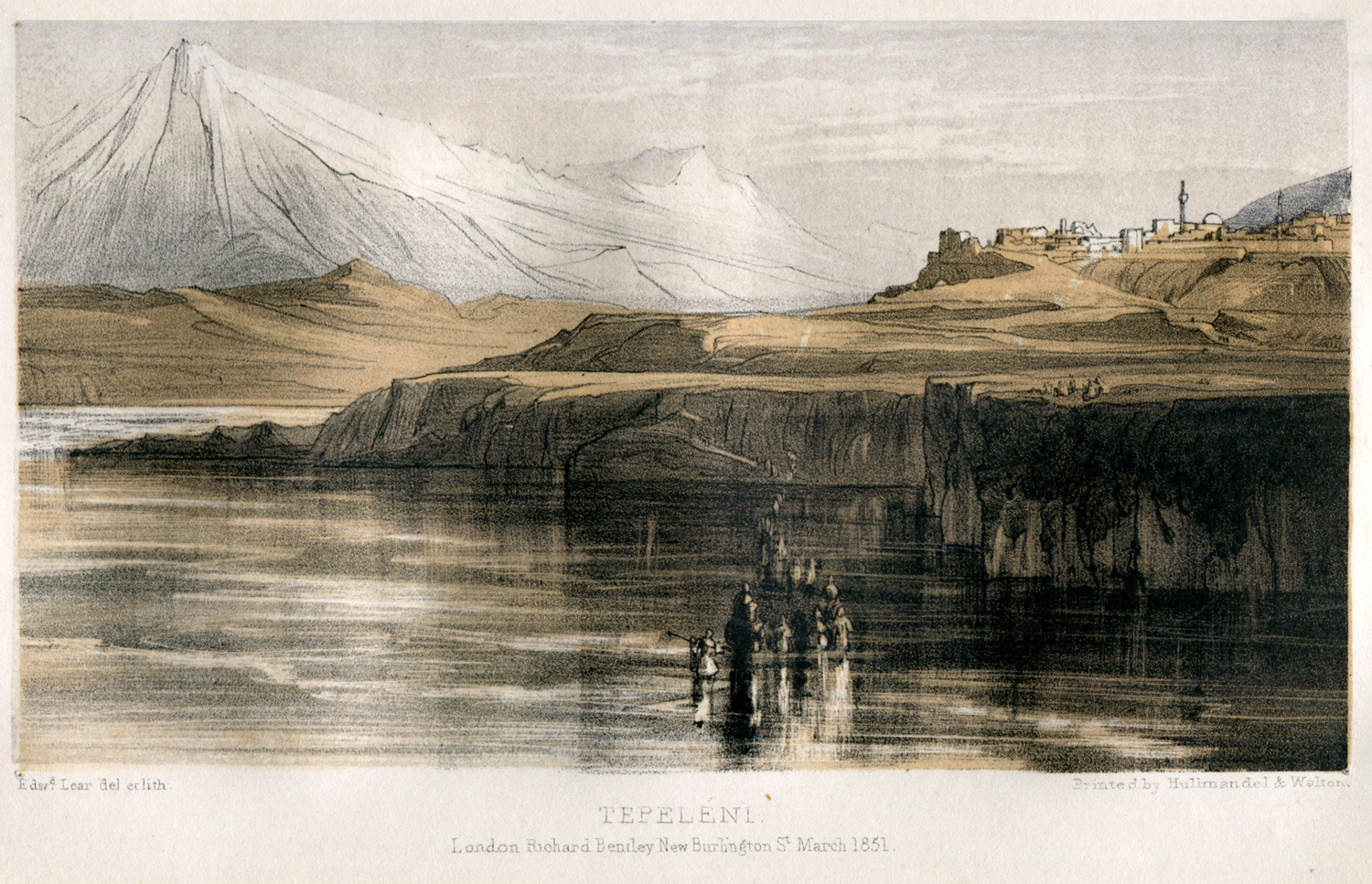
The fortress of Tepelena on the Vjosa depicted by Edward Lear in 1848.

=== Sports ===
The local football club is SK Tepelena.

=== Nature ===
In 2023, Albania declared the Vjosa river the "first wild river national park in Europe".

== Notable people ==
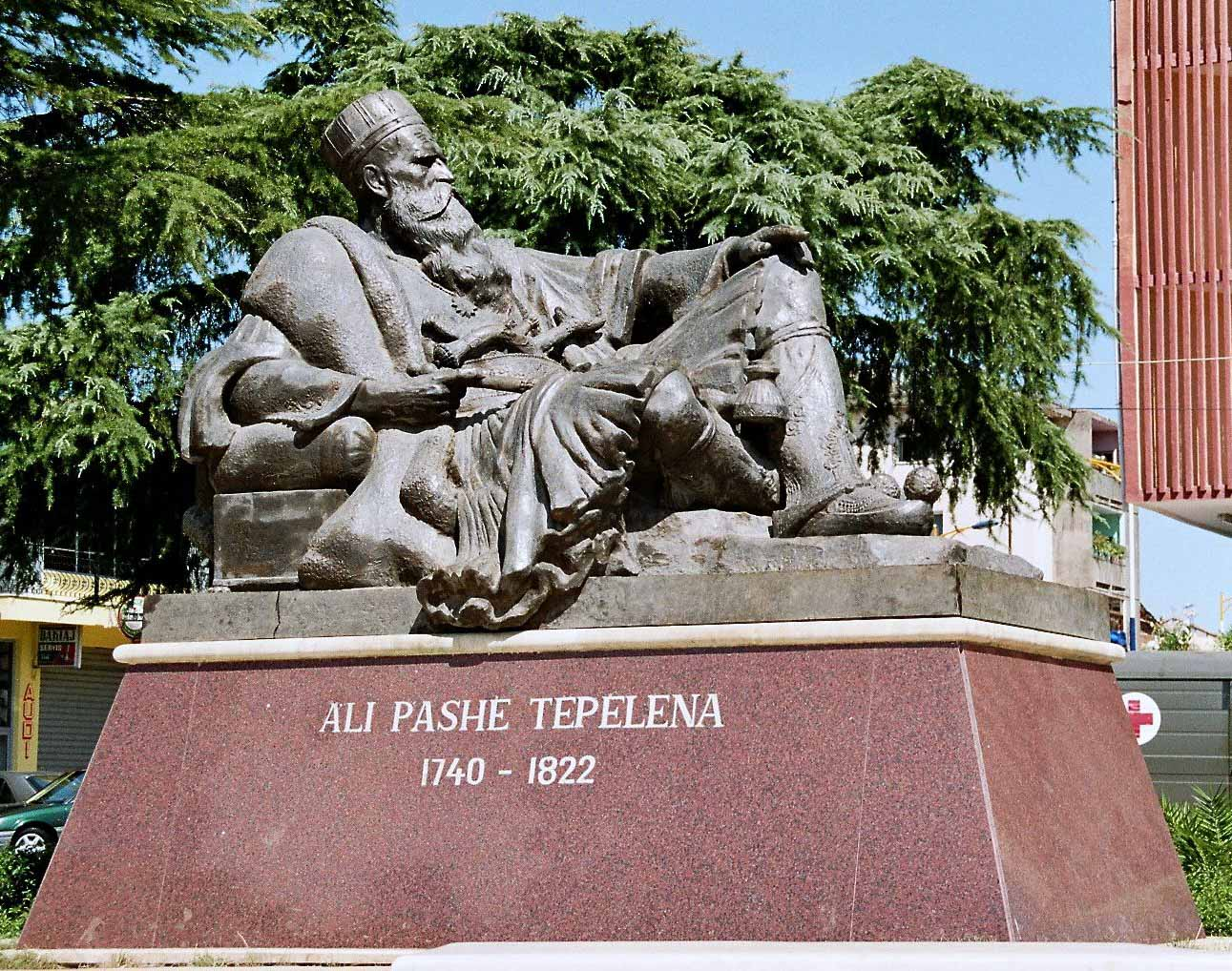
Monument of Ali Pasha.

- Ali Pasha, Albanian ruler who served as Ottoman pasha of the Pashalik of Yanina, a large part of western Rumelia.
- Foto Strakosha, soccer player Albania capped
- Muhedin Targaj, soccer player Albania capped
- Isuf Kalo, notable physician, personal doctor of Enver Hoxha
- Gramoz Ruçi, 37th Speaker of the Parliament of Albania
- Valentina Leskaj, former Minister of Work and Social Welfare
- Tafil Buzi, leader of the Albanian revolts of 1833–1839.
- Petrit Ruka, director and screenwriter
- Ylli Baka, singer and songwriter
- Zaho Balili, poet, writer and rhapsodist, author of iso-polyphonic songs.
- Maliq Lila, writer and poet
- Begator Llaci, pathologist and hepatologist.
- Big Body Bes, rapper and TV presenter
- Toquel, rapper
- Stan Dragoti, American movie director with parents from Tepelenë who migrated to America in the 1920s
- Elton Ilirjani, Albanian-American Supermodel and Businessman from Tepelenë who migrated to United States in 2018

== See also ==
- Geography of Albania
- Tourism in Albania
- History of Albania
- Tepelenë District

== Bibliography ==
- Tanner, Marcus (2014). Albania's mountain queen: Edith Durham and the Balkans. London: I.B.Tauris. ISBN 9781780768199.
- Blue Guide to Albania and Kosovo from Zoitsa Vasi, James Pettifer, A&C Black, London, 2001
- Albania in the Twentieth Century, A History: Volume I: Albania and King Zog, 1908-39 , Owen Pearson, I. B. Tauris, 2004
