= Gjirokastër County =

County in southern Albania

Gjirokastër County Qarku i Gjirokastrës (Albanian) Επαρχία Αργυροκάστρου (Greek)
- County
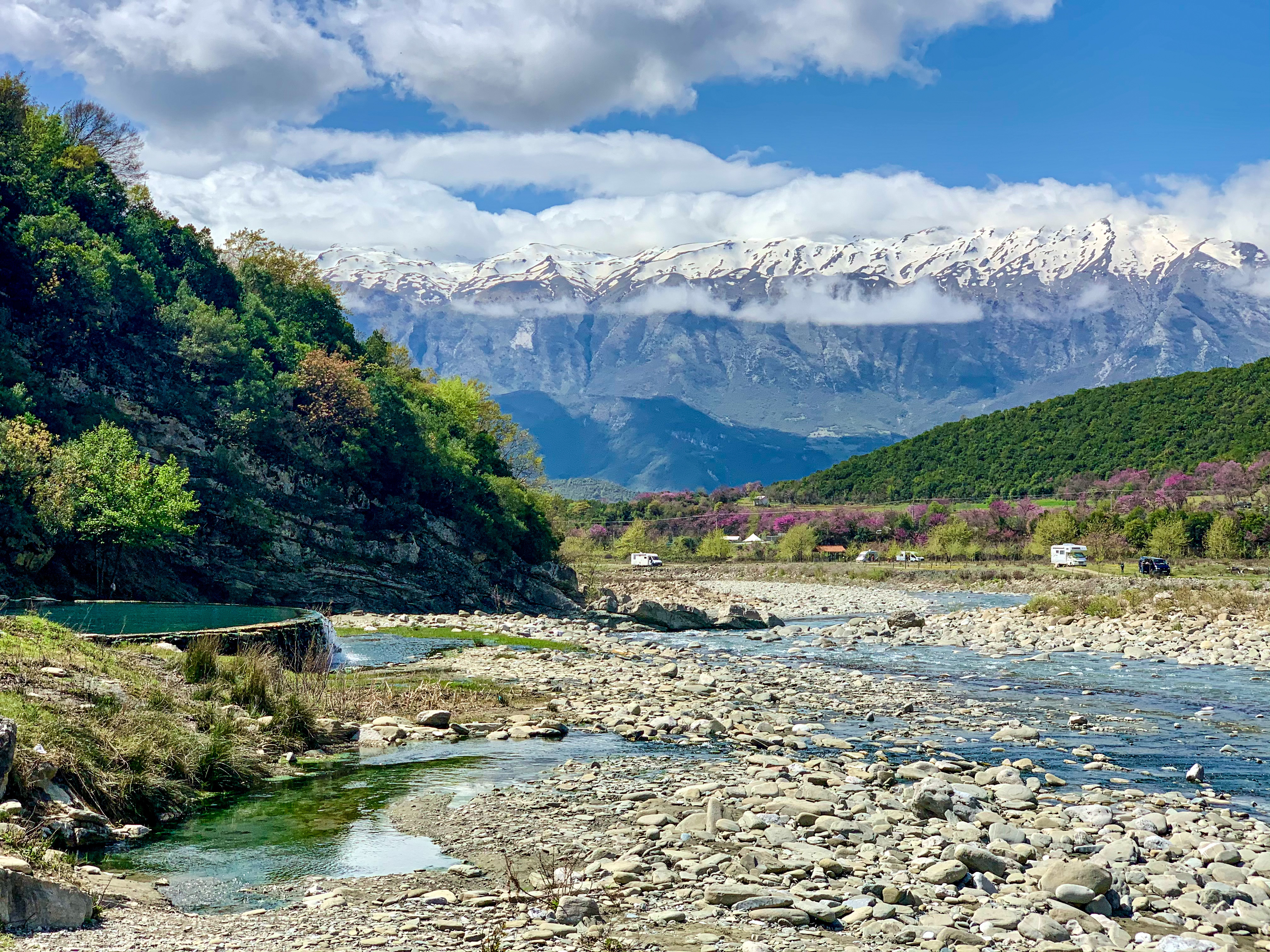
- Thermal Baths near Përmet

- Flag Emblem

- Coordinates: 40°10′N 20°10′E
- Country: Albania
- Seat: Gjirokastër
- Subdivisions: 7 municipalities, 268 towns and villages

Government
  - Council chairman: Dino Selimi

Area
  - Total: 2,884 km^{2} (1,114 sq mi)

Population (2023)
  - Total: 60,013
  - Density: 20.81/km^{2} (53.89/sq mi)
- Time zone: UTC+1 (CET)
  - Summer (DST): UTC+2 (CEST)
- HDI (2023): 0.833 very high · 4th
- NUTS Code: AL033

Gjirokastër County (Albanian: Qarku i Gjirokastrës, Greek: Επαρχία Αργυροκάστρου) is one of the 12 counties of Albania. The total population in 2023 was 60,013, in an area of 2884 km^{2}. Its capital is the city Gjirokastër.

== Administrative divisions ==
Until 2000, Gjirokastër County was subdivided into three districts: Gjirokastër, Përmet, and Tepelenë. Since the 2015 local government reform, the county consists of the following 7 municipalities: Dropull, Gjirokastër, Këlcyrë, Libohovë, Memaliaj, Përmet and Tepelenë. Before 2015, it consisted of the following 32 municipalities:

- Antigonë
- Ballaban
- Buz
- Çarshovë
- Cepo
- Dishnicë
- Dropull i Poshtëm
- Dropull i Sipërm
- Frashër
- Fshat Memaliaj
- Gjirokastër
- Këlcyrë
- Kordhocë
- Krahës
- Kurvelesh
- Lazarat
- Libohovë
- Lopës
- Luftinjë
- Lunxhëri
- Memaliaj
- Odrie
- Përmet
- Petran
- Picar
- Pogon
- Qendër Libohovë
- Qendër Piskovë
- Qendër Tepelenë
- Qesarat
- Sukë
- Tepelenë
- Zagori

The municipalities consist of about 270 towns and villages in total. See Villages of Gjirokastër County for a structured list.

== Demographics ==
Historical population
| Year | Pop. | ±% |
|---|---|---|
| 1960 | 96,805 | — |
| 1969 | 115,414 | +19.2% |
| 1979 | 134,137 | +16.2% |
| 1989 | 155,998 | +16.3% |
| 2001 | 112,831 | −27.7% |
| 2011 | 72,176 | −36.0% |
| 2023 | 60,013 | −16.9% |

According to the last national census from 2023 this county has 60,013 inhabitants. Ethnic groups in the county include Albanians, Greeks, Aromanians, Romani, and Balkan Egyptians. In the 2023 census Gjirokastër's was predominantly Albanian, accounting for 82.7% of the residents. The Greek community follows, making up 14.2% of the population. Smaller ethnic groups include Egyptians (0.3%), Romani (0.3%), and Bulgarians (0.1%). There are also minor groups such as Bosniaks (0.02%), Aromanians (0.3%), Macedonians (0.02%), Serbs (0.03%), and Montenegrins (0.02%). Additionally, 0.1% of the population identifies as mixed ethnicity. A small proportion, 0.01%, reported having no ethnicity, while 0.6% preferred not to answer, and 1.1% had unavailable or missing data.

Ethnicities in Gjirokastër County according to the 2023 census
| Ethnic and cultural affiliation | Resident population | Percentage of resident population |
|---|---|---|
| Albanians | 49,603 | 82.7% |
| Greeks | 8,552 | 14.2% |
| Egyptians | 177 | 0.3% |
| Romani | 192 | 0.3% |
| Bulgarians | 43 | 0.1% |
| Bosniaks | 9 | 0.02% |
| Aromanians | 206 | 0.3% |
| Macedonians | 10 | 0.02% |
| Serbs | 21 | 0.03% |
| Montenegrins | 12 | 0.02% |
| Others | 69 | 0.1% |
| Mixed | 83 | 0.1% |
| None | 7 | 0.01% |
| Prefer not to answer | 353 | 0.6% |
| Not available | 676 | 1.1% |

=== Religion ===
In Gjirokastër, the religious affiliation is both diverse and secular, with various communities practicing different faiths alongside a significant portion identifying as non-religious. Overall, 62.16% of residents identified with a religion.

Between 2011 and 2023, the population decreased from 72,176 to 60,013, with notable shifts in religious affiliation. Between the 2011 and 2023 censuses, the religious composition shifted significantly. The Sunni Muslim population dropped sharply from 38.5% to 14.4%, while the Bektashi Muslim community grew from 8.5% to 21.0%. The Catholic population decreased slightly from 2.1% to 1.2%, and Orthodox Christians saw an increase from 17.4% to 25.3%. Evangelical Christians also experienced modest growth, rising from 0.08% to 0.26%.

In contrast, the non-religious population expanded considerably. Atheists grew from 6.3% to 7.3%, making Gjirokastër home to the second-highest share of atheists in Albania. Meanwhile, believers without denomination rose from 8.4% to 14.4%.

Population of Gjirokastër according to religious group (2011–2023)
| Religion group | Census 2011 | | Census 2023 | | Difference (2023−2011) | |
| Religion group | Number | Percentage | Number | Percentage | Number | Percentage |
|---|---|---|---|---|---|---|
| Sunni Muslim | 27,815 | 38.54% | 8,643 | 14.40% | -19,172 | -24.14% |
| Bektashi Muslim | 6,118 | 8.48% | 12,627 | 21.04% | +6,509 | +12.56% |
| Muslim | 33,933 | 47.02% | 21,270 | 35.44% | -12,663 | -11.58% |
| Catholic Christian | 1,493 | 2.07% | 713 | 1.19% | -780 | -0.88% |
| Orthodox Christian | 12,583 | 17.44% | 15,195 | 25.32% | +2,612 | +7.88% |
| Evangelical | 59 | 0.08% | 154 | 0.26% | +95 | +0.18% |
| Christian | 14,135 | 19.6% | 16,062 | 26.77% | +1,927 | +7.17% |
| Atheists | 4,550 | 6.30% | 4,372 | 7.28% | -178 | +0.98% |
| Believers without denomination | 6,050 | 8.38% | 8,616 | 14.36% | +2,566 | +5.98% |
| Non-religious | 10,600 | 14.68% | 12,988 | 21.64% | +2,388 | +6.96% |
| Not stated / other | 13,406 | 18.58% | 9,573 | 15.95% | -3,833 | -2.63% |
| TOTAL | 72,176 | 100% | 60,013 | 100% | -12,163 | - |

== Notable people ==
- Ali Pasha of Tepelenë
- Enver Hoxha
- Ismail Kadare
- Stath Melani
- Evangelos Zappas
- Agron Llakaj
