= Shehu III Government =

Government of the People's Republic of Albania

Third cabinet of Mehmet Shehu Shehu III Government
- 42nd Cabinet of Albania

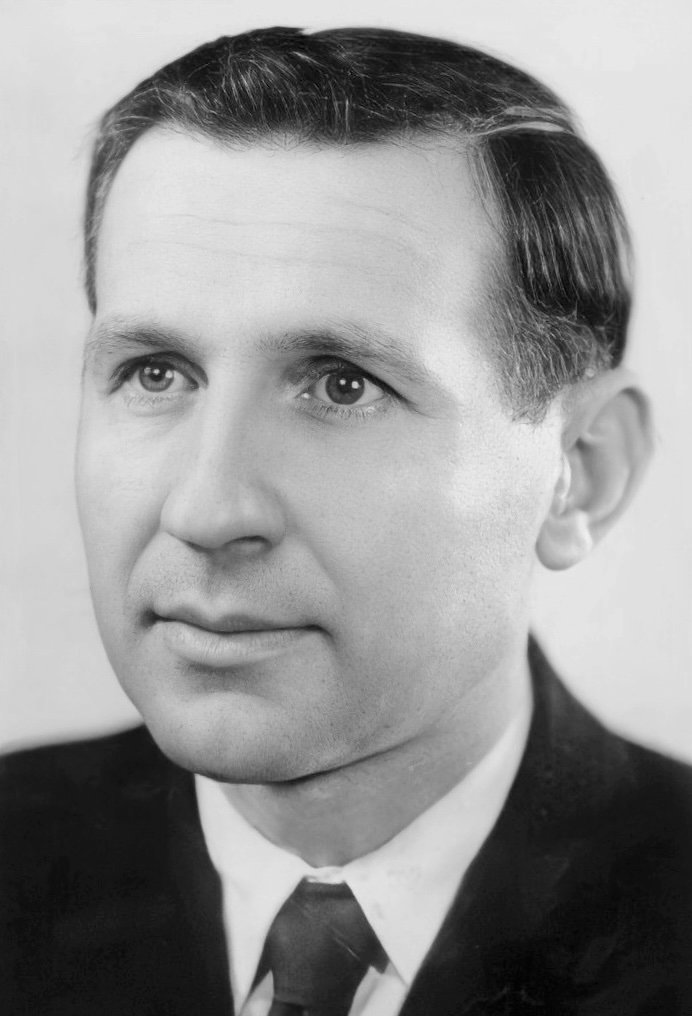
- Date formed: 16 July 1962
- Date dissolved: 14 July 1966

People and organisations
- Head of state: De jure: Haxhi Lleshi, De facto: Enver Hoxha
- Head of government: Mehmet Shehu
- No. of ministers: 21
- Member party: Party of Labour of Albania

History
- Election: 1962 Albanian parliamentary election
- Outgoing election: 1966 Albanian parliamentary election
- Predecessor: Shehu II
- Successor: Shehu IV

The Shehu III Government was a government of the Socialist People's Republic of Albania, formed on July 16, 1962, by Prime Minister Mehmet Shehu of the Party of Labour of Albania (PPSh). It succeeded the Shehu II Government and remained in office until July 14, 1966, when it was replaced by the Shehu IV Government.

The cabinet restructuring followed the parliamentary elections on June 3, 1962. There was a significant expansion of the Council of Ministers, including up to three First Deputy Chairmen and – excluding Beqir Balluku's dual role – up to three Deputy Chairmen. Gogo Nushi was the only member from the previous government who did not continue, but he retained significant roles, including in the Trade Union Federation Bashkimi Sindikal i Shqipërisë. Thus, the break with the Soviet Union in 1961 and the approach to China had no impact on the government of Albania.

The cabinet underwent several changes:

- On January 1, 1965, the Ministry of Industry, Mining, and Geology was divided into an Ministry of Industry under Koço Theodhosi (already a Deputy Chairman of the Council of Ministers) and a Ministry of Agriculture under Pirro Dodbiba.
- Simultaneously, Abdyl Këllezi was appointed as the third First Deputy Chairman of the Council of Ministers; Adil Çarçani, the former Minister of Industry, Mining, and Geology, became the third Deputy Chairman of the Council of Ministers, succeeding Manush Myftiu, who had been treated abroad for an illness in 1963. Fadil Paçrami succeeded him as the Minister of Education and Culture.
- On January 1, 1966, Kiço Ngjela was appointed as the new Minister of Foreign Trade.
- Simultaneously, Abdyl Këllezi had to relinquish his position as the First Deputy Chairman of the Council of Ministers; he became the Chairman of the State Planning Commission and a member of the successor government in 1968.
- A major reshuffle took place on March 18, 1966:
  - The remaining two First Deputy Chairmen of the Council of Ministers lost their positions: Beqir Balluku became the new Deputy Chairman of the Council of Ministers, Spiro Koleka replaced Koço Theodhosi as the Chairman of the State Planning Commission.
  - Haki Toska became a new member of the government as the Deputy Chairman of the Council of Ministers. Koço Theodhosi, who had been appointed as the Minister of Industry earlier in the year, retained his position in the government. Therefore, the Deputy Chairmen of the Council of Ministers in the last four months of Cabinet Shehu III were Balluku, Toska, and Çarçani.
  - At the Ministry of Foreign Affairs, Behar Shtylla was succeeded by Nesti Nase.
  - In the Ministry of Education and Culture, Thoma Deliana replaced Fadil Paçrami, who had been appointed the previous year.

After the rupture with Moscow in 1961, the new Shehu government had to deal with a new reality: the massive support from the Soviet Union and other communist states had ceased, and Albania was politically isolated.

Cabinet Members
Position	Incumbent	Start of Term	End of Term
Chairman of the Council of Ministers	Mehmet Shehu	July 14, 1962	July 14, 1966
First Deputy Chairman of the Council of Ministers	Beqir Balluku	July 16, 1962	March 18, 1966
First Deputy Chairman of the Council of Ministers	Spiro Koleka	July 16, 1962	March 18, 1966
First Deputy Chairman of the Council of Ministers	Abdyl Këllezi	January 1, 1965	January 1, 1966
Deputy Chairman of the Council of Ministers	Beqir Balluku	March 18, 1966	July 14, 1966
Deputy Chairman of the Council of Ministers	Haki Toska	March 18, 1966	July 14, 1966
Deputy Chairman of the Council of Ministers	Manush Myftiu	July 16, 1962	January 1, 1965
Deputy Chairman of the Council of Ministers	Adil Çarçani	January 1, 1965	July 14, 1966
Deputy Chairman of the Council of Ministers	Koço Theodhosi	July 16, 1962	March 18, 1966
Minister of the Interior	Kadri Hazbiu	July 16, 1962	July 14, 1966
Chairman of the State Planning Commission	Koço Theodhosi; Spiro Koleka	July 16, 1962; March 18, 1966	March 18, 1966; July 14, 1966
Minister of People's Defense	Beqir Balluku	July 16, 1962	July 14, 1966
Minister of Foreign Affairs	Behar Shtylla; Nesti Nase	July 16, 1962; March 18, 1966	March 18, 1966; July 14, 1966
Minister of Industry, Mining, and Geology	Adil Çarçani	July 16, 1962	January 1, 1965
Minister of Industry	Koço Theodhosi	January 1, 1965	July 14, 1966
Minister of Communications	Milo Qirko	July 16, 1962	July 14, 1966
Minister of Education and Culture	Manush Myftiu; Fadil Paçrami; Thoma Deliana	July 16, 1962; January 1, 1965; March 18, 1966	January 1, 1965; March 18, 1966; July 14, 1966
Minister of Finance	Aleks Verli	July 16, 1962	July 14, 1966
Minister of Justice	Bilbil Klosi	July 16, 1962	July 14, 1966
Minister of Foreign Trade	Kiço Ngjela	January 1, 1966	July 14, 1966
Minister of Agriculture	Pirro Dodbiba	January 1, 1965	July 14, 1966

Preceded by Shehu II	Government of Albania; 1962–1966	Succeeded by Shehu IV
