= Shehu IV Government =

Albanian government

Fourth cabinet of Mehmet Shehu Shehu IV Government
- 43rd Cabinet of Albania

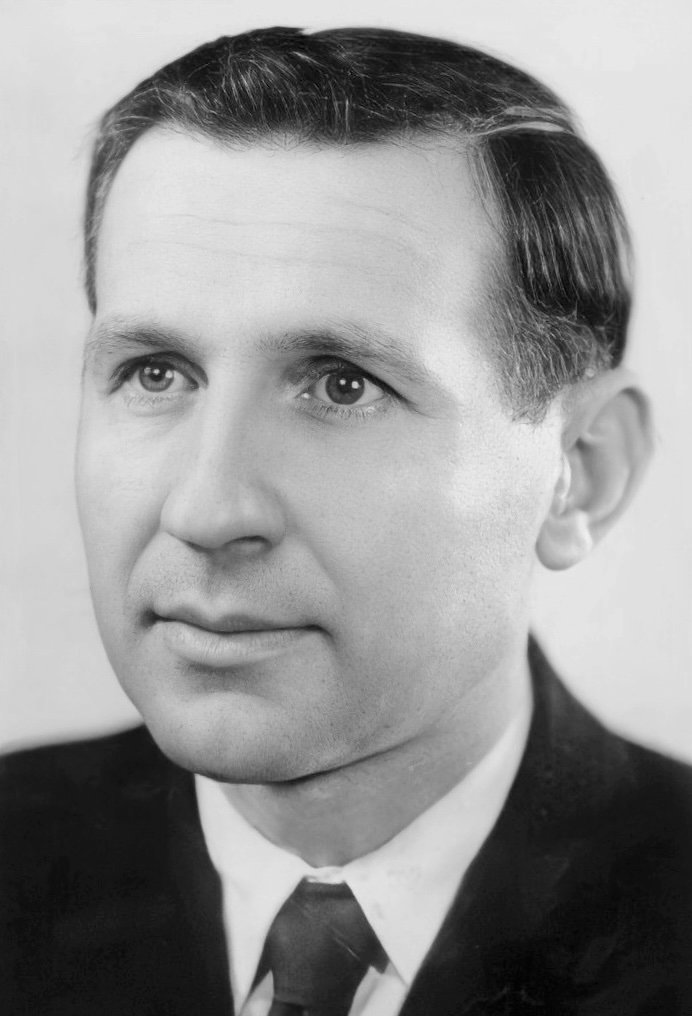
- Date formed: 14 July 1966
- Date dissolved: 20 November 1970

People and organisations
- Head of state: De jure: Haxhi Lleshi, De facto: Enver Hoxha
- Head of government: Mehmet Shehu
- No. of ministers: 16
- Member party: Party of Labour of Albania

History
- Election: 1966 Albanian parliamentary election
- Outgoing election: 1970 Albanian parliamentary election
- Predecessor: Shehu III
- Successor: Shehu V Government

The Fourth Shehu government was a government of the Socialist People's Republic of Albania, which was founded on July 14, 1966 by Prime Minister Mehmet Shehu. the Party of Labor of Albania (Albanian: Partia e Punës e Shqipërisë) was formed. It replaced the third government of Mehmet Shehu and remained in office until November 20, 1970, when it was succeeded by the fifth government of Mehmet Shehu.

The government reshuffle followed the election for the Kuvendi i Shqipërisë on July 10, 1966. All ministers already belonged to the previous cabinet. Several office changes had already taken place by this time: As of January 1, 1965, the Ministry of Industry, Mining and Geology was split up into separate ministries; in the first months of 1966, the offices of the first deputy chairmen of the Council of Ministers were dissolved and the number of deputy chairmen of the Council of Ministers was reduced. The structure of the cabinet remained stable over the four-year term.

Cabinet members
Government office	Official	Start of term	End of term	Ref.
Chairman of the Council of Ministers	Mehmet Shehu	July 14, 1966	November 20, 1970	
First Deputy Chairman of the Council of Ministers	Beqir Balluku	July 14, 1966	November 20, 1970	
Deputy Chairman of the Council of Ministers	Haki Toska	July 14, 1966	November 20, 1970	
Deputy Chairman of the Council of Ministers	Adil Çarçani	July 14, 1966	November 20, 1970	
Deputy Chairman of the Council of Ministers	Spiro Koleka	July 14, 1966	November 20, 1970	
Minister of People's Defense	Beqir Balluku	14. July 1966	20. November 1970	
Innenminister	Kadri Hazbiu	14. July 1966	20. November 1970	
Chairman of the State Planning Commission	Spiro Koleka; Abdyl Këllezi	July 14, 1966; 1. January 1968	January 1, 1968; 20. November 1970	
Foreign Ministers	Nesti Nase	July 14, 1966	November 20, 1970	
Minister of the Interior	Koço Theodhosi	14. July 1966	20. November 1970	
Minister of Communications	Milo Qirko	14. July 1966	20. November 1970	
Minister of Education and Culture	Thoma Deliana	July 14, 1966	November 20, 1970	
Minister of Finance	Aleks Verli	July 14, 1966	November 20, 1970	
Minister of Justice	Bilbil Klosi	July 14, 1966	September 14, 1966	
Minister of Foreign Trade	Kiço Ngjela	14. July 1966	20. November 1970	
Minister of Agriculture	Pirro Dodbiba	14. July 1966	20. November 1970	

Preceded by Shehu III	Government of Albania; 1966–1970	Succeeded by Shehu V
