= Shehu I Government =

Government of the People's Republic of Albania

First cabinet of Mehmet Shehu Shehu I Government
- 40th Cabinet of Albania

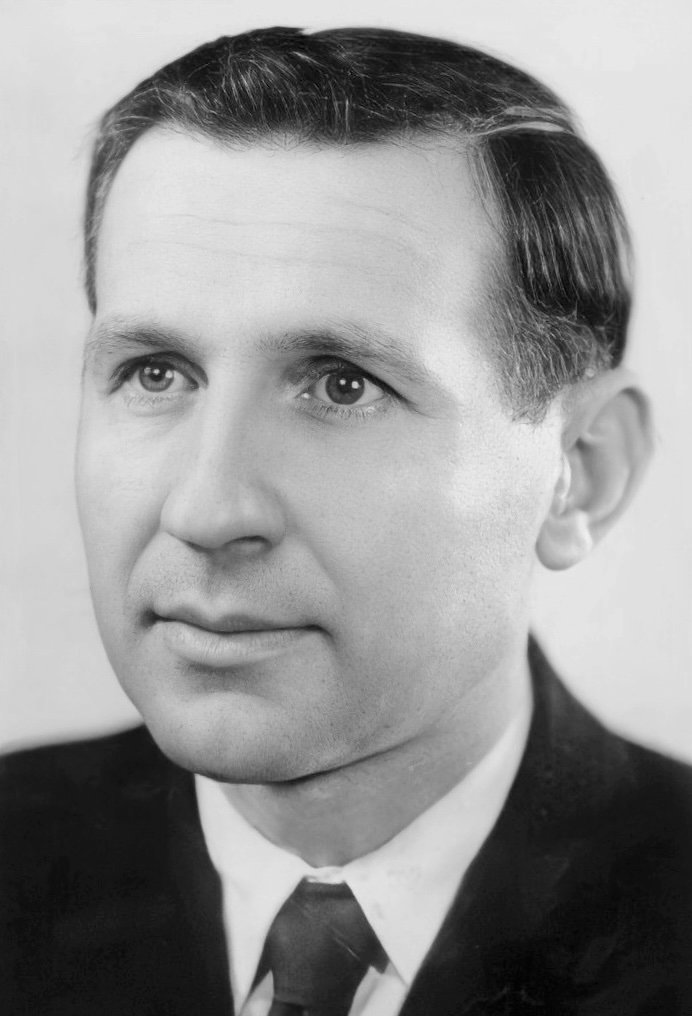
- Date formed: 20 July 1954
- Date dissolved: 1 June 1958

People and organisations
- Head of government: Mehmet Shehu
- No. of ministers: 15

History
- Predecessor: Hoxha III
- Successor: Shehu II

The government consisted of:

| Portfolio | Minister | Took office | Left office | Party |
|---|---|---|---|---|
| Chairman of the Council of Ministers | Mehmet Shehu | July 20, 1954 | June 21, 1958 | PPSh |
| First Deputy Chairman of the Council of Ministers | Spiro Koleka | June 4, 1956 | June 21, 1958 | PPSh |
| Deputy Chairmen of the Council of Ministers | Hysni Kapo | July 23, 1954 | June 4, 1956 | PPSh |
| Deputy Chairmen of the Council of Ministers | Beqir Balluku | July 23, 1954 | June 21, 1958 | PPSh |
| Deputy Chairmen of the Council of Ministers | Gogo Nushi | June 4, 1956 | June 21, 1958 | PPSh |
| Ministry of Agriculture and Rural Development | Hysni Kapo | July 20, 1954 | June 5, 1955 | PPSh |
| Ministry of Agriculture and Rural Development | Maqo Çomo | June 6, 1955 | June 1, 1958 | PPSh |
| Minister of People's Defense | Beqir Balluku | July 20, 1954 | June 1, 1958 | PPSh |
| Minister of Education and Culture | Bedri Spahiu | July 23, 1954 | 1955 | PPSh |
| Minister of Education and Culture | Ramiz Alia | 1955 | June 21, 1958 | PPSh |
| Minister of Finance | Abdyl Këllezi | July 20, 1954 | June 1, 1958 | PPSh |
| Minister of Foreign Affairs | Behar Shtylla | July 20, 1954 | June 1, 1958 | PPSh |
| Minister of the Interior | Kadri Hazbiu | July 20, 1954 | June 1, 1958 | PPSh |
| Ministry of Health and Social Protection | Medar Shtylla | July 20, 1954 | June 5, 1955 | PPSh |
| Ministry of Health and Social Protection | Ibrahim Dervishi | June 6, 1955 | September 24, 1956 | PPSh |
| Ministry of Health and Social Protection | Manush Myftiu | September 25, 1956 | February 6, 1958 | PPSh |
| Ministry of Health and Social Protection | Taqi Skëndi | February 7, 1958 | June 1, 1958 | PPSh |
| Minister of Justice | Bilbil Klosi | July 20, 1954 | June 1, 1958 | PPSh |
| Chairman of the State Planning Commission | Spiro Koleka | July 23, 1954 | June 21, 1958 | PPSh |

== See also ==
- History of Albania
- Party of Labour of Albania

| Preceded by Hoxha III | Government of Albania; 1954–1958 | Succeeded by Shehu II |
