= Shehu II Government =

Government of the People's Republic of Albania

Second cabinet of Mehmet Shehu Shehu II Government
- 41st Cabinet of Albania

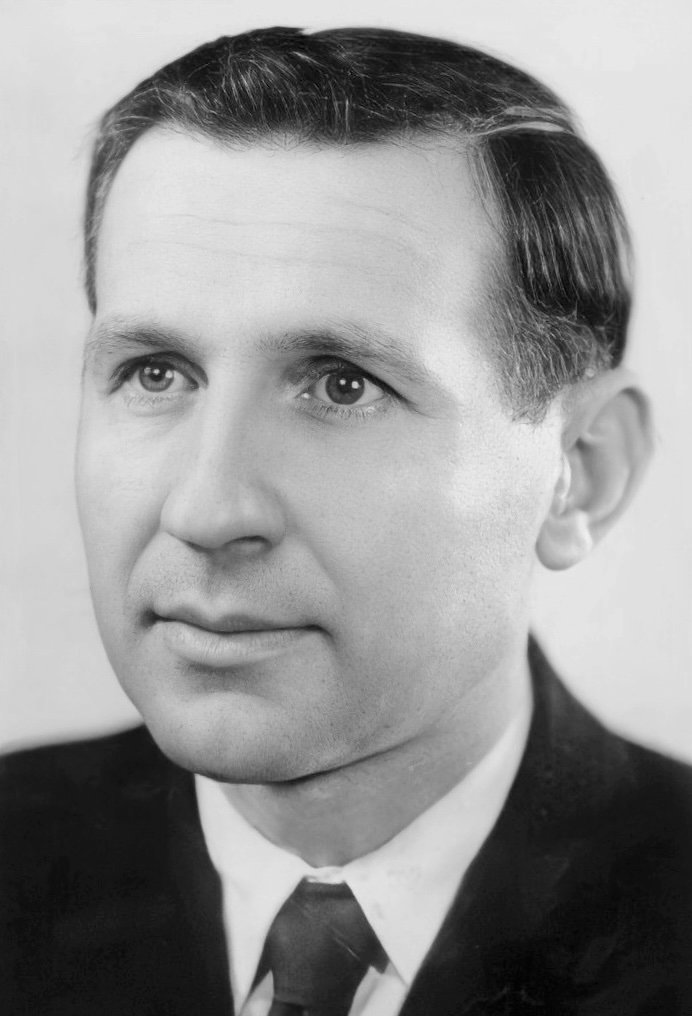
- Date formed: 22 June 1958
- Date dissolved: 13 July 1962

People and organisations
- Head of government: Mehmet Shehu
- No. of ministers: 15

History
- Predecessor: Shehu I
- Successor: Shehu III

Mehmet Shehu was Chairman of the Council of Ministers of the People's Republic of Albania from 1954 to 1976, and then Chairman of the Council of Ministers of the People's Socialist Republic of Albania from 1976 to 1981. The Shehu II Cabinet was the government of the People's Republic of Albania, formed on June 22, 1958, by Prime Minister Mehmet Shehu. the Party of Labor of Albania PPSh (Partia e Punës e Shqipërisë) was formed. It replaced the first government of Mehmet Shehu and remained in office until July 13, 1962, whereupon it was succeeded by the third government of Mehmet Shehu.

The government reshuffle followed Parliamentary elections and did not result in any significant changes. The most prominent change was the resignation of Hysni Kapo from the government, previously Deputy Chairman of the Council of Ministers and Minister of Agriculture. Kapo was referred to as "number three" in the state and from then on was only in the Politburo and in the Secretariat of the Central Committee, which he had been a member of since the Party Congress from 1956 belonged. Ramiz Alia, Hoxha's successor after his death, also left the government: he became chairman of the Foreign Affairs Commission of the People's Assembly (Kuvendi Popullor). Koço Theodhosi also replaced the chairman of the State Planning Commission Spiro Koleka, who remained First Deputy Chairman of the Council of Ministers. Health Minister Manush Myftiu took over the Ministry of Education and Culture from Alia and became a Deputy Chairman of the Council of Ministers. Gogo Nushi lost the role of Deputy Chairman but remained Minister of Trade and Communications. New to the government was Adil Çarçani, later Prime Minister, who served as Minister for Industry, Mines and Geology.

The break with Moscow and the termination of diplomatic relations with the Soviet Union in 1961 occurred during the government's time.

Portfolio	Minister	Took office	Left office	Party
Chairman of the Council of Ministers	Mehmet Shehu	June 22, 1958	July 13, 1962	PPSh
First Deputy Chairman of the Council of Ministers	Spiro Koleka	June 22, 1958	July 13, 1962	PPSh
Deputy Chairmen of the Council of Ministers	Beqir Balluku	June 22, 1958	July 13, 1962	PPSh
Deputy Chairmen of the Council of Ministers	Manush Myftiu	June 22, 1958	July 13, 1962	PPSh
Minister of People's Defense	Beqir Balluku	June 22, 1958	July 13, 1962	PPSh
Minister of Education and Culture	Manush Myftiu	June 22, 1958	July 13, 1962	PPSh
Minister of Foreign Affairs	Behar Shtylla	June 22, 1958	July 13, 1962	PPSh
Minister of the Interior	Kadri Hazbiu	June 22, 1958	July 13, 1962	PPSh
Chairman of the Five-Year Plans of the Socialist People's Republic of Albania	Koço Theodhosi	June 22, 1958	July 13, 1962	PPSh
Minister of Trade and Communications	Gogo Nushi	June 22, 1958	July 13, 1962	PPSh
Minister of Finance	Aleks Verli	June 22, 1958	July 13, 1962	PPSh
Minister of Justice	Bilbil Klosi	June 22, 1958	July 13, 1962	PPSh
Minister of Industry, Mines and Geology	Adil Çarçani	June 22, 1958	July 13, 1962	PPSh

== See also ==
- History of Albania
- Party of Labour of Albania

Preceded by Shehu I	Government of Albania; 1958–1962	Succeeded by Shehu III
