= The Successor (novel) =

2003 novel by Ismail Kadare

- First edition
- Author: Ismail Kadare
- Original title: Pasardhësi
- Cover artist: Magritte, Memory - 1948
- Language: Albanian
- Genre: History
- Publisher: Shtëpia Botuese "55"
- Publication date: 2003
- Publication place: Albania
- English publication date: 2005
- Pages: 226
- ISBN: 978-1-55970-773-2
- Preceded by: Agamemnon's Daughter

The Successor (Albanian: Pasardhësi) is a 2003 novel by the Albanian writer and inaugural International Man Booker Prize winner Ismail Kadare. It is the second part of a diptych of which the first part is the novella Agamemnon's Daughter. The diptych is ranked by many critics among the author's greatest works.

== Background ==
Agamemnon's Daughter, the prequel to The Successor, was written in 1985 and smuggled out of Albania before the collapse of the Hoxhaist regime, but it was published almost two decades later, after Kadare had already composed The Successor as its companion-piece. As opposed to the more personal Agamemnon's Daughter, The Successor is much more grounded in actual history, presenting a fictional account of the events that may have led to the still-unexplained 1981 death of Mehmet Shehu, Albania's long-time Prime Minister during the Cold War and Enver Hoxha's most trusted ally and designated number two ever since the death of Stalin and the subsequent Soviet–Albanian split. Official Albanian government sources called his death a suicide, but his denouncement as "multiple foreign agent" and "traitor to the motherland" and the ensuing prosecution of the entire Shehu clan (starting with his influential wife, Fiqrete Shehu and his son, Albanian writer Bashkim Shehu) has led to persistent popular rumors that Shehu had in fact been murdered on orders coming directly from either Enver Hoxha or his wife Nexhmije.

== Plot ==
The novel is divided into seven chapters, the first four of which ("A Death in December", "The Autopsy", "Fond Memories", and "The Fall") are narrated by an omniscient narrator, and the fifth ("The Guide") by a third person limited narrator (the dictator of the country, a thinly veiled portrait of Enver Hoxha). As the mystery behind the death – announced, in a characteristically simple Kadareian manner, in the novel's opening sentence ("The Designated Successor was found dead in his bedroom at dawn on December 14") – ostensibly closes to an inevitable resolution, the narration abruptly turns to first-person point of view, as each of the last two chapters is narrated by one of the novel's two most important characters: "The Architect" (who renovated the Successor's palace and was one of only few people who knew about its secret underground passage leading directly from the Guide's to the Successor's home), and in the "extraordinary [last] chapter", "The Successor", the already deceased title character.

Essentially a political thriller and a "whodunit tragicomedy", The Successor gradually moves away from speculating about the identity of the likely murderer – after juggling with the possibilities of him being a Sigurimi agent sent by Hoxha, a rising political figure called Adrian Hasobeu striving to become the Number 2, the Architect who once felt offended by the Successor's jokes, or even the Successor's wife who slept much too soundly during the murder – choosing instead to focus on the brutal effects a close-knit dictatorship may have on everyone forced to live under it, no matter how safe he or she may seem in the eyes of the outward observers. Possibly analysing his own controversial dual role as both a privileged writer and an internal dissident under the Hoxha regime, Kadare uses the figure of the Architect to explore the problem of artistic integrity in such circumstances, and the events of Agamemnon's Daughter are here recounted once again – this time through the eyes of the female protagonist, Suzana – as further evidence that even the most intimate feelings, such as love, may fall victim to political intrigues and the demands of the state, in cases when the individual is continually sacrificed at a more fundamental, systematic level.

== Reception ==
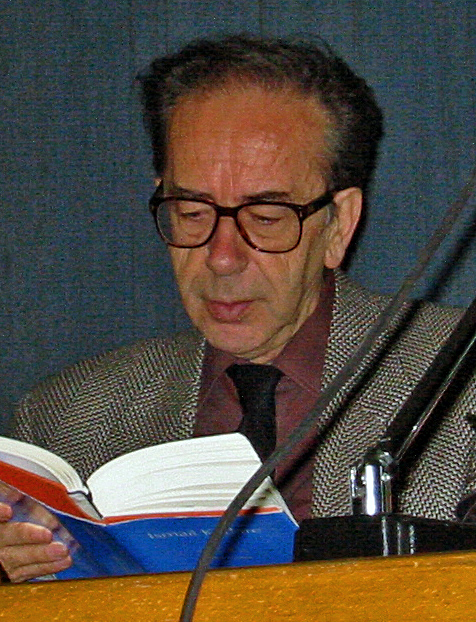
Ismail Kadare

The diptych Agamemnon's Daughter/The Successor is considered by Kadare's French publisher, Fayard's editor Claude Durand, "one of the finest and most accomplished of all Ismail Kadare's works to date". Characterizing it as "laceratingly direct" in its criticism of the totalitarian regime, in a longer overview of Kadare's works, James Wood describes the diptych as "surely one of the most devastating accounts ever written of the mental and spiritual contamination wreaked on the individual by the totalitarian state". Wood compares Kadare favourably to both Orwell and Kundera, considering him to be "a far deeper ironist than the first, and a better storyteller than the second". As an especially good example of Kadare's irony, he points out to one of the concluding passages of The Successor's third chapter, when the almost blind Guide, led by his wife, visits the Successor's renovated home for the first time and suddenly discovers a dimmer, a novelty in Albania at the time, the lavishness of which may be treated as a possible bourgeois trait by the paranoid leader:

Silence had fallen all around, but when he managed to turn on the light and make it brighter, he laughed out loud. He turned the switch further, until the light was at maximum strength, then laughed again, ha-ha-ha, as if he’d just found a toy that pleased him. Everyone laughed with him, and the game went on until he began to turn the dimmer down. As the brightness dwindled, little by little everything began to freeze, to go lifeless, until all the many lamps in the room went dark.

— Ismail Kadare, translated by David Bellos from Tedi Papavrami's French translation, The Successor (Arcade Publishing 2005, 113)

The same passage is excerpted by James Lasdun as representative of Kadare's power to chillingly portray fear and "the reptilian consciousness" of dictators. Lasdun considers The Successor a "gripping, fitfully brilliant" novel, which employs everything "from documentary realism to Kafkaesque fabulism" to depict a world bereaved of heroes, a universe where "everyone is stained, contaminated, implicated" – not excluding the author himself.

Even though branding the translation "clunky", a review by Publishers Weekly believes that the novel reaffirms Kadare's place "with Orwell, Kafka, Kundera and Solzhenitsyn as a major chronicler of oppression". Lorraine Adams both cites and questions this in a "lukewarm review" for The New York Times, which she concludes by reiterating the possibility of reading The Successor "as something of a coded commentary on Kadare's own life. Just as we long to know the cause of the Successor's death, so do we long to resolve Kadare's true place in Hoxha's Albania. The archive may yet be discovered that helps Kadare's part become clearer. Will we ever know?"

Much like Lasdun's and albeit implicitly, Adams' review refers to a well-publicized denouncement of Kadare by the Romanian émigré poet Renata Dumitrascu, who, in the wake of the announcement of the Man Booker International Prize winner in 2005, scathingly described the Albanian author as "an astute chameleon, adroitly playing the rebel here and there to excite the naïve Westerners who were scouting for voices of dissent from the East". In a reply to Lorraine Adams, Kadare's English translator David Bellos refuted these allegations as "fabrications", pointing to the fact that the regime's file on Kadare has already been published and is readily available to the public.

Fundamentally echoing Landus' judgment, Simon Caterson dispenses with this kind of black-and-white reasoning, writing that "even if Kadare was complicit in the Hoxha regime, and there is nothing in this remarkable novel to suggest he was not, it is quite possible that The Successor could not otherwise have been written. As it is, the book asks questions for which, to its credit, it can find no convenient answers." Leaving aside the nature of Kadare's political role, Murrough O'Brien calls The Successor a "strangely uplifting" novel, "despite the relentless tragedy it depicts, the tragedy of people yanked between fear and bewilderment. The final section, despite its sombreness, swings you up into the region where cruelty and pettiness are themselves left without air."

== See also ==
- Albanian literature
