= Feçor Shehu =

Albanian politician

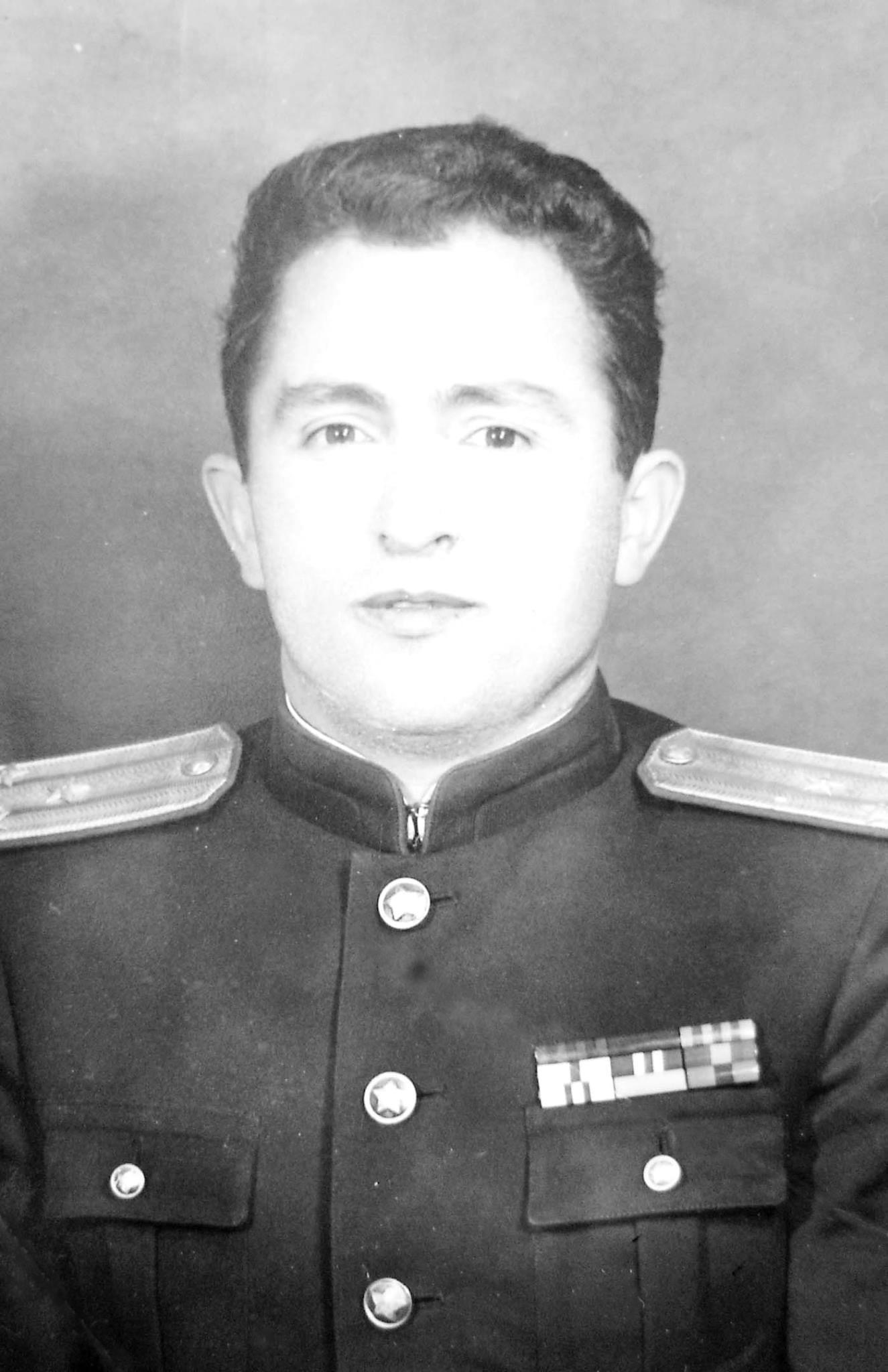
- Official portrait, 1948

Minister of Interior of the People's Republic of Albania
- In office 27 December 1979 – 14 January 1982
- President: Haxhi Lleshi
- Prime Minister: Mehmet Shehu
- Preceded by: Kadri Hazbiu
- Succeeded by: Hekuran Isai

Personal details
- Born: March 26, 1926 Mallakastër District, Albania
- Died: September 15, 1983 (aged 57) Linzë, Albania
- Cause of death: Execution by firing squad
- Party: Party of Labour of Albania

Feçor Shehu (26 March 1926 - 15 September 1983) was a politician of Communist Albania who served as Minister of Internal Affairs and Sigurimi from 1978 to 1982.

== Biography ==
Shehu was born in the Mallakastër District in 1923. Although he shares the same surname as Mehmet Shehu, he is not related to Mehmet Shehu. After Shehu's suicide, Feçor Shehu, Fiqrete Shehu, Former Minister of Internal Affair from 1954 to 1978 Kadri Hazbiu, Foreign Minister Nesti Nase, other political figures as Llambi Peçini - Diplomat and Head of Security for Blloku highly restricted area, Llambi Ziçishti - former Minister of Public Health, Xhavit Ismailaga, and many others from the ranks of the army and police were sent to trial and condemned. Feçor Shehu was executed, together with Hazbiu, on 15 September 1983. His remains were discovered in 1995.

== Legacy ==
Shehu is remembered for his brutal interrogation tactics with political prisoners or persons of interest. He is also mentioned as a pervert and rapist of young athlete women, and especially of arrested women who were being held by the Sigurimi. Controversies reached at a maximum when the Municipality of Mallakastër's Council awarded him with the title "Qytetar Nderi" (Honorary citizenship) on 20 November 2014, which led to the expulsion of the DPA councilmen from the Democratic Party of Albania.
