= Tefta Cami =

Albanian politician (born 1940)

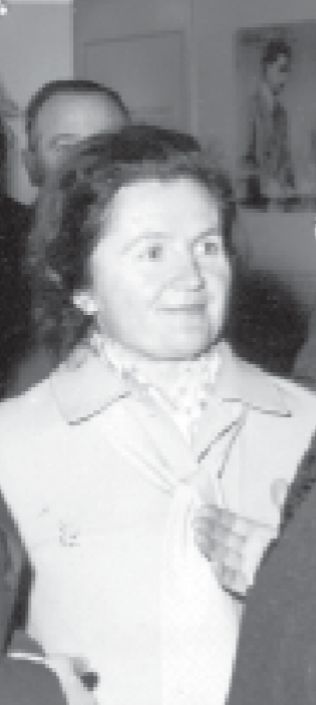

Minister of Education
- Prime Minister: Mehmet Shehu, Adil Carcani
- Leader: Enver Hoxha, Ramiz Alia
- Preceded by: Thoma Deliana
- Succeeded by: Skender Gjinushi

Minister of Culture
- Preceded by: Thoma Deliana
- Succeeded by: Moikom Zeqo

Personal details
- Born: Tefta Cani; August 15, 1940 (age 85) Diber, Albania
- Party: Party of Labour
- Spouse: Medi Cami
- Parent: Ahmet Cani
- Occupation: Politician

Tefta Cami Cani (born August 15, 1940) is an Albanian politician of the Albanian Party of Labour. She served as a Minister of Culture and Minister of Education, Sports and Youth at the same time from 1976 to 1987.

== Early life and education ==
Tefta Cami was born on August 15, 1940 in Diber, Albania. Her father Ahmet Cani was a partisan.

In 1959 she graduated from the pedagogical school in Peshkopi and on 1964 she graduated in Tirana for Albania Language and Literature. In 1972 she completed the senior philosophy course and in 1988 the scientific degree "Candidate of Sciences".

== Career ==
From 1964 to 1967 she served as a director and deputy director in pedagogical high school "Demir Gashi" in Peshkopi. In 1970 she became a member and secretary of Albanian Party of Labour in Tirana. In 1976 Enver Hoxha appointed her as Minister of Culture and Education until 1987, two years after his death.

== Personal life ==
After her removal from office, Tefta became a school principal again from 1987 to 1991. From 1993 to 2006 she became association president and board chair of an art high school. She married doctor Medi Cami.
