= Shtylla =

Shtylla is a surname. Notable people with the surname include:

- Behar Shtylla (1918–1994), Albanian diplomat
- Medar Shtylla (1907–1963), Albanian politician
