= SHISH =

Primary intelligence agency of Albania

State Intelligence Service
- Shërbimi Informativ i Shtetit
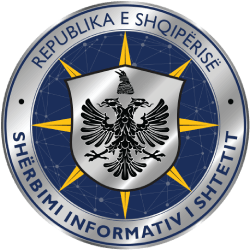
- Emblem of the State Intelligence Service

Agency overview
- Formed: 1997
- Preceding agencies: Sigurimi until 1991; SHIK 1991–1997
- Headquarters: Tirana, Albania
- Agency executive: Esmeralda Hasani, Director
- Website: www.shish.gov.al

The State Intelligence Service (Albanian: Shërbimi Informativ i Shtetit), commonly known by its acronym SHISH, is the main national civilian intelligence and security agency of Albania. It was preceded by SHIK.

== After the Declaration of Independence ==
The government decree of Ismail Qemali explicitly stated the need to establish a Secret Service for the occupied areas of Albania in Article 6. These historical records are kept in Fund No. 145 of the Central State Archive, specifically within the files of the Provisional Presidency of Vlora in the year 1912, under the title "Decisions and Minutes of the Provisional Government of Vlora on Political, Military, and Financial Issues" (File II-2). The creation of the Albanian Secret Service was not merely a theoretical concept, as concrete actions were taken to set it up, including the involvement of individuals such as Lef Nosi and Bajram Curri. Furthermore, there is evidence of the Service's continued operation even after Prince Wilhelm Wied assumed rulership of Albania, which was established through the London Peace Conference in 1913.

== During the reign of Prince Wied ==
The Albanian Secret Service was continued after the First World War and the departure of Prince Wied from Albania. The Statute of Lushnja, which was drafted at the Lushnja National Congress on January 21, 1920, re-established the separation of powers into legislature, executive, and judiciary, and it also created the Ministry of the Interior, which included the Secret Service. Ahmet Zogu was appointed as the Minister of Internal Affairs.

== After World War II ==
After the Second World War, the Albanian state gave considerable importance to the establishment of State Security Organs, which took place from December 1944 to March 1945.

== Communist period ==
The origins of the State Security can be traced back to July 20, 1943, when the General National Liberation Council decided to create this organization. The State Security consisted of individuals deemed highly trustworthy by the communist regime, and it functioned as a branch within the Ministry of Internal Affairs.

== Post-communist period ==
After the year 1990 and the introduction of political pluralism in Albania, significant changes occurred, leading to a comprehensive reform of the State Security Organs. The objective of these reforms was to align the security apparatus with the principles and requirements of the rule of law.

== Restructuring and renaming ==
In 1991, the 'National Intelligence Service' was established by the enactment of Law No. 7495, dated 02.07.1991, titled "On the organization of the National Intelligence Service." The main mission of this Service was to prevent, detect, and eliminate any unconstitutional activity that threatened the freedom, independence, defensive capacity, territorial integrity, and national wealth of the Republic of Albania. The creation of SHIK aimed to establish a depoliticized institution, which led to continuous modifications and adaptations over the years.

== Name after 1999 ==
In 1999, the name SHIK was changed through Decision No. 61, dated 22.11.1999, issued by the Constitutional Court of the Republic of Albania. The new name adopted for the organization was the State Intelligence Service, reflecting its evolving role. Subsequently, in 2005, Law No. 9357, dated 17.03.2005, titled "On the status of the employee of the State Intelligence Service," was enacted, outlining the legal framework for the employees of the service. As the State Intelligence Service carries out its responsibilities, it places a strong emphasis on maintaining a balance between providing necessary information and respecting the rights and freedoms of individuals. The principles of legitimacy, objectivity, and confidentiality form the fundamental basis of the institution's operations.

The National Informative Service (SHIK) was created by the Albanian parliament in 1991. The agency had been used to manage internal dissent and protect the interests of the individual members of the regime.

On April 1, 1997, Bashkim Fino, the Prime Minister of Albania, announced that SHIK activity would be suspended effectively from March 31. SHIK Director Bashkim Gazidede and his deputy, Bujar Rama, resigned from duty. On May 30, the president named Arben Karkini as the new head of SHIK. He was succeeded by Fatos Klosi after the Socialist Party of Albania won the July 1997 parliamentary elections. In October 1997, the United States Central Intelligence Agency (CIA) sent a team of experts to assist the government in restructuring SHIK. In November 1999, SHIK was renamed SHISH, and the previous director was Visho Ajazi.

== Mission and function ==
The State Intelligence Service (SHISH) responsibilities include acquiring clandestine and covert operations, counterintelligence, counterterrorism, foreign intelligence gathering, hybrid warfare operations, and internal security on issues relevant to national security. The agency is responsible for the comprehensive collection, processing, and analysis of intelligence, as well as the dissemination and utilization of intelligence products. Its duties also extend to issues related to constitutional order, particularly in fighting organized crime, illegal trafficking, and terrorism.

The State Intelligence Service has the following duties:

- Collect information from abroad for the purpose of national security.
- Collect information on organized crime that poses a threat to national security.
- Gather information on terrorist activity, the production and trafficking of narcotics, the development of weapons of mass destruction, and crimes against the environment.
- Undertake intelligence activities to protect integrity, independence, and constitutional order.

== Organization ==
The personnel of SHISH are well-trained and are assigned to six branches:

- Counter-Espionage Branch
- Counter-Organized Crime Branch
- Counter-Terrorism Branch
- Foreign Intelligence Branch
- Internal Operations Branch
- Technical Operations Branch

== Relationship with other state entities ==
Institutional Position of the State Intelligence Service and Relationship with Other State Bodies:

The State Intelligence Service operates under the authority of the Prime Minister. Its Head is appointed and dismissed by the President of the Republic upon the advice of the Prime Minister of Albania.

SHISH operates within this framework, and while it has been identified as being "generally under effective civilian control" (U.S. Department of State, 2004), the agency has been associated with various abuses within the country and continues to play a significant role in domestic politics. The Albanian government has received support from the U.S. and European countries in working to establish or reform national institutions, including its intelligence and security services.

== Activities by country ==
=== Albania ===
Albania's Minister of Defense, Mimi Kodheli, has announced that the Intelligence Service has successfully prevented some terrorist attacks. Although Kodheli did not provide specific details, it has been reported by Top Channel that the prevented attacks were related to a football match with Israel. Additionally, the meeting between CIA Director John Brennan and Minister of Defense Mimi Kodheli in Tirana during the first week of December served not only as a courtesy visit but also as an evaluation of the capabilities and services provided by the Armed Forces, particularly the Albanian Military Intelligence Service, to allied countries.

In 2018, the SHISH was exposed in a news story by journalists Borzou Daraghi and Vincent Triest. They obtained a massive amount of data shared by SHISH with unclassified government institutions, which was later published online. The leaks revealed the existence of at least eight senior clandestine Albanian operatives, including their names, positions, salaries, and expenses, who were working in Belgium, Greece, Kosovo, Italy, Macedonia, and Serbia. The leaked files also included information about other senior, mid-level, and field operatives, as well as vehicle registrations and locations of safe houses. The SHISH initially took the data down and downplayed its significance, although they admitted that sensitive information was leaked.

=== North Macedonia ===
During the 2001 insurgency in Macedonia, there were allegations that the State Intelligence Service and the Central Intelligence Agency provided support to the National Liberation Army (NLA) by supplying them with arms and tanks. However, the Albanian president at the time denied any involvement in the conflict in Macedonia.

== Directors ==
SHISH directors, ordered by term of office
Name	Start of term	End of term
Bashkim Gazidede	29 June 1992	9 April 1997
Fatos Klosi	21 August 1997	7 August 2002
Petrit Myftari	7 August 2002	18 November 2002
Kujtim Hysenaj	18 November 2002	27 January 2005
Bahri Shaqiri	27 January 2005	9 August 2012
Visho Ajazi	9 August 2012	30 October 2017
Helidon Bendo	6 November 2018	23 December 2022
Vlora Hyseni	3 April 2023	22 September 2026
Esmeralda Hasani	12 November 2026	incumbent

== See also ==
- Sigurimi
- SHIK
