= Mavrovë =

- Village
- Location within Albania
- Coordinates: 40°24′32″N 19°35′28″E
- Country: Albania
- County: Vlorë
- Municipality: Selenicë
- Administrative unit: Kotë
- Time zone: UTC+1 (CET)
  - Summer (DST): UTC+2 (CEST)

Mavrovë (Albanian definite form: Mavrova) is a village in the Vlorë County, Albania, about 11 km (7 mi) southeast of Vlorë, in the Shushicë River valley. At the 2015 local government reform, it became part of the municipality Selenicë.

== Notable people ==
- Kadri Hazbiu, Communist figure, Sigurimi Chief, Minister of Defence, and Minister of Interior
