= Agamemnon's Daughter =

2003 novella by Ismail Kadare

- First edition
- Author: Ismail Kadare
- Original title: Vajza e Agamemnonit
- Language: Albanian
- Genre: historical fiction, political fiction
- Publisher: Shtëpia Botuese "55"
- Publication date: 2003
- Publication place: Albania
- English publication date: 2006
- Pages: 110
- ISBN: 978-1611451085
- Followed by: The Successor

Agamemnon's Daughter (Albanian: Vajza e Agamemnonit) is a 2003 novella by the Albanian writer and inaugural International Man Booker Prize winner Ismail Kadare. It is the first part of a diptych of which the second and longer part is The Successor. It is considered by many critics to be one of the author's greatest works.

== Background ==
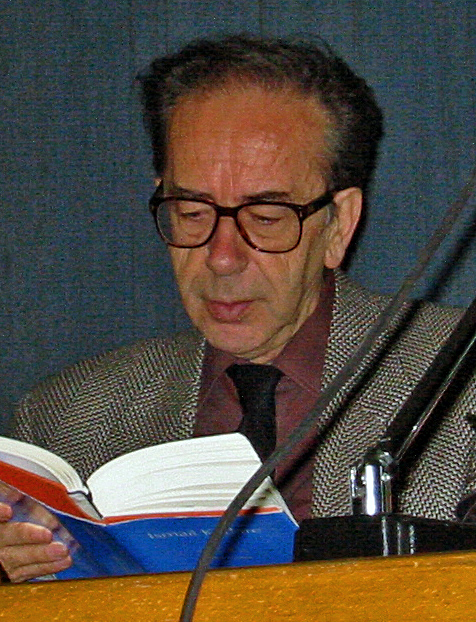
Ismail Kadare

Written in 1985, during the last years of the stalinist regime in Albania, together with The Shadow and A Bird Flying South, Agamemnon's Daughter was one of the three literary manuscripts Ismail Kadare managed to smuggle out of Albania just after the death of Enver Hoxha, and with the help of French editor and translator Claude Durand. The first pages of the three manuscripts were masked as Albanian translations of works by Siegfried Lenz, before Durand travelled to Tirana to get the remainder of the novels and successfully deposit them in a safe at the Banque de la Cité in Paris. Translated by the famous Albanian violinist, Tedi Papavrami, from the original and unrevised manuscripts, Agamemnon's Daughter first appeared in French in 2003, but only after Kadare had already authored its sequel, The Successor.

== Plot ==
The novella is told through the perspective of an unnamed television journalist with somewhat liberal views who is unexpectedly invited to the annual May Day Parade – aimed almost exclusively at glorifying the leader of the country – shortly after his girlfriend Suzana, daughter of the leader's designated successor, breaks up her relationship with him, citing his possible unsuitability and the fact it may tarnish her father's reputation. Much like Joyce's Ulysses, the novella is an internal monologue chronicling the thoughts of the narrator about Suzana and the people he encounters as he walks to the stands of the stadium. As such, it functions as "a portfolio of sketches of human ruination – a brief Inferno, in which victims of the regime are serially encountered" by the narrator.

As is usually the case with Kadare, the destinies of some of these people – none of which have names, but initials – are juxtaposed to an ancient Balkan tale, introduced first as an elucidatory comment on the rise of G. Z., a sycophantic figure who survived several purges in manners unknown to many. The tale-leitmotif recounts the story of the Bald Man who was saved from Hell by an eagle, at the price of his own meat; when he reached the heavens, he was nothing but a skeleton.

However, the overarching analogy is the one the narrator uncovers while reading Graves' Greek Myths and the one tempting him to liken Suzana's destiny (as well as the destiny of Stalin's eldest son Yakov Dzhugashvili) to the one of Agamemnon's daughter, Iphigeneia – all victims of "a tyrant's cynical ploy", one which, instead of humane and exemplary, served only to the cause of giving the tyrants – Agamemnon, Stalin, Hoxha, or the designated successor in this case – "the right to demand the life of anyone else" in the future.

== Reception ==
"Fusing the moods of Kafka and Orwell", the diptych Agamemnon's Daughter/The Successor is considered by Kadare's French publisher, Fayard's editor Claude Durand, "one of the finest and most accomplished of all Ismail Kadare's works to date". Describing it as "laceratingly direct" in its criticism of the totalitarian regime, in a longer overview of Kadare's works, James Wood calls Agamemnon’s Daughter "perhaps [Kadare's] greatest book" and considers it, along with The Successor, "surely one of the most devastating accounts ever written of the mental and spiritual contamination wreaked on the individual by the totalitarian state".

== See also ==
- Albanian literature
