= Çorrush =

- Village
- Location within Albania
- Coordinates: 40°26′39″N 19°48′02″E
- Country: Albania
- County: Fier
- Municipality: Mallakastër
- Administrative unit: Kutë
- Time zone: UTC+1 (CET)
  - Summer (DST): UTC+2 (CEST)
- Website: http://corrushi.blogspot.com

Çorrush (Albanian definite form: Çorrushi) is a village in the former Kutë municipality, Fier County, southwestern Albania. At the 2015 local government reform, it became part of the municipality Mallakastër.

Currently, Çorrush has 16 locally known neighborhoods; Hederaj, Shehaj, Allkomuçaj, Majas, Varfaj, Llakaj, Bajraktaraj, Asllanaj, Caushaj, Banaj, Kolaj, Qendër, Agaraj, Kënaj, Shullënjas and Zotoagaj. Each of the neighborhoods is located on a different hilltop. The inhabitants of the village are called Çorrushiotë.

== Geography ==
Çorrush highest point measures 520m at the hill Maja e Gjatë. Vjosë river serves as a border with two other regions, Vlorë County and Gjirokastër County.

== History ==
First attested in the Ottoman register of 1570, the village at that time was documented to have three neighborhoods, Moskat, Kasadat and Lazarat. Nowadays they are respectively called Kënaj, Shullënjas and Banaj.

In the first years of the 18th century came in Çorrush, for enmity reasons, the family of Dëro Iljazi (Hadër Iljazi) from Progonat, Tepelenë District. The family was placed in the neighborhood which now is called Hederaj. Hederaj took the name from the head of this family. From the descendants of this family were later created three other neighborhoods; Allkomucaj, Bregas and Varfaj. For enmity reason also came in 1880 the well known family of Caush Prifti from the village of Hormovë, Tepelenë District. After the family came they were placed and formed four other neighborhoods; Agaraj, Caushaj, Zotoagaj and Asllanaj. While neighborhood Bajraktaraj has the origin from the family of Bajraktar (Flamurtar) also from the village of Hormovë, who came in the same time with the family of Caush Prifti for the same enmity reasons. The newest neighborhood Qendër was formed after the year 1970 by the families of other neighborhoods.

== Notable people ==
- Mehmet Shehu
- Kastriot Islami

== Gallery ==
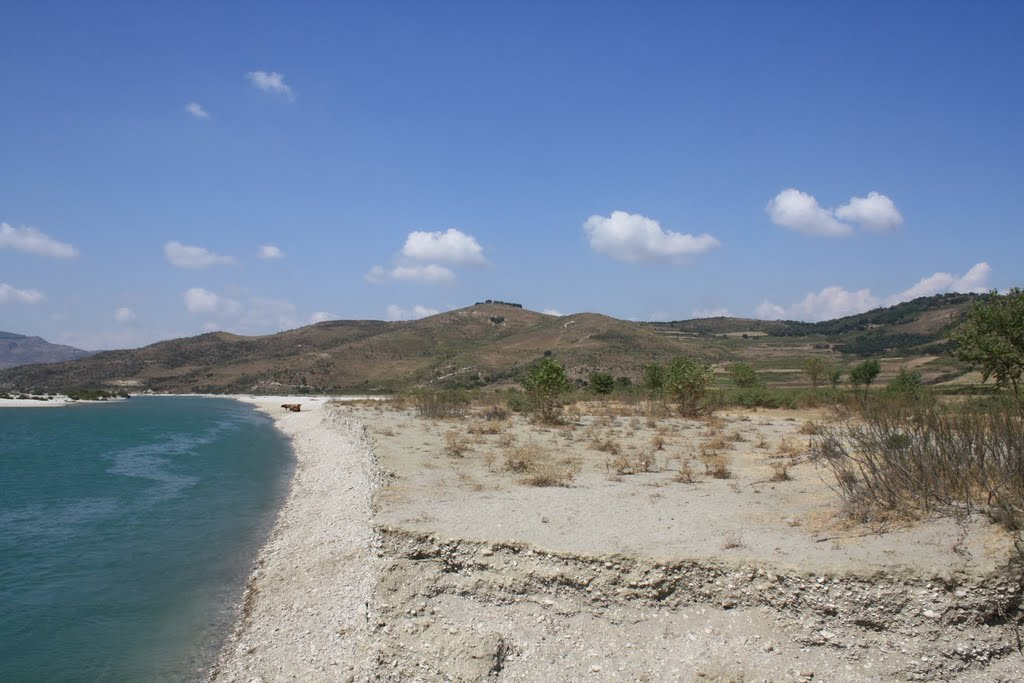
Vjosa river during the hot summer days.

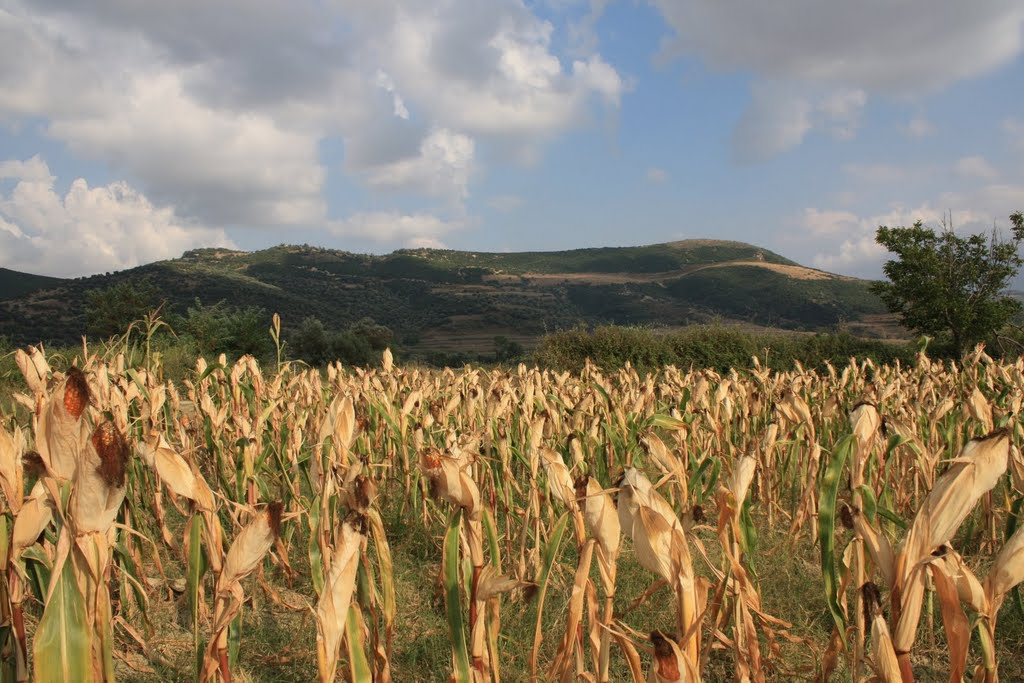
Corn field in the south of the village.

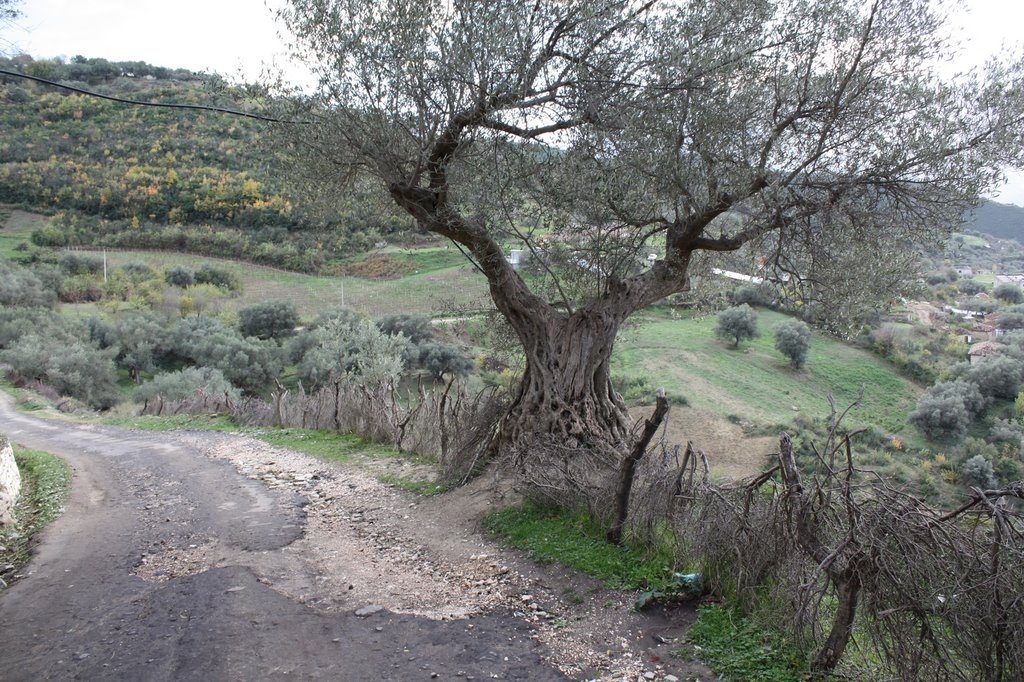
Typical view of the main road which passes through the center of the village.

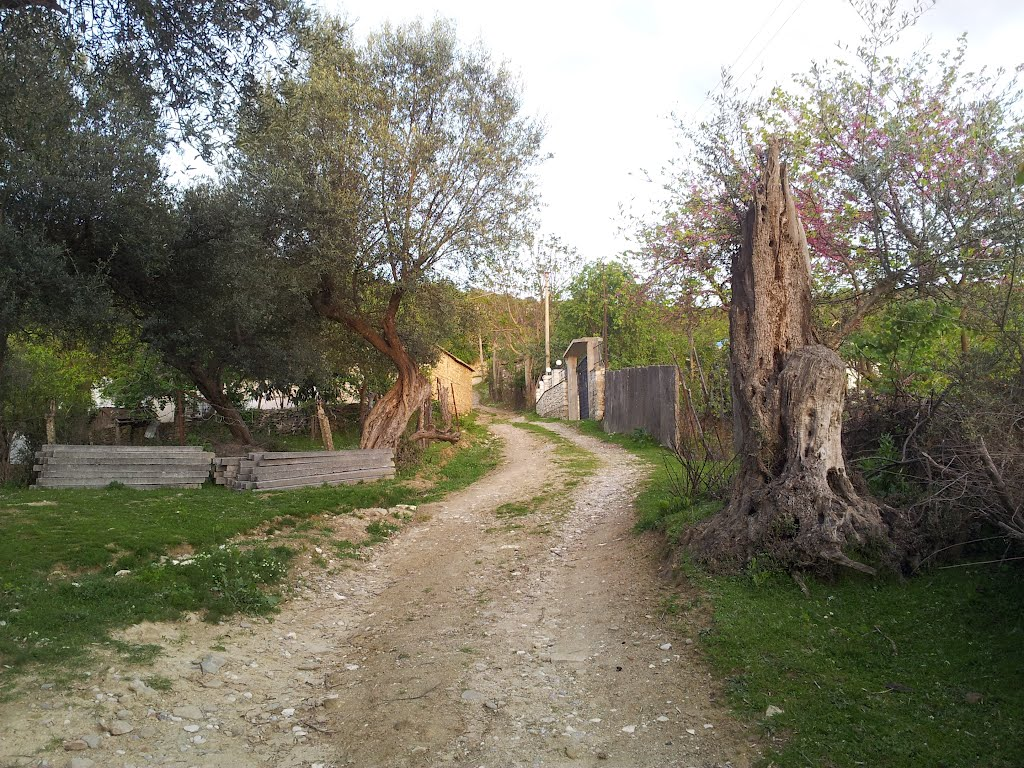
Typical view of the main road of a Neighborhood.

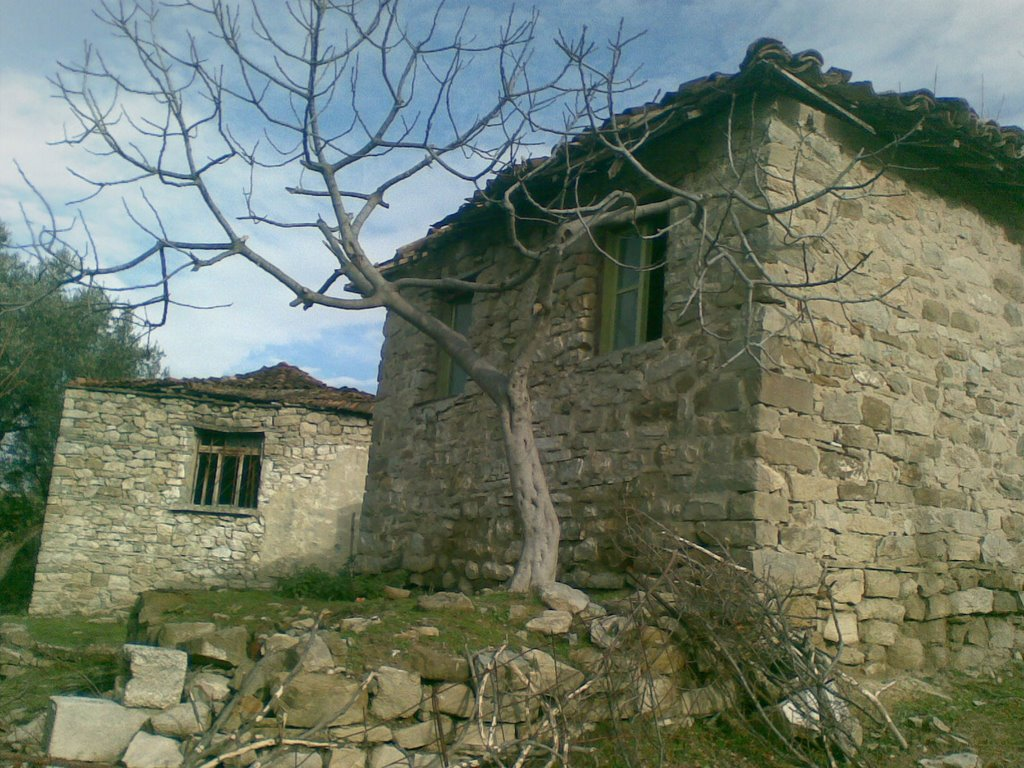
Typical house of the village.

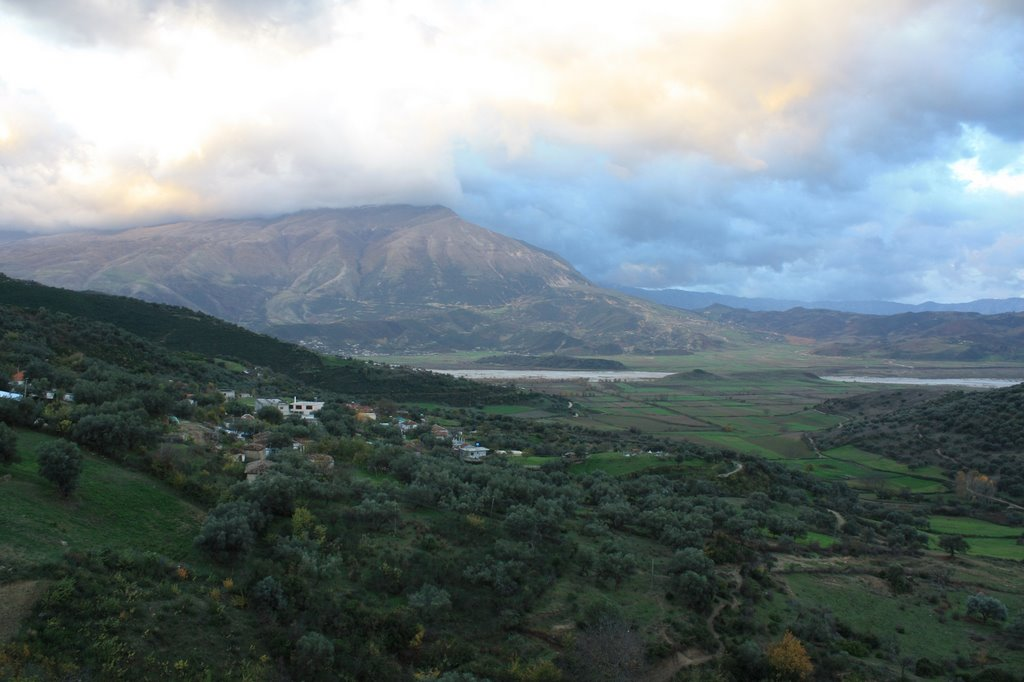
Typical view of the fields and Griba mountain from neighborhood Hederaj.
