= Liberation of Tepelena =

- Part of World War II in Albania
Date	1943
Location	Tepelena, Albania
Result	LANÇ victory; Italian troops were given safe passage to Saranda

Belligerents
LANÇ	Italy; Germany; Diplomatic Support: Balli Kombetar

Commanders and leaders
Abaz Shehu; Mehmet Shehu	(Kingdom of Italy) Colonel Foskos (surrendered); Diplomatic Support: Ali Këlcyra

Casualties and losses
Unknown	Unknown

The Liberation of Tepelena in 1943 was a military offensive involving communist Albanian partisans against Italy, Nazi Germany, and the Balli Kombëtar. The Italian forces ultimately surrendered following diplomatic negotiation.

== Background ==
Before the final action, the decision was communicated to the entire political and military factor. A veteran and participant in the battle, Çome Cini, described a strategic trip made by Zenel Shehu, Xhevat Shehu, and others through Kurvelesh.

Zenel Shehu, Xhevat Shehu, I and someone else made a trip through Kurvelesh, starting from Bënça, Lekdush, Progonat, Gusmar and returned to Turan. The purpose of this trip was to meet with the leaders of the Movement in Kurvelesh and to prepare for the liberation of Tepelena.

The forces from Labëria side made a preliminary siege, while those from the Toscana side approached Tepelena on the outskirts, strategically positioning themselves for the final intervention.

== Battle ==
The liberation movement in Tepelena intensified in 1943, with the establishment of various partisan detachments like "Naim Frashëri" and "Selam Musai." These detachments later merged to form the "Baba Abaz" Battalion, named after a patriot who was shot by fascists in June 1943. On August 10, 1943 arrived, the "Baba Abaz" Battalion joined forces with other partisan detachments in Donie of Kalivaci, further solidifying their presence in the region.

The liberation forces strategized their approach to Tepelena, encircling the area from different directions. Battles erupted at various locations, such as Mogila, Qafa Mirica, and Qafa e Kiçoku, where the partisan forces achieved significant victories, boosting the morale of the local population and diminishing the Italian forces' grip on the region.

In September 1943, the leaders of the liberation of Tepelena, including figures like Abas Shehu, Zenel Shehu, Mustafa Matohiti, Adil Çarçani, and Asaf Dragoti, made a momentous decision. They resolved to liberate Tepelena as the center of the Subprefecture and set September 10, 1943, as the date for the final attack.

However, instead of engaging in a bloody confrontation, the leaders of the Tepelena offensive sought a diplomatic resolution. They requested a meeting with the Italian army commander after Italy had already announced its capitulation on September 9, 1943. The Italian commander accepted the surrender the next day.

== Aftermath ==
With the agreement in place, the Italian forces were disarmed, and they were allowed to move towards Saranda under the guarantee of security provided by Zenel Shehu and his colleagues. The liberation of Tepelena marked a significant milestone in the resistance War, further weakening the Italian occupation and strengthening the resolve of the Albanian resistance.
