= SHIK =

Albanian intelligence service

National Informative Service
- Shërbimi Informativ Kombëtar

Agency overview
- Formed: 7 February 1991
- Preceding agency: Sigurimi
- Dissolved: 31 March 1997
- Superseding agency: SHISH
- Jurisdiction: Albania
- Headquarters: Tirana, Albania

The National Informative Service (Albanian: Shërbimi Informativ Kombëtar), commonly known as SHIK, was an intelligence service agency created in 1991 by the Albanian People's Assembly. It was the successor to Sigurimi, the notorious secret service agency which repressed anti-communist dissent during the communist government of 1944–1991. The agency was succeeded by SHISH in 1997.

== Directors ==
No.	Name	Term in office
1	Irakli Koçollari	1 August 1991	29 June 1992
2	Bashkim Gazidede	29 June 1992	9 April 1997
3	Astrit Kodra	9 April 1997	29 May 1997
4	Arben Karkini	29 May 1997	21 August 1997

== See also ==
- Sigurimi
- SHISH
