= Ardian Klosi =

Albanian writer, translator and activist

- Born: 9 July 1957; Tirana, PSR Albania
- Died: 26 April 2012 (aged 54); Tirana, Albania
- Education: BSc on Albanian literature and PhD on German and Comparative Literature
- Alma mater: University of Tirana, University of Innsbruck
- Occupations: Albanologist; publicist; writer; translator; journalist; social activist
- Spouse: Jutta Benzenberg
- Children: two daughters
- Relatives: Bilbil Klosi (father) former Minister of Justice in period 1953—1966 (regime of Enver Hoxha)
- Writing career
- Language: Albanian, German
- Notable awards: Kult (2005); Best translator of 2008

Ardian Klosi (9 July 1957 – 26 April 2012) was an Albanian publicist, albanologist, writer, translator and social activist. He graduated Albanian literature at the University of Tirana in 1981 and received his PhD on German and Comparative Literature at the University of Innsbruck.

== Early life and family ==
Ardian Klosi was born in Tirana in 1957 to Klosi family, originally from Mallakastër. His father was Bilbil Klosi, the former Minister of Justice in period 1953—1966 and secretary of the presidium of the National Assembly in period 1966—1973.

In 1981 Ardian earned a degree in Albanian literature at the University of Tirana.

== Return to Albania ==
Klosi returned to Albania in 1998 and engaged in civil society activities and journalism. After returning from Germany, Klosi was from 1998 to 1999 the General Director of Radio Televizioni Shqiptar, the public broadcaster of Albania.

== Bibliography ==
Klosi's activity is closely related to books and other publications:

- “Reflections” with Edi Rama
- "Albania, a Painful Awakening”
- "Quo Vadis, Albania" (Whither Goest Thou, Albania)
- "Albania, What can it Be in the Future”
- "Albanian Survival" in German
- a German-Albanian vocabulary, in cooperation with other authors in 1997

Klosi has given a great contribution in translation into Albanian. Authors whose works he translated include Friedrich Dürrenmatt, Max Frisch, Mark Twain, Franz Kafka, Bertolt Brecht, Heinrich Böll, Georg Büchner, Ernest Gellner and François Pouqueville. He was awarded several times for his translations: with "Kult" prize for the best translation of the non-fiction book of 2005 (Karl Reinhold's "Pelasgic Nights"). and "Best translator of 2008" for the translation of Oliver Schmitt's "Skanderbeg. Der neue Alexander auf dem Balkan".

== Death and reactions ==
Klosi had a long history of mental health issues, particularly depression, which had severely affected him in different points of his life. Following the death of his mother in November 2011, he unsuccessfully attempted suicide and was treated in a Tirana hospital. After he was discharged from the hospital, he was fired from his workplace at the Goethe Institute of Tirana, where he had worked for a number of years. This led to yet another suicide attempt, for which he was hospitalised again. In the early hours of April 26, 2012, Klosi hanged himself in his holiday home in Dardhe, Korçë. He was 54 years old, and left behind two young daughters and his wife, German photographer Jutta Benzenberg.

The Albanian President Bamir Topi considered it "an irreplaceable loss for the family and the entire Albanian society, that today more than ever needs intellectuals of an independent and courageous voice, carrying out altruistic missions on behalf of the Albanian people.

The Socialist Party of Albania expressed their condolences, saying, "Ardian Klosi created a precious value with his example as an intellectual committed to give his efforts for democracy and social justice, and for an Albania that should be protected with its assets. He will be remembered as an active citizen in the civil battle against the environmental destructions, and who made the voice of independent citizens to be listened for environmental protection", the SP message says.

The opposition leader, Edi Rama, tweeted: “A dear friend of our country left this night, after refusing to coexist with vulgarity”.

He was buried at the public Sharra cemetery in a Tirana suburb.
