= Thoma Deliana =

Albanian politician (1925–2014)

Thoma Deliana (1925–2014) was an Albanian politician of the Communist Albania period, being the longest serving Minister of Education (1963-1976) overall.

== Life ==
Deliana was born in 1925 in Orthodox family of the Kala neighborhood of Elbasan in central Albania. He finished the elementary school in his town, and then enrolled in the Normal School of Elbasan where he was taught by Aleksander Xhuvani. As many other attendees of the school, he joined the ranks of the National Liberation Movement (LANC) during World War II. After distinguishing himself as a youth-member of the resistance, he was elected member of the Central Committee of the Albanian Antifascist Youth - the youth fraction of the LANC, in its first congress held in Helmës of Skrapar region. In September 1944, he was elected Head of the Antifascist Youth of Elbasan District and member of the Antifascist Council of LANC.

After World War II, with the rise of the Communists in power, he started working in the State Planning Commission, a crucial entity which would control all the economic life of the country, and later as a staff member of the Central Committee of the Party of Labour of Albania.

Deliana went to study in Moscow where he graduated in philosophy. Upon his return in Albania, he was elected First Secretary of the Party for Elbasan, and member of the Central Committee of the Party of Labour. In October 1961 he was appointed Deputy Minister and two years later Minister of Education and Culture. During his term he successfully completed major tasks that were under his ministry's area of responsibility. One was the total reconstruction of the textbooks; all of them needed revision to reflect the new Party of Labour's ideological line after the Soviet-Albanian split. The other was the unification of the Albanian language standard, which was achieved by the Orthography Congress of 1972. Other major achievements were the establishment of the Academy of Sciences of Albania, and two national pedagogy congresses held in Tirana.

In 1975, on the eve of the Sino-Albanian split, he was targeted and accused of opportunism and anti-Party spirit. He was expelled from the party together with Fadil Paçrami. The wave of persecution would continue soon with the demise of Koço Theodhosi, Abdyl Këllezi, Kiço Ngjela, etc., all high rank Communist officials and government ministers. To his list of accusations was added the favoring of former deputy ministers Hasan Duma and Mantho Bala, both accused of "immorality" and already demised. Deliana wrote an autocritique letter to Enver Hoxha, which saved his life. He was initially sent to Sinanaj village near Tepelenë where he worked as the local elementary school director. According to Margo Rejmer's book Mud is Sweeter than Honey, in an interview with one of Deliana's former students, the party decided he should have a more lowly job as an "enemy of the people" which is how the party defined him. He was sent to live in a shack with his wife and become a cowherd. Life became harder and harder for Deliana and his wife. Later he was removed from that position and sent to work in the state-controlled agricultural cooperative where he worked in animal husbandry until 1987 when he retired. This last job for him was hard, physical labor which broke his body but not his spirit. He continued to loan books and teach his former student. Deliana spoke of the country as a cannibal, with the leader, Enver Hoxha, as the one who fed off the people, using their pain and terror. After his retirement, he moved back to Elbasan.

Deliana died on 14 September 2014.
