= Liberation of Tirana =

Significant military offensive in Albania during World War II

- Part of World War II in Albania and the LANÇ counter-offensive in Albania (1944)
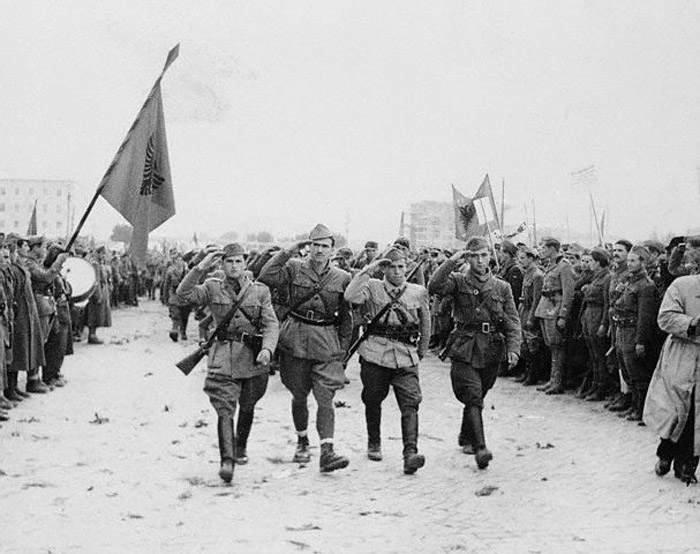
- Albanian Partisans marching in liberated Tirana
Date	28 October – 17 November 1944
Location	Tirana, Albania
Result	LANÇ victory; Nazi withdrawal from the capital

Belligerents
LANÇ (United Kingdom) Royal Air Force	Germany; Balli Kombëtar

Commanders and leaders
Enver Hoxha; Mehmet Shehu	Unknown; Unknown

Units involved
Brigade I and Brigade VII (initially); 11 brigades in total (final stage)	Unit 1

Strength
15,000	8,000+ 300 tanks

Casualties and losses
127 killed 290 wounded	100 killed 365 POWs the rest fled Equipment captured or destroyed: 25 artilleries 4 tanks 100 machine guns 200 vehicles 250 wagons

The Liberation of Tirana was the capture of the city by the communist forces during World War II in Albania. Albanian Partisans launched an attack on the German occupying forces in Tirana to seize the capital city.

== Description ==
The brigade forces fighting in the capital continued their attacks on the destruction of the encircled enemy, and in the morning of November 16 they were thrown into the final assault on the liberation of Tirana. As a result, forces of Brigade I occupied the House of Officers, Sahati, Theater, etc. Brigade VIII forces advanced on Kavaja Street and met with the right wing of Brigade I, narrowing even more the ring of enemy siege in the center of the capital. The enemy stood fiercely in ministry buildings, at the Bank, at the City Hall, and at the London hotel (where the National Historic Museum was built). The fighting continued very harsh throughout the day. At night, on November 17, the German command did not see any rescue opportunities. While all the conditions had been created to undermine or capture these forces, the Germans, taking advantage of the darkness of the night, emerged from the siege and clustered in the Aviation field. From there, after being organized for march, they moved towards Vora to Shkodra.

The last German forces retreating from Tirana were hit on the Tirana - Vora - Laç road. On the morning of November 17, 1944, after 19 days of severe and uninterrupted war, the capital of Albania, Tirana, was freed. The attack operation for the liberation of Tirana was prepared and developed in the framework of the UNÇSH's general crackdown on the full liberation of Albania. It was the continuation and the culmination of the general offense.

The liberation of the capital had great political and military significance. It crowned the victory of the Anti-fascist National Liberation War, caused great losses and delayed the withdrawal of German forces. Unit 1 Corps successfully completed the task that was laid Director General Headquarters of UNÇSH. The struggle for the liberation of Tirana was the biggest operation of operational-strategic scale developed by UNÇSH. In total 127 Albanians were killed in action and another 290 were injured meanwhile the Nazis had lost on their side 100 or more soldiers and had 365 captives, 25 artilleries, 4 tanks, 100 machine guns, 200 vehicles, 250 wagons captured or destroyed.

The Nazis did not implement their plan for destroying Tirana. The direct participation of the people, from the elderly to the children, was great, in various forms and ways. For conducting the operation, broad use found radio interconnection as well as other ways, such as meetings with subordinate staff, etc. Through this leadership activity, it was possible to directly and temporarily assist the staffs of the subordinate instances, which took and implemented effective measures, especially for the recognition of the enemy, the organization of the fighting, the maneuvering of the forces, their direction, etc. Creatively, the principle of maneuvering and concentration of forces came in increasing stages, which in the final stage reached the 11 brigades, which ensured the uninterrupted continuation of the operation to victory. The sectors and most neuralgic points of the enemy's defense system were determined, from the destruction of which the progress and the victory of the operation became possible.

== Literature ==
- Historia e Artit Ushtarak të Luftës Antifashiste Nacional Çlirimtare të Popullit Shqiptar – Tiranë, 1989. (Ministria e Mbrojtjes Popullore, Akademia Ushtarake) – Avni Hajro, Kadri Cenolli, Maksim Ilirjani, Mustafa Novi, Proletar Hasani, Refik Kucaj, Shahin Leka, Vangjel Kasapi.
- Shpresë për popullin, tmerr për armikun. Bridaga 1 Sulmuese – Tiranë, 1971.
- Historiku i Brigadës së 4 Sulmuese – Tiranë, 1998.
