= Bashkim Gazidede =

Albanian politician (1952–2008)

Director of the State Intelligence Service
- In office 29 June 1992 – 9 April 1997

Personal details
- Born: 2 February 1952 Dibër County, Albania
- Died: 25 October 2008 (aged 56) Tirana, Albania
- Parent: Osman Shehu (Father)

Bashkim Gazidede (2 February 1952 – 25 October 2008) was an Albanian mathematician, author, politician, and a chief of the national intelligence agency.

== Life ==
He was born Bashkim Shehu to Osman Shehu, a sheikh, nationalist, and outspoken anticommunist from Dibër County. Osman Shehu underwent persecutions and humiliations during communist rule. All of his family changed the family name to Gazidede. Gazidede himself was a lifelong devout Muslim.

Despite all the fact that "enemies of the people" were by law prohibited education past high school, he managed to enter the Luigj Gurakuqi University of Shkodra and graduated with a degree in Mathematics from the University of Tirana.

== Career ==
Between 1984 and 1992 Gazidede was an algebra and mathematics lecturer at the University of Tirana. In 1991 he affiliated with the Association of Muslim Intellectuals. In the same year he ran in parliamentary elections from a list of the Democratic Party of Albania, but he was elected in the constituency of Dibra only in the next elections in 1992.

In the period 1992–1997, during the rule of Sali Berisha, he directed the National Intelligence Service (Albanian: Shërbimi Informativ Kombëtar, SHIK), created after the disbanding of the communist intelligence service Sigurimi ("Security"). He had no previous experience in the management of the intelligence services. In one of his first interviews he announced the removal of 60% of the personnel coming from the former communist secret service. In June 1996 he was accused of arrest and torture of opposition activists, protesting against the government of the Democratic Party of Albania.

During the riots in Albania in the spring of 1997 after the failure of the Albanian Ponzi schemes, Gazidede led an unsuccessful operation to restore public order. Speaking in a parliamentary questioning session, he blamed the authorities of Greece, the CIA, and the U.S. embassy in Tirana for the creation of the military escalation in the south of the country. Gazidede called on all Albanians to take their share of responsibility for the events, and praised the Greek minority of Albania for non-involvement in the events.

== After 1997 ==
In June 1997, after the election victory of the Socialist Party in Albania, Gazidede left the country to travel to Turkey and Syria. He probably spent time in both countries. On 21 August 1998, the then Attorney General of Albania, Aleksander Goga, issued nine arrest orders against high officials including Gazidede, accused of committing genocide and other crimes against humanity in 1997. Gazidede was also accused of abuse of power and abandonment of duty in face of threat. In July 2003 the investigation against Gazidede was terminated.

In 2005 he returned to Albania after eight years in hiding and joined the administration of Sali Berisha as the vice-president of the Albanian National Real Estate Registration Office. A year later he went twice to Milan, where he was treated for cancer at the expense of the Albanian government, by special decree of Prime Minister Berisha. He died of brain and lung cancer.

He was married to Leta and had two children, a son and a daughter, Besart and Bora.

== Controversies ==
During his tenure up until 1997 and thereafter, critics in both Albania and the western world have alleged that Gazidede had been involved with networking with Muslim extremist groups abroad. The American Foreign Policy Council reported on the notable increase of suspicious Islamic charity organizations, some of whom were linked to Osama bin Laden between the years 1992-94. While tenured as the director of SHIK, Gazidede purportedly made connections to such charities raising suspicions within American intelligence at that time. After 1997, Gazidede fled to Assad’s Syria and then Turkey, remaining in exile until he was pardoned in 2005.
