= Vlora Hyseni =

Albanian intelligence official

Director of SHISH
- In office 3 April 2023 – 23 September 2026
- President: Bajram Begaj
- Prime Minister: Edi Rama
- Preceded by: Helidon Bendo
- Succeeded by: Elvis Lila

Deputy Director of Kosovo Intelligence Agency
- In office February 2019 – 30 June 2021
- President: Hashim Thaçi; Vjosa Osmani
- Prime Minister: Ramush Haradinaj; Albin Kurti
- Director: Kreshnik Gashi; Herself (acting); Petrit Ajeti

Personal details
- Born: 1984 (age 41–42)
- Citizenship: Albanian and Kosovan
- Domestic partner: Ergys Agasi (after 2023)

Military service
- Allegiance: Kosovo (until 2021); Albania (from 2023)
- Branch/service: AKI (until 2021); SHISH (from 2023)
- Years of service: 2010–2021 (AKI); 2023–present (SHISH)

Vlora Hyseni (born in 1984) is an Albanian and Kosovan official who has served as Head of the Albanian Intelligence Service from April 2023 to September 2026, when she was first suspended and later discharged from her duties after a court decision ordered house arrest in graft probe.

== Career ==
On March 17, 2023, Prime Minister Edi Rama nominated Vlora Hyseni to head the State Intelligence Service (SHISH), while the president decreed her on April 3, 2023. Her appointment sparked political reactions and debate at the time regarding her past in Kosovo's intelligence agencies.

Previously, she served as deputy intelligence chief in Kosovo.

== Early life and education ==
Hyseni was born in 1984. She holds advanced degrees in international relations and security studies.

== House arrest and graft allegations ==
On September 22, 2026, a court decision suspended Hyseni and ordered a house arrest on suspicion of disclosing classified information, as part of a wider corruption investigation.
