= Kadare =

Kadare or Kaddare is an Albanian surname. Notable people with the surname include:

- Besiana Kadare (born 1972), Albanian Ambassador to the UN, daughter of Helena and Ismail
- Helena Kadare (born 1943), Albanian author of short stories and novels
- Hussein Sheikh Ahmed Kaddare (1934–2015), Somali inventor
  - Kaddare alphabet
- Ismail Kadare (1936–2024), Albanian novelist, poet, essayist, and playwright, husband of Helena and father of Besiana
  - Kadare Prize
