= Behar Shtylla =

Albanian diplomat (1918–1994)

Minister of Foreign Affairs
- In office 23 July 1953 – 16 March 1966
- Prime Minister: Enver Hoxha; Mehmet Shehu
- Preceded by: Enver Hoxha
- Succeeded by: Nesti Nase

23rd Speaker of the Parliament of Albania
- In office 13 January 1969 – 20 November 1970
- Preceded by: Abdyl Këllezi
- Succeeded by: Fadil Paçrami

Personal details
- Born: March 11, 1918 Korçë, Principality of Albania
- Died: December 8, 1994 (aged 76) Tirana, Albania

Behar Shtylla (11 March 1918 – 8 December 1994) was an Albanian diplomat, member of the Central Committee of the Party of Labour of Albania and Minister of Foreign Affairs from 1953 to 1966.

Shtylla was one of the most experienced and versatile Albanian diplomats, starting as the preferred person of Enver Hoxha to work in Albania's foreign affairs. His first nomination was as a plenipotentiary ambassador in Paris. In 1953 he replaced Enver Hoxha as Foreign Minister, remaining in the post for 13 years until 1966.
