= Fadil Paçrami =

Albanian politician (1922–2008)

24th Speaker of the Parliament of Albania
- In office 20 November 1970 – 25 September 1973

Personal details
- Born: 25 May 1922 Shkodër, Albania
- Died: 16 January 2008 (aged 85)

Fadil Paçrami (May 25, 1922 – January 16, 2008) was an Albanian politician, writer and playwright. He served as Chairman of the Assembly of the Republic of Albania from 20 November 1970 to 25 September 1973. He used to be the minister of education and culture, as well as the speaker of the Albanian parliament. In 1975, he was wrongfully accused of anti-communist activity and got a 25-year sentence. He was freed from prison in 1990 by Ramiz Alia, Enver Hoxha's successor.

== Education and war ==
Fadil was born in Shkodër, into a Muslim family, yet he attended a Catholic college. Later he went to Italy to study medicine in the University of Bologna.

In 1942, Fadil Paçrami had abandoned his education, returned to Albania and joined the communist guerrilla forces. He joined the Albanian Communist Party, which was later renamed to Party of Labour of Albania in 1948. He was an active member of the anti-fascist people's liberation council.

== Political career ==
On the first elections, organized by the communists, Paçrami was elected as a member of the parliament. From 1948 to 1957 he was the chief editor of Zëri i Popullit, ALP's official newspaper. He acted as a witness on the trial of Koçi Xoxe.

From 1950 to 1970 Paçrami was the deputy speaker of the parliament. He was a member of Politburo of the Party of Labour of Albania.

In early 1965 Paçrami was promoted to the position of the minister of education and culture, but he held this position for only a year. From 1970 to 1973 he was the speaker of the Albanian parliament.

Fadil Paçrami was one of the ALP's cultural policy's leading functionaries. He was less dogmatic and totalitarian, than Enver Hoxha and his closest allies. Being a writer and a playwright himself, he was trying to provide as much artistic freedom as possible for other Albanian writers.

== Rock festival and falling out of favor ==
In December 1972, Fadil Pacrami was one of the organizers of Radio Televizioni Shqiptar's Festivali i Këngës music festival. That festival featured beat and rock music, some of the participators were dressed in accordance with modern fashion tendencies. Despite the fact that this festival wasn't any different from other state-organized music festivals in the Eastern Bloc of that time, Enver Hoxha, who was becoming increasingly conservative and nationalistic by that time, got enraged. These kinds of innovations, introduced to the festival, were viewed as being liberal and pro-Western.

In June 1973, a plenary session of the Central Committee of the Party of Labour of Albania was convened, specifically dedicated to the festival and the struggle against the so-called liberal leaners.

Fadil Paçrami and the chief producer of Radio Televizioni Shqiptar Todi Lubonja were heavily criticized. The most harsh accusations came from Enver Hoxha, personally, and from his wife Nexhmije. Soon after that, Paçrami was expelled both from the Union of Writers of Albania and the Party of Labour of Albania under the false accusations of treason against the party and the nation.

On 21 October 1975, Fadil Paçrami was arrested by Sigurimi. In 1977, he was sentenced to 25 years in prison. He served a total 15 years in prison, before he got pardoned.

== Later life ==
Fadil Paçrami was freed from prison in 1990, as Ramiz Alia was conducting anti-totalitarian reforms. After being freed from prison he distanced himself from politics and was mostly engaged in playwriting and other cultural activity.

In 1999, a compilation of Paçrami's plays was published. He died in Tirana, aged 85.
