= Koço Theodhosi =

Albanian politician of the Albanian Party of Labour

9th Minister of Industry and Mines of Albania
- In office 19 July 1954 – 12 June 1955

Minister of Industry and Mines of Albania
- In office 17 March 1966 – 29 May 1975

Personal details
- Born: 21 May 1913 Korçë, Principality of Albania
- Died: 31 May 1977 (aged 64) Tirana, PSR Albania

Koço Theodhosi (21 May 1913 in Korçë – 31 May 1977) was an Albanian politician of the Albanian Party of Labour (PPSh).

== Biography ==
Theodhosi finished the French Lyceum of Korça, and later studied chemistry at the University of Lyon, and at the University of Liège. During his studies he got into contact with French-speaking anti-fascist student group of the French Communist Party (PCF). Upon his return to Albania, he became involved in the anti-fascist movement. In 1936 he joined the Spanish Civil War as part of the international brigades. In April 1939, he was among the organizers of a student protest in Grenoble against the Italian invasion of Albania. It was an appeal to the French Prime Minister Edouard Daladier and the British Prime Minister Neville Chamberlain to gain support over the Italians.

On 8 November 1941, Theodhosi was one of the 200 founding members of the Communist Party of Albania (Alb: Partia Komuniste e Shqipërisë) which would later become the Party of Labour. During the Second World War, he participated as a partisan (1942–44) affiliated with the National Liberation Movement (LANC). In May 1944, he organized a Party Congress in Korçë.

He was among the 118 people comprising the Anti-Fascist Council of National Liberation Movement chosen in May 1944 by the Congress of Përmet. The Council acted as the transitional parliament, and served the Communists in their plans to come to power. In 1944 Theodhosi was appointed by Enver Hoxha as Commissioner of Kuçovë and he served in this position until 1947. After that, he was Deputy Minister of Public Works, before being Deputy Chairman of the State Planning Commission in 1949, under Nako Spiru. In this capacity, he also participated in delegations to the Soviet Union together with Hoxha.

In 1950, Theodhosi was elected member of the People's Assembly (Alb: Kuvendi Popullor), where he remained until 30 May 1975. Furthermore, he was for many years a member of the Central Committee (CC) of the Party.

In 1954, he was appointed Minister of Industry in the government of Prime Minister Mehmet Shehu, before becoming Deputy Chairman of the Council of Ministers in 1955.

At the 3rd Congress of the Party of Labourt of Albania in June 1956, he was elected candidate-member of its Politburo.

On 1 March 1959, he was appointed as Chairman of the State Planning Commission in the government of Prime Minister Shehu, and held this function until 18 March 1966. At the same time, from 16 July 1962 to 18 March 1966, he served as Deputy Chairman of the Council of Ministers. In addition, on 1 January 1965 he was appointed as the successor of Adil Çarçani as Minister of Industry and held that office until 30 October 1974.

During the 6th Congress of the Party in November 1971, he became member of the Politburo of the PPSh, a very high-ranking position which he lost almost four years later by his dismissal in September 1975. From 30 October 1974 to 1 September 1975, he served again as Minister of Industry and Mines in the government of Mehmet Shehu.

After his dismissal in September 1975, he was succeeded by Pali Miska both as a member of the Politburo of the PPSh and as Minister of Industry and Mines. Theodhosi was arrested and personally instigated by the Minister of Interior Kadri Hazbiu, who was also chief supervisor of the Sigurimi (secret service).

The reasons for his dismissal were stated to be his errors in the construction of the hydroelectric power station of Fierza and the metallurgical complex near Elbasan. An important additional reason for his overthrow was the accusation of military and economic conspiracy. Also accused were other high-ranking military figures: Minister of Defence General Beqir Balluku; the Chief of the General Staff of the Armed Forces (Alb: Forcat e Armatosura të Shqipërisë) General Petrit Dume; the head of the General Political Bureau of the Armed Forces, General Hito Çako; Deputy Prime Minister Abdyl Këllezi; Lipe Nashi; and others. They all fell victim to the accusation of being too close to the Soviet Union, the Prime Minister of the People's Republic of China Zhou Enlai, and Yugoslavia.

In 1977, Theodhosi was condemned to death and executed.

His son Arben Theodhosi, who was a painter with several exhibitions in Albania and abroad, had to interrupt his studies when he was detained for forced labor in one of the copper mines.

== See also ==
- Mehmet Shehu
- Petro Marko
