= Kadri Hazbiu =

Albanian politician (1922–1983)

Minister of Internal Affairs
- In office 23 July 1954 – 27 December 1979
- President: Haxhi Lleshi
- Prime Minister: Mehmet Shehu
- Preceded by: Mehmet Shehu
- Succeeded by: Feçor Shehu

Minister of People's Defence
- In office 15 January 1982 – 23 November 1982
- Preceded by: Mehmet Shehu
- Succeeded by: Prokop Murra

Personal details
- Born: 15 July 1922 Mavrovë, Albania
- Died: 10 September 1983 (aged 61) Tiranë, Albania
- Cause of death: Execution by firing squad
- Party: Party of Labour of Albania

Kadri Hazbiu (15 July 1922 – 10 September 1983) was an Albanian politician of the Albanian Party of Labour (PPSh).

== Biography ==
=== Early life ===
Kadri Hazbiu was born in Mavrovë, Vlorë District, on 15 July 1922. He was the son of Hasbi Cano Dautaj, a local leader during the Vlora War in 1920. He attended a commercial school and graduated from it in 1942. By that time he joined the Second World War from 1942 to 1944, affiliated with the communist and anti-fascist side of the National Liberation Movement.

=== Career ===
After the founding of the People's Republic of Albania on 11 January 1946, he was elected Colonel Chief of Section of Counterintelligence in the Directorate for External Security. Later Hazbiu graduated from the Moscow Higher Military Command School in Moscow.

In 1950, he was elected to the People's Assembly and was a member of it until 15 October 1982. He was the chief of the Directorate of State Security (the Sigurimi), Albania's secret police, and Deputy Internal Affairs Minister from 1950 to 1954.

On 23 July 1954, he was the successor to Mehmet Shehu (who became prime minister) as the Minister of Internal Affairs. He held this post for almost 26 years, until 26 April 1980. He was also the chief supervisor of the Secret Service Sigurimi, which was subordinate to the Ministry of Internal Affairs. In 1957, he was promoted to Lieutenant General.

During the 4th Congress of PPSh in February 1961, Hazbiu became the candidate-member of the Politburo of the Party of Labour of Albania. In this capacity, he visited the People's Republic of China during the Cultural Revolution, in 1966 and 1968.

In November 1971, at the 6th Party Congress, he was elevated to a member of the Politburo. He remained within the supreme governing body of the PPSh until his resignation on 13 October 1982.

As Internal Affairs Minister during the mid-1970s, he was instrumental in the dismissal, arrest, and execution of the alleged conspirators of the military-economic spectrum, such as Beqir Balluku, Petrit Dume, Hito Çako, Abdyl Këllezi, Koço Theodhosi, Kiço Ngjela, and Lipe Nashi.

On 26 April 1980, he became the successor of Mehmet Shehu, who remained Prime Minister, and finally Defense Minister while Feçor Shehu succeeded him as Internal Affairs Minister. Hazbiu's appointment as Defense Minister was surprising, but followed a direct decision taken by the First Secretary of the PPSh Enver Hoxha, and F. Shehu's incapability to compare with major Defense Department Deputy Ministers' experience (Llambi Gegprifti, Nazar Berberi, Maliq Sadushi, or Veli Llakaj wanted to run for the post).

=== Demise ===
On 15 October 1982, Hazbiu was arrested and lost his membership in the People's Assembly and in the Politburo. On 23 November 1982, he was officially replaced by Prokop Murra as Minister of Defence, the first civilian to hold such a post in the People's Republic of Albania.

Shortly after Hazbiu's trial (and about a year after Mehmet Shehu's suicide on 17 December 1981) numerous other Party and State figures were arrested and convicted in 1983 in secret trials, including Shehu's wife Fiqret and his sons, former Internal Affairs Minister Feçor Shehu, who had long worked in management positions in the intelligence Sigurimi, most recently as its director, other senior intelligence officials, Foreign Minister Nesti Nase, and the Minister of Health Llambi Ziçishti. All were under Shehu's line of influence, and were accused of relations with the CIA, the Yugoslav UDB, and the KGB, allegedly having plotted a coup d'etat for the liquidation of Hoxha.

Incriminating statements were extracted under torture. Nevertheless, Hazbiu and Feçor Shehu could not be forced to admit the absurd accusations. Several defendants were executed, and the others were sentenced to long prison terms.

Hazbiu was executed on 15 September 1983 in Linzë near Tirana. Twelve years after his death, his body was exhumed and buried at the family's request on 4 November 1995 in Selitë near Tirana.

== Personal life ==
Hazbiu was married and had 5 children. His youngest, Agron (born in 1959), became a title-winning footballer with Dinamo Tirana in 1980 under the name Agron Dautaj. His career ended in 1982 when his father was arrested and Agron was interned in Kurbnesh with the other family members. His death on 28 January 1989 in one of the Kurbnesh mines was deemed a suicide by the communist rulers.

Preceded by Mehmet Shehu	Minister of Internal Affairs of Albania; 1954–1979	Succeeded by Feçor Shehu
