= Claude Durand =

French publisher, translator and writer

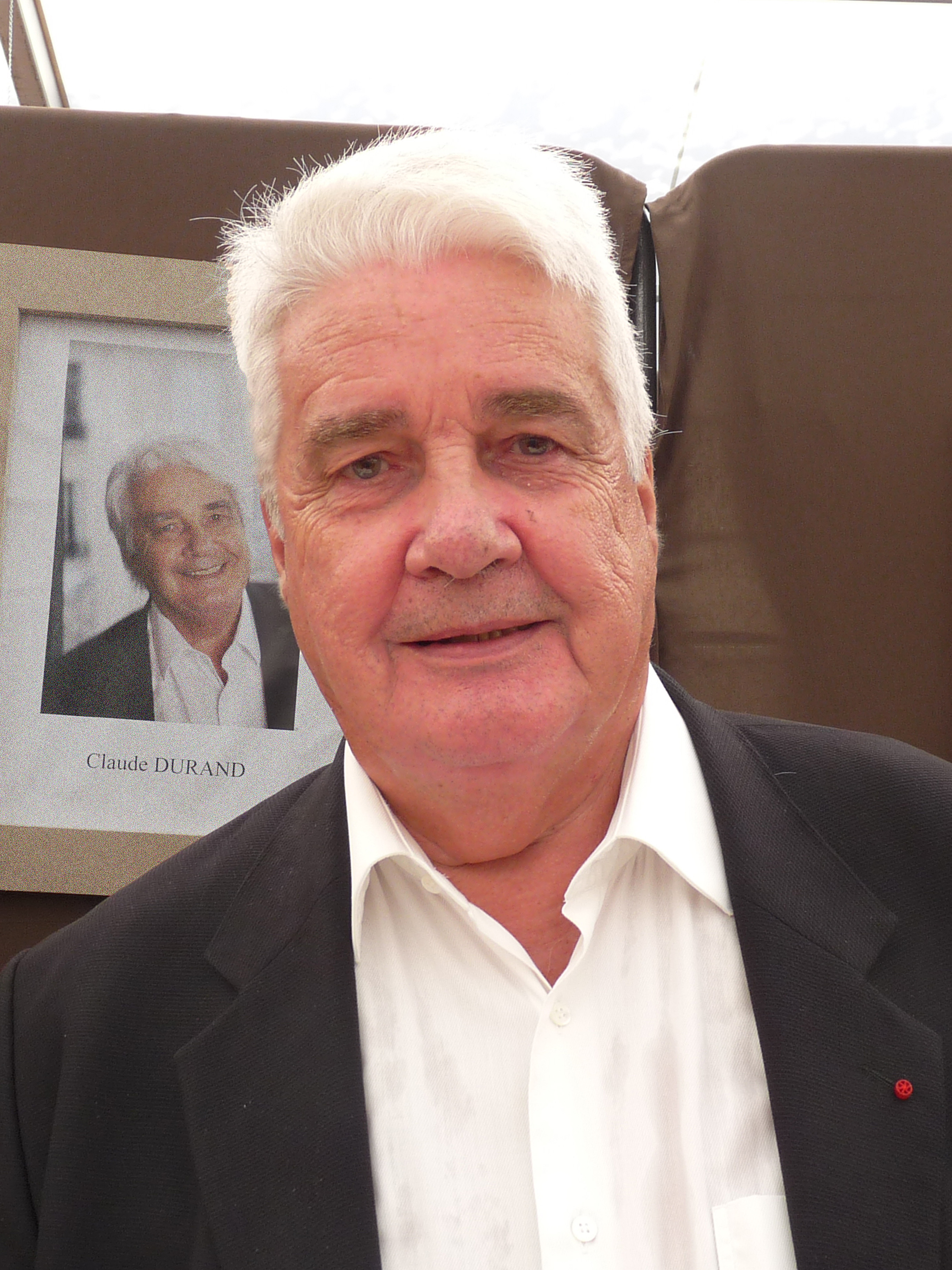
Claude Durand in 2011

Claude Durand (1938–2015) was a French publisher, translator and writer. He worked in the French film industry editing films and occasionally writing and directing.

He published leading authors such as Solzhenitsyn and Houellebecq, and together with his wife Carmen, he translated the standard French edition of Gabriel García Márquez's novel One Hundred Years of Solitude. As a writer, he won the 1979 Prix Médicis for his novel La Nuit zoologique.

As Solzhenitsyn's literary agent (Editions Fayard) since 2003 he acted as an intermediary with "Moscow" when Edward Ericson Jr. and Daniel Mahoney were preparing The Solzhenitsyn Reader. A substantial part of the notes (remarks) on the Journal of the Red Wheel are of his hand.

== Selected filmography ==
- Anyone Can Kill Me (1957)
- Folies-Bergère (1957)
- Nathalie, Secret Agent (1959)

== Publications ==
- Agent de Soljenitsyne (Fayard, Paris 2011).
