= Linzë =

- Village
- Location within Albania
- Coordinates: 41°21′N 19°53′E
- Country: Albania
- County: Tirana
- Municipality: Tirana
- Administrative unit: Dajt
- Time zone: UTC+1 (CET)
  - Summer (DST): UTC+2 (CEST)

Linzë is a village in the former municipality of Dajt in Tirana County, Albania. At the 2015 local government reform it became part of the municipality Tirana.

== Demographic history ==
the village of Linzë (Lunza) appears in the Ottoman defter of 1467 as a part of the timar of Bahadır in the nahiyah of Benda. The settlement had a total of eight households which were represented by: Pelgrin, Uksiçi son of Pelgrini, Gjoni son of Pali, Gjergj Bisari, Kola Bisari, Engjëll Bisari, Gjon Bisari, and Gjon Martolosi.
