= Bilbil Klosi =

Albanian lawyer and judge

Justice Minister of Albania
- In office 5 March 1951 – 13 September 1966
- Prime Minister: Enver Hoxha; Mehmet Shehu
- Preceded by: Manol Konomi
- Succeeded by: Enver Halili

Personal details
- Born: 25 January 1915 Klos, Mallakastër, Albania
- Died: November 22, 1978 (aged 63) Tirana, Albania
- Party: Party of Labour of Albania
- Children: Ardian Klosi

Bilbil Klosi (25 January 1915 – 22 November 1978) was an Albanian politician and public prosecutor during the Communist Albania period. Among other duties, he served as Minister of Justice from 1951 to 1966.

Klosi was born in the village of Klos, located in the Mallakastër region. He studied in the French Lyceum of Korçë, which he finished in 1938. Then he went to France to study at the University of Grenoble where he studied law. After graduating there in 1942, he returned to Albania where he joined the National Liberation Movement and got involved with the Albanian resistance.

After the end of World War II, he served in various prosecution positions; a military one during March–April 1945, deputy public prosecutor until 1949, and public prosecutor later until 1952. In 1952, he became Minister of Justice, being replaced as public prosecutor by Sotir Qiriaqi. Klosi remained as Minister of Justice until 14 October 1966.

He served as Representative in the National Assembly from 1945 to 1973, and was also Secretary of the Presidium during 1966–1973. After 1973 he served as advisory. As advisory of the Supreme Court, Klosi contributed in drafting the Albanian Constitution of 1976.

Klosi was directly involved and led many political trials that were brought in post-World War II Albania, starting with the Special Court of Albania, 1945. Many political figures were prosecuted and condemned in these trials, with a substantial part of them being executed. As such, he was not a popular figure in Albania. He urged for strict and harsh sentences, "even harder than the Russian SFSR Penal Code ones".

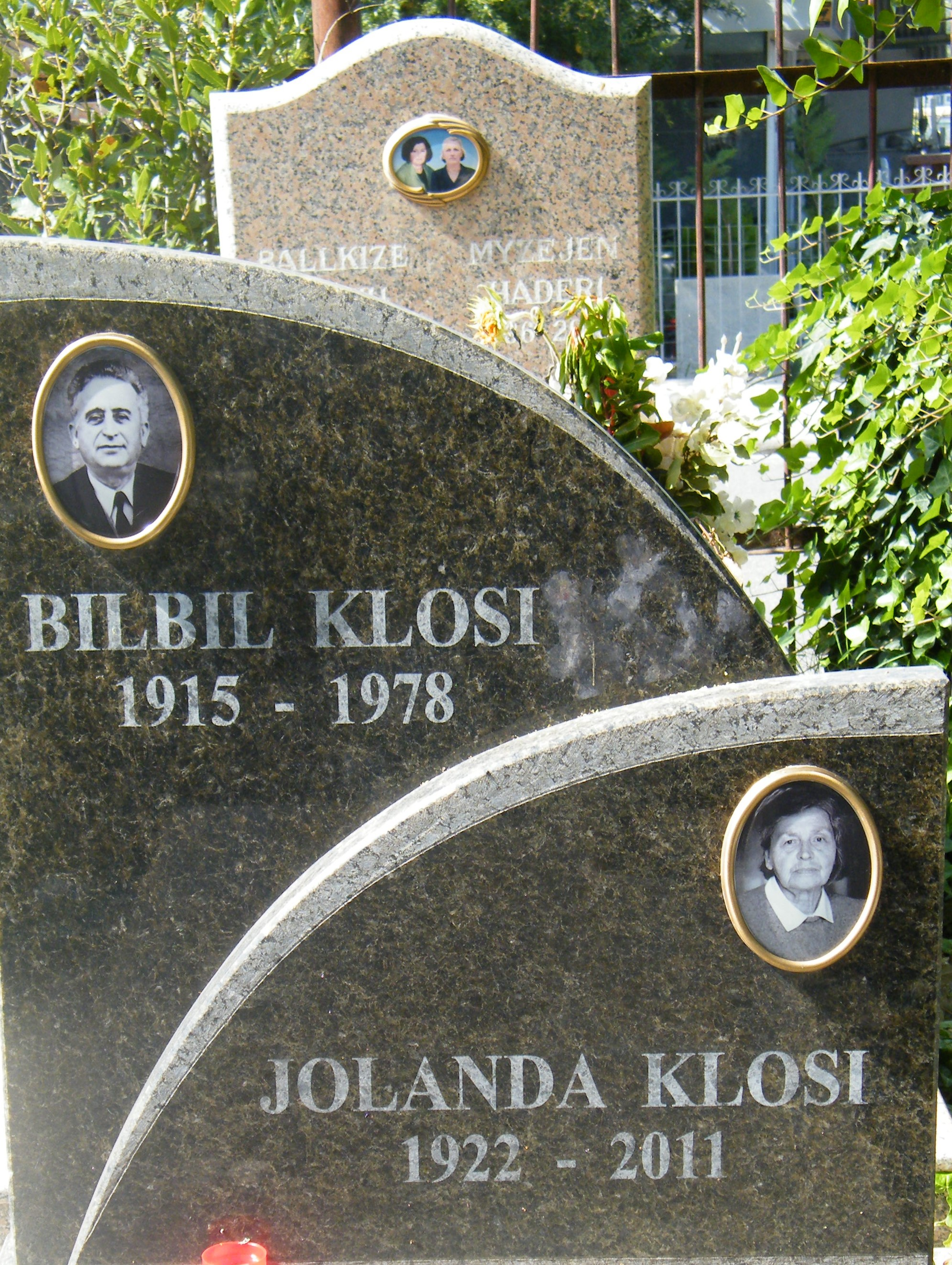
Grave of Bilbil Klosi

Klosi was the father of Ardian Klosi, an Albanian scholar.

== See also ==
- Koçi Xoxe
