= Sigurimi =

Albanian secret police

Directorate of State Security
- Drejtoria e Sigurimit të Shtetit

Agency overview
- Formed: 10 December 1944
- Dissolved: 15 August 1991
- Superseding agency: SHIK
- Headquarters: Tirana, People's Socialist Republic of Albania
- Motto: "Për popullin, me popullin" ("For the people, with the people")
- Parent agency: People's Socialist Republic of Albania

The Directorate of State Security (Albanian: Drejtoria e Sigurimit të Shtetit, DSSh), commonly called the Sigurimi ("Security"), was the state security, intelligence and secret police service of the People's Socialist Republic of Albania. Its proclaimed goal was maintaining state security of Albania, which meant it de facto also served to suppress opposing political activity among the populace and preserve the existing political system. It was regarded as one of the most feared, most repressive, and most brutal secret police agencies to ever exist.

In 2008 the Albanian parliament discussed opening the so-called "Sigurimi files", but the Socialist Party of Albania contested it. A government commission, created in 2015, has been assigned the task of publicizing the Sigurimi files and identifying candidates for public office who had collaborated with the communist regime; however, as of early 2017, the commission has not yet started its work, and critics have pointed out that most of the files were probably destroyed long ago.

== History ==
While recent data places the Sigurimi's official foundation on 10 December 1944 as the OZNA ('Department for Protection of the People'), historian Robert Elsie has argued that its organisational roots go as far back as 19 March 1943. Enver Hoxha credited the Sigurimi as instrumental in his faction's ability to gain power over other Albanian partisan groups. The People's Defense Division, formed in 1945 from Haxhi Lleshi's most reliable resistance fighters, was the precursor to the Sigurimi's 5,000-strong uniformed internal security force.

In 1989 the division was organized into five regiments of mechanized infantry that could be ordered to quell any domestic disturbances posing a threat to the Party of Labour of Albania leadership. The Sigurimi had an estimated 30,000 officers, approximately 7,500 of them assigned to the People's Army.

The organization ceased to exist in name in July 1991 and was replaced by the SHIK (National Informative Service). In early 1992, information on the organization, responsibilities, and functions of the SHIK was not available in Western publications. Some Western observers believed, however, that many of the officers and leaders of the SHIK had served in the Sigurimi and that the basic structures of the two organizations were similar.

== Activities ==
The mission of the Sigurimi was to prevent counterrevolutions and to suppress opposition to the existing political system. Although the West sought the support of groups of Albanian émigrés for their efforts to overthrow the social government in the late 1940s and early 1950s, they quickly ceased to be a credible threat because of the effectiveness of the Sigurimi.

The activities of the Sigurimi were directed more toward political and ideological opposition than crimes against persons or property, unless the latter were sufficiently serious and widespread to threaten the regime. Its activities permeated Albanian society to the extent that every third citizen had either served time in labor camps or been interrogated by Sigurimi officers. Sigurimi personnel were generally career volunteers, recommended by loyal party members and subjected to careful political and psychological screening before they were selected to join the service. They had an elite status and enjoyed many privileges designed to maintain their reliability and dedication to the party.

== Organization ==
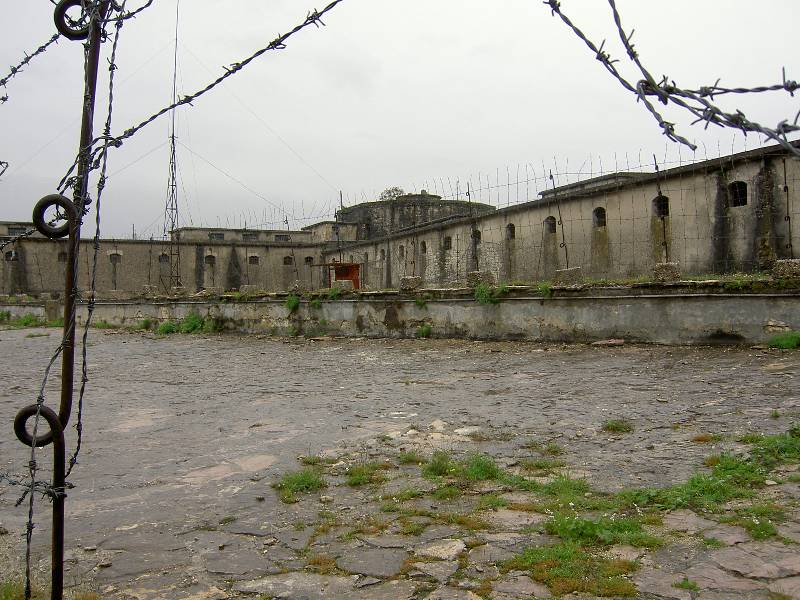
Former political prison in Gjirokastër. During Hoxha's regime political executions were common, and 988 people were killed by the regime and many more were sent to labour camps or persecuted.

The Sigurimi had a national headquarters and district headquarters in each of Albania's twenty-six districts.

It was further organized into sections covering political control, censorship, public records, prison camps, internal security troops, physical security, counterespionage, and foreign intelligence.

The political control section's primary function was monitoring the ideological correctness of party members and other citizens. It was responsible for purging the party, government, military, and its own apparatus of individuals closely associated with Yugoslavia, the Soviet Union, or China after Albania broke from successive alliances with each of those countries. One estimate indicated that at least 170 communist party Politburo or Central Committee members were executed as a result of the Sigurimi's investigations. The political control section was also involved in an extensive program of monitoring private telephone conversations.

The censorship section operated within the press, radio, newspapers, and other communications media as well as within cultural societies, schools, and other organizations.

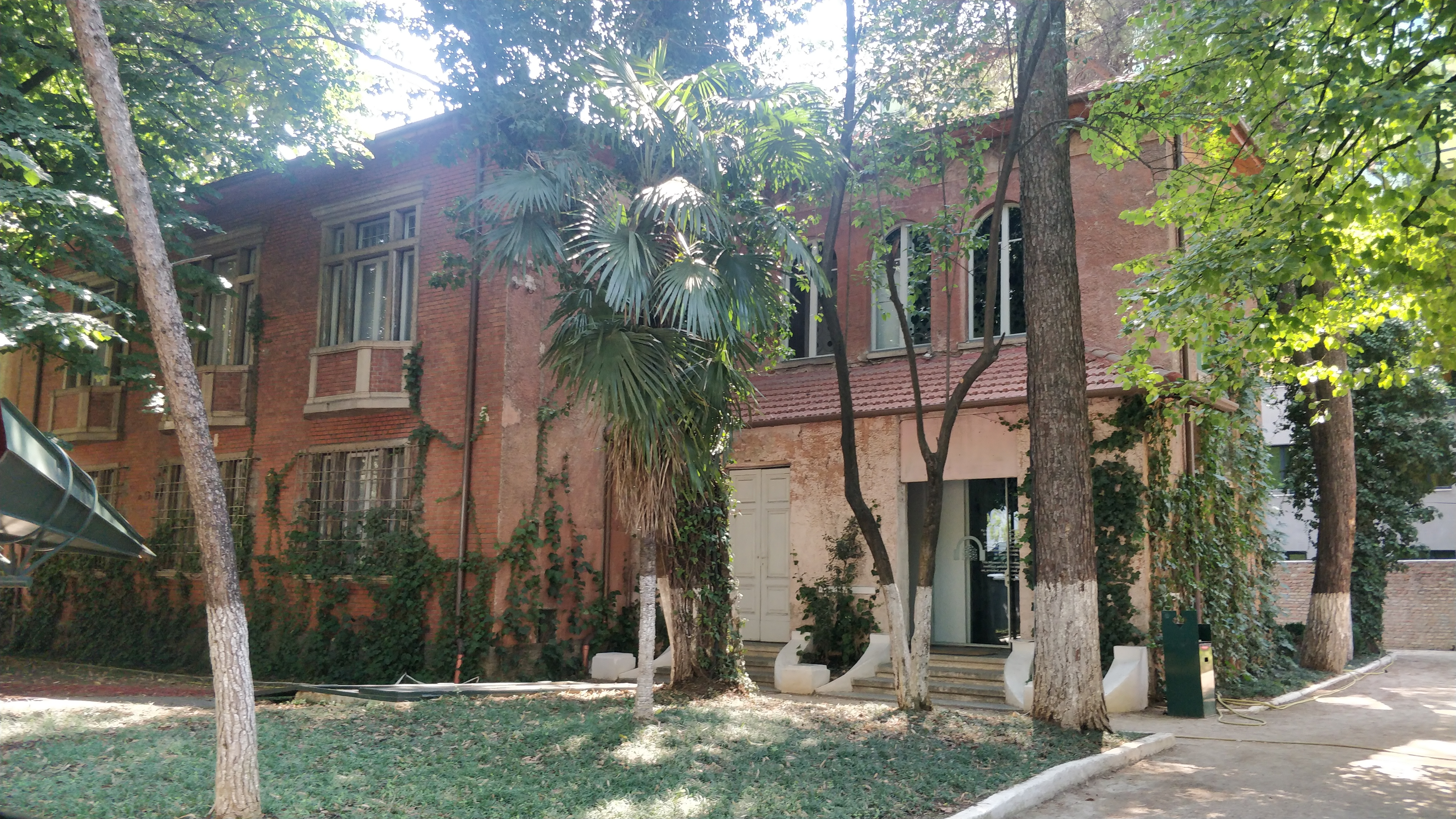
Museum of Leaves in Tirana, Albania

The public records section administered government documents and statistics, primarily social and economic statistics that were handled as state secrets.

The prison camps section was charged with the political reeducation of inmates and the evaluation of the degree to which they posed a danger to society. Local police supplied guards for fourteen prison camps throughout the country.

The physical security section provided guards for important party and government officials and installations.

The counterespionage section was responsible for neutralizing foreign intelligence operations in Albania as well as domestic movements and parties opposed to the Party of Labour of Albania.

Finally, the foreign intelligence section maintained personnel abroad and at home to obtain intelligence about foreign capabilities and intentions that affected Albania's national security. Its officers occupied cover positions in Albania's foreign diplomatic missions, trade offices, and cultural centers.

== Directors ==
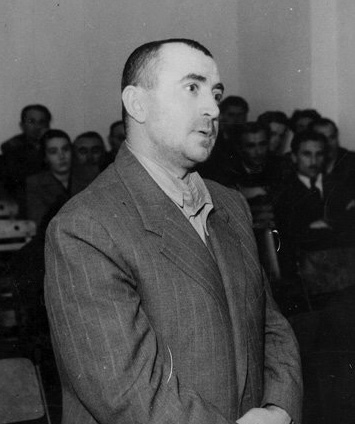
Koçi Xoxe

No.	Name	Term in office
1	Koçi Xoxe	14 December 1944	22 March 1946
2	Nesti Kerenxhi	2 April 1946	February 1948
3	Vaskë Koleci	8 March 1948	30 October 1948
4	Beqir Ndou	1 November 1948	9 March 1949
5	Kadri Hazbiu	9 March 1950	1 August 1954
6	Mihallaq Ziqishti	1 August 1954	4 May 1962
7	Rexhep Kolli	5 May 1962	15 May 1967
8	Feçor Shehu	15 May 1967	31 December 1969
9	Lelo Sinaj	1 January 1970	15 May 1972
10	Muço Saliu	16 May 1972	28 February 1974
–	Feçor Shehu	1 March 1974	15 January 1980
11	Kadri Gojashi	16 January 1980	4 April 1982
–	Rexhep Kolli	4 April 1982	23 June 1982
12	Pëllumb Kapo	24 June 1982	15 October 1982
13	Zylyftar Ramizi	16 October 1982	31 March 1987
14	Zef Loka	1 April 1987	15 February 1988
–	Zylyftar Ramizi	15 February 1988	31 January 1989
15	Frederik Ymeri	1 February 1989	31 August 1990
16	Nerulla Zebi	31 August 1990	15 August 1991

== See also ==
- AIDSSH
- SHIK
- SHISH
- Museum of Secret Surveillance
- Operation Valuable
