= Abdyl Këllezi =

Albanian politician

22nd Speaker of the Parliament of Albania
- In office 10 September 1966 – 13 January 1969

Personal details
- Born: 20 August 1919 Tirana, Albania
- Died: 17 June 1977 (aged 57) Albania
- Party: Party of Labour

Abdyl Këllezi (20 August 1919 – 17 May 1977) was an Albanian politician of the Communist era. He served as Chairman of the Assembly of the Republic of Albania from 10 September 1966 to 13 January 1969.

== Life and activity ==
Këllezi was born in Tirana on 20 August 1919. He studied business administration in the University of Florence, and later pursued military studies in Rome. Due to his anti-fascist activities he was arrested in 1939 and interned in the famous Ventotene. He stayed there until 1941, but was arrested again soon-after in 1942 and spent some more time in prison. After his release, he joined the LANC for what remained from World War II, while being elected member of the General Council of LANC since 1943. In 1944 Këllezi was member of the military general staff of the new government.
From 1945 to 1946 he served as Director of the newly re-established Albanian State Bank. Afterwards he held several positions: Minister of Finance during 1948-1953 and 1954–1958, Chairman of the State Planning Commission 1968–1975, Deputy Prime Minister June 1958–March 1966, Chairman of the Sino-Albanian Friendship Association 1959–1975, member of the Central Committee of the Labor Party of Albania from June 1956 to 1975, and member of the Politburo of the Party of Labour of Albania 1971–1975, and Chairman of the Parliament of Albania from September 1966 to January 1969.

== Demise ==
In 1975, together with Kiço Ngjela (Minister of Trade) and Koço Theodhosi (Minister of Industry and Mines), Këllezi was accused of "grave revisionist mistakes". His sentence included having infiltrated agents of UDBA disguised as trade officials, having favored Yugoslavia in the Albanian-Yugoslavian commerce, having tried to sabotage Self-Reliance by pushing unnecessary trade with Western countries, as well as Asian and African "Revisionist" countries, etc. The seventh congress of the Labour Party (26–29 May 1975) marked his fate. He was released from all duties, arrested and later executed.
