= Mehmet Shehu =

Prime Minister of Albania From 1954 to 1981

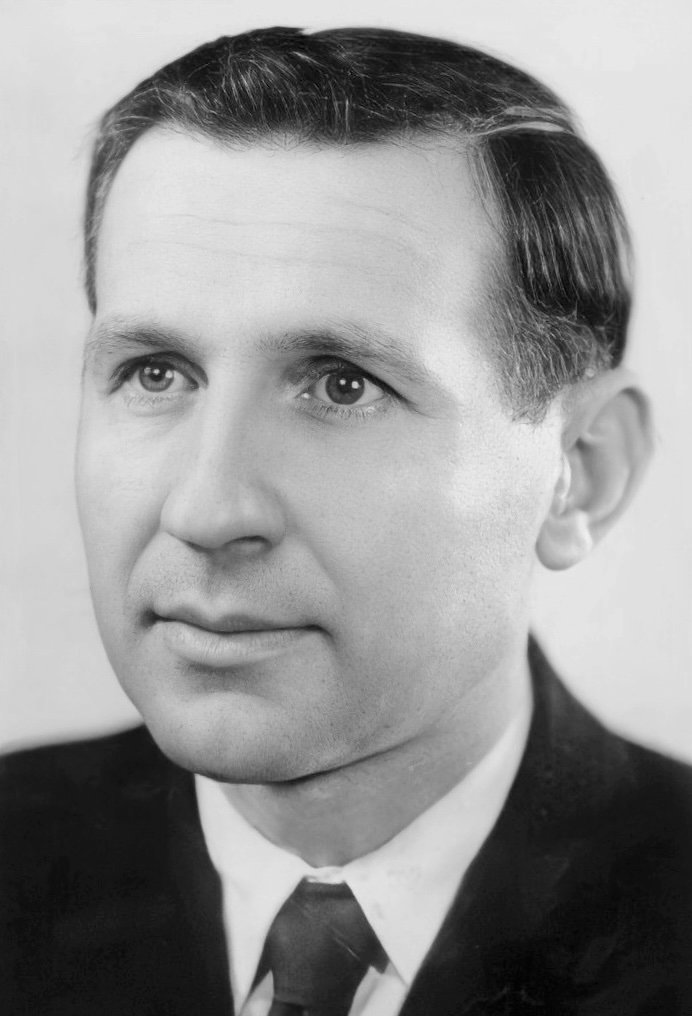
- Official portrait, c. 1950s

23rd Prime Minister of Albania
- In office 20 July 1954 – 17 December 1981
- Leader: Enver Hoxha (First Secretary)
- Preceded by: Enver Hoxha
- Succeeded by: Adil Çarçani

Minister of Internal Affairs
- In office 23 November 1948 – 23 July 1954
- Prime Minister: Enver Hoxha
- Preceded by: Nesti Kerenxhi
- Succeeded by: Kadri Hazbiu

Minister of People's Defence
- In office 28 October 1974 – 17 December 1981
- Prime Minister: Himself
- Preceded by: Beqir Balluku
- Succeeded by: Kadri Hazbiu

Personal details
- Born: Mehmet Ismail Shehu; January 10, 1913 Çorrush, Albania
- Died: December 17, 1981 (aged 68) Tirana, Albania
- Cause of death: Suicide, Assassination (allegedly)
- Party: Party of Labour of Albania
- Other political affiliations: Communist Party of Spain
- Spouse: Fiqrete Sanxhaktari

Military service
- Battles/wars: Spanish Civil War; World War II in Albania; Battle of Gjorm; Liberation of Tepelena; Liberation of Tirana; Cold War; Operation Valuable; Albanian–Yugoslav border conflict

Mehmet Ismail Shehu (January 10, 1913 – December 17, 1981) was an Albanian communist politician who served as the Prime Minister of the People's Socialist Republic of Albania from 1954 to 1981. He was known as a close confidant of Enver Hoxha and served in various high-ranking positions in the government.

Shehu was Chief of the General Staff of the Albanian People's Army from 1946 to 1948 and later served as Minister of the Interior from 1948 to 1954. He then assumed the position of Chairman of the Council of Ministers (Prime Minister) from 1954 to 1981 and additionally served as Minister of People's Defense from 1974 to 1980. Shehu was often regarded as the right hand of Enver Hoxha and played a central role in Albania's political leadership during that era.

In 1938, he joined the International Brigades during the Spanish Civil War. He fought as an officer in the 4th Battalion of the Italian Garibaldi Brigade. A member of the Communist Party of Spain, he moved to France after Franco's victory and was interned there from 1939 to 1942. He was handed over by the Vichy government to the fascists who sent him to Tirana. He left the company of his escort and joined the maquis and the Albanian Communist Party. Commander of the 1st Brigade of the National Liberation Army since 1943, Mehmet Shehu took part in the Battle of Gjorm on January 1, Liberation of Tepelena on September 10 and liberation of Tirana on November 8, 1944.

As an acknowledged military tactician, without whose leadership the communist partisans may well have failed in their battle to win Albania for the Marxist-Leninist cause, Shehu exhibited an ideological understanding and work ethic that singled him out for rapid promotion in the communist party.

Shehu shared power with Enver Hoxha from the end of the Second World War. According to official Albanian government sources, he killed himself on December 17, 1981, after which his family was arrested.

== Early life ==
Shehu was born into an Albanian family, with his father being an Albanian Muslim imam. He was born in Çorrush, Mallakastër District, southern Albania.

Shehu graduated in 1932 at the Tirana Albanian Vocational High School funded by the American Red Cross. His focus was on agriculture. Unsuccessful in finding employment within the Ministry of Agriculture he managed to get a scholarship to attend the Nunziatella military academy of Naples, Italy. After being expelled from this school for his pro-Communist sympathies in 1936 he gained entry to the Tirana Officers School, but he left the following year after volunteering to fight for the republican side in the Spanish Civil War. He joined the Communist Party of Spain and was a machine-gunner who rose to the command of the Fourth Battalion of the XIIth Garibaldi Brigade. After the defeat of the Republican forces he was arrested in France in early 1939 as he was retreating from Spain along with his friends. He was imprisoned in an internment camp in France and later was transferred to an Italian internment camp, where he joined the Italian Communist Party.

== Partisan life ==
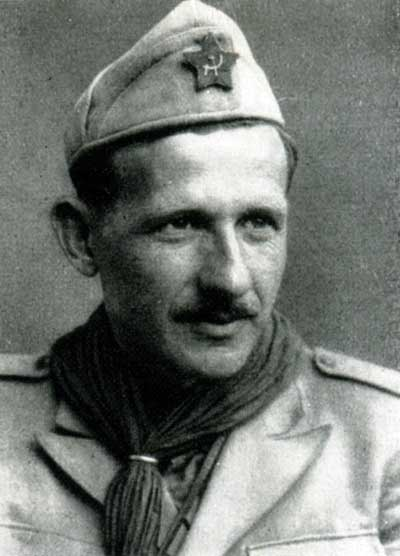
Mehmet Shehu as a partisan, 1944

Shehu volunteered for the war in Spain, illegally crossing the border between France and Spain in November 1937. Once in Spain, he joined the 13th Interbrigade (the Garibaldi Brigade) and quickly rose to become the Deputy Commander of the 4th Battalion of the Garibaldi Brigade. He became a member of the Spanish Communist Party in December 1937.

After the war in Spain, when the International Brigades and the Spanish Republican Army withdrew to France, Shehu was interned on February 9, 1939, in a French concentration camp by the governments of Daladier, Paul Reynaud, and Pétain. He remained there for 40 months and became a member of the Party Committee of the camp.

Shehu's military career began in 1942 when he returned to Albania under Italian occupation and promptly joined the Albanian Communist Party and the Albanian resistance in Mallakastra. He was regarded as highly successful and victorious in battles such as Gjorm, Tepelena, and Tirana. By 1943, he had been elected as a candidate member of the Central Committee of the Communist Party. Due to his military expertise, he quickly rose to become the commander of the 1st Partisan Assault Brigade in August 1943. Subsequently, he led the 1st Partisan Assault Division of the National Liberation Army. He served as a member of the Anti-Fascist Council of National Liberation, the provisional government, from 1944 to 1945.

In 1944, he was promoted to Major General and became the Second Assistant to the Chief of Staff.

== Military career ==
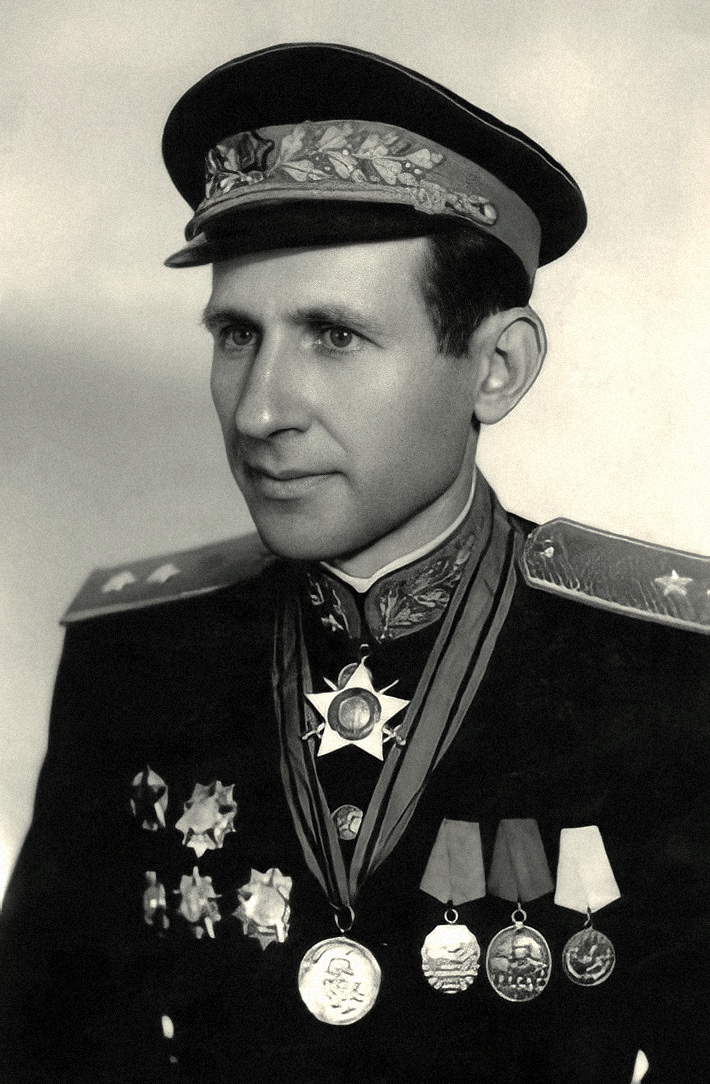
Mehmet Shehu as Chief of the General Staff of the Albanian People's Army in 1946

After Albania was liberated from the German occupation in November 1944, Shehu became the deputy chief of the general staff and, after he studied in Moscow, became the chief of the general staff. Later, he was also a lieutenant general and a full general.

In 1948, Shehu "expurgated" from the party the element who "tried to separate Albania from the Soviet Union and lead her under Belgrade's influence". This made him the nearest person to Enver Hoxha and brought him high offices. After the purge of Koçi Xoxe, he took over the Ministry of Internal Affairs. However, he remained in Hoxha's shadow.

From 1948, he was a member of the Central Committee and the Politburo of the Party of Labour of Albania, and, from 1948 to 1953, he was a secretary of the Central Committee. He lost the latter position on June 24 when Enver Hoxha gave up the posts of Minister of Defence and Minister of Foreign Affairs while retaining the premiership. Hoxha was probably not willing to yield too much power to him. From 1948 to 1954 he was deputy prime minister (deputy chairman of the Council of Ministers) and Minister of Internal Affairs. The latter post made him commander of the secret police, the Sigurimi. In 1954, he succeeded Hoxha as Prime Minister. From 1974 he was also the Minister of People's Defence while from 1947 to his death he was a deputy of the People's Assembly.

== Hard line man ==
During the war, Shehu won a reputation for brutality. Mike Burke, the American spymaster who set up a 1950 paramilitary project to destabilize and oust the Albanian government, said in 1986 that Shehu was "one tough son of a bitch", whose security forces gave U.S. agents "a tough time".

During the discussion at the Meeting of 81 Communist and Workers' Parties in November 1960, Nikita Khrushchev asked Shehu if he had any criticisms of Joseph Stalin, to which Shehu replied: "Yes, not getting rid of you!"

== Last years ==
Shehu was considered Enver Hoxha's right-hand man and he was also considered the second most powerful man in Albania. For 40 years, Hoxha was Shehu's friend and closest comrade. On his 50th birthday in 1963, Hoxha honored Shehu by attaching his name to the name of the local military-political academy, it was named the "Mehmet Shehu Military Academy". Shehu was one of those who formed the Chinese-Albanian alliance and initiated the break with the Soviet Union (December 1961). His relationship with Hoxha was damaged, however, when his son married a woman who had anti-Communist relatives who lived in the United States. This situation led to a meeting of the Politburo with regard to his future.

On December 17, 1981, he was found dead in his bedroom, (lying in his bed, wearing sunglasses, a shirt and pyjamas) with a bullet wound to his chest. According to the official announcement on Radio Tirana, he killed himself in a nervous breakdown. Many of his contemporaries, including his personal bodyguard, have repeatedly claimed that he was murdered. No official investigation into the matter has been conducted since the fall of the regime.

After his death, Shehu was accused of spying, not only for Yugoslavia, but also for the CIA and the KGB as well. In Hoxha's book The Titoites (1982) several chapters are dedicated to Shehu's denunciation. In 1982, the 'Party of Labour' issued a second edition of its official history, removing all references to Shehu.

Reportedly, Shehu had begun to denounce Hoxha's isolationism. He had reached out to the governments of some western nations like Italy, the United Kingdom and Germany in an attempt to form diplomatic ties with them. Albanians speculated that Hoxha, who was in the last years of his life, wanted to secure his legacy and he did not want a successor who might outshine him. He was denounced as a “people’s enemy” and he was buried in a wasteland near the village of Ndroq near Tirana.

Shehu’s family was also punished. His widow, Fiqerete, (born Sanxhaktari) and two of his sons were arrested without any explanation and later they were imprisoned on different pretexts. One son died by suicide and his widow died in prison in 1988. One of Shehu's surviving sons later launched a campaign to prove that his father had, in fact, been murdered. After the fall of Communism and after his release from prison in 1991, Mehmet Shehu's younger son Bashkim started a search for his father's remains. On November 19, 2001, it was announced that Mehmet Shehu's remains had been found.

A fictionalised account of Shehu's fall and death is the subject of Ismail Kadare's novel The Successor (2003).

== Ideology ==
During his leadership, Shehu was often characterized as a nationalist figure with a staunch anti-Yugoslavist and anti-Revisionist stance Additionally, his ideology was sometimes perceived as reflecting elements of bourgeois nationalism.

== See also ==
- History of Albania
- People's Socialist Republic of Albania

== Bibliography ==
- Shehu, Duro. Mehmet Shehu: Im vëlla, Tirana, Bota Shqiptare: 2008.

Political offices
Preceded by Enver Hoxha	Chairman of the Council of Ministers of Albania; 1954–1981	Succeeded by Adil Çarçani
