= Kaceli =

Kaceli is a surname. Notable people with the surname include:

- Sadik Kaceli (1914–2000), Albanian painter
- Jonuz Kaceli (1908–1951), Albanian businessman
