= Operation Valuable =

Western covert paramilitary operation

- Part of the Cold War
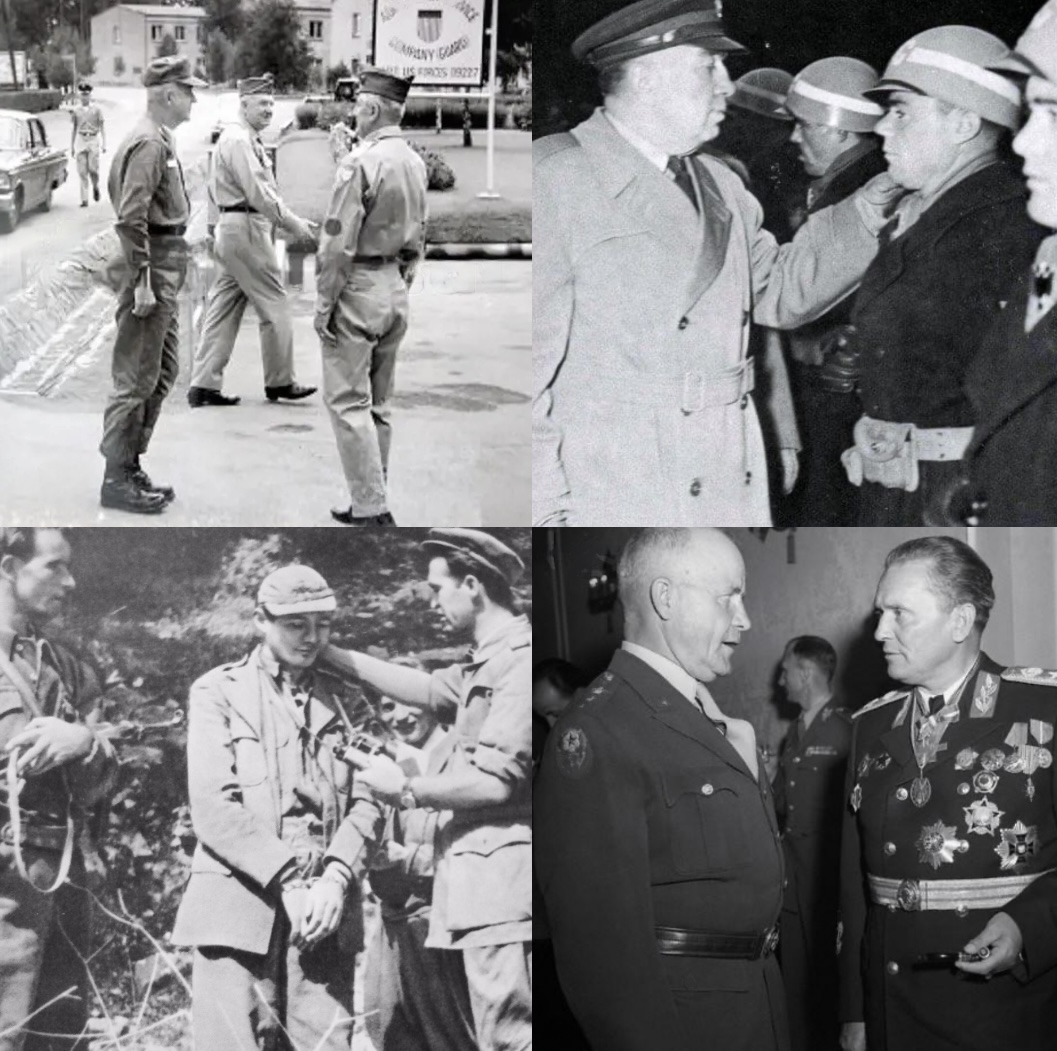
- Top left: American forces recruiting paramilitary soldiers in Munich, Germany; Top right: US Colonel F. H. Dunn inspecting the anti-communist Company 4000 during training in Hohenbrunn, Bavaria in November 1950; Bottom left: The Sigurimi with a captured CIA agent Bottom right: Josip Broz Tito with US General John C. H. Lee, charged to take down fellow communist ruler Enver Hoxha
| Date | 1949–1956; Operation Valuable: 1949–1954 (5 years); Operation BG/Fiend: October 1950–May 1956 (5 years and 7 months) |
| Location | Albania |
| Result | Operational failure |

Belligerents
| Albania | Western Bloc: United States; United Kingdom; France; Albanian exiles NATO: Italy; West Germany (Note: Formation of the unit Company 4000); Greece; Turkey; Separatists: (Northern Epirus) KEVA Yugoslavia |

Commanders and leaders
| (People's Socialist Republic of Albania) Enver Hoxha (People's Socialist Republic of Albania) Mehmet Shehu | (United States) Dean Acheson (United States) Frank Wisner (United States) Franklin Lindsay (United States) James G. McCargar (United Kingdom) David Smiley (United Kingdom) Julian Amery (Socialist Federal Republic of Yugoslavia) Josip Broz Tito |

Units involved
| Albanian People's Army: Sigurimi | United States Army; CIA; Kompania 4000; OPC; British Army; (United Kingdom) MI6; French Army; (France) SDECE; Italian Navy (Socialist Federal Republic of Yugoslavia) UDBA |

Strength
| (People's Socialist Republic of Albania) Unknown | Initial operation: (United States) / (United Kingdom) / (France) 500 agents (United States) / (United Kingdom) / (France) 2,000 paramilitary soldiers (United States) 5 submarines (United States) 180 C-47 aircraft (United States) 80 landing craft assault boats (United States) 6 landing craft utility (Northern Epirus) 7,500 commandos (Socialist Federal Republic of Yugoslavia) Unknown |

Casualties and losses
| Unknown | 1949–1954 (United States) / (United Kingdom) / (France) 300 agents dead (NATO) 961 agents and paramilitaries killed or captured 60 agents killed (Note: The agents were mainly Yugoslavian, Greek, Italian, British and American) |
- 400 civilians executed

Operation Valuable was a failed covert operation conducted during the Cold War by France, the United Kingdom and the United States in collaboration with other Western Bloc nations. The operation aimed to overthrow the communist regime of Albanian ruler Enver Hoxha as part of broader efforts to counter communist influence around the world and install pro-Western leaders. It involved strategic military actions, incorporating air, naval, and ground assets in pursuit of its objectives.

As part of the operation, the French General Directorate for External Security (DGSE), the British Secret Intelligence Service (SIS or MI6) and the American Central Intelligence Agency (CIA) launched a joint covert operation using Albanian expatriates as agents. Other anti-communist Albanians and Europeans from other nations worked as agents for Greek and Italian intelligence services, some supported by MI6 and the CIA.

Many of the agents were caught, put on trial, and either shot or condemned to long prison terms of penal labor.

== Background ==
Albania was in an unenviable position after World War II, as Greece claimed Albanian-controlled Northern Epirus. The Western Allies recognized neither King Zog I nor a republican government-in-exile, nor did they ever raise the question of Albania or its borders at major wartime conferences. No reliable statistics on Albania's wartime losses exist, but the United Nations Relief and Rehabilitation Administration reported about 30,000 Albanian dead from the war, 200 destroyed villages, 18,000 destroyed houses, and about 100,000 people made homeless. Albanian official statistics claim higher losses.

British plans for the overthrow of Hoxha and the communist regime in Albania had existed since 1946. The Russia Committee, established in 1946 by the British Foreign Office, was created to oppose the extension of Soviet control by promoting civil strife in Russia's western border nations.

== Operational plans ==
Some time in early September 1949, talks between Foreign Secretary of the United Kingdom Ernest Bevin and US Secretary of State Dean Acheson commenced about launching a "counter-revolution" in Albania. The US and UK, along with allies Italy and Greece, agreed to support the overthrow of the Hoxha regime in Albania and to eliminate Soviet influence in the Mediterranean region. Bevin wanted to place King Zog on the throne as the leader of Albania once Hoxha was overthrown. The plan called for parachute drops of royalists into the Mati region in Central Albania. The region was known as a bastion of Albanian traditionalism and moreover praised for their loyalty to King Zog, himself an offspring of one of the regional clans. The original plan was to parachute in agents, in order to organize a massive popular revolt, which the allies would supply by air drops. In time, this revolt would spill out a civil war. The trouble that this would cause Soviet politics was considered by the British to be worth the risk, and if it did succeed, then it could be the starting point of a chain reaction of counter-revolutions throughout the Eastern Bloc. The chief of MI6, Stewart Menzies, was not enthusiastic about the paramilitary operation but saw it as a way to appease the former SOE "stinks and bangs people."

The British sought United States funding for the operation and for them to provide bases. Senior British intelligence officer William Hayter, who chaired the Joint Intelligence Committee (JIC), came to Washington, D.C. in March with a group of Secret Intelligence Service members and Foreign Office staff that included Gladwyn Jebb, Earl Jellicoe, and MI6 Chief Peter Dwyer and a Balkans expert. Joined by MI6 Washington liaison Kim Philby, they met with Robert Joyce of the US State Department's Policy and Planning Staff (PPS) and Frank Wisner, who was the head of the Office of Policy Coordination (OPC), and other US intelligence officials such as James McCargar and Franklin Lindsay. McCargar was assigned to liaise with Philby on joint operational matters. Unbeknownst to the MI6 and CIA, Philby was a communist and a spy for Soviet foreign intelligence, and has subsequently been blamed for the failure of the operation.

Anti-communist Albanians were recruited from refugee camps in Greece, Italy, and Turkey. The manpower for what MI6 codenamed VALUABLE Project and the CIA FIEND consisted of 40% from the Balli Kombëtar (BK), an Albanian nationalist and anti-communist organization formed during World War II, 40% from Albania's monarchist movement, known as Legaliteti and the rest from other Albanian factions.

== Valuable Project/Fiend ==
A dozen Albanian émigrés were recruited and taken to Libya to train for a pilot project that would become known as Operation Valuable. The MI6, with US Army Colonel "Ace" Miller as a liaison, trained these men in the use of weapons, codes and radio, the techniques of subversion and sabotage. They were dropped into the mountains of Mati throughout 1947, but failed to inspire the inhabitants of the region into a larger revolt. The operation continued into 1949. There were sabotage attempts on the Kuçova oil fields and the copper mines in Rubik but no real success in raising a revolt. Then, the US government weighing up the political situation, decided to lend a hand. In September 1949, Bevin went to Washington, D.C. to discuss Operation Valuable with US government officials. The CIA released a report that concluded that "a purely internal Albanian uprising at this time is not indicated, and, if undertaken, would have little chance of success." The CIA asserted that the Enver Hoxha regime had a 65,000 man regular army and a security force of 15,000. There were intelligence reports that there were 1,500 Soviet "advisers" and 4,000 "technicians" in Albania helping to train the Albanian Army.

British and US naval officials were concerned that the USSR was building a submarine base at the Karaburun Peninsula near the port of Vlora. On 6 September 1949, when NATO met for the first time in Washington, Bevin proposed that "a counter-revolution" be launched in Albania. US Secretary of State Dean Acheson was in agreement. NATO, established as a defensive military alliance for Western Europe and North America, was now committed to launching offensive covert operations against a sovereign nation in the Balkans. The US and UK, joining with their allies, Italy and Greece, agreed to support the overthrow of the Hoxha regime in Albania and to eliminate Soviet influence in the Mediterranean region. Bevin wanted to place King Zog on the throne as the leader of Albania once Hoxha was overthrown.

In August 1949, an announcement was made in Paris that Albanian political exiles had formed a multiparty committee to foment anti-communist rebellion in the homeland; in actuality the "Free Albania" National Committee was created by American diplomatic and intelligence officials for political cover to a covert paramilitary project, with British concurrence. The British made the first organizational move, hiring on as chief trainer Major David Smiley, deputy commander of a cavalry (tank) regiment stationed in Germany. The leaders of the Balli Kombetar, an exile political group whose key policy was to replace the Albanian communist regime with a non-royalist government, had already agreed with Neil "Billy" McLean and his cohort, Julian Amery, to supply 30 Albanian émigrés, some veterans of World War II guerrilla and civil wars, as recruits for the operation to penetrate Albania.

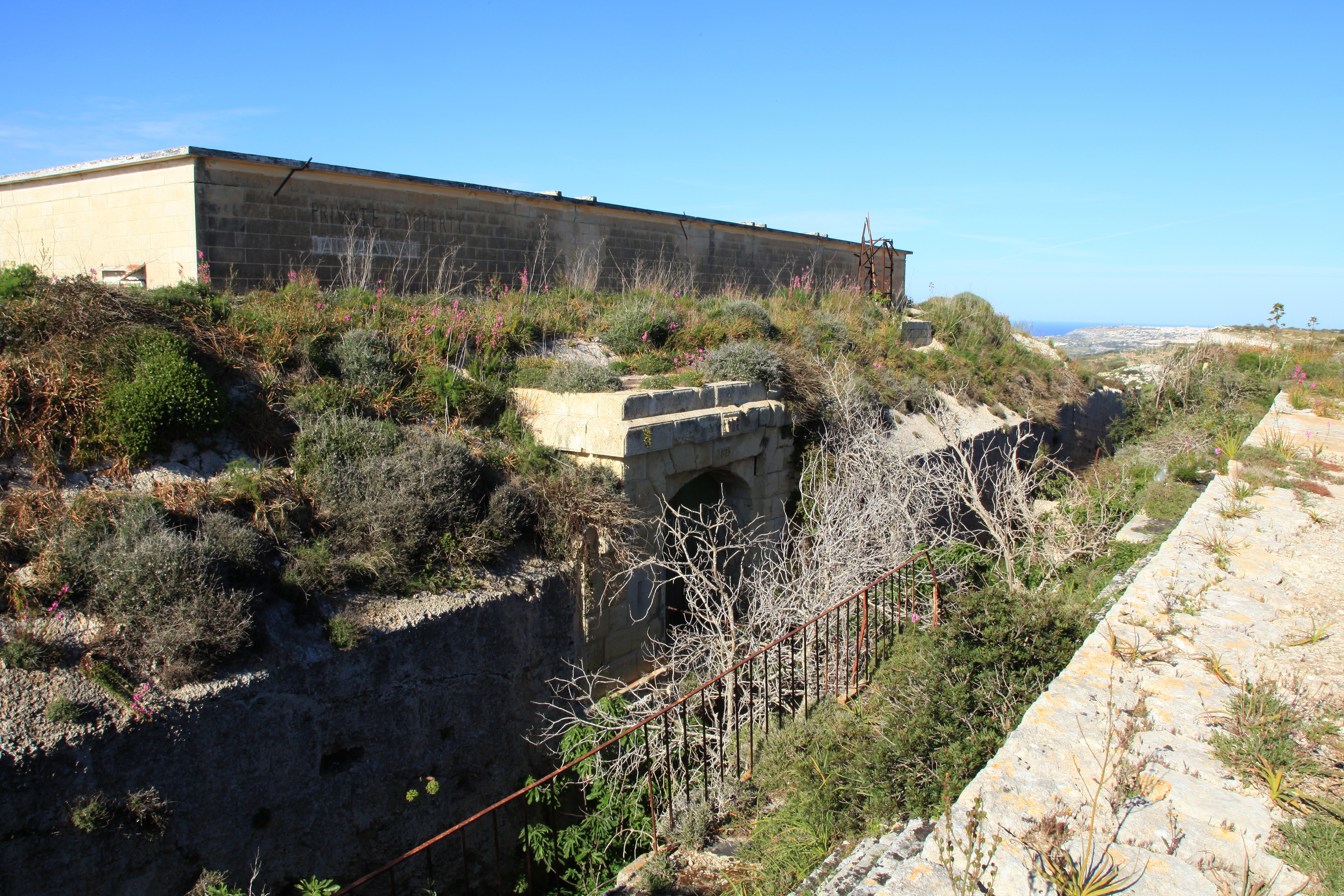
Fort Binġemma, where Albanian recruits were trained.

In July 1949, the first group of recruits, were transported by British special operations personnel to Fort Binġemma, on the British crown colony of Malta. Labeled as "The Pixies" by the SIS, they spent two months training as radio operators, intelligence gatherers, and more sophisticated guerrillas than they had been as members of cetas (guerrilla bands) during World War II. On 26 September 1949, nine Pixies boarded a Royal Navy trawler which sailed north; three days later, a Greek style fishing boat, known as a caïque and named Stormie Seas, sailed from Malta.

With a stop at an Italian port, the two vessels sailed 3 October, rendezvoused at a point in the Adriatic Sea, and transferred the Albanians to the caïque. Hours later that same night, the Pixies landed on the Albanian coast, some distance south of Vlora, which was the former territory of the Balli Kombetar, others further north. Albanian government security forces soon interdicted one of the two groups on commandos. The Communists killed four members, while the survivors from the covert landing exfiltrated south to Greece.

For two years after this landing, small groups of British-trained Albanians left every so often from training camps in Malta, Britain, and West Germany. Most of the operations failed, with Albanian security forces interdicting many of the insurgents. Occasionally, the Albanian authorities would report on "large but unsuccessful infiltrations of enemies of the people" in several regions of the country. Some American agents, originally trained by Italian or Greek officials, also infiltrated by air, sea, or on foot to gather intelligence rather than take part in political or paramilitary operations. The most successful of these operatives was Hamit Matjani, code name Tiger, who participated in 15 land incursions.

The last infiltration took place a few weeks before Easter 1952. Captain Zenel Shehu, Captain Branica and radio operator Tahir Prenci were guided by veteran gendarme and guerrilla fighter Matjani and three armed guards to the Mati region northeast of Tirana. Albanian security forces militia were waiting for them at their rendezvous point, a house owned by Shehu's cousin, a known supporter of Zog. The militia forced Shehu's operator to transmit an all clear signal to his base in Cyprus. The operator had been schooled to deal with such situations, using a fail-safe drill which involved broadcasting in a way that warned it was being sent under duress and therefore should be disregarded. However, the all clear signal went out and, nearly a year later, four more top agents, including Matjani himself, parachuted into an ambush at Shen Gjergj (Saint George), near the town of Elbasan. Those not killed were tried in April 1954.

== 1950 Albanian coastline ambushes ==
The 1950 Albanian coastline ambushes involved clashes between the Albanian secret police (Sigurimi) and multiple teams of MI6 agents.

In preparation for the landing of the agents, several C-47 aircraft and boats were used, the planes were piloted by CIA and ex-Polish Air Force colonels. Dwyer was in charge of the MI6 agents involved in the raids. It was one of the most disastrous parts of the covert operation as all of the MI6 agents were killed or captured by Albanian forces.

== Aftermath ==
Operation Valuable was a failure, with 300 MI6 and CIA agents killed during its duration.

== See also ==
- Banda Mustafaj
- Bay of Pigs invasion – similar operation in Cuba
- Italian invasion of Albania

== Sources ==
- Prados, John (2006). Safe for democracy : the secret wars of the CIA. Chicago: Ivan R. Dee. ISBN 978-1-61578-011-2. OCLC 812925034.
- Nicholas Bethell (1985). Betrayed. New York: Times Books. ISBN 0-8129-1188-1. OCLC 2215298.
- Colonel David Smiley LVO, OBE, MC, "Irregular Regular", Michael Russell, Norwich, 1994 (ISBN 0-85955-202-0). The Mémoirs of a Royal Horse Guards officer, SOE agent in Albania and Thailand, and later MI6 agent in Poland, Malta, Oman and Yemen. He trained the Pixies in Malta in 1949. Translated in French by Thierry Le Breton, Au cœur de l'action clandestine. Des Commandos au MI6, L'Esprit du Livre Editions, France, 2008 (ISBN 978-2-915960-27-3). With numerous photographs.
- Dorril, Stephen. MI6: Fifty Years of Special Operations, Fourth Estate, University of Michigan: 2000 (ISBN 978-1-857020-93-9)
- Bruce Page; David Leitch; Phillip Knightley (1968). The Philby Conspiracy. New York: Doubleday. OCLC 165938.
- Paul Hockenos (2003). Homeland calling: exile patriotism and the Balkan wars. Ithaca, N.Y: Cornell University Press. ISBN 0-8014-4158-7. OCLC 52165767.
- Noble, Andrew. "Bullets and Broadcasting: Methods of Subversion and Subterfuge in the CIA War against the Iron Curtain." MA dissert. University of Nevada, 2009
- Stavrou, Nikolaos A. "Searching for a Brother Lost in Albania's Gulag". Mediterranean Quarterly 19, no. 2 (2008): 47-81

=== Media ===
- Irish television program "Who Do You Think You Are? Episode: Rosanna Davison" Broadcast on RTÉ One, 28 September 2009. Contains the revelation that Rosanna Davison's grandfather Charles Davison took up a secret posting in Malta in 1952, training agents to infiltrate Albania.
