= Enver Hoxha =

Leader of Albania from 1944 to 1985

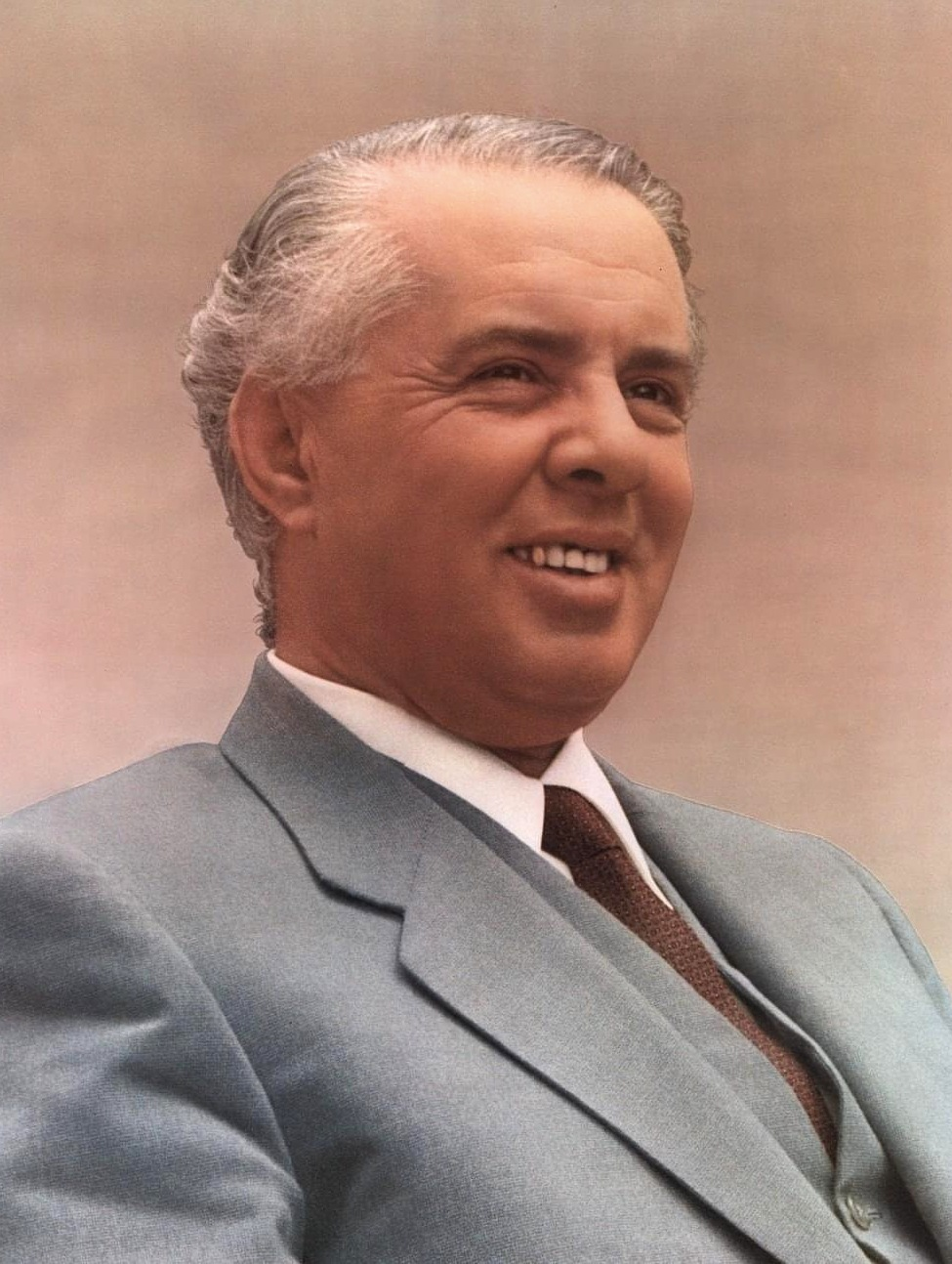
- Official portrait, 1968

First Secretary of the Party of Labour of Albania
- In office 8 November 1941 – 11 April 1985
- Preceded by: Position established
- Succeeded by: Ramiz Alia

22nd Prime Minister of Albania
- In office 20 October 1944 – 19 July 1954
- President: Omer Nishani; Haxhi Lleshi
- Deputy: Myslim Peza; Koçi Xoxe; Mehmet Shehu
- Preceded by: Ibrahim Biçakçiu
- Succeeded by: Mehmet Shehu

Minister of Foreign Affairs
- In office 22 March 1946 – 23 July 1953
- Prime Minister: Himself
- Preceded by: Omer Nishani
- Succeeded by: Behar Shtylla

Minister of People's Defence
- In office 20 October 1944 – 31 July 1953
- Prime Minister: Himself
- Succeeded by: Beqir Balluku

Personal details
- Born: Enver Halil Hoxha; 16 October 1908 Gjirokastër, Ottoman Empire
- Died: 11 April 1985 (aged 76) Tirana, PSR Albania
- Resting place: People's Cemetery, Tirana, Albania; 41.307361°N 19.761892°E
- Party: Party of Labour of Albania (1941–1985)
- Other political affiliations: Korça's Communist Group (1936–1941)
- Spouse: Nexhmije Xhuglini (m. 1945)
- Relations: Hysen Hoxha (uncle)
- Children: 3, including Ilir
- Education: University of Montpellier; Free University of Brussels
- Awards: Hero of the People; Order of Lenin; Order of Skanderbeg; Order of the People's Hero; Order of Suvorov; Hero of Socialist Labour; Order of the Partisan Star; Order of the Flag
- Nickname: "Iron Fist of Albania"

Military service
- Allegiance: LANÇ (1941–1945); People's Republic of Albania (1944–1985)
- Branch/service: LANÇ (1941–1945); Albanian People's Army (1944–1985)
- Years of service: 1941–1944
- Rank: Army General
- Commands: LANÇ; Albanian People's Army (supreme commander)
- Battles/wars: World War II; World War II in Albania; Liberation of Tirana; Kosovo Operation (1944); Operation Valuable
- De facto leader of Albania: ← (First in role); Ramiz Alia →

Enver Halil Hoxha (Note: UK: /ˈhɒdʒə/ HOJ-ə, US: /ˈhɔːdʒɑː/ HAW-jah; Albanian: [ɛnˈvɛɾ ˈhɔdʒa]) (16 October 1908 – 11 April 1985) was an Albanian politician, revolutionary, and communist political theorist who was the leader of Albania from 1944 until his death in 1985. He served as the First Secretary of the Party of Labour of Albania from 1941 until his death, while concurrently holding membership in its Politburo, chairman of the Democratic Front of Albania, and commander-in-chief of the Albanian People's Army. Additionally, he was the twenty-second Prime Minister of Albania from 1944 to 1954, periodically assuming the titles of foreign minister and defence minister.

Hoxha was born in Gjirokastër (then part of the Ottoman Empire) in 1908. After the Italian invasion of Albania, he helped unify the fractured Albanian communist movement into the Communist Party of Albania. He was elected First Secretary in March 1943 at the age of 34. Less than two years after the liberation of the country, the monarchy of King Zog I was formally abolished, and Hoxha became the country's de facto head of state.

In 1966, he spearheaded the Cultural and Ideological Revolution, a campaign that, among other things, wished to eliminate the influence of religion on Albanian society. During his time as First Secretary, Albania saw many breakthroughs in standard of living, industry, and social development; however, over the same period he implemented a program of state atheism and ordered the anti-religious persecution of Muslims and Christians. His government outlawed traveling abroad and private proprietorship. The government imprisoned, executed, or exiled thousands of landowners, rural clan leaders, peasants who resisted collectivization, and allegedly disloyal party officials. Hoxha was succeeded by Ramiz Alia, who was in charge during the fall of communism in Albania. Alia was later imprisoned twice in 1992 and 1996, and Hoxha's political legacy was denounced. Many Hoxha-era buildings, including the infamous bunkers built to shield Albania from a potential invasion, have since been repurposed.

Hoxha's government was characterised by a strict adherence to an anti-revisionist form of Marxism–Leninism, particularly from the mid-to-late 1960s onwards. Following the Sino-Albanian Split between 1976 and 1978, the Party of Labour of Albania formally severed ties with the Chinese Communist Party, and Hoxha declared that the nation would pursue the construction of communism independently. This ideological stance led to numerous parties around the world to declare themselves Hoxhaist. The International Conference of Marxist–Leninist Parties and Organisations (Unity & Struggle) is the best known association of these parties.

== Early life ==
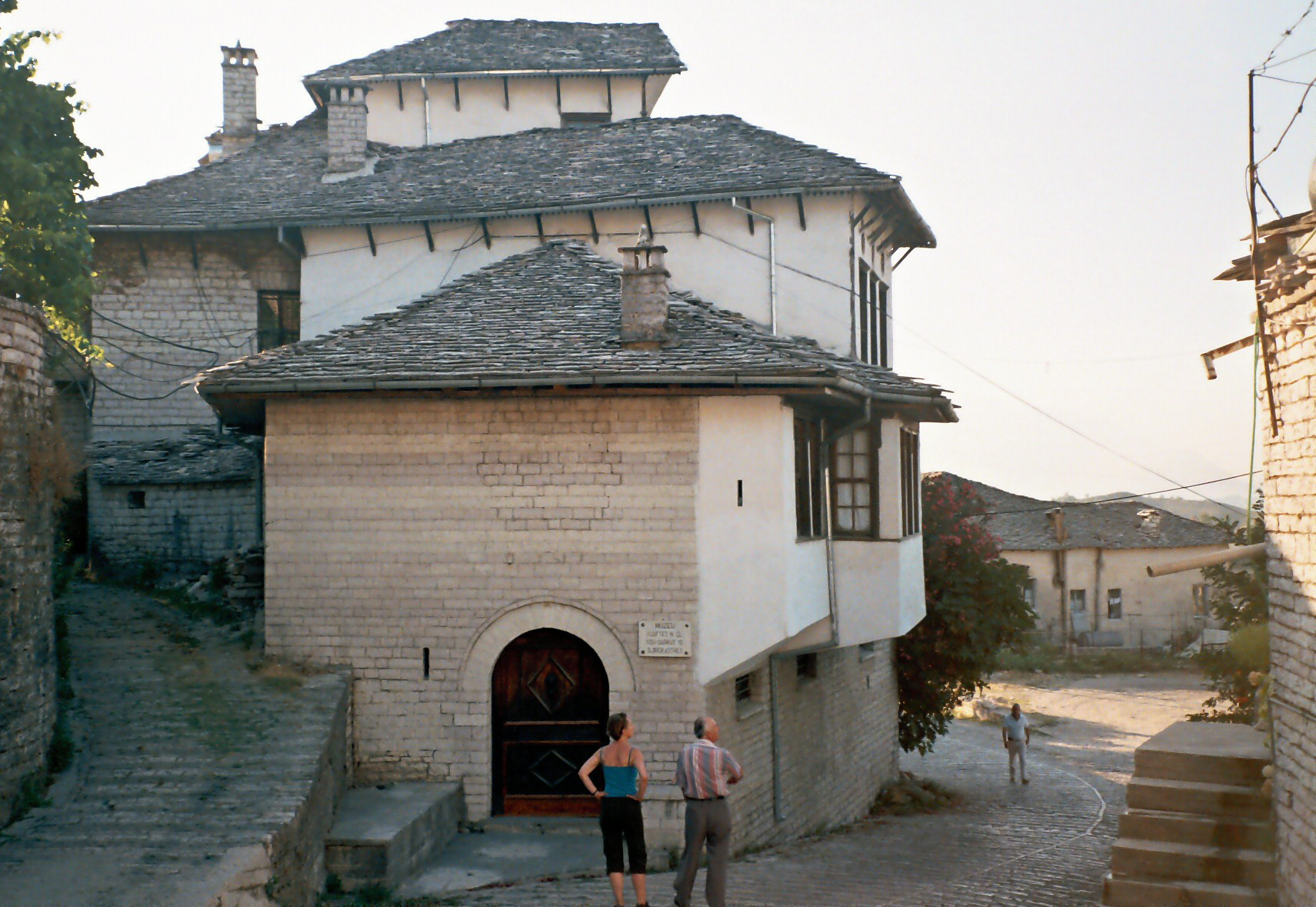
The site of the house where Hoxha grew up in Gjirokastër; the original home was lost to a fire in the 1960s

Hoxha was born in Gjirokastër in southern Albania (then a part of the Ottoman Empire) in October 1908. He was the son of Halil Hoxha, a Shia Muslim cloth merchant who travelled widely across Europe and the United States, and Gjylihan Hoxha (née Çuçi). Enver was named after Enver Pasha, a leading figure of the Young Turk Revolution. The Hoxha family belonged to the Bektashi Sufi order.

After elementary school, Enver followed his studies in the city senior high school "Liria". He started his studies at the Gjirokastër Lyceum in 1923. After the lyceum was closed, due to intervention of Ekrem Libohova, Enver Hoxha was awarded a state scholarship for the continuation of his studies in Korçë, at the French language Albanian National Lyceum until 1930.

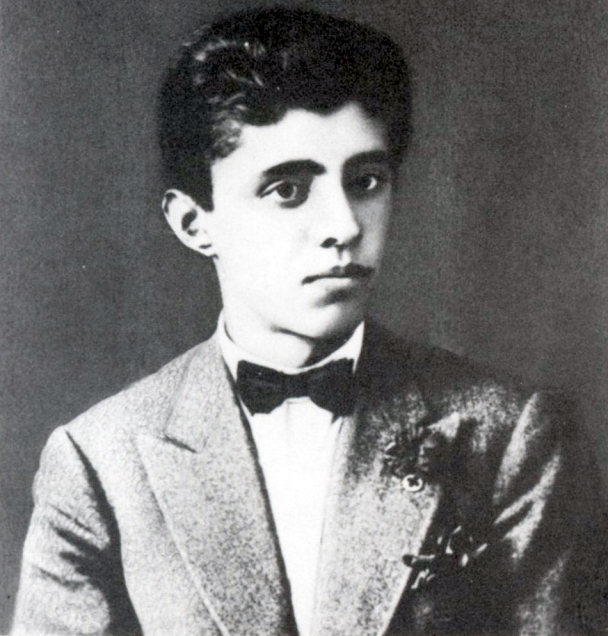
Hoxha in 1927, aged 18

In 1930, Hoxha went to study at the University of Montpellier in Montpellier, France on a state scholarship for botany in the faculty of natural science, but he dropped out due to his interests being in the social and humanistic studies. He later went to Paris, where he presented himself to anti-Zogist immigrants as the brother-in-law of Bahri Omari. From 1935 to 1936, he was employed as a secretary at the Albanian consulate in Brussels. After returning to Albania, he worked as a contract teacher in the Gymnasium of Tirana. Hoxha taught French and morals in the Korça Liceum from 1937 to 1939 and was also the caretaker of the school library.

On 7 April 1939, the Albanian Kingdom was invaded by fascist Italy. The Italians established a puppet government, called the Kingdom of Albania, under Shefqet Vërlaci. At the end of 1939, Hoxha was transferred to the Gjirokastra Gymnasium, but he soon returned to Tirana. He was dismissed from his teacher position for his refusal to join the Albanian Fascist Party. He was helped by his best friend, Esat Dishnica, who introduced Hoxha to Dishnica's cousin Ibrahim Biçakçiu. Hoxha began to sleep in Biçakçiu's tobacco factory "Flora", and after a while, Dishnica opened a shop with the same name, where Hoxha began working. The tobacco store became the headquarters of the local communist cell. He was a sympathizer of Korça's Communist Group.

== World War II ==
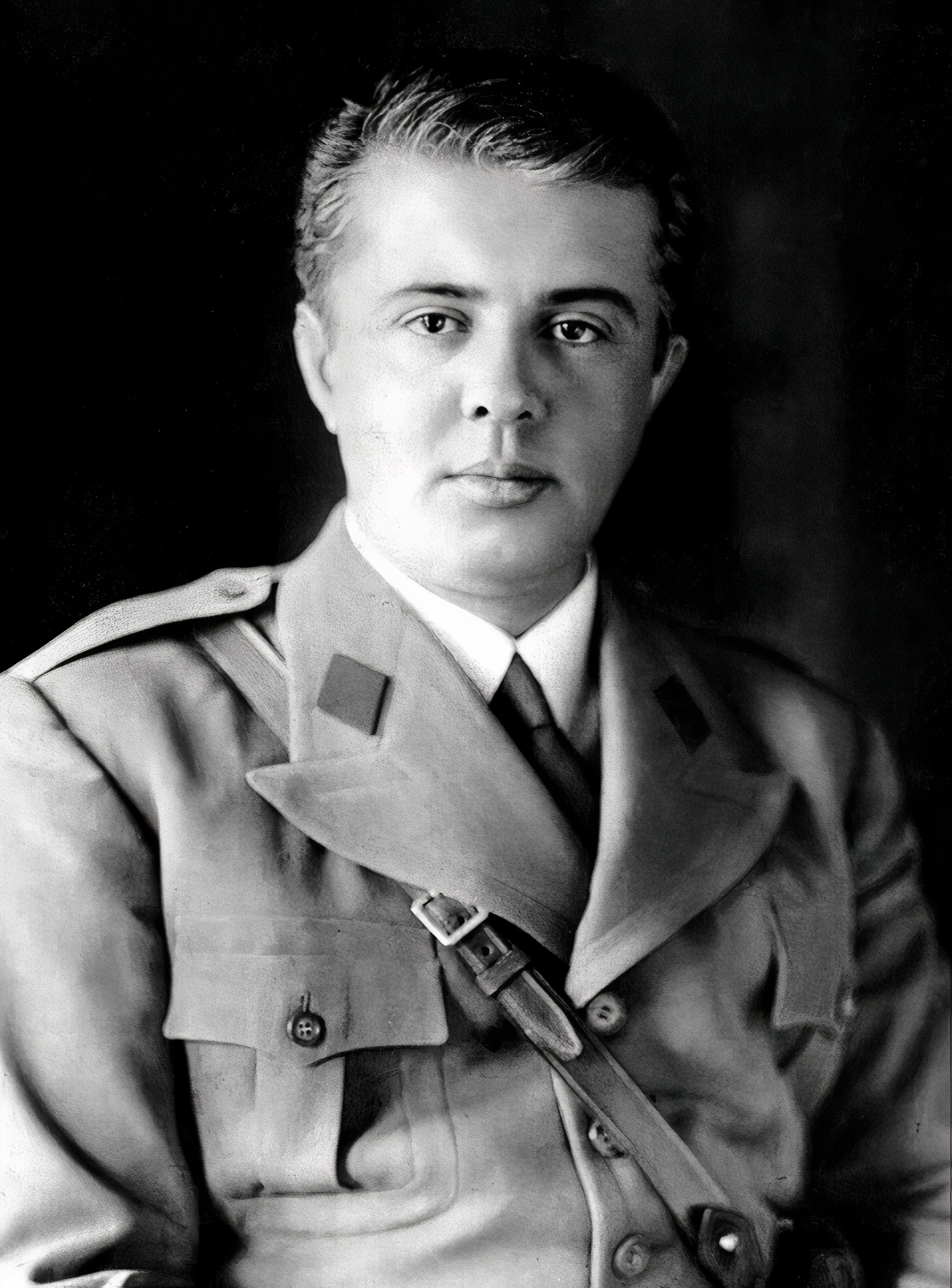
Hoxha in uniform, 1940

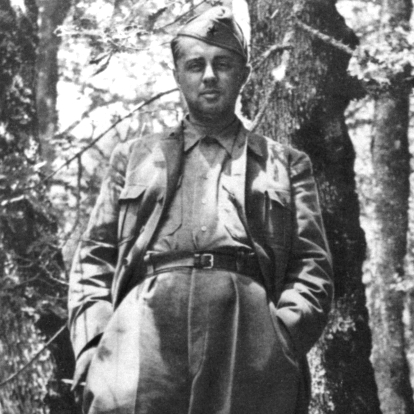
Hoxha as a partisan, 1944

On 8 November 1941, the Communist Party of Albania (later renamed the Party of Labour of Albania [PLA] in 1948) was founded. Hoxha was chosen from the "Korça group" as a Muslim representative by the two Yugoslav envoys as one of the seven members of the provisional Central Committee. The First Consultative Meeting of Activists of the Communist Party of Albania was held in Tirana from 8 to 11 April 1942, with Hoxha himself delivering the main report on 8 April 1942.

In July 1942, Hoxha wrote "Call to the Albanian Peasantry", issued in the name of the Communist Party of Albania. The call sought to enlist support in Albania for the war against the fascists. The peasants were encouraged to hoard their grain and refuse to pay taxes or livestock levies brought by the government. After the September 1942 Conference at Pezë, the National Liberation Movement was founded with the purpose of uniting the anti-fascist Albanians, regardless of ideology or class.

By March 1943, the first National Conference of the Communist Party elected Hoxha formally as First Secretary. During WWII, the Soviet Union's role in Albania was negligible. On 10 July 1943, the Albanian partisans were organised in regular units of companies, battalions and brigades and named the Albanian National Liberation Army. The organization received military support from the British intelligence service, SOE.

Within Albania, repeated attempts were made during the war to remedy the communications difficulties which faced partisan groups. In August 1943, a secret meeting, the Mukje Conference, was held between the anti-communist Balli Kombëtar (National Front) and the Communist Party of Albania. To encourage the Balli Kombëtar to sign, the Greater Albania sections that included Kosovo (part of Yugoslavia) and Chamëria were made part of the Agreement.

=== Disagreement with the Yugoslav Communists ===
A problem developed when the Yugoslav Communists disagreed with the goal of establishing a Greater Albania and asked the Communists in Albania to withdraw their agreement. According to Hoxha, Josip Broz Tito did not believe that Kosovo belonged to Albania and Serbian opposition to the transfer made it an unwise option. After the Albanian Communists repudiated the Greater Albania agreement, the Balli Kombëtar condemned the Communists, who in turn accused the Balli Kombëtar of siding with the Italians. After judging the Communists as an immediate threat, the Balli Kombëtar sided with Nazi Germany, fatally damaging its image among those fighting the fascists. The Communists quickly added many of those who were disillusioned with the Balli Kombëtar to their ranks and they also took centre stage in the fight for liberation.

The Përmet National Congress which was in session during that time called for a "new democratic Albania for the people". Although the monarchy was not formally abolished, King Zog I of the Albanians was barred from returning to the country, which further increased the Communists' control. The Anti-Fascist Committee for National Liberation was founded, chaired by Hoxha. On 22 October 1944, the Committee became the Democratic Government of Albania after a meeting in Berat, and Hoxha was chosen to serve as the interim Prime Minister of Albania. Tribunals were established for the purpose of trying alleged war criminals who were also accused of being "enemies of the people" and they were presided over by Koçi Xoxe.

After Albania's liberation on 29 November 1944, several Albanian partisan divisions crossed the border into German-occupied Yugoslavia, where they fought alongside Tito's partisans and the Soviet Red Army in a joint campaign which succeeded in driving out the last pockets of German resistance. During a Yugoslavian conference in later years, Marshal Tito thanked Hoxha for the Albanian partisans' assistance during the War for National Liberation (Lufta Nacionalçlirimtare). The Democratic Front, dominated by the Albanian Communist Party, succeeded the National Liberation Front in August 1945, and the first post-war election was held on 2 December of that year. The Front was the only legal political organisation which was allowed to stand in the elections, and the government reported that 93% of Albanians voted for it.

On 11 January 1946, Zog was officially deposed, and the People's Republic of Albania was established (it was renamed the People's Socialist Republic of Albania in 1976), although in fact, the country had already been a Communist state since its liberation. As First Secretary of the party, Hoxha was de facto head of state and as a result, he was the most powerful man in the country.

Albanians celebrate their independence day on 28 November (which is the date on which they declared their independence from the Ottoman Empire in 1912), while in the former People's Socialist Republic of Albania, the national day was 29 November, the day the country was liberated from Nazi Germany. Currently, both days are national holidays.

== Early period in power (1944–1965) ==
The sacrifices of our people were very great. Out of a population of one million, 28,000 were killed, 12,600 wounded, 10,000 were made political prisoners in Italy and Germany, and 35,000 made to do forced labour; of the 2,500 towns and villages of Albania, 850 were ruined or razed to the ground; all the communications, all the ports, mines and electric power installations were destroyed, our agriculture and livestock were plundered, and our entire national economy was wrecked.

— Enver Hoxha

Hoxha declared himself a Marxist–Leninist and expressed strong admiration for the Soviet General-Secretary Joseph Stalin. Between 1945 and 1950, the Albanian government adopted policies and actions intended to consolidate power, which included extrajudicial killings and executions that targeted anti-communists. The Agrarian Reform Law passed in August 1945 confiscated land without compensation from beys and large landowners, giving it to peasants. Large landowners possessed 52% of all land before the law passed; this declined to 16% after the law's passage. An educational policy began in September 1949, requiring citizens aged 20 to 40 to attend literacy classes. Literacy rates were 5-10% in rural areas in 1939, and an estimated 15% in the total population in 1946. They had increased to 70% by 1950 (eventually, they would become universal by the 1980s).

=== Difficulties and progress ===
By 1949, the US and British intelligence organisations were working with the former King Zog and the mountain men of his personal guard. They recruited Albanian refugees and émigrés from Egypt, Italy and Greece, trained them in Cyprus, Malta and the Federal Republic of Germany (West Germany), and infiltrated them into Albania. Guerrilla units entered Albania in 1950 and 1952, but they were killed or captured by Albanian security forces. Kim Philby, a Soviet double-agent working as a liaison-officer between MI6 and the CIA, had leaked details of the infiltration plan to Moscow, and the security breach claimed the lives of about 300 infiltrators.

On 19 February 1951, a bombing occurred at the Soviet embassy in Tirana; 23 accused intellectuals were arrested and imprisoned. One of them, Jonuz Kaceli, was killed by Mehmet Shehu during interrogation. Subsequently, the 22 others were executed without trial under Hoxha's orders.

The State University of Tirana, established in 1957, was the first of its kind in Albania. The medieval Gjakmarrja (blood-feud) was banned. Malaria, the most widespread disease, was successfully fought through advances in health care, through the use of DDT, and through the draining of swampland. From 1965 to 1985, no cases of malaria were reported, whereas previously Albania had the greatest number of infected patients in Europe. No cases of syphilis had been recorded for 30 years. In 1938, the number of physicians was 1.1 per 10,000, and there was only one hospital-bed per 1,000 people. In 1950, while the number of physicians had not increased, there were four times as many hospital-beds per head, and health expenditure had risen to 5% of the budget, up from 1% before the war.

=== Relations with Yugoslavia ===
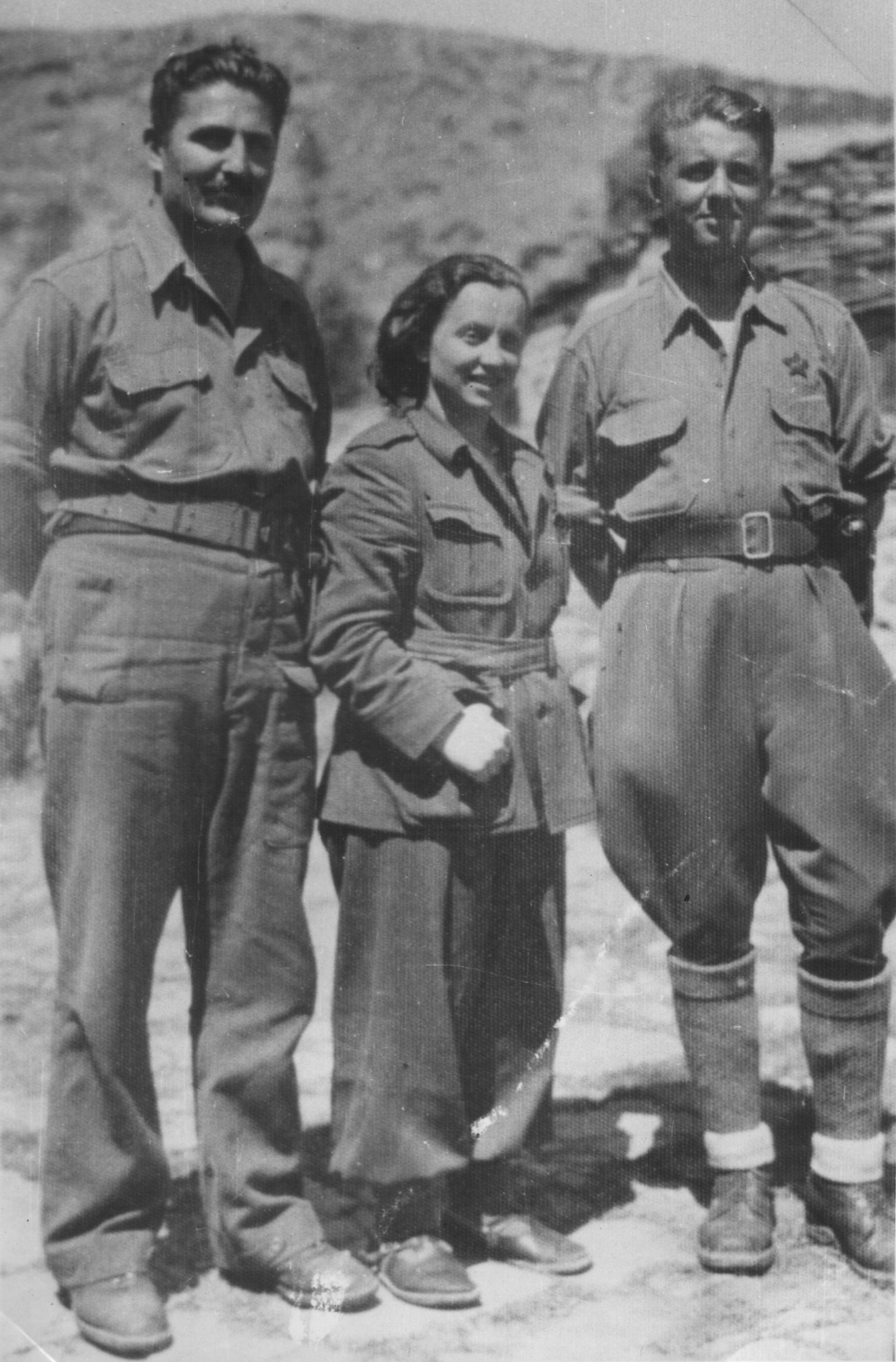
Miladin Popović, Liri Gega, and Enver Hoxha

Relations with Yugoslavia began to change, foreshadowed on 20 October 1944 at the Second Plenary Session of the Communist Party of Albania. The Session considered the problems that the post-independence Albanian government would face. However, the Yugoslav delegation (led by Velimir Stoinić) accused the Party of "sectarianism and opportunism" and blamed Hoxha for these errors. Stoinić stressed the view that the Yugoslav Communist partisans had spearheaded the Albanian partisan movement.

Anti-Yugoslav members of the Albanian Communist Party had begun to think that this was a plot by Tito, who intended to destabilize the Party. Koçi Xoxe, Sejfulla Malëshova and others who supported Yugoslavia fell under suspicion. Tito regarded Albania as too weak to stand on its own; he held that it would do better as a part of Yugoslavia. Hoxha alleged that Tito had aimed to incorporate Albania into Yugoslavia, firstly through the Treaty of Friendship, Co-operation and Mutual Aid in 1946. In time, Albania began to feel that the treaty was heavily slanted towards Yugoslav interests, much like the agreements between Rome and Zog that had made Albania dependent upon Italy.

The Albanian lek became revalued in terms of the Yugoslav dinar in 1946 as a customs union was formed and Albania's economic plan was decided more by Yugoslavia. Albanian economists H. Banja and V. Toçi stated that the relationship between Albania and Yugoslavia during this period was exploitative and that it constituted attempts by Yugoslavia to make the Albanian economy an "appendage" to the Yugoslav economy. Hoxha then began to accuse Yugoslavia of misconduct:

We [Albania] were expected to produce for the Yugoslavs all the raw materials which they needed. These raw materials were to be exported to metropolitan Yugoslavia to be processed there in Yugoslav factories. The same applied to the production of cotton and other industrial crops, as well as oil, bitumen, asphalt, chrome, etc. Yugoslavia would supply its 'colony', Albania, with exorbitantly priced consumer goods, including even items such as needles and thread, and would provide us with petrol and oil, as well as glass for the lamps in which we burn the fuel extracted from our subsoil, processed in Yugoslavia and sold to us at high prices ... The aim of the Yugoslavs was, therefore, to prevent our country from developing either its industry or its working class and to make it forever dependent on Yugoslavia.

Stalin advised Hoxha that Yugoslavia was attempting to annex Albania: "We did not know that the Yugoslavs, under the pretext of 'defending' your country against an attack from the Greek fascists, wanted to bring units of their army into the PRA [People's Republic of Albania]. They tried to do this in a very secretive manner. In reality, their aim in this direction was utterly hostile, for they intended to overturn the situation in Albania." By June 1947, the Central Committee of Yugoslavia began publicly condemning Hoxha, accusing him of taking an individualistic and anti-Marxist line. When Albania responded by making agreements with the Soviet Union to purchase a supply of agricultural machinery, Yugoslavia said that Albania could not enter into any agreements with other countries without Yugoslav approval.

Koçi Xoxe tried to stop Hoxha from improving relations with Bulgaria, reasoning that Albania would be more stable with one trading partner rather than with many. Nako Spiru, an anti-Yugoslav member of the Party, condemned Xoxe and vice versa. With no one coming to Spiru's defense, he viewed the situation as hopeless and feared that Yugoslav domination of his nation was imminent; Spiru apparently committed suicide in November 1947.

At the Eighth Plenum of the Central Committee of the Party (26 February to 8 March 1948) Xoxe was implicated in a plot to isolate Hoxha and to consolidate his own power. He accused Hoxha of being responsible for the decline in relations with Yugoslavia and stated that a Soviet military mission should be expelled in favor of a Yugoslav counterpart. Hoxha remained firm; his support had not declined. When Yugoslavia publicly broke with the Soviet Union, Hoxha's support-base grew stronger. Then, on 1 July 1948, Tirana called on all Yugoslav technical advisors to leave the country and unilaterally declared all treaties and agreements between the two countries null and void. Xoxe was expelled from the party, and on 13 June 1949, he was executed by hanging.

In 1948, a border conflict erupted between Albania and Yugoslavia. Enver Hoxha and the Albanian Military Intelligence services, the Sigurimi, played a significant role in promoting separatism in Kosovo and the idea of a "Greater Albania".

=== Relations with the Soviet Union ===
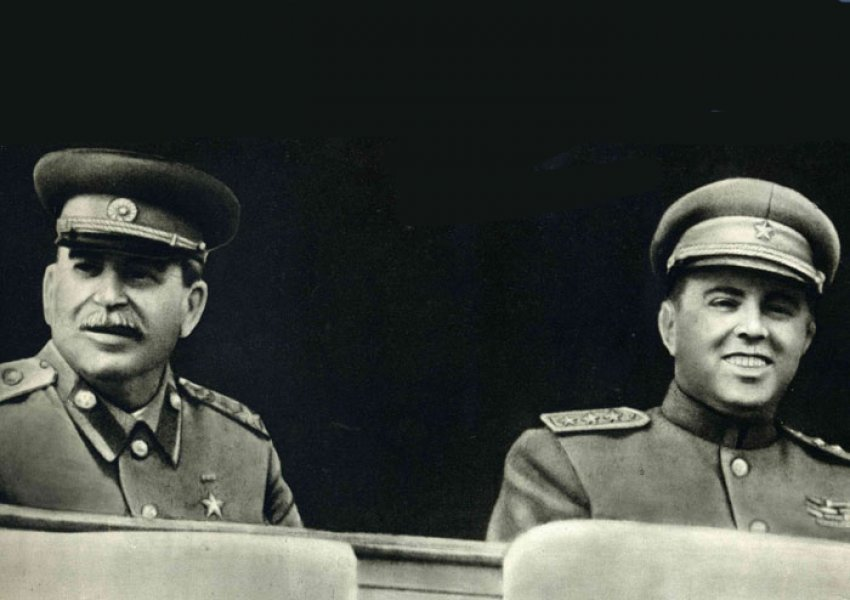
Joseph Stalin and Hoxha in Moscow in the 1950s

After the break with Yugoslavia, Hoxha aligned himself with the Soviet Union. From 1948 to 1960, Albania received $200 million in Soviet aid for technical and infrastructural expansion. Albania joined Comecon on 22 February 1949, and it served as a pro-Soviet force on the Adriatic. A Soviet submarine-base was built on the Albanian island of Sazan near Vlorë, posing a hypothetical threat to the U.S. Sixth Fleet in the Mediterranean. Soviet-Albanian relations remained close until the death of Stalin in March 1953. Albania declared 14 days of national mourning – more than in the Soviet Union. Hoxha assembled the population of Tirana in the capital's largest square, which featured a Stalin statue, requested that they kneel and take a 2,000-word oath of "eternal fidelity" and "gratitude" to their "beloved father" and "great liberator".

Under Nikita Khrushchev, Stalin's eventual successor, aid reduced and Albania was encouraged to adopt Khrushchev's specialisation policy, whereby Albania would develop its agricultural output in order to supply the Soviet Union and other Warsaw Pact countries while they would develop products of their own, which would, in theory, strengthen the Warsaw Pact. However, this also meant that Albanian industrial development, which Hoxha heavily promoted, would be hindered.

In May–June 1955, Soviet leaders visited Yugoslavia and Khrushchev renounced the expulsion of Yugoslavia from the Communist bloc. Khrushchev also began making references to Palmiro Togliatti's polycentrism theory. Hoxha had not been consulted on this and was offended. Yugoslavia began asking for Hoxha to rehabilitate the image of Xoxe; Hoxha steadfastly refused. In 1956 at the Twentieth Party Congress of the Communist Party of the Soviet Union, Khrushchev condemned Stalin's cult of personality and denounced his predecessor's excesses. Khrushchev then announced the theory of peaceful coexistence, which angered Hoxha greatly. The Institute of Marxist–Leninist Studies, led by Hoxha's wife Nexhmije, quoted Vladimir Lenin: "The fundamental principle of the foreign policy of a socialist country and of a Communist party is proletarian internationalism; not peaceful coexistence." Hoxha now took a more active stand against perceived revisionism.

Unity within the Albanian Party of Labour began to decline; a special delegate-meeting held in Tirana in April 1956, composed of 450 delegates, had unexpected results. The delegates "criticized the conditions in the party, the negative attitude toward the masses, the absence of party and socialist democracy, the economic policy of the leadership, etc." while also calling for discussions on the cult of personality and the Twentieth Party Congress.

==== Movement towards China and Maoism ====
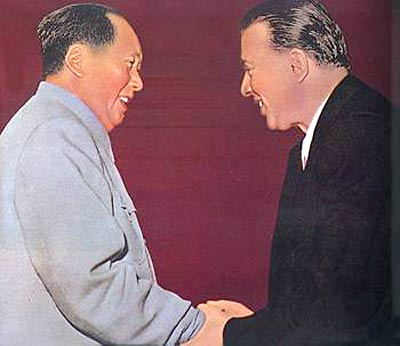
Mao Zedong and Hoxha in 1956

In 1956 Hoxha called for a resolution which would confirm the existing leading cadre of the Party of Labour. The resolution was accepted, and all of the delegates who had spoken against it were expelled from the Party and imprisoned. Hoxha claimed that Yugoslavia had attempted to overthrow the Albanian leaders. This incident increased Hoxha's power, effectively making Khrushchev-style reforms impossible in Albania. In the same year, Hoxha travelled to China (then embroiled in the Sino-Soviet split) and met Mao Zedong. Chinese aid to Albania rose sharply during the next two years.

In an effort to keep Albania in the Soviet sphere, Soviet aid increased, but Albania's relations with the Soviet Union remained at the same level until 1960, when Khrushchev met Sofoklis Venizelos, a liberal Greek politician. Khrushchev sympathised with the concept of an autonomous Greek North Epirus and wanted to use Greek claims on the area to keep the Albanian leaders in line. Hoxha reacted by sending Hysni Kapo, a member of the Albanian Political Bureau, to the Third Congress of the Romanian Workers' Party in Bucharest, an event which Communist heads of state were normally expected to attend. As Soviet-Albanian relations continued to deteriorate during the course of the meeting, Khrushchev said:

Especially shameless was the behavior of that agent of Mao Zedong, Enver Hoxha. He bared his fangs at us even more menacingly than the Chinese themselves. After his speech, Comrade Dolores Ibárruri [a Spanish Communist], an old revolutionary and a devoted worker in the Communist movement, got up indignantly and said, very much to the point, that Hoxha was like a dog who bites the hand that feeds it.

==== Friction with the Soviet Union ====
Relations with the Soviet Union rapidly deteriorated. Hoxha adopted a hardline policy, and the Soviets reduced grain-shipments at a time when Albania faced the possibility of a flood-induced famine. In July 1960, a plot to overthrow the Albanian government, organised by Soviet-trained Rear Admiral Teme Sejko, was discovered. After that two pro-Soviet members of the Party, Liri Belishova and Koço Tashko, were expelled.

In August, the Party's Central Committee protested to the Central Committee of the Communist Party of the Soviet Union about the presence of an anti-Albanian Soviet Ambassador in Tirana. The Fourth Congress of the Albanian Party (13 to 20 February 1961) was the last meeting that the Soviet Union or other Eastern European nations attended. During the congress, Mehmet Shehu said that while many members of the Party were accused of tyranny, this was a baseless charge, and unlike the Soviet Union, Albania was led by genuine Marxists.

The Soviet Union retaliated by threatening Albania with "dire consequences" unless the condemnations were retracted. Days later, Khrushchev and Antonín Novotný, President of Czechoslovakia, threatened to cut off economic aid. In March, Albania was not invited to attend the meeting of the Warsaw Pact nations, and in April, all Soviet technicians were withdrawn from Albania. In May, nearly all Soviet troops at the Soviet submarine-base were withdrawn.

On 7 November 1961, Hoxha made a speech in which he called Khrushchev a "revisionist, an anti-Marxist and a defeatist". Hoxha portrayed Stalin as the last Communist leader of the Soviet Union and alluded to Albania's independence. By 11 November, the USSR and every other Warsaw Pact nation had broken diplomatic relations with Albania. Albania was unofficially excluded from the Warsaw Pact and Comecon. The Soviet Union also attempted to claim control of the submarine base. The Albanian Party then passed a law prohibiting any other nation from owning an Albanian port. The Albanian–Soviet split was now complete.

== Later rule (1965–1985) ==
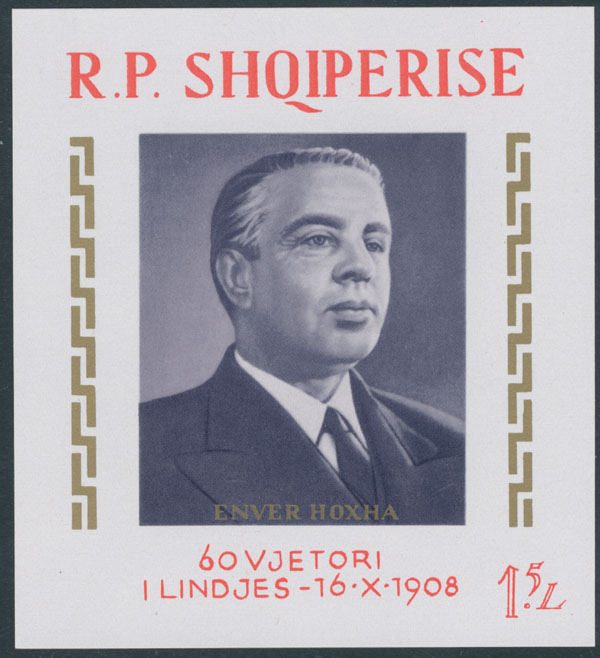
Postage stamp celebrating Hoxha's 60th birthday (1968)

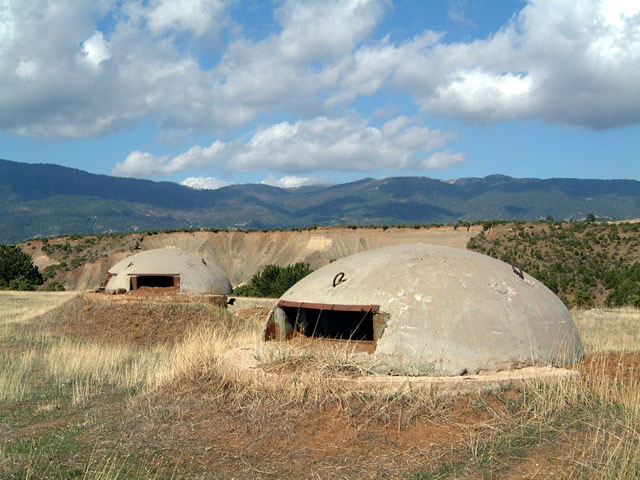
Bunkers in Albania were built during Hoxha's rule to avert the possibility of external invasions. By 1983 over 173,000 concrete bunkers were scattered throughout the country.

As Hoxha's leadership continued, he took on an increasingly theoretical stance. He wrote criticisms which were based on theory and current events which occurred at the time; his most notable criticisms were his condemnations of Maoism after 1978.

During World War II, the Albanian Communists encouraged women to join the partisans and following the war, women were encouraged to take up menial jobs, as the education necessary for higher level work was out of most women's reach. In 1938, 4% worked in various sectors of the economy. In 1970, this number had risen to 38%, and in 1982 to 46%. In 1978, 15.1 times as many females attended eight-year schools as had done so in 1938 and 175.7 times as many females attended secondary schools. By 1978, 101.9 times as many women attended higher schools as in 1957.

During the Cultural and Ideological Revolution, women were encouraged to take up all jobs, including government posts, which resulted in 40.7% of the People's Councils and 30.4% of the People's Assembly being made up of women, including two women in the Central Committee by 1985. Hoxha said of women's rights in 1967:

The entire party and country should hurl into the fire and break the neck of anyone who dared trample underfoot the sacred edict of the party on the defense of women's rights.

An electrification campaign was begun in 1960, and the entire nation was expected to have electricity by 1985. Instead, it achieved this on 25 October 1970. During the Cultural and Ideological Revolution of 1967–1968 the military changed from traditional Communist army tactics and began to adhere to the Maoist strategy known as people's war, which included the abolition of military ranks, which were not fully restored until 1991.

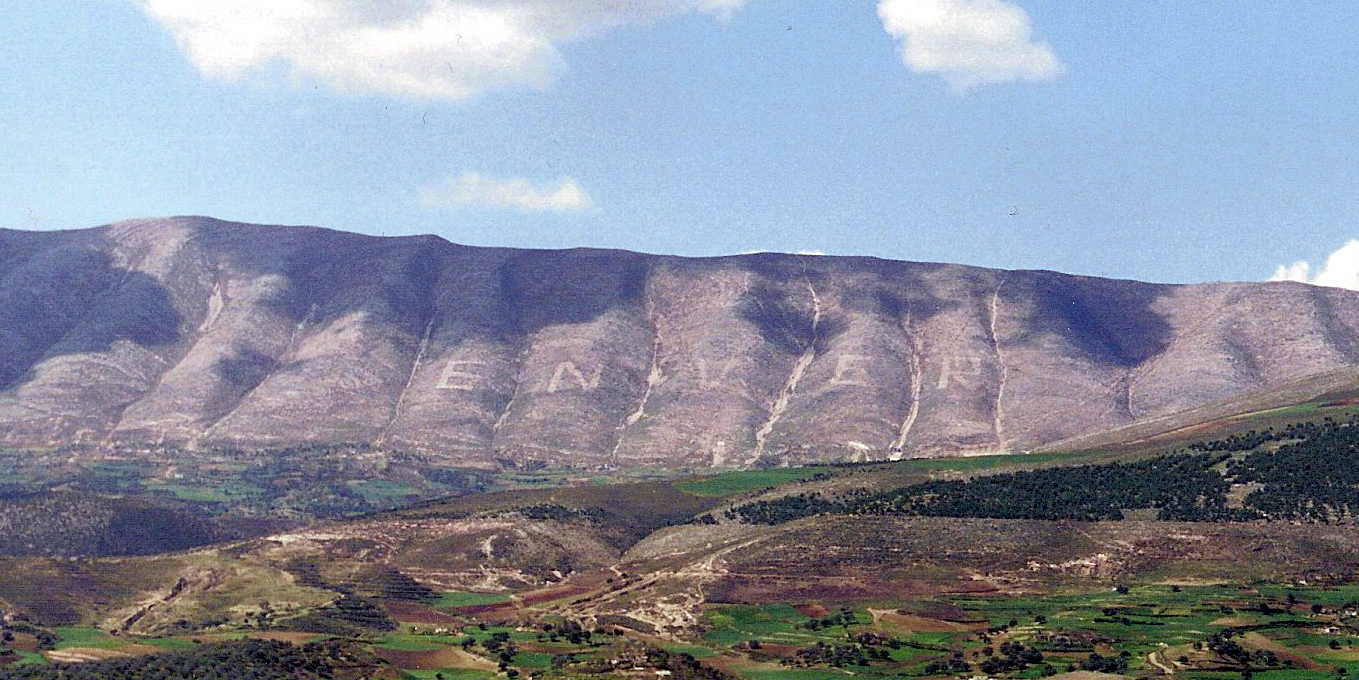
Hoxha's first name engraved on the side of Shpirag Mountain

Hoxha's legacy also included a complex of 173,371 one-man concrete bunkers across a country of 3 million inhabitants, to act as look-outs and gun emplacements along with chemical weapons. The bunkers were built strong and mobile, with the intention that they could be easily placed by a crane or a helicopter in a hole. The types of bunkers vary from machine gun pillboxes and beach bunkers to underground naval facilities and even Air Force Mountain and underground bunkers.

Hoxha's internal policies were true to Stalin's paradigm which he admired, and the personality cult which was developed in the 1970s and organised around him by the Party also bore a striking resemblance to that of Stalin. At times it even reached an intensity which was as extreme as the personality cult of Kim Il Sung (which Hoxha condemned) with Hoxha being portrayed as a genius commenting on virtually all facets of life from culture to economics to military matters. Each schoolbook required one or more quotations from him on the subjects being studied. The Party honored him with titles such as Supreme Comrade, Sole Force and Great Teacher. He adopted a different type military salute for the People's Army to render honors which was known as the "Hoxhaist salute", which involves soldiers curling their right fist and raising it to shoulder level. It replaced the Zogist salute, which was used by the Royal Albanian Army for many years.

Hoxha's governance was also distinguished by his encouragement of a high birthrate policy. For instance, a woman who bore an above-average number of children would be given the government award of Heroine Mother (in Albanian: Nënë Heroinë) along with cash rewards. Abortion was essentially restricted (to encourage high birth rates), except if the birth posed a danger to the mother's life, though it was not completely banned; the process was decided by district medical commissions. As a result, the population of Albania tripled from 1 million in 1944 to around 3 million in 1985.

=== Relations with China ===
A Cultural Revolution poster promoting Albanian-Chinese cooperation featuring Hoxha and Mao; The caption at the bottom reads, "Long live the great union between the Parties of Albania and China!" The two leaders only met twice—first in 1956 during Hoxha's visit to China, and again in 1957 at the Moscow meeting of Communist and Workers' parties—before the formation of the Sino-Albanian alliance.

At the start of Albania's third five-year plan, China offered Albania a loan of $125 million, which would be used to build twenty-five chemical, electrical and metallurgical plants in accordance with the plan. However, the nation discovered that the task of completing these building projects was difficult because Albania's relations with its neighbors were poor and because matters were also complicated by the long distance between Albania and China. Unlike Yugoslavia or the USSR, China had less economic influence on Albania during Hoxha's rule. During the previous fifteen years (1946–1961), at least 50% of Albania's economy was dependent on foreign commerce.

By the time the 1976 constitution was promulgated, Albania had mostly become self-sufficient, but it lacked modern technology. Ideologically, Hoxha found that Mao's initial views were in line with Marxism–Leninism due to his condemnation of Khrushchev's alleged revisionism and his condemnation of Yugoslavia. The financial aid which China provided to Albania was interest-free, and it did not have to be repaid until Albania could afford to do so.

China never intervened in Albania's economic output, and Chinese technicians and Albanian workers both worked for the same wages. Albanian newspapers were reprinted in Chinese newspapers, and they were also read on Chinese radio, and Albania led the movement to give the People's Republic of China a seat on the UN Security Council. During this period, Albania became the second largest producer of chromium in the world, which China considered important. Strategically, the Adriatic Sea was attractive to China because China hoped that it could gain more allies in Eastern Europe through Albania - a hope which was misplaced. Zhou Enlai visited Albania in January 1964. On 9 January, "The 1964 Sino-Albanian Joint Statement" was signed in Tirana. The statement said of relations between socialist countries:

Both [Albania and China] hold that the relations between socialist countries are international relations of a new type. Relations between socialist countries, big or small, economically more developed or less developed, must be based on the principles of complete equality, respect for territorial sovereignty and independence, and non-interference in each other's internal affairs, and must also be based on the principles of mutual assistance in accordance with proletarian internationalism. It is necessary to oppose great-nation chauvinism and national egoism in relations between socialist countries. It is absolutely impermissible to impose the will of one country upon another, or to impair the independence, sovereignty and interests of the people, of a fraternal country on the pretext of 'aid' or 'international division of labour.'

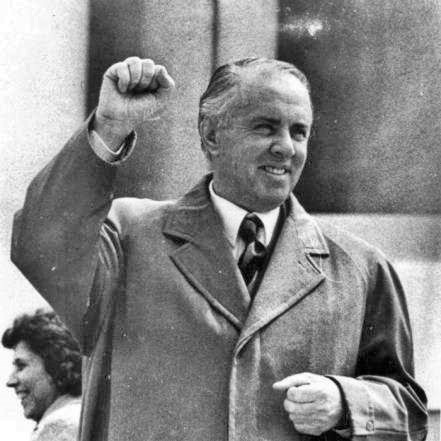
Hoxha in 1971

Like Albania, China defended the "purity" of Marxism by attacking American imperialism and "Soviet and Yugoslav revisionism", both of them were equally attacked as part of a "dual adversary" theory. Yugoslavia was viewed as both a "special detachment of U.S. imperialism" and a "saboteur against world revolution". However, these views began to change in China, which was one of the major issues which Albania had with the alliance. Additionally, unlike Yugoslavia and the Soviet Union, the Sino-Albanian alliance lacked "... an organisational structure for regular consultations and policy coordination, and it was also characterized by an informal relationship which was conducted on an ad hoc basis." Mao made a speech on 3 November 1966 in which he claimed that Albania was the only Marxist–Leninist state in Europe and in the same speech, he also stated that "an attack on Albania will have to reckon with the great People's Republic of China. If the U.S. imperialists, the modern Soviet revisionists or any of their lackeys dare to touch Albania in the slightest, nothing lies ahead for them but a complete, shameful and memorable defeat." Likewise, Hoxha stated that "You may rest assured, comrades, that come what may in the world at large, our two parties and our two peoples will certainly remain together. They will fight together and they will win together."

==== Shift in China's foreign policy after the Cultural Revolution ====
During the Cultural Revolution, China entered into a four-year period of relative diplomatic isolation, however, its relations with Albania were positive. On 20 August 1968, the Soviet invasion of Czechoslovakia was condemned by Albania, along with the Brezhnev doctrine. Albania refused to send troops to Czechoslovakia in support of the invasion, and it officially withdrew from the Warsaw Pact on 5 September.

Albania's relations with China began to deteriorate on 15 July 1971, when United States President Richard Nixon agreed to visit China in order to meet with Zhou Enlai. Hoxha believed that China had betrayed Albania, and on 6 August, the Central Committee of the PLA sent a letter to the Central Committee of the CCP in which it called Nixon a "frenzied anti-Communist". The letter stated:

We trust you will understand the reason for the delay in our reply. This was because your decision came as a surprise to us and it was taken without any preliminary consultation between us on this question, so that we would be able to express and thrash out our opinions. This, we think, could have been useful, because preliminary consultations, between close friends, determined co-fighters against imperialism and revisionism, are useful and necessary, and especially so, when steps which, in our opinion, have a major international effect and repercussions are taken. ... Considering the Communist Party of China as a sister party and our closest co-fighter, we have never hidden our views from it. That is why on this major problem which you put before us, we inform you that we consider your decision to receive Nixon in Beijing as incorrect and undesirable, and we do not approve or support it. It will also be our opinion that Nixon's announced visit to China will not be understood or approved of by the peoples, the revolutionaries and the communists of different countries.

The result of this criticism was a message from the Chinese leadership in 1971 in which it stated that Albania could not depend on an indefinite flow of aid from China, and in 1972 Albania was advised to "curb its expectations about further Chinese contributions to its economic development". By 1972, Hoxha wrote in his diary Reflections on China that China was no longer a socialist country, instead aligning itself with the interests of a powerful nation that prioritized pragmatic relations over socialist principles. In 1973, he wrote that the Chinese leaders had "cut off their contacts" with Albania, reducing their interactions to merely formal diplomatic exchanges. While China maintained its economic agreements, Hoxha remarked that their "initial ardor" had waned.

In response, trade with COMECON (although trade with the Soviet Union was still blocked) and Yugoslavia grew. Trade with Third World nations was $0.5 million in 1973, but $8.3 million in 1974. Trade rose from 0.1% to 1.6%. Following Mao's death on 9 September 1976, Hoxha remained optimistic about Sino-Albanian relations, but in August 1977, Hua Guofeng, the new leader of China, stated that Mao's Three Worlds Theory would become official foreign policy. Hoxha viewed this as a way for China to justify having the U.S. as the "secondary enemy" while viewing the Soviet Union as the main one, thus allowing China to trade with the U.S. He condemned this as a "diabolical plan" for China to position itself as a superpower at the head of the "third world" and the "non-aligned world".

From 30 August to 7 September 1977, Tito visited Beijing and was welcomed by the Chinese leadership. Following this, the PLA declared that China was now a revisionist state akin to the Soviet Union and Yugoslavia and that Albania was the only Marxist–Leninist state on Earth. Hoxha stated:

The Chinese leaders are acting like the leaders of a 'great state'. They think, 'The Albanians fell out with the Soviet Union because they had us, and if they fall with us, too, they will go back to the Soviets,' therefore they say, 'Either with us or the Soviets, it is all the same, the Albanians are done for.' But to hell with them! We shall fight against all this trash, because we are Albanian Marxist–Leninists and on our correct course we shall always triumph!

On 13 July 1978, China announced that it was cutting off all of its aid to Albania. For the first time in modern history, Albania did not have a major ally nor a major trading partner.

=== Political repression and emigration ===
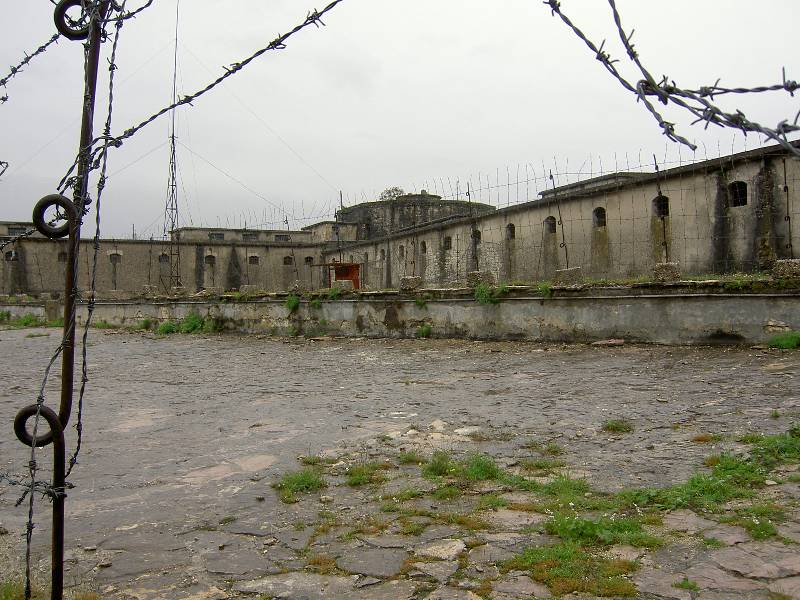
Former political prison in Gjirokastër; during Hoxha's rule, political executions were common, and as a result, about 25,000 people were killed by the regime and many more were persecuted or sent to labour camps

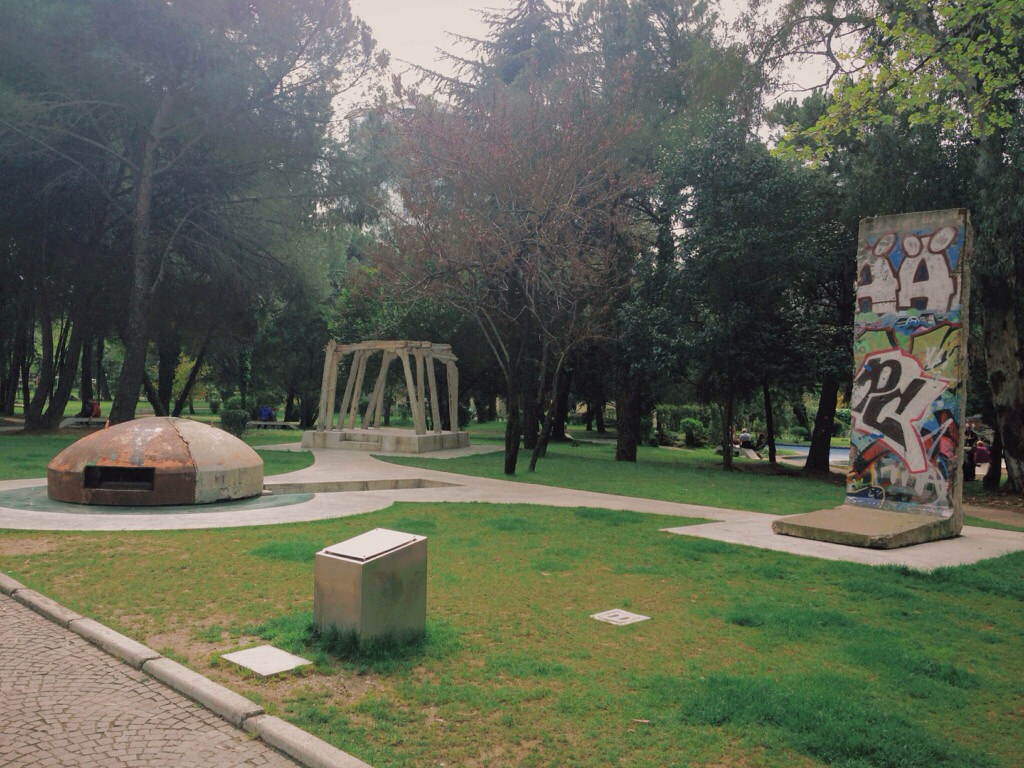
Checkpoint memorial in Tirana featuring a bunker, walls from Spaç Prison, and a section of the Berlin Wall

Certain clauses in the 1976 constitution circumscribed the exercise of political liberties, which the government interpreted as being contrary to the established order. The government denied the population access to information other than that which was disseminated by government-controlled media outlets. Internally, the Sigurimi used the same repressive methods which were used by the NKVD, the MGB, the KGB and the East German Stasi. At one point, every third Albanian had either been interrogated by the Sigurimi or they had been incarcerated in labour camps. The government imprisoned thousands of people in forced-labour camps or it executed them for alleged crimes such as treachery or disrupting the proletarian dictatorship. After 1968, travel abroad was forbidden to all but those people who were on official business. Western European culture was looked upon with deep suspicion, resulting in bans on all unauthorised foreign materials and arrests:

The former student, now the mayor of Tirana, said that he would cower beneath the bedclothes at night and listen to foreign radio stations, an activity which was punishable by a long stretch in a labour camp. He became fascinated by the saxophone. Yet, because such musical instruments were considered an evil influence and were thus banned, he had never seen one.

Art was required to reflect the styles of socialist realism. Beards were banned as unhygienic in order to curb the influence of Islam (many imams and babas had beards) and the Eastern Orthodox faith. The justice system's legal proceedings regularly degenerated into show trials. An American human rights group described the proceedings of one trial, noting that the defendant was not allowed to question the witnesses. While he could express objections to certain aspects of the case, the prosecutor dismissed them, telling him to "sit down and be quiet" because they claimed to know better.

In order to lessen the threat which political dissidents and other exiles posed to the regime, relatives of the accused were often arrested, ostracised, and accused of being "enemies of the people". Political executions were common, and at least 5,000 people—possibly as many as 25,000—were killed by the regime. Torture was often used to obtain confessions:

One émigré, for example, testified to being bound by his hands and legs for one and a half months, and to being beaten with a belt, fists or boots for periods of two to three hours every two or three days. Another was detained in a cell one meter by eight meters large in the local police station and kept in solitary confinement for a five-day period punctuated by two beating sessions until he signed a confession; he was taken to Sigurimi headquarters, where he was again tortured and questioned, despite his prior confession, until his three-day trial. Still another witness was confined underground for more than a year in a three-meter square cell. During this time, he was interrogated at irregular intervals and subjected to various forms of physical and psychological torture. He was chained to a chair, beaten, and subjected to electric shocks. He was shown a bullet that was supposedly meant for him and told that car engines starting within his earshot were driving victims to their executions, the next of which would be his.

During Hoxha's rule, there were six institutions for political prisoners and fourteen labour camps where political prisoners and common criminals worked together. It has been estimated that there were approximately 32,000 people imprisoned in Albania in 1985.

Article 47 of the Albanian Criminal Code stated that to "escape outside the state, as well as refusal to return to the Fatherland by a person who has been sent to serve or has been temporarily permitted to go outside the state" was an act of treason, a crime punishable by a minimum sentence of ten years and a maximum sentence of death. The Albanian government went to great lengths to prevent people from defecting by leaving the country:

An electrically wired metal fence stands 600 meters to one kilometer from the actual border. Anyone touching the fence not only risks electrocution but also sets off alarm bells and lights which alert guards stationed at approximately one-kilometre intervals along the fence. Two meters of soil on either side of the fence are cleared in order to check for footprints of escapees and infiltrators. The area between the fence and the actual border is seeded with booby traps such as coils of wire, noise makers consisting of thin pieces of metal strips on top of two wooden slats with stones in a tin container which rattle if stepped on, and flares that are triggered by contact, thus illuminating would-be escapees during the night.

=== Religion ===
After the demise of the Ottoman Empire, Albania was a predominantly Muslim country, in which social structure was based on confessional communities, rather than ethnic groups. After the rise of nationalism in the Ottoman Empire, Muslims were classified as Turks, Eastern Orthodox Christians were classified as Greeks, and Catholics were classified as Latins. Hoxha believed that this division of Albanian society along religious and ethnic lines was a serious issue because it fueled Greek separatists in southern Albania in particular, and it also divided the nation in general. The Agrarian Reform Law of 1945 confiscated much of the church's property in the country. Catholics were the earliest religious community to be targeted because the Vatican was considered an agent of Fascism and anti-Communism. In 1946 the Jesuit Order was banned and the Franciscans were banned in 1947. Decree No. 743 (On religion) sought the establishment of a national church, and it also forbade religious leaders from associating with foreign powers.

Mother Teresa, a Catholic nun whose relatives resided in Albania during Hoxha's rule, was denied a chance to see them because she was considered a dangerous agent of the Vatican. Despite multiple requests and despite the fact that many countries made requests on her behalf, she was not granted the opportunity to see her mother and sister. Mother Teresa's mother and sister both died during Hoxha's rule, and the nun herself was only able to visit Albania five years after the Communist regime collapsed.

The Party focused on atheist education in schools. This tactic was effective, primarily as a result of the high birthrate policy, which was encouraged after the war. During periods which are considered "holy periods" by religious people, such as Lent and Ramadan, many foods and non-water beverages were distributed in schools and factories, and religious people who refused to eat those foods and drink those beverages when they were offered to them during their "fasting times" were denounced.

Starting on 6 February 1967, the party began to promote secularism in place of Abrahamic religions. Hoxha, who had launched a Cultural and Ideological Revolution after being partially inspired by China's Cultural Revolution, encouraged Communist students and workers to use more forceful tactics in order to discourage people from continuing their religious practices; the use of violence was initially condemned.

According to Hoxha, the surge in anti-theist activities began with the youth. The result of this "spontaneous, unprovoked movement" was the demolition or conversion of all 2,169 churches and mosques in Albania. State atheism became official policy, and Albania was declared the world's first atheist state. Town and city names which echoed Abrahamic religious themes were abandoned for neutral secular ones, as well as personal names. By 1968, Hoxha stated in a speech in that "Religion is a fuel kindling fires of all evils". During this period, religiously based names were also made illegal. The Dictionary of People's Names, published in 1982, contained 3,000 approved, secular names. In 1992, Monsignor Dias, the Papal Nuncio for Albania appointed by Pope John Paul II, said that out of the three hundred Catholic priests who were present in Albania prior to the Communists' rise to power, only thirty were still active. The promotion of religion was banned, and all clerics were labeled reactionaries and outlawed. Those religious figures who refused to embrace the principles of Marxism–Leninism were either arrested or carried on their activities in hiding.

=== Cultivating ultranationalism ===
During the anti-religious campaign, Enver Hoxha declared that "the only religion of Albania is Albanianism", a quotation from the poem O moj Shqypni ("O Albania") by the 19th-century Albanian writer Pashko Vasa.

Muzafer Korkuti, one of the dominant figures in post-war Albanian archaeology and now the Director of the Institute of Archaeology in Tirana, stated the following in an interview on 10 July 2002:

Archaeology is part of the politics which the party in power has and this was understood better than anything else by Enver Hoxha. Folklore and archaeology were respected because they are the indicators of the nation, and a party that shows respect to national identity is listened to by other people; good or bad as this may be. Enver Hoxha did this as did Hitler. In Germany in the 1930s there was an increase in Balkan studies and languages and this too was all part of nationalism.

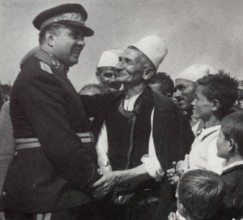
Hoxha meeting with citizens

Efforts were focused on an Illyrian-Albanian continuity issue. An Illyrian origin of the Albanians (without denying Pelasgian roots) continued to play a significant role in Albanian nationalism, resulting in a revival of given names supposedly of "Illyrian" origin, at the expense of given names associated with Christianity. At first, Albanian nationalist writers opted for the Pelasgians as the forefathers of the Albanians, but as this form of nationalism flourished in Albania under Enver Hoxha, the Pelasgians became a secondary element to the Illyrian theory of Albanian origins, which could claim some support in scholarship.

The Illyrian descent theory soon became one of the pillars of Albanian nationalism, especially because it could provide some evidence in support of the belief that there was a continuous Albanian presence in Kosovo and Southern Albania, i.e. areas that were subjected to ethnic conflicts between Albanians, Serbs and Greeks. Under the government of Enver Hoxha, an autochthonous ethnogenesis was promoted and physical anthropologists tried to prove that Albanians were different from all other Indo-European populations, a theory which is currently discredited. They claimed that the Illyrians were the most ancient people in the Balkans and greatly extended the age of the Illyrian language.

=== Rejection of Western mass media culture ===
Hoxha and his government were also hostile to Western popular culture as it was manifested in the mass media, along with the consumerism and the cultural liberalism which were associated with it. In a speech on the Fourth Plenum of the Central Committee of the PLA (PLA-CC) on 26 June 1973, Hoxha declared a definitive break with any such Western bourgeois influence and what he described as its "degenerated bourgeois culture". In a speech in which he also criticized the "spread of certain vulgar, alien tastes in music and art", which ran "contrary to socialist ethics and the positive traditions of our people", including "degenerate importations such as long hair, extravagant dress, screaming jungle music, coarse language, shameless behaviour and so on", Hoxha declared:

It is precisely this culture, coated with a glossy veneer, accompanied by sensational advertisement, handled in the most commercial way and back up and financed by the bourgeoisie, that inundates the cinema and television screens, magazines, newspapers and radio broadcasts, all the mass information and propaganda media. Its objective is to turn the ordinary man into a passive consumer of poisonous bourgeois ideas, and to make this consumption an addiction. Not only have we nothing to learn from this culture, no reason to impart it to our masses and youth, but we must reject it contemptuously and fight it with determination.

== Later life and death ==
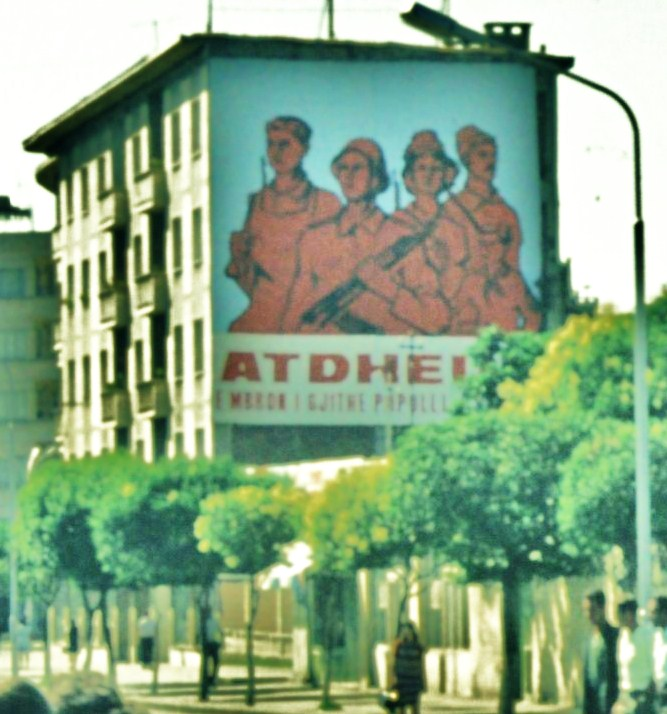
Propaganda mural in Tirana (photographed in 1978). Translation: "The fatherland is defended by all of the people"

In 1974, Hoxha accused Beqir Balluku, the Minister of the People's Defense and a longtime ally, of being an agent of China and attempting a coup d'état, because Balluku had criticised Hoxha's bunker programme and stated that a U.S. and Soviet invasion of Albania was unlikely. Hoxha sentenced Balluku and a group of his accused associates to death and appointed Mehmet Shehu as Minister of Defense.

A new Constitution was decided upon by the Seventh Congress of the Albanian Party of Labour on 1–7 November 1976. According to Hoxha, "The old Constitution was the Constitution of the building of the foundations of socialism, whereas the new Constitution will be the Constitution of the complete construction of a socialist society."

Self-reliance was now stressed more than ever. Citizens were encouraged to train in the use of weapons, and this activity was also taught in schools. The purpose of this training was to encourage the creation of quick partisans.

Borrowing and foreign investment were banned under Article 26 of the Constitution, which read: "The granting of concessions to, and the creation of foreign economic and financial companies and other institutions or ones formed jointly with bourgeois and revisionist capitalist monopolies and states as well as obtaining credits from them are prohibited in the People's Socialist Republic of Albania." Hoxha said of borrowing money and allowing investment from other countries:

No country whatsoever, big or small, can build socialism by taking credits and aid from the bourgeoisie and the revisionists or by integrating its economy into the world system of capitalist economies. Any such linking of the economy of a socialist country with the economy of bourgeois or revisionist countries opens the doors to the actions of the economic laws of capitalism and the degeneration of the socialist order. This is the road of betrayal and the restoration of capitalism, which the revisionist cliques have pursued and are pursuing.

Albania was the most isolated country in Europe. In 1983, Albania imported goods which were worth $280 million but it exported goods which were worth $290 million, producing a trade surplus of $10 million.

In 1981, Hoxha ordered the execution of several party and government officials in a new purge. Prime Minister Mehmet Shehu, the second-most powerful man in Albania and Hoxha's closest comrade-in-arms for 40 years, was reported to have committed suicide in December 1981. He was subsequently condemned as a "traitor" to Albania, and he was also accused of operating in the service of multiple intelligence agencies. It is generally believed that he was either killed or he shot himself during a power struggle, which may have resulted from differing foreign policy matters with Hoxha. Hoxha also wrote a large assortment of books during this period, resulting in over 65 volumes of collected works, condensed into six volumes of selected works.

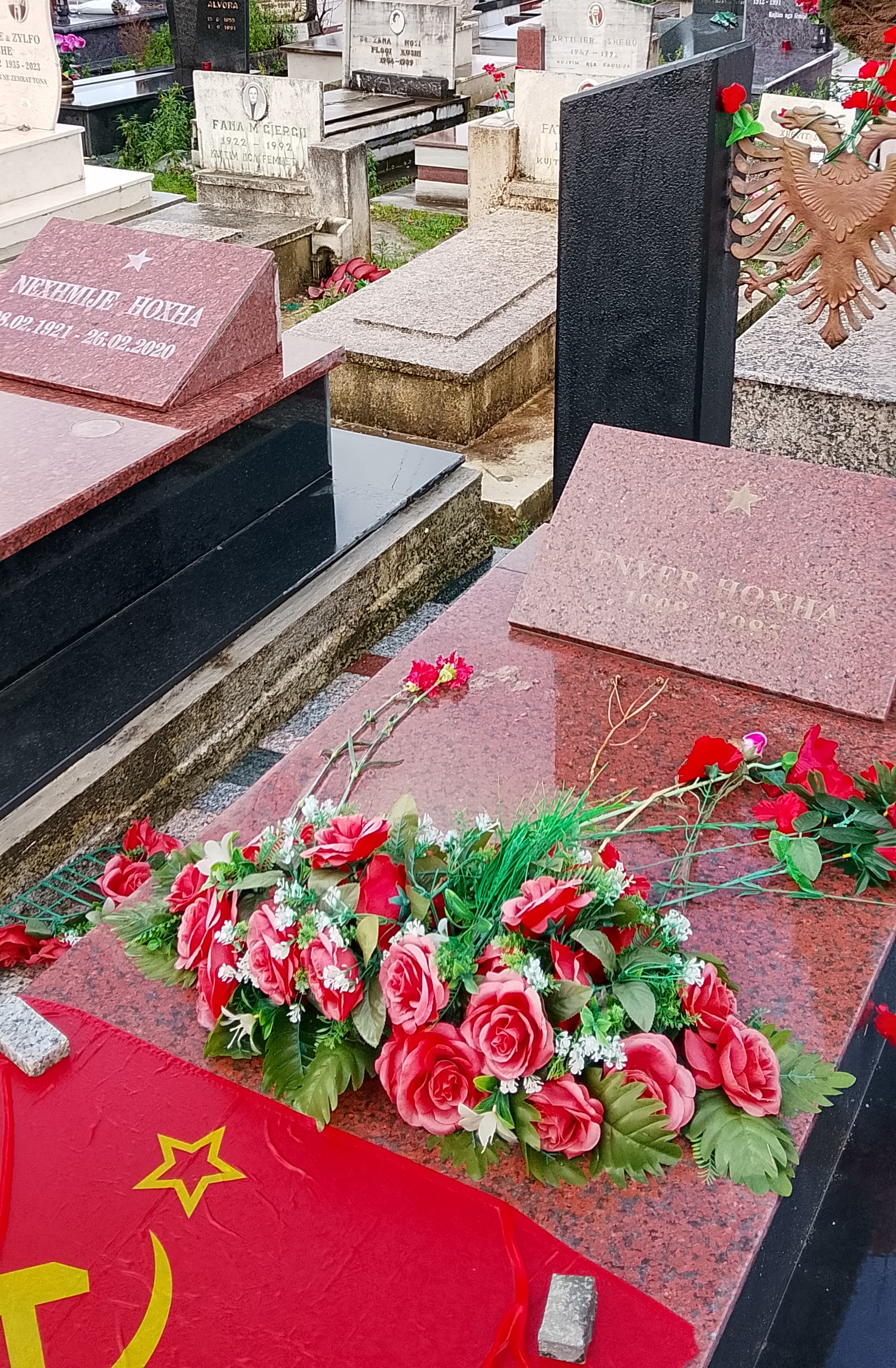
Enver and his wife Nexhmije in the Sharra Cemetery

In 1973, Hoxha suffered a heart attack (a myocardial infarction with arrhythmia) from which he never fully recovered. In increasingly precarious health from the late-1970s onwards, he handed most state functions to Ramiz Alia. In his final days, he used a wheelchair and he suffered from diabetes, which he was diagnosed with in 1948 (his blood vessels started to deteriorate from here), along with cerebral ischemia, which he was diagnosed with in 1984. On 9 April 1985, he was struck by ventricular fibrillation. Over the next 48 hours, he suffered repeated episodes of this arrhythmia, and he died at 02:15am, on 11 April 1985, aged 76. The Albanian government announced seven days of mourning, with flags flown at half-mast, and the cancellation of all forms of entertainment and cultural events.

Fall of Hoxha's statue in Tirana's Skanderbeg Square amid student demonstrations on 20 February 1991

Hoxha's body lay in state at the building of the Presidium of the People's Assembly for three days before he was buried on 15 April after a memorial service on Skanderbeg Square. (Note: There is uncertainty over Hoxha's true date of birth. Fevziu (2016), p. 10 notes: "No fewer than five different dates are to be found in the Central State Archives [of Albania] alone.") The government refused to accept any foreign delegations during Hoxha's funeral and it even condemned the Soviet message of condolences as "unacceptable". After his burial, Hoxha was succeeded as head of state by Ramiz Alia, who gained control of the party's leadership two days later.

Hoxha's death left Albania with a legacy of isolation and fear of the outside world. Despite some economic progress which Albania made during Hoxha's rule, the country was in economic stagnation; Albania was the poorest European country during most of the Cold War.

== Family ==
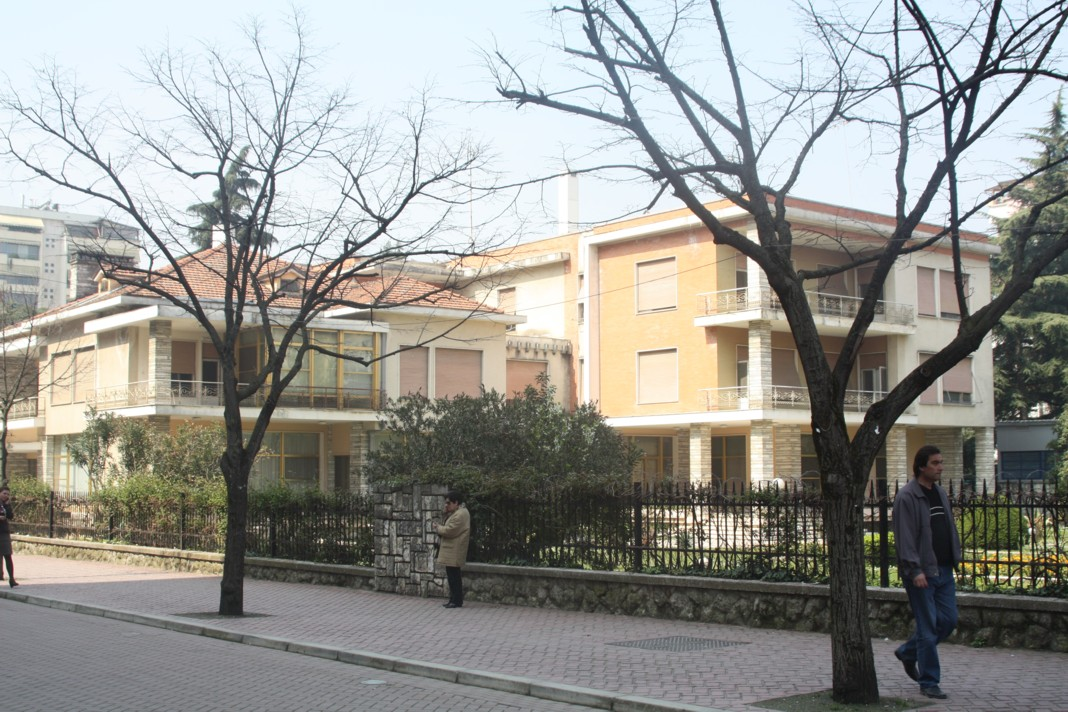
Former residence of Hoxha in the formerly restricted area of Blloku (the Block) in Tirana

The surname Hoxha is the Albanian variant of hodja (from Turkish: hoca), a title which was given to his ancestors due to their efforts to teach Albanians about Islam. Hoxha's parents were Halil and Gjylihan (Gjylo) Hoxha, and Hoxha had three sisters, Fahrije, Haxhire and Sanije. Hysen Hoxha ([hyˈsɛn ˈhɔdʒa]) was Enver Hoxha's uncle and he also was a militant who vigorously campaigned for the independence of Albania, which occurred when Enver was four years old. His grandfather, Beqir, was involved in the Gjirokastër section of the League of Prizren.

Hoxha's son Sokol Hoxha was the CEO of the Albanian Post and Telecommunication service, and he is married to Liliana Hoxha. Sali Berisha, a later democratic president of Albania, was often seen socialising with Sokol Hoxha and other close relatives of leading Communist figures in Albania.

Hoxha's daughter, Pranvera, is an architect. Along with her husband, Klement Kolaneci, she designed the Enver Hoxha Museum in Tirana, a white-tiled pyramid. Some sources have referred to the edifice, said to be the most expensive edifice ever constructed in Albanian history, as the "Enver Hoxha Mausoleum", but this was not an official appellation. The museum was opened in 1988, three years after her father's death, and in 1991, it was transformed into a conference centre and an exhibition venue and it was renamed the Pyramid of Tirana.

== Coup attempts ==
The Mustafa Band was a gang which was connected to counter-revolutionary elements such as the Albanian mafia and members of the royal House of Zogu, and in 1982, it attempted to assassinate Enver Hoxha. The plan failed; two members of it were killed, and another member was arrested.

According to Hoxha, after Albania's long-time prime minister, Mehmet Shehu, died in 1981, documents were found in a vault which previously belonged to him, and according to them, he would poison Hoxha and assume the leadership of the country, orders which were issued by Yugoslav intelligence. In his book The Titoites, Hoxha argued that this plan failed because Shehu was a coward who could not go through with the task and he figured that at the very least, suicide would save his family from the punishment which he deserved for his counter-revolutionary activities.

== Legacy ==
Enver's wife, Nexhmije Hoxha, continued to defend his legacy after the fall of communism, noting the postwar recovery of Albania under his government, while acknowledging some improvements that happened following his rule. Regarding the political repression, she stated in 2008 that “unpleasant and unwelcome things did happen, but that did not come from above, let alone from Enver”. She labeled the corruption charges against her as "political", due to her relationship with Hoxha.

In 2016, the results of a survey which was conducted by the Institute for Development Research and Alternatives (IDRA) showed that 45% of Albanians believed that Hoxha had a positive impact on the history of Albania, whereas 42% of Albanians believed that he had a negative impact on the history of Albania. Younger generations (16–35 years old; born after 1981) tend to have a more negative view of Hoxha's contributions, while older generations (over 35 years old; born before 1981) tend to have a more positive view. Citizens in the regions of southeastern and southwestern Albania who were interviewed had the most positive view of Hoxha, respectively, they comprised 50% and 55% of the entire population. Others have viewed him as a dictator.

On 28 February 2026, the former villa of Enver Hoxha in the Blloku area of Tirana, was torched by anti-communist protesters. The fire was extinguished, and the crowd dispersed.

== Awards ==
Albania

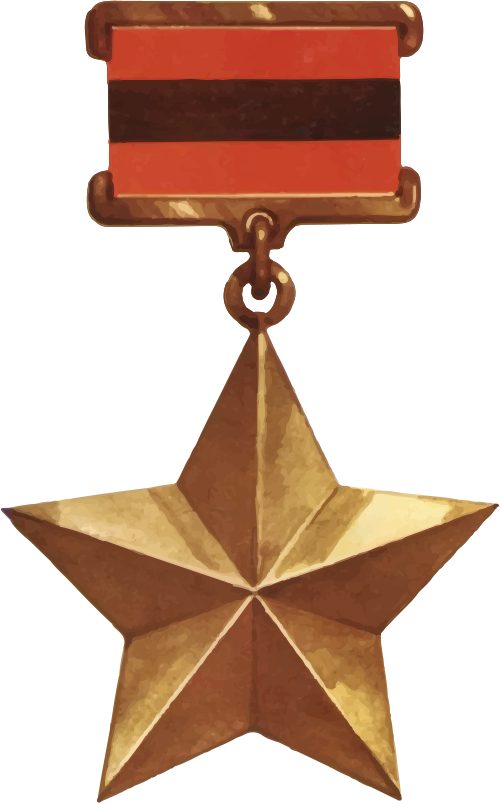
Hero of the People, twice (revoked 1995)
Hero of Socialist Labour
Order of Skanderbeg, 1st Class

Foreign Awards

Order "For Bravery" 1st Class (Bulgaria) (9 September 1944)
Order of the People's Hero (Yugoslavia) (1946)
Order of Suvorov, 1st Class (Soviet Union) (1948)
Order of Lenin (Soviet Union)

== Partial list of works ==
- Selected Works, November 1941 – October 1948 (PDF). Vol. I. Tirana: 8 Nëntori Publishing House. 1974.
- Selected Works, November 1948 – November 1965 (PDF). Vol. II. Tirana: 8 Nëntori Publishing House. 1975.
- Selected Works, June 1960 – October 1965 (PDF). Vol. III. Tirana: 8 Nëntori Publishing House. 1980a.
- Selected Works, February 1966 – July 1975 (PDF). Vol. IV. Tirana: 8 Nëntori Publishing House. 1982a.
- Selected Works, November 1976 – June 1980 (PDF). Vol. V. Tirana: 8 Nëntori Publishing House. 1985a.
- Selected Works, July 1980 – December 1984 (PDF). Vol. VI. Tirana: 8 Nëntori Publishing House. 1987.
- Albania Challenges Khrushchev Revisionism (PDF). New York: Gamma Publishing Co. 1976.
- Imperialism and the Revolution. Tirana: 8 Nëntori Publishing House. 1978.
- Reflections on China (PDF). Vol. I. Tirana: 8 Nëntori Publishing House. 1979a.
- Reflections on China (PDF). Vol. II. Tirana: 8 Nëntori Publishing House. 1979b.
- The Khrushchevites. Tirana: The Institutes of Marxist-Leninist Studies at the CC of the PLA. 1980b.
- With Stalin. Tirana: 8 Nëntori Publishing House. 1981.
- The Titoites (PDF). London: Workers' Publishing House. 1982b.
- The Anglo-American Threat to Albania (PDF). Tirana: 8 Nëntori Publishing House. 1982c.
- Two Friendly Peoples (PDF). Tirana: 8 Nëntori Publishing House. 1985b.
- The Superpowers 1959–1984. Tirana: 8 Nëntori Publishing House. 1986.

== See also ==
- Albanian Resistance of World War II
- Autarky – Characteristic of self-sufficiency
- History of Albania
- Hoxhaism – Variant of Marxism–Leninism
- Human rights in Albania
- National Martyrs' Cemetery of Albania – Memorial cemetery in Tirana, Albania
- Pyramid of Tirana

== Sources ==
- Ash, William (1974). Pickaxe and Rifle: The Story of the Albanian People. London: Howard Baker Press Ltd.
- Banja, Hansa; Toçi, V. (1979). Socialist Albania on the Road to Industrialization. Tirena: 8 Nëntori Publishing House.
- Bessemer, Dirk J., ed. (2006). On Eagle's Wings: The Albanian Economy in Transition. Nova Publishers. ISBN 978-1600210723.
- Begeja, Ksanthipi (1984). The Family in the People's Socialist Republic of Albania. Tirana: 8 Nëntori Publishing House.
- Beloff, Nora (1985). Tito's Flawed Legacy. Boulder, CO: Westview Press. ISBN 978-0-575-03668-0.
- Biberaj, Elez (1986). Albania and China: A Study of an Unequal Alliance. Boulder, CO: Westview Press. ISBN 978-0-813-37230-3.
- Bideleux, Robert; Jeffries, Ian (2007). The Balkans: a post-communist history. Routledge. ISBN 978-0-415-22962-3.
- Bönker, Kirsten (2016). Television Beyond and Across the Iron Curtain. Cambridge Scholars Publishing. ISBN 978-1443816434.
- Cikuli, Zisa (1984). Health Care in the People's Republic of Albania. Tirena: 8 Nëntori Publishing House. ASIN B001ACECPG.
- Eya, Peppa (1997). Oi Alvanoi : neoterē kai synchronē istoria (in Greek). Odysseas. ISBN 978-9602102794. OCLC 880487556.
- Dervishi, Kastriot (2016). The communist movement in the 1924–1944 years and the establishment of ACP's. Tirana: 55. ISBN 978-9928106384. Archived from the original on 12 February 2018.
- Fischer, Bernd J. (1999). Albania at War, 1939–1945. London: Hurst. ISBN 1-85065-531-6. OCLC 42039895.
- Gürpınar, Doğan (2012). "What is in a Name? The Rise of Turkic Personal Male Names in Turkey (1908–38)". Middle Eastern Studies. 48 (5): 692. doi:10.1080/00263206.2012.703617. S2CID 144784853.
- Dervishi, Kastriot (2012). Kryeministrat dhe ministrat e shtetit shqiptar në 100 vjet. Tirana: 55. ISBN 978-9994356225.
- Fevziu, Blendi (2016). Enver Hoxha: The Iron Fist of Albania. London: I.B. Tauris. ISBN 978-1-784-53485-1.
- Galatia, Michael L.; Watkinson, Charles, eds. (2004). Archaeology under dictatorship (in Greek). Kluwer Academic/Plenum Publishers. ISBN 978-0306485084. OCLC 915958520.
- Gjonça, Arjan (2001). Communism, Health, and Lifestyle: The Paradox of Mortality Transition in Albania, 1950–1990. Connecticut: Greenwood Press. ISBN 978-0-313-31586-2.
- Griffith, William E. (1963). "Albania and the Sino-Soviet Rift". Studies in Communism, Revisionism, and Revolution. M.I.T. Press. ISSN 0081-8054.
- Hamm, Harry (1963). Albania – China's Beachhead in Europe. New York: Frederick A. Praeger. ASIN B0000CLUM3.
- The Institute of Marxist-Leninist Studies at the Central Committee of the Party of Labour of Albania (1982). History of the Party of Labor of Albania (2nd ed.). Tirena: 8 Nëntori Publishing House.
- Jessup, John E. (1998). An Encyclopedic Dictionary of Conflict and Conflict Resolution, 1945–1996. Westport, CT: Greenwood Press. ISBN 978-0-313-28112-9.
- Logoreci, Anton (1978). The Albanians: Europe's forgotten survivors. Boulder, CO: Westview Press. ISBN 978-0891588276.
- Madgearu, Alexander; Gordon, Martin (2008). Gordon, Martin (ed.). The wars of the Balkan Peninsula: their medieval origins. Translated by Madgearu, Alexander. The Scarecrow Press.
- Marmullaku, Ramadan (1975). Albania and the Albanians. Translated by Milosavljević, Margot; Milosavljević, Bosko. London: C. Hurst & Co. ISBN 978-0903983136.
- Minnesota Lawyers International Human Rights Committee (1990). Human rights in the People's Socialist Republic of Albania: a report of the Minnesota Lawyers International Human Rights Committee. The Committee. ISBN 978-0929293059. OCLC 24541364.
- Myftaraj, Kastriot (2008). The Secret Life of Enver Hoxha, 1908–1944 (in Albanian). Tirena: Constellation. ISBN 978-99956-706-4-1.
- Myftaraj, Kastriot (2009). The Enigmas of Enver Hoxha's Domination 1944–1961 (in Albanian). Tirena: Constellation. ISBN 978-99956-57-10-9.
- O'Donnell, James S. (1999). A Coming of Age: Albania under Enver Hoxha. East European Monographs. New York: Columbia University Press. ISBN 978-0-88033-415-0.
- Pano, Nicolas C. (1968). The People's Republic of Albania. Baltimore, MD: Johns Hopkins Press. ISBN 978-0608040189.
- Papajorgi, Harilla (1970). Our Friends Ask. The Naim Frashëri Publishing House.
- Pearson, Owen S. (2006). Albania in the Twentieth Century: A History. Vol. III. New York: I.B. Tauris. ISBN 978-1-84511-105-2.
- Pipa, Arshi (1990). Albanian Stalinism. East European Monographs. Boulder, CO: East European Monographs. ISBN 978-0-88033-184-5.
- Pollo, Stephanaq; Puto, Arben (1981). History of Albania: From Its Origins to the Present Day. Routledge. ISBN 978-0710003652.
- Schwandner-Sievers, Stephanie; Fischer, Bernd Jürgen, eds. (2002). Albanian Identities: Myth and History. Indiana University Press. ISBN 978-0253341891. OL 9383049M.
- Reynolds, David (2001). One world divisible : a global history since 1945. W.W. Norton. ISBN 978-0393321081. OCLC 912430370.
- Khrushchev Remembers: The Last Testament. Translated by Talbott, Strobe. Boston, MA: Little, Brown and Co. 1970.
- The Institute of Marxist–Leninist Studies at the Central Committee of the Party of Labour of Albania (1982). History of the Party of Labor of Albania (PDF) (2nd ed.). Tirana: 8 Nëntori Publishing House.
- Vickers, Miranda (1999). The Albanians: A Modern History (Reprint ed.). I.B. Tauris. ISBN 978-1860645419.
- Wheeler, Tony (2010). Lonely Planet Badlands: A Tourist on the Axis of Evil. Victoria: Lonely Planet. ISBN 978-1-74220-104-7.

Political offices
Preceded by New creation	Chairman of the Council of Ministers of Albania; 20 October 1944 – 19 July 1954	Succeeded by Mehmet Shehu
Preceded by Omer Nishani	Minister of Foreign Affairs of Albania; 1946–1953	Succeeded by Behar Shtylla
Party political offices
Preceded by New creation	First Secretary of the Party of Labour of Albania; 8 November 1941 – 11 April 1985	Succeeded by Ramiz Alia
