= Agitation and Propaganda against the State =

Criminal offence in Communist Albania

Constitution 55, or Agitation and Propaganda against the State (Albanian: Agjitacion dhe Propagandë kundër shtetit), was a criminal offence in Communist Albania. This law was used from 1945 until 1991 and was part of the Constitution of the People's Socialist Republic of Albania.

The term was interchangeably used with counterrevolutionary agitation. The latter one was in use after the Albanian Resistance of World War II and was gradually phased out by the end of the 1990s in favor of the former one. According to article 55 of the Albanian Penal Code enacted during Hoxhaism, "propaganda and agitation that called to overturn or undermining of the Albanian power" was punishable with at least 6 months of imprisonment and up to the death sentence in the periods of war or unrest.

== Definition ==
Article 55 was defined:

The creation of any type of organization of a fascist, anti-democratic, religious, and anti-socialist character is prohibited.
Fascist, anti-democratic, religious, war-mongering, and anti-socialist activities and propaganda, as well as the incitement of national and racial hatred are prohibited.

== Usage ==
The article 55 was considered by the critics of the Albanian System as a grave violation of the freedom of speech. It was among the main legal instruments for the prosecution of the Albanian dissidents, some other being the punitive psychiatry and the offense of the social parasitism. While the clauses were phrased using the provision "with the purpose of", official commentaries (referred to as "Additions and Explanations to..."), as well as the actual legal practice made it sufficient to assert that the prosecuted person of sane mind must have realized the malicious implications of their utterances. This article was the most common tool in fighting Albanian dissidents. The first time the law was used was in 1951 at the bombing of Soviet Embassy.

== Trivia ==
Gazeta 55 uses number "55" because Article 55 of the Constitution of communist Albania, dealt with Agitation and Propaganda related crimes.
