= 1951 executions in Albania =

Execution without trial of 22 intellectuals

Massacre of 1951 in Albania
- Location: 41°19′48″N 19°49′45″E; Tirana, Albania
- Date: 26 February 1951
- Target: Intellectuals
- Attack type: Massacre
- Deaths: 22
- Injuries: Mehmet Shehu (lightly injured) during interrogation
- Perpetrators: Communists, notably Enver Hoxha and Mehmet Shehu

The People's Republic of Albania executed 22 intellectuals without trial on 26 February 1951, as ordered by Enver Hoxha. They were accused of bombing the Soviet embassy in Tirana. The victims were 21 men and 1 woman. One day earlier, Jonuz Kaceli was killed while accused of the same crime. It was the first time the Agitation and Propaganda law was used.

== Background ==
=== Arrests ===
The 22 individuals were arrested and put in prison between 20 and 22 February 1951, then executed by firing squad on 26 February. The pretext was the explosion of a small amount of dynamite in the Soviet Embassy in Tirana on 19 February, for which the arrested persons were accused of. On 20 February, the Communist leadership assembled and decided on counter-measures. Present were Enver Hoxha, Tuk Jakova, Mehmet Shehu, Bedri Spahiu, Hysni Kapo, Gogo Nushi, Spiro Koleka, Beqir Balluku, and Liri Belishova.

The arrests were made based on death lists prepared in advance by the Ministry of Interior. The charge, as prepared and signed by Military Prosecutor Siri Çarçani and dated 25 February 1951, was the same for all 22 victims and read:

These people have been put at the service of imperialist foreign espionage, they have become members of a terrorist organization. They have made propaganda about the violent collapse of the people's power and have distributed slogans for a new war from the American and British imperialists and their satellites.

— Siri Çarçani, Military Prosecutor of communist Albania

The same Çarçani admitted later that when he wrote the charge he was completely unaware of any investigation having ever been performed. In addition, the charge was never communicated to any of the victims. Furthermore, a trial was never held.

== Execution ==
One of the arrested intellectuals, Jonuz Kaceli, was killed a day earlier (25 February), by Mehmet Shehu after Kaceli punched and injured Shehu in the face after a long interrogation on high treason accusations by Shehu and Rasim Dedja. Kaceli was thrown out of a window, head-first from the second floor, in the pretense that he had committed suicide.

The 22 victims were executed on 26 February 1951, six days after the first arrest was made. All of the victims were shot based on a government decree issued by the Ministry of the Interior on the same day of the killings. The Minister of Interior that issued the decree was Omer Nishani. Manol Konomi, at the time minister of justice, did not want to sign the death sentences without approval. They were executed at midnight, near the Beshiri bridge, 15 km from Tirana, and were buried in a common grave, bound together.

On 26 February 1951 the other victims were shot by an execution squad. The head of the police during that time, Sali Ormëni, was killed one week after the bombing. On 5 March 1951 the executions were approved by the military court of Communist Albania; that is eight days after the suspects were executed.

== Aftermath and legacy ==
It was later found out that the bombing was actually orchestrated by Hysen Llulla and Qazim Laçi.

In 1991 all victims were declared innocent, and posthumously awarded the order Honor of the State by president Bamir Topi. Their bodies were found bound with barbed wire in a joint mass grave on the Erzen river edge.

== Victims ==
- Ali Qoraliu, politician
- Anton Delhysa, builder
- Gjon Temali, pharmaceut
- Fadil Dizdari, librarian
- Gafur Jegeni, officer
- Haki Kodra, businessman
- Hekuran Troka, businessman
- Jonuz Kaceli, businessman
- Luka Rašković, Yugoslav businessman
- Manush Peshkëpia, poet
- Mehmet Ali Shkupi, thermal engineer
- Myftar Jegeni, officer
- Niko Lezo, chemist
- Pandeli Nova, businessman
- Petro Konomi, telegraphist
- Pjerrin Guraziu, economist
- Qemal Kasaruho, economist
- Reiz Selfo, businessman
- Sabiha Kasimati, biologist
- Tefik Shehu, economist and jurist
- Thoma Katundi, engineer
- Zyhdi Herri, journalist

== See also ==
- List of massacres in Albania
