= Sali Ormeni =

Head of the Albanian police

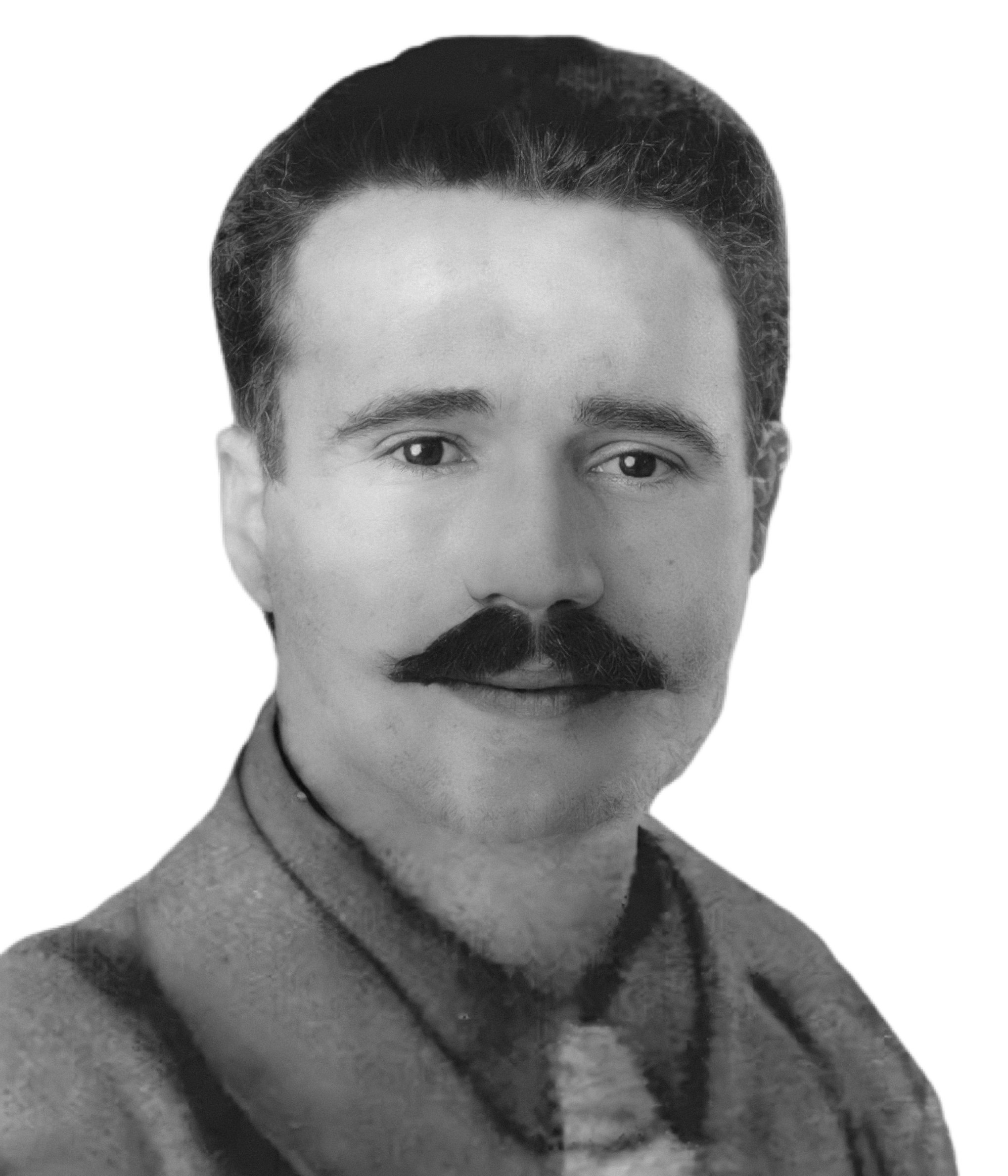
- Sali Ormeni

20th Director of the Albanian State Police
- In office 16 February 1948 – 2 March 1951
- Preceded by: Lako Polena
- Succeeded by: Maqo Çomo

Personal details
- Born: 15 January 1914 Tragjas, Vlorë, Albania
- Died: 2 March 1951 (aged 37) Papër, Elbasan
- Cause of death: Suicide (disputed); Assassinated ?

Sali Ormeni (15 January 1914 – 2 March 1951) was an Albanian army colonel and politician who served as the 20th director of the Albanian State Police. He died on March 2, 1951, one week after the bombing of the Soviet embassy. The government authorities stated at the time that he had committed suicide, but this has later been disputed. His body was found near the village of Papër, Elbasan.

== Career ==
Sali Ormeni was born on January 15, 1914, in the village of Tragjas, Vlorë County. From an early age, he associated himself with the Anti-Fascist Movement for National Liberation and on January 3, 1943, was accepted as a member of the Albanian Communist Party. Distinguished for his bravery during the war, he performed a series of military duties and was eventually promoted to commander of the 3rd Brigade in October 1944. After the war, Ormeni served as commander of the Second Brigade of the People's Division, operative and Chief of Staff of the People's Division (December 1944), commander of the People's Police School (1947) and the following year was appointed as General Director of the People's Police (1948), with the rank of Lieutenant Colonel, a position he held until his death under mysterious circumstances on March 2, 1951. Ormeni served briefly as Deputy Minister of Interior, was a candidate of the Central Committee of the Labour Party in its First Congress (1948) and was elected as deputy of the People's Assembly.
