= Hysen Hoxha =

Albanian politician

- Born: 1861; Gjirokastër, Janina Vilayet, Ottoman Empire (modern-day Albania)
- Died: 1934 (aged 72–73); Gjirokastër, Albania
- Known for: Uncle of Enver Hoxha; Assembly of Vlorë 1912; Mayor of Gjirokastër
- Parent: Beqir Hoxha (father)
- Relatives: Halil Hoxha (brother), Enver Hoxha (nephew), Fahrije Hoxha (niece), Haxhire Hoxha (niece), Sanije Hoxha (niece)
- Family: Hoxha

Hysen Efendi Hoxha (1861–1934) was an Albanian politician, mayor of Gjirokastër, and the uncle of Enver Hoxha.

== Life ==
Hysen Hoxha was born in Gjirokastër, where his father Beqir was a supporter of the local branch of the League of Prizren. He studied theology in Istanbul. Hoxha was responsible for opening the first Albanian-language school in his region (named "Liria") and at the time of his nephew Enver Hoxha's birth in 1908, chaired a committee of national renaissance in the province. He also founded a folk ensemble. In November 1912, he served as a delegate from Gjirokastër to the Vlorë meeting on the occasion of the Albanian Declaration of Independence.

His impact on the early life of his nephew Enver Hoxha was felt due to Enver's father having been an economic emigrant overseas in the United States of America.
