= Company 4000 =

- Albanian: Kompanija 4000; German: Kompanie 4000
- Active: 1949–1958 (Cold War–era)
- Country: West Germany
- Allegiance: United States
- Role: Covert operation
- Size: 250
- Engagements: Cold War: Operation Valuable; Landing in Vlorë (1949)

Company 4000, also known as Kompania 4000, was a covert paramilitary organization established in West Germany in 1950, initiated by the American intelligence services in collaboration with the "Free Albania" committee and the CIA. It was initially a labour battalion. Its primary mission was to deploy paratroopers into Albania to undermine and overthrow Hoxha's regime.

They were initially trained in Karsfeld near Munich.

== See also ==
- Operation Valuable
