= Constitution of the People's Socialist Republic of Albania =

Supreme law of the People's Socialist Republic of Albania

The Constitution of the People's Socialist Republic of Albania was the communist state constitution used in the People's Socialist Republic of Albania. The constitution, promulgated on 28 December 1976, established Albania as a "People's Socialist Republic". The constitution was based on the original 1946 constitution that established post-World War II Albania as a "People's Republic".

== See also ==
- List of constitutions of Albania
- Agitation and Propaganda against the State
- Cultural and Ideological Revolution
- Albanian state atheism
