= Mustafa Band =

Anticommunistic group in Communist Albania

Xhevdet Mustafa

Halit Bajrami in court

The Mustafa Band was a group of four Albanian exiles who wanted to kill Enver Hoxha in 1982. The plan failed and two of its members were killed and one arrested.

== Members ==
- Sabaudin Hasnedar † (Dino) – chairman of the group. Born c. 1925, a marginalized communist and friend of Halit, and fled to Greece with him in 1950. After leaving Greece he settled in Italy, where he owner of a commercial laundry in Rome.
- Xhevdet Mustafa † (Jerry) – born 1940, fled Albania for the US in 1964 and settled to Staten Island, New York, where he operated a car repair company. Mustafa was associated with Albanian mafia boss Xhevdet Lika and obtained financing from Leka I, Crown Prince of Albania. All were allegedly in the drug trade and Mustafa was already facing a 1981 indictment, and fled the country. At the age of 42 he led the mission alongside Sabaudin.
- Halit Bajrami (Alex) – born 1925, friend of Sabaudin and fled to Greece with him in 1950. Halit settled in New Zealand where he became an agent of the Sigurimi, the Albanian secret police. He was 57 at the time of the mission.
- Fadil Kaceli (Fred) – brother of painter Sadik Kaceli. Date of birth unknown. Fadil settled in New Zealand. He returned to New Zealand after the failed mission.

== Operation ==
Though the personal motives for the infiltration are not clear, the former members and Albanian prosecutors concur that the objective was the assassination of Hoxha and the idea was hatched in 1975 at the wedding of the pretender to the Albanian throne King Leka I. The operation was also thought to have been backed by Yugoslavia as retaliation against the 1981 protests in Kosovo.

All four banded together in Italy in 1982, where they obtained supplies. Halit was an informant who obtained approval from the Sigurimi to participate in the mission. Halit planned to secure the group's capture by sending details of the operation to agency headquarters via contacts in Rome and Paris.

Although Fadil had planned to join the infiltration, he was injured just before the launch of the speedboat. Fadil recuperated in Italy then returned to his home in New Zealand. The remaining partisans crossed the Strait of Otranto and arrived at the Albanian coast on the night of 24–25 September 1982 near Divjakë. Albanian forces had been tipped off by Halit and were looking for the group at two landing points, but Xhevdet decided to change the plans due to Fadil's withdrawal. Xhevdet, Sabaudin, and Halit came ashore undetected and disappeared in the Karavasta forest, about 50 miles (90 km) away from Tirana. The group was equipped with rifles, pistols, binoculars, a radio transmitter, and money.

At dawn, Xhevdet and Sabaudin went exploring and killed two patrolmen who discovered them. They returned to Halit, and half an hour later a patrol boat approached them, ordering them to surrender. Xhevdet opened fire, killing two officers, and took a fisherman captive. They exited the forest and started along the road toward Tirana under the guise of a police patrol, debating on whether to travel on the roads or get to Tirana the same day. They arrived late that night at a small bridge northeast of Divjakë and rested.

The next morning, the civilian led the three gang members to the town of Rrogozhinë, where they found a train station. Halit purchased tickets for the afternoon train to Tirana. After a long wait, the group was approached by police officers, who asked Sabaudin for identification. Halit replied that they had no papers and were all saboteurs.

Halit was taken into custody by the officers. Xhevdet fled, stealing a FSC Żuk delivery van. Sabaudin also fled, jumping into a bunker where a standoff ensured. Sabaudin attempted to rally forces to join him on the march to Tirana, but was shot by riflemen in the firefight and committed suicide. Meanwhile, Xhevdet drove southwest, stopping to carjack a driver who drove them to Lushnjë. He hid in a residence, taking the family hostage for two hours. Xhevdet shot himself as an armored vehicle knocked down one of the walls.

== Aftermath ==
Halit, the sole survivor of the three who arrived in Albania, was held in protective custody for questioning and testified in 1983 against the former Minister of Defence Kadri Hazbiu, who had been removed from his post on 10 October 1982 and was suspected of working for Yugoslavia and the CIA, as well as providing hiding places for the group. Hazbiu was convicted of abuse of office and executed in 1983. Halit Bajrami was released and returned to his home in New Zealand. Hoxha later died from a heart attack on April 11, 1985.

The exiled Leka (I), Crown Prince of Albania, denied authorizing the operation, claiming both that it was suicidal and that it was done without his knowledge.
