= Sadik Kaceli =

Albanian painter

- Born: Sadik Osman Kaceli; 14 March 1914; Tirana, Albania
- Died: 24 December 2000 (aged 86); Tirana, Albania
- Resting place: Varrezat e Sharres, Tirana, Albania
- Education: Henri Matisse & Académie des Beaux-Arts, Paris, France
- Known for: Painting, drawing, sculpture, printmaking, ceramics
- Movement: Realism
- Awards: People's Artist Merited Artist Honor of the Nation

Sadik Kaceli (14 March 1914 – 24 December 2000) was an Albanian artist. He studied in Paris at the École nationale supérieure des Beaux-Arts (1936–1941). Kaceli is one of Albania's best known painters, receiving many decorations as People's Artist of Albania and the Honor Citizen of Tirana medal. He created the first series of the Albanian lek. In 2016 Sadik Kaceli was given the Honor of Nation Order. He is one of the founders of the National Art Gallery of Albania and designed the coat of arms and flag for the People's Republic of Albania.

== Biography ==
Kaceli attended the Harry T. Fultz Technical school from 1929, and began a drawing course in 1931.

He was the brother of Jonuz Kaceli, a well-known businessman and dissident of the Communist Regime in Albania. Fadil Kaceli, is also a brother of Sadik. His son, Buron Kaceli, is also a painter and former politician, deputy in Parliament of Albania, Vice Mayor of Albania's capital, Tirana, and the countries Director of Culture.

A monografi of Sadik Kaceli was released in 2008 and translated into English in 2009. It contains the story of his life, works, unpublished notes, admiration and gratitude. A street in Tirana is named after Kaceli. He died on 24 December 2000.

== Gallery ==
People's Republic of Albania's coat of arms, made by Sadik Kaceli

People's Republic of Albania's flag, made by Sadik Kaceli

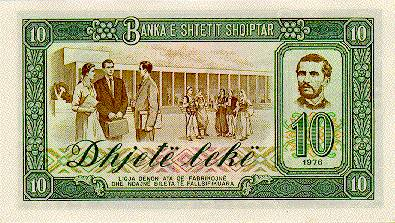
First version of the Albanian lek, designed by Sadik Kaceli

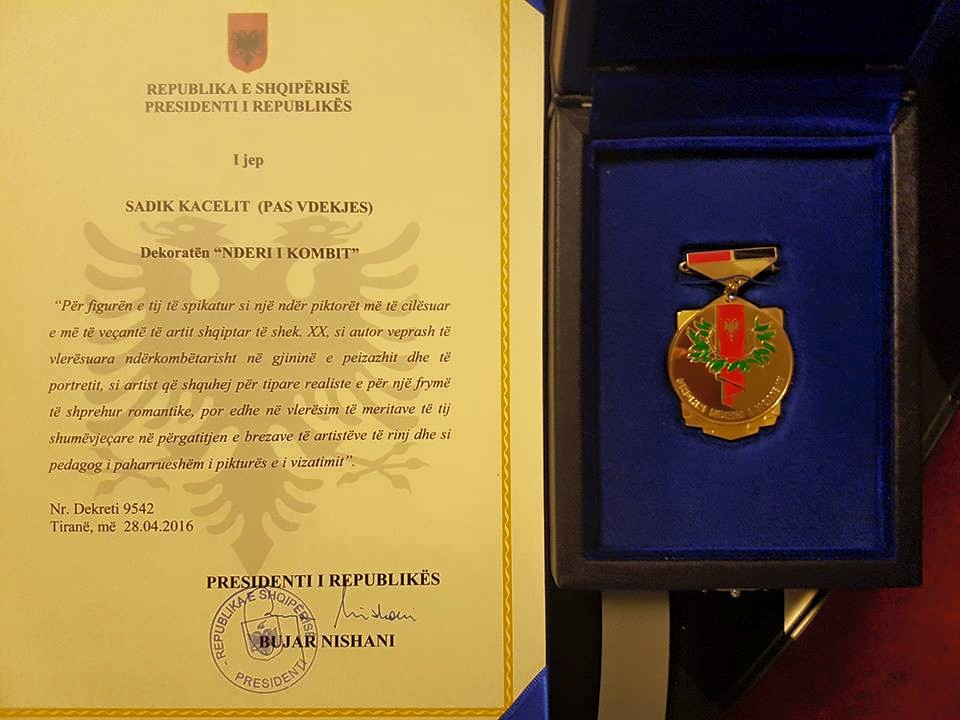
Honor of Nation Order given to Sadik Kaceli by Albanian former President, Bujar Nishani.
