= Jonuz Kaceli =

Albanian businessman

- Born: Jonuz Osman Kaceli; 20 June 1908; Tirana
- Died: 25 February 1951 (aged 42); Tirana
- Cause of death: execution
- Body discovered: 1992
- Resting place: Tirana
- Citizenship: Albanian
- Occupation: Businessman
- Years active: 1930–1951
- Organization: Osman Kaceli e djemtë
- Known for: Benefactory deeds
- Criminal charge: No process
- Criminal penalty: Death penalty
- Criminal status: Innocent after process of 1991
- Awards: Martyr of Democracy

Jonuz Kaceli (20 June 1908 – 25 February 1951) was an Albanian businessman and dissident of the communist regime in Albania. He was one of the 23 victims of the regime's Massacre of 1951 in Albania.

== Life ==
Jonuz Kaceli was born in 1908 in Tirana. Prior to his arrest and killing, he had been a well known businessman in Albania, as the co-owner in the company Osman Kaceli e djemtë, which had been one of the first companies registered in Tirana, Albania after the Albanian Declaration of Independence in 1912. He was also the brother of Sadik Kaceli, a famous Albanian painter. Qemal Stafa, a notable World War II hero, had been a company employee prior to his death in 1942.

== Importance ==
Kaceli had been an important person in the business community of Tirana. He allegedly punched Mehmet Shehu in the face and lightly injured him during such interrogations. As a result, according to a witness who told the story in 1993, he was thrown from the second floor of the Ministry of the Interior building and thus killed one day prior to the rest of the victims of the massacre, on 25 February 1951. He was survived by his wife and seven children, all of whom were sent to Albanian gulags after the killing took place.

== Recognition ==
In 2008, his act was recognized by the President of Albania, Bamir Topi, and Kaceli was posthumously awarded the medal of Martyr of Democracy. His body is now buried at the Albanian National Martyrs' Cemetery (Albanian: Dëshmorët e Kombit).

== See also ==
- Sadik Kaceli
