= Albanian Civil War (1943–1944) =

- Part of World War II in Albania
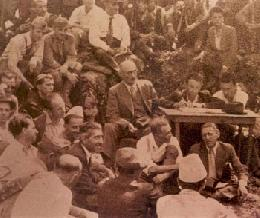
- A photo of the Mukje Conference (1943).
Date	1 October 1943 – 29 November 1944
Location	German-occupied Albania
Result	LANÇ/allied victory: Establishment of the Democratic Government of Albania.; Mid'hat Frashëri and Abaz Kupi flee Albania.; Start of the Anti-Communist Uprisings in Albania.

Belligerents
LANÇ	Balli Kombëtar (Albania) Legaliteti; Gheg Albanian Tribes
Supported by: United Kingdom; Soviet Union; Yugoslavia; Italian Partisans	Supported by: Germany; Italian Social Republic

Commanders and leaders
Enver Hoxha; Spiro Moisiu; Dalip Ndreu; Mehmet Shehu; Mehmet Bajraktari; Gjin Marku; Tahir Kadare; Hysen Stafa; Hulusi Spahia; Zija Kambo; Baba Faja Martaneshi; Haxhi Lleshi; Vasil Shanto X Ali Demi X Skënder Libohova † (United Kingdom) Edmund Davies (POW) (United Kingdom) Arthur Nicholls † (Yugoslav Partisans) Miladin Popović (Yugoslav Partisans) Tomica Popović (Yugoslav Partisans) Mile Čalović	(Albania) Abaz Kupi (AWOL) (Albania) Ndoc Çoba; Mit'hat Frashëri; Ali Këlcyra; Abas Ermenji; Aziz Çami X Xhem Hasa; Kadri Cakrani; Hysni Lepenica †; Mefail Shehu; Skënder Muço (executed); Kol Tromara (executed); Ismail Haki Tatzati (executed); Muharrem Bajraktari; Halil Alia †; Gjon Markagjoni; Prenk Pervizi (Nazi Germany) Maximilian von Weichs (Nazi Germany) Alexander Löhr

The Albanian Civil War was an armed conflict that took place alongside World War II in Albania. The war was fought between LANÇ on one side, and Balli Kombëtar and Legality Movement on the other. The conflict was a classic confrontation between two Albanian political currents, the right-wing and the left-wing. The conflict began after the breakdown of the Mukje Agreement by the Communists, following the orders of the Yugoslav envoys stationed with them.

== Prelude ==
From August 1–3, 1943, in the village of Mukaj in Krujë, under the influence of Abaz Kupi, a joint meeting was held between the delegates of LANÇ and Balli Kombëtar. The purpose was to unite Albanian forces under a single front to fight against the occupiers. Initially, discussions began in the village of Tapizë, near Krujë, on July 26, before being moved to Mukje. The two groups reached an agreement in principle and signed the Mukje Agreement, which proposed the formation of the Committee for the Salvation of Albania, a united front against the occupiers, and the creation of a Greater Albania.

=== Text of the Mukje Agreement ===
"Today, on August 1, 1943 (01.08.1943), in the village of Mukje, the second meeting was held between the delegations of Balli Kombëtar and LANÇ."

The chairmanship of the meeting was unanimously entrusted to Mr. Thoma Orollogaj, with Mustafa Gjinishi as secretary. The discussions were opened by Mr. Hasan Dosti, a delegate of Balli Kombëtar, who declared that after consultations with the leadership of Balli Kombëtar, the minutes of the agreement made on July 25, 1943, signed "a referendum" by the delegation of Balli Kombëtar, it was deemed necessary to review certain points of the reached accord.

The following points were discussed and decided:

- Point One of Article Two was amended to read as follows:
  - Immediate war against the occupying enemy and any other potential occupying enemy.
- Point Two: War for an independent Albania and the implementation of the universally recognized principle guaranteed by the Atlantic Charter of the self-determination of peoples for an Ethnic Albania.
- Point Three: Amended and accepted as follows: A free, independent, democratic, and popular Albania.
- Point Four: Amended and accepted as follows: The Council for the Salvation of Albania (K.SH.SH.) will lead to the formation of a provisional government.
- Point Five: Amended and accepted as follows: The form of the regime (the future of Albania) will be determined by the people themselves through a Constituent Assembly elected by universal direct suffrage.

=== Participating delegations ===
- Balli Kombëtar Delegates:

Hasan Dosti, Mid'hat Frashëri, Thoma Orollogaj, Skënder Muço, Hysni Lepenica, Isuf Luzaj, Kadri Cakrani, Major Raif Fratani, Nexhat Peshkëpia, Halil Mëniku, Ismail Petrela, and Vasil Andoni.

- LANÇ Delegates:

Lieutenant Colonel Jahja Çaçi, Myslim Peza, Abaz Kupi, Ymer Dishnica, Mustafa Gjinishi, Omer Nishani, Sulo Bogdo, Shefqet Boja, Medar Shtylla, Haki Stërmilli, G. Nushi, and a certain Stefan.

== Deterioration of the Mukje Agreement ==
The agreement came to be criticized as "a betrayal of the people and revolution" and "against the fundamental principles of the Conference of Pezë".

After failure of the agreement, Balli Kombëtar chose to openly collaborate with the Germans after the capitulation of Italy, while the Communist Party of Albania continued to fight alongside the Yugoslav Partisans. Legaliteti would continue fighting against the fascist armies, but the distance between them and the Communists would get larger and larger. The communists would consider them counterrevolutionary by the end of the war.

The communists' history in the following decades would criticize the agreement and its protagonists (including Dishnica and Gjinishi), and consider it a trap from the Balli side.

== Civil War ==
=== Southern Albania ===
Southern Albania served as the primary theater of the Civil War, as the two main factions, LANÇ and Balli Kombëtar, were heavily concentrated in the region. Both sides, carried out massacres and assassinations, leaving hundreds dead across the south. On September 8, 1943, the Front executed six Ballist youth in the village of Ziçisht. Clashes had also occurred earlier, with a notable one in Libohovë in August.

October 1, 1943, is considered the official start of the civil war. On that date, in a letter to the Central Committee of the Communist Party in Gjirokastër, Enver Hoxha declared:

- "The unity with Balli Kombëtar is now a dead issue and will no longer be discussed. Now the priority is their destruction."

On the same day, Hoxha issued a circular letter to Liri Gega ("Muzhiku") and all regional committees of the Communist Party, instructing them to initiate war against Balli Kombëtar, disregarding all circumstances and consequences:

- "Political work against Balli is not enough in these cases; it must support decisive military actions. Meetings and conferences are insufficient; power must be seized immediately."

The communists struck first, catching the Ballists off guard, as their leader, Hysni Lepenica, had died in a clash with the Italians on September 16. Three days later, another Ballist commander, Safet Butka, committed suicide.

From mid-October onwards, violence escalated:

- October 13: Communists massacred two Ballists in Melçem, Korçë.
- October 13–18: Eight innocent civilians were killed in Pogradec during clashes.
- October 16: Battles in Libofshë left 21 Partisans and 10 Ballists dead.
- October 21: Partisan forces led by Mehmet Shehu captured and massacred 68 Ballist soldiers in a village near Lushnjë.
- Additional massacres occurred in Çermenikë (70 Ballists executed), Kuçovë, Kavajë, and elsewhere.

In November, the Ballists reorganized and launched a counterattack, aided by the German winter offensive against Partisan forces. While some Ballist groups joined German efforts, others regrouped in Berat, Korçë, and Gjirokastër. However, the communists, with support from British missions, broke the German-Ballist encirclement and concentrated their forces in Berat and Elbasan. By December, Balli had lost control of southern Albania and retreated northward with the Germans.

The communists intensified their campaigns of terror, committing massacres across Vlorë, Mallakastër, and Voskopojë (where a mass grave of 185 bodies was found). Notable battles included:

- Battle of Dukat (November 30): 14 Partisans and 10 Ballists killed.
- Battle of Gjorm: 52 homes burned after 26 hours of fighting.
- Additional clashes in Mavrovë, Vlorë, Gjirokastër, and Berat.

=== Northern Albania ===
As Balli retreated north, fighting shifted to central and northern Albania. In March 1944, the communists clashed with Ballist forces led by Nezir Muzhaqi in Polis, Elbasan, Xhem Hasa in Dibër. By spring and summer, battles expanded to central Albania in areas such as Kavajë, Shijak, and Tirana.

In fall 1944, the communists launched attacks in Kosovo, targeting Ballist forces led by Ejup Binaku, as well as nationalist groups in Shkodër and Dukagjin organized by the Kazazi brothers, Mark Sadiku, and Ndue Pali. On June 1, 1944, the First Assault Division advanced into central and northern Albania, engaging Ballist forces in Çermenikë, Librazhd, and Zaranikë.

In Tirana, the 5th Brigade fought against the Legality Movement's headquarters at Tujan Pass. Abaz Kupi withdrew to avoid further civil war, informing King Zog of the bloodshed. In Mat, Partisans clashed with Legality forces, including a battle in Fushë-Aliaj on July 9, where 21 Partisans were killed.

The northern nationalist leaders, caught unprepared and divided, were defeated more easily than Balli in the south. Notable incidents included:

- August 21: Anti-communist forces killed five Partisans in Vig, Shkodër.
- August 29: Partisans burned the towers of Gjon Markagjoni.

In May 1944 Mit'hat Frashëri sent to the nationalist party of Napoleon Zervas in Greece a letter asking for the creation of a Greek-Albanian federation after the end of the War. The main points of the letter were:

- The question of creating a federation that would depend on the opportunities created after the war. Both sides pledged that they were ready to work towards the realization of this project.
- The connecting link will be the independence and full sovereignty of both sides (Greece-Albania).
- The Greek-Albanian borders remain those of 1939 and an official declaration will be made.
- They undertake the implementation of a defensive and offensive alliance as well as the development of military ties.
- Conclusion of financial agreements between the two parties.
- Efforts to ensure that this connection is made as soon as possible, as well as a Greek-Turkish-Albanian connection.
- In the event of war, general military command will be handed over to Greece.

In August 1944, nationalist forces regrouped in Preza, Tirana, forming a government led by Mit'hat Frashëri as prime minister and Abaz Kupi as commander of the armed forces. Despite some regional alliances, such as those in Luma, Lura, Mat, and Dibër, the communists' numerical superiority prevailed.

From September 21–23, clashes in Kukës resulted in five civilian deaths. On September 25, Partisans under Shefqet Peçi massacred 21 villagers in Buzëmadhe, Kukës. Muharrem Bajraktari narrowly escaped an ambush by communist forces during failed peace negotiations.

Communists also targeted forces led by Gani Kryeziu in the Gjakova Highlands. On November 28–29, 1944, Shkodër fell to Partisans, and Albania was entirely under communist control.

== Aftermath ==
After the war, anti-communist forces organized the Committee of the Mountains, which led anti-communist movements in the northern regions of Albania. In 1945 and 1946, two major anti-communist uprisings took place in Postribë and Koplik, but both failed. The communist regime created the Forcat e Ndjekjes (Pursuit Forces) to track and eliminate anti-communist leaders, particularly Muharrem Bajraktari and Gjon Markagjoni.

== See also ==
- List of wars involving Albania
- History of Albania
- World War II in Albania
- German winter offensive in Albania (1943-1944)
- Bujan Conference
- Kosovo Operation (1944)
- The Kelmend uprising
- Legality Movement
- Albanian Offensive into Yugoslavia

== Sources ==
- Ermenji, Abas (1996). Vendi që zë Skënderbeu në historinë e Shqipërisë (in Albanian). Çabej.
