= Halil Mëniku =

Albanian politician and publisher

Halil Mëniku (died June 4, 1967) was an Albanian politician and publisher. He served as mayor of Tiranë from 1943 to 1944.

== Life ==
He was born in Tirana, Ottoman Empire. In 1935 he published the journal Jeta dhe Kultura (English: Life and Culture). A member of Balli Kombëtar's central committee, Mëniku had joined the anti-Italian military bands in 1942. In 1943 after Italy's capitulation and the German takeover he became vice-kommissar of Tiranë and acted as mayor of the city. At the same time, he also represented Balli Kombëtar along with Skënder Muço, Hysni Lepenica, Mit’hat Frashëri and Hasan Dosti in the Mukje Assembly, which determined a short-lived national salvation government between the nationalist and communist factions. After the communist victory, he fled to western Europe. Mëniku was the head of the International Peasants' Union in Rome and a director of the press bureau of the "Free Albania" National Committee. He died on June 4, 1967, in Paris and was buried at the cemetery of Thiais.
