= Hafëz Jusuf Azemi =

Albanian politician (1920–2023)

Jusuf Azemi Hafiz
- Born: 2 August 1920; Dobrošte, South Serbia, Kingdom of Serbs, Croats and Slovenes (now Dobrošte, North Macedonia)
- Died: 12 March 2023 (aged 102); Chicago, Illinois, U.S.
- Political party: Balli Kombëtar; Free Albania National Committee; Union of Kosovars

Hafëz Jusuf Azemi (born in Dobrošte – died 2023) was a member of the Balli Kombëtar, an Albanian nationalist and anti-communist organization, and later an Albanian political activist in exile.

Azemi was a fighter in the Dobrošte unit of the Balli Kombëtar during World War II. Following the defeat of nationalist forces and the rise of communist rule in Yugoslavia, he was forced into exile. In 1945, he settled in Bari, Italy, where he established contact with prominent Albanian nationalist exiles including Mid'hat Frashëri, Vasil Andoni, Zef Pali, and Hasan Dosti. These individuals had fled Albania after the establishment of the communist regime led by Enver Hoxha.

Azemi later emigrated to the United States, where he settled in Chicago. While in exile, he continued to advocate for the rights and freedoms of Albanians in Yugoslavia. In response to Western support for Yugoslav unity—including a noted incident in London where Mid'hat Frashëri was reprimanded by British authorities for referring to Kosovo—Azemi co-founded the Union of Kosovars (Lidhja Kosovare) along with Abas Ermenji and Luan Gashi. He was also active in organizing several other Albanian diaspora groups in the United States.

== Death and legacy ==
Hafëz Jusuf Azemi died on February 12, 2023, at the age of 103. He is remembered for his long-standing commitment to the Albanian national cause and his efforts to promote the unification of Albanian territories and the preservation of Albanian identity, particularly in exile. Azemi was a significant figure within the Albanian diaspora, where he was recognized for his dedication to the ideals of Albanian nationalism.

In 2012, Professor Riza Sadiku published a monograph on Azemi’s life and political activities, describing him as an influential figure in the Albanian national movement from exile. In his memoirs, Azemi frequently quoted the words of Mid'hat Frashëri: “The final words of Albanianism belong to Prishtina and Tetova,” reflecting his view on the importance of these cities in the broader Albanian national question.

Azemi’s legacy continues to be associated with his involvement in Balli Kombëtar and his contributions to the Albanian diaspora's political activism. His life and work are often cited by those involved in the preservation of Albanian identity and the pursuit of Albanian national unity.

== Notes ==
a.	Albanian spelling: Hafëz Jusuf Azemi, Serbo-Croat spelling: Hafez Jusuf Azemi, Хафез Јусуф Аземи.
