= Sejfi Protopapa =

Albanian scientist

- Born: February 20, 1923; Berat, Principality of Albania
- Died: April 13, 2014 (aged 91); Wayland, Massachusetts, U.S.
- Education: University of Perugia (dropped out); Rutgers University; University of California
- Organization: "Free Albania" National Committee
- Political party: Balli Kombëtar

Sejfi Protopapa was an Albanian physicist and nationalist fighter with social democratic views who opposed the Albanian Monarchy and Communism.

== Biography ==
=== Early life ===
He continued his education in Italy at the University of Perugia. Despite this, Sejfi joined the Albanian partisans.

On 13 September 1943, an envelope was dropped off in the office of the KPSH. With no signs of the letter stating to be confidential or addressed to anyone, Sejfi reviewed the content to find that it was a directive by Shpati (The pseudonym for The Party's Secretary, Enver Hoxha) to all district committees of the KPSH to focus their efforts on eliminating the Balli Kombëtar. At that time, the Mukja Agreement was in place to ensure that both the Partisans and the National Front joined their efforts together to fight the fascist forces.

Feeling shocked and morally uneasy that the KPSH was in the process of breaking the Besa of the Mukje Agreement and commit fratricide on fellow Albanians, Sejfi took the envelope and went straight to Abas Ermenji, the chairman of the Balli Kombëtar for the district of Berat. Ermenji took the letter to be published in the Flamuri Newspaper, the media arm of the Balli Kombëtar. With the Partisans looking to eliminate Sejfi, Sejfi officially joined the Ballist forces and commanded a battalion of 150.
