= Botsaris =

Botsaris or Mpotsaris is a surname. Notable people with the surname include:

- Chris Clark (reporter) (born 1938), American journalist
- Dimitrios Botsaris (1813–1871), Greek soldier and politician
- Katerina Botsari (1820–1872), member of the Souliot Botsaris family
- Kitsos Botsaris (1741–1809), Souliot captain
- Kostas Botsaris (1792–1853), Greek general and politician
- Markos Botsaris (1788–1823), Souliot captain and hero of the Greek War of Independence
- Panagiotis "Notis" Botsaris (1756–1841), Souliote leader and fighter, son of Kitsos Botsaris

== See also ==
- Gëzim Boçari (b. 1949), Albanian professor of pharmacology and a politician
- Ismail Boçari (1917–2014), Albanian professor of medicine
- Castle of Gjon Boçari, a castle of the 16th and 17th century in Tragjas, Albania
