= Battle of Tirana and Kruja (1943) =

WWII conflict between Albanians and Italians

- Part of World War II in Albania
Date	23 August 1943
Location	Tirana and Kruja, Albania
Result	Albanian victory

Belligerents
Balli Kombetar; LANÇ	Italy

Commanders and leaders
Midhat Frashëri; Bujar Gjakdhe	(Kingdom of Italy) Colonel Scarpa †

Strength
300 Ballists; 40 Albanian Partisans	Unknown

Casualties and losses
Unknown	150–250 killed 14 captured

The Battle in the area of Tirana and Kruja (Albanian: Beteja E Tiranes dhe Kruje) took place between Albanian resistance fighters against Italian fascist occupiers of Albania.

== Battle ==
On August 4, 1943, after the Mukje Conference, LANÇ and Balli Kombetar prepared for an operation against the Italian forces. Albanian resistance forces began the operation with a strength of around 340 men, led by commander Abaz Kupi.

== Aftermath ==
During the battles around 150-250 Italian soldiers died, 14 were captured and many of the supplies such as weapons and ammunition were captured by the Albanians.
