= Kurtez ambush =

Conflict during Albanian Resistance of World War II

- Part of the Albanian Resistance of World War II
| Date | August 12, 1943 |
| Location | Kurtez, Albania |
| Result | Ballist victory |

Belligerents
| Balli Kombëtar | (Nazi Germany) Germany |

Commanders and leaders
| Qemal Burimi (United Kingdom) David Smiley | (Nazi Germany) Unknown |

Strength
| 200 | (Nazi Germany) 250 |

Casualties and losses
| None | (Nazi Germany) 30–35 killed (Nazi Germany) 4 trucks (Nazi Germany) 1 field gun |

The Kurtez ambush occurred on August 12, 1943, near the village of Kurtez in the Kolonjë District of Korçë County in southeastern Albania. It was carried out by Balli Kombëtar during the Albanian Resistance of World War II. Two hundred local Balli Kombëtar militants, commanded by Qemal Burimi and David Smiley, ambushed a German convoy and a troop carrier, inflicting heavy losses on the German troops.

== Background ==
After the Italian occupation of Albania in 1939, several resistance groups gradually formed. One of the most important of these groups was Balli Kombëtar, a nationalist organization led by Mit'hat Frashëri and Ali Këlcyra.

In mid-1943 the Special Operations Executive (SOE), a British clandestine organisation, sent several agents to Albania to cooperate with Balli Kombëtar and the Albanian National Liberation Front. David Smiley, one of the SOE agents, contacted a unit of two hundred Balli Kombëtar soldiers under the command of Qemal Burimi. After assembling at the village of Kurtez they decided to carry out an ambush against German troops on the main road near Kurtez connecting Korçë to Ioannina.

== Ambush ==
The Albanian troops were positioned along the road and Smiley laid sixteen mines in two groups of eight on either side of the road about 250 yards (230 m) apart. Shortly afterwards a large German troop-carrier towing an 88 mm gun approached and was blown up on one of the two groups of mines. The German soldiers that were not killed by the explosion were shot by the Ballists while they were trying to escape by running back along the road. Eighteen German soldiers were killed, twelve of them while in the troop-carrier. The captured gun was pushed into the river-bed below the road.

About a half-hour later, a German convoy of twenty-three trucks approached the ambuscade from the direction of Leskovik. The first truck blew up on the second group of mines, while Smiley fired a 20 mm Breda gun on the following trucks, resulting in two of them bursting into flames. The Ballists shot down five German soldiers who tried to escape. The Albanian troops suffered no casualties during the attack. The German troops were from the 1st Alpine Division.
