= Orologas =

Orologas (Greek: Ωρολογάς) is a Greek surname. It means "watchmaker" (occupational surname). Its female version is Orologa (Greek: Ωρολογά).

== Notable examples ==
- Gregory Orologas (1864–1922), Greek Orthodox metropolitan bishop
- Petros Orologas (1892–1958), journalist and newspaper publisher

== See also ==
- Thoma Orologa
