= Tragjas =

- Village
- Location within Albania
- Coordinates: 40°19′N 19°30′E
- Country: Albania
- County: Vlorë
- Municipality: Vlorë
- Administrative unit: Orikum
- Time zone: UTC+1 (CET)
  - Summer (DST): UTC+2 (CEST)

Tragjas is a community in the Vlorë County, southwestern Albania. With the 2015 local government reform, it became part of the municipality Vlorë.

== History ==
The village has been inhabited since ancient times where the ruins of the city of Sofa are located near old Tragjas dating to the Illyrian tribes to the IV century BCE.

The village revolted in 1432 and the castle of Sofa was ruined by the Ottomans. The village joined Skanderbeg's rebellion in 1444 and Gjon Boçari from the village built a second castle in the village.

The village continued to join local rebellions during the following years: 1537,1581,1833 and 1847 and in 1912 it supported greatly the Albanian founding fathers.

During World War II, Tragjas was part of the battlefield of the battle of Gjorm, where Albanian resistance units defeated and routed the troops of the Kingdom of Italy.

Tragjas was burned twice during WW2, first by Italians on 7 August 1943 and later by the Nazis on 5 August 1944.

== Notable people ==
- Skënder Muço, Balli Kombëtar leader
- Gjon Boçari, castellan
- Ismail Boçari, professor and partisan
