= Rexhep Krasniqi =

Albanian-American historian and politician (1906–1999)

Dr. Rexhep Krasniqi
- Born: April 24, 1906; Gjakovë, Kosovo Vilayet, Ottoman Empire
- Died: February 12, 1999 (aged 92); New York City, New York, United States
- Occupations: Teacher, journalist
- Known for: Second League of Prizren; Free Albania Committee

Rexhep Krasniqi (24 April 1906 – 12 February 1999) was an Albanian-American historian, teacher, nationalist, and anti-communist politician and activist. A Kosovar Albanian, he is remembered for his role in the Second League of Prizren, and long time leadership of the "Free Albania" National Committee.

Krasniqi was born in Gjakova on 24 April 1906. He remained an orphan at a very young age and was raised in Bajram Curri's family. As a close acquaintance of the Curri, he was given a scholarship from the Albanian government and sent to study in Austria in 1921. There he studied in Graz and later in the Theresianum of Vienna. He would remain there until his graduation from the University of Vienna in history. He received a doctorate (PhD) there with the thesis "The Congress of Berlin and north-eastern Albania" in 1934, led by Carl Patsch. After that he returned to Albania.

Krasniqi worked as a teacher in Shkodër, Gjirokastër. In 1937 he went to Tirana where he worked again as a teacher for a short time, after which he started as an official in the Ministry of Education of Albania.

Shortly after the Italian invasion of Albania in April 1939, Krasniqi was arrested and interned for a short time in the "Porto Palermo" camp due to his nationalistic views. With his return to Albania, he was sent to Kosovo (at that time part of the Albanian Kingdom) and appointed principal of the first (newly established) Albanian language school in Pristina. There he became close to Xhafer Deva and Rexhep Mitrovica. Krasniqi became part of the leadership of the Second League of Prizren. He proceeded further in politics, becoming a member of the Albanian Parliament in 1943. He was appointed later as Minister of Education in the cabinet of Fiqri Dine, also serving as deputy-chairman of the Parliament.

With the Communists coming to power in Albania and Kosovo being reinstated as part of Yugoslavia, Krasniqi, with other leaders of the Second League of Prizren, went first to Vienna via Zagreb. He then went to Italy and Turkey and then to Syria where he stayed a short time. After Syria, he settled in Melbourne, Australia. With an invitation from US State Department and the support of Xhafer Deva, he settled in the United States in 1954. There he took over the leadership of the "Free Albania" National Committee from Hasan Dosti. The committee was an opponent of the Communist regime of Enver Hoxha, and comprised key anti-communist Albanian emigres. The Committee served as a government-in-exile until 1955 when Albania joined the UN. After that, the Committee continued to organize political gatherings, conferences, and seminars. Over 15,000 Albanian refugees were resettled in the United States through its efforts. Krasniqi published the newspaper The Free Albanian (Albanian: Shqiptari i Lirë) from November 1957 to 1970. He was also a regular member of the Assembly of Captive European Nations (ACEN).

Krasniqi died in New York City in 1999.

== See also ==
- Mustafa Kruja
- Third League of Prizren
