= Dobrošte =

Dobrošte Доброште Dobrosht
- Village
- Location within North Macedonia
- Coordinates: 42°06′N 21°05′E
- Country: North Macedonia
- Region: Polog
- Municipality: Tearce

Population (2021)
  - Total: 2,649
- Time zone: UTC+1 (CET)
  - Summer (DST): UTC+2 (CEST)
- Car plates: TE
- Website: .

Dobrošte (Macedonian: Доброште, Albanian: Dobrosht) is a village 15 km northeast of Tetovo, North Macedonia, along the highway from Tetovo to Globocica. Under the new territorial division, Dobroste was moved from the Tetovo municipality to the new municipality of Tearce.

== History ==
Prior to Ottoman rule, the population of Dobrošte consisted of Albanian Catholics, as there were four Albanian Catholic churches in the village in addition to Christian graves with Albanian inscriptions. Due to Ottoman influence, most of the Albanians converted to Islam.

In 1453, Dobroste consisted of 48 families according to Turkish-Ottoman data.

Dobrošte is attested in the 1467/68 Ottoman tax registry (defter) for the Nahiyah of Kalkandelen. The village had a total of 160 Christian households, 10 bachelors and 21 widows.

In World War II, 71 people were killed by the Yugoslav Partisans.

=== Albanian nationalism ===
Dobroste was the birthplace of many Albanian nationalists. In 1917, Isen Hasani and Kadri Azemi fought against the Serbian Army in Skopska Crna Gora, where they were eventually killed. From 1940 to 1945, Dobroste was headquarters of one of the Balli Kombetar units in the northwest of Macedonia. The most notable of these Ballists were Isen Rustemi and Halil Ivaja, as well as Ramadan Ramadani, Mete Azizi, Brahim Halimi, Llokman Lutfiu, and Hafez Jusuf Azemi.

== Geography ==
Coordinates: 42° 6′ 12″ N, 21° 4′ 40″ E,
Elevation: 494 meters
Population: Approximately 2,649

== Demographics ==
As of the 2021 census, Dobrošte had 2,649 residents with the following ethnic composition:

- Albanians 2,308
- Macedonians 288
- Persons for whom data are taken from administrative sources 40
- Others 13

According to the 2002 census, the village had a population of 3,549. Ethnic groups in the village include:

- Albanians 3,160
- Macedonians 345
- Serbs 3
- Turks 2
- Bosniaks 1
- Others 38

In statistics gathered by Vasil Kanchov in 1900, the village of Dobrošte (Dobroshte) was inhabited by 220 Christian Bulgarians and 196 Muslim Albanians.

== Notable people ==
- Hafëz Jusuf Azemi
