= Vasil Andoni =

Albanian teacher and politician (1901–1994)

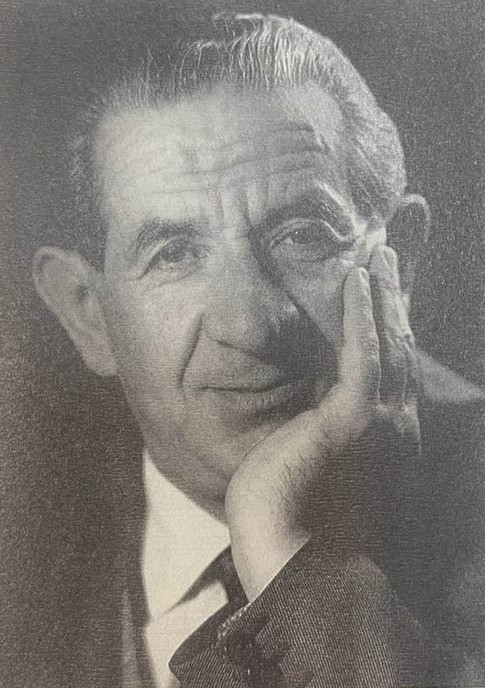

Secretary General of Balli Kombëtar

Personal details
- Born: 28 January 1901 Elbasan, Ottoman Empire (present-day Albania)
- Died: 7 October 1994 (aged 93) Rome, Italy
- Party: Balli Kombëtar
- Occupation: Teacher

Vasil Andoni (January 28, 1901 – July 13, 1994) was an Albanian politician and teacher. He was the Secretary General and one of leaders the Balli Kombëtar active in World War II in Albania.

== Biography ==
Vasil studied at Robert College in Constantinople, then took a job at the Elbasan Normal School in his hometown. He became a teacher at a high school in Tirana in 1939 and taught in Prishtina in the early 1940s.

In 1942, he joined the Nationalist National Front led by Midhat Frashëri and became its General Secretary. During the battles between the Communist-led National Liberation Movement and the National Front, he joined the National Front units fighting in the mountains of Central Albania in late 1943. Unlike many of his party counterparts, he opposed collaboration with German invaders.

Seeing the overwhelming advance of the Communist guerrilla brigades, along with other leaders of the National Front, Frashëri, Ali Këlcyra and Hasan Dosti, they left for Shkodra on October 18, 1944, with a small fishing boat, and on October 23, they sailed south of Bris. He first settled in Rome and wrote for the anti-communist newspapers Albania libre ('Free Albania') and Flamuri ('The Flag'). He emigrated to New York, in 1949, along with Midhat Frashëri, and until his death was a leading figure in the Albanian expatriate community in the United States. He never returned to his homeland.

== Ideology ==
Vasil Andoni along with Abaz Ermenji, Zef Pali and Halil Maçi was part of the agrarian socialist and progressive wing of the party, which gained the leadership of the party after the war. He expressed himself as having "no religion" when he left Albania.

== Sources ==
- Elsie, Robert (2013). A biographical dictionary of Albanian history. London; New York: Tauris. ISBN 978-1-78076-431-3.
- Pearson, Owen (2005). Albania in occupation and war: From fascism to communism. Albania In the Twentieth Century, 2. London; New York: Centre for Albanian Studies. ISBN 1845110145.
