= Ismail Boçari =

Albanian professor of medicine

Ismail Boçari (1917 – 11 May 2014) was an Albanian professor of medicine. During World War II he took part in the Albanian National Liberation Front. He has received several awards for his activities.

Ismail Boçari was born in 1917 in Tragjas, Vlorë, southwestern Albania. He has studied medicine in the University of Bologna and the University of Sofia. During the Albanian resistance of World War II he escaped from execution from Italian and German troops three times in 1942, 1943 and 1944. In 1993 he received the Castriota Scanderbeg award for his activities during World War II. In 1999 he was decorated with the medal National Cavalier of Italy by Massimo D'Alema at a ceremony that took place in Rome.
