= Skënder Muço =

Albanian lawyer

Skënder Muço (1904–1944) was an Albanian lawyer and leader of Balli Kombëtar, one of the most important resistance organizations in Albania during World War II. Along with Musine Kokalari Muço founded the first social democratic party of Albania in 1943. In 1944 he was ambushed by German troops near Vlorë and executed three days later.

== Early life ==
Skënder Muço was born in Tragjas, Ottoman Empire, in 1904. His father, Daut, was an activist of the Albanian National Awakening, while his uncle, Alem Tragjasi, had fought in the Vlora War. Muço initially studied in San Demetrio Corone, Calabria, and later graduated from the faculty of law of the University of Bologna. In 1932 he was arrested and sentenced to death because of his participation in the nationalist and anti-monarchist organization Lëvizja e Vlorës (English: Vlora Movement), but his sentence was eventually reduced after public pressure on the government. When Albania was occupied by Italy he took part in the protests of Vlorë on April 7, 1939.

== World War II ==
During World War II Skënder Muço joined the ranks of Balli Kombëtar, one of the most important resistance organizations in Albania. At the end of November 1942, along with Hysni Lepenica, a former gendarmerie officer from Gjirokastër, he founded the first battalion of Balli Kombëtar in Vlorë named Shqiponja (English: Eagle). Muço also became head of Balli Kombëtar in the Vlorë region and a member of the organization's council. As commanders of Shqiponja Muço and Lepenica confronted many times the Italian and later Germans troops. One of the most important of those battles was the battle of Gjorm, in which Balli Kombëtar inflicted heavy losses on the Italian army.

In 1943 he was one of the representatives of Balli Kombëtar in the Mukje Agreement, a treaty of collaboration signed by Balli Kombëtar and the National Liberation Movement. Along with Musine Kokalari Muço founded the first social democratic party of Albania in 1943-4 as a faction of Balli Kombëtar. On 21 November 1943 he wrote and published a pamphlet labeling the German troops and their Albanian collaborators as the barbaric enemy. On 7 August 1944 he was ambushed and captured by German troops while going to Vlorë with two other Ballists, Yzeir Ismaili and Zako Mezi. He was executed three days later in Bubullimë, Lushnjë, western Albania.
