= Thoma Orologa =

Albanian politician

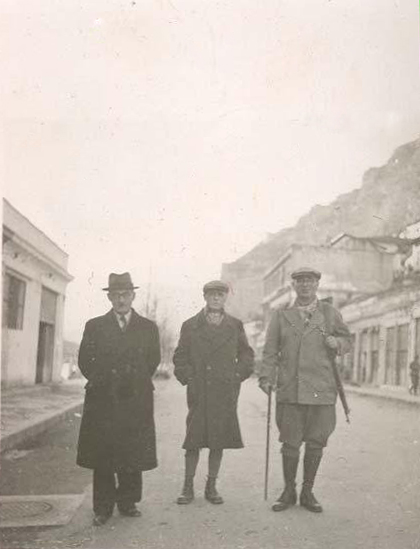
- Balli Kombëtar leaders Ali Këlcyra, Mid'hat Frashëri, Thoma Orologa (from left to right) in Berat

Minister of Justice of Albanian Kingdom
- In office 9 November 1936 – 3 June 1938

Member of Parliament of Albanian Kingdom (Deputy of Korçë)
- In office 1932–1939

Personal details
- Born: 1888 Korçë, Manastir Vilayet, Ottoman Empire (modern Albania)
- Died: 30 November 1947 (aged 58–59) Albania

Thoma Orologa (1888 – 30 November 1947) was an Albanian jurist, politician and a leader of the anti-communist resistance in Albania during World War II.

== Life ==
Born in 1888 in Korçë, in the Manastir Vilayet of the Ottoman Empire (present-day Albania) he studied law in Athens and Paris. After finishing his studies he returned to Korçë, where he worked as a lawyer and supported Kostaq Kota's efforts for independence of the area from French rule. In 1927 he became a member of the law reform committee of Albania and a professor of law at the school of law of Tirana.

In 1931 he became the president of the civil code reforms committee, while a year later he was elected deputy of Korçë in the Albanian parliament. During Kostaq Kota's second premiership he became minister of justice. After the Italian invasion of Albania and its occupation by fascist Italy in 1939, Orologa was among the few Albanian MPs who did not join the assembly that offered the Albanian crown to the Italian King, so he was detained in Porto Palermo Castle near Himara, and then transferred to Italy. In 1943, after he had been released by the Italians, he returned to Albania and joined the nationalist and anti-communist organization Balli Kombëtar and was elected a member of its central committee.

In 1943 he was a representative of Balli Kombëtar at the Mukje Agreement. In 1944 he became for the second time minister of justice of Albania in the first government after the German defeat. After the consolidation of power by the Party of Labour of Albania, he was accused because of his collaboration with axis forces and executed in September 1947.
