= Gjorm =

- Village
- Location within Albania
- Coordinates: 40°18′N 19°38′E
- Country: Albania
- County: Vlorë
- Municipality: Selenicë
- Administrative unit: Brataj
- Time zone: UTC+1 (CET)
  - Summer (DST): UTC+2 (CEST)

Gjorm is a village in Vlorë County, southwestern Albania. It was part of the former municipality Brataj. At the 2015 local government reform, it became part of the municipality Selenicë.

== World War II ==
During World War II, Gjorm was part of the battlefield of the battle of Gjorm, where Albanian resistance units defeated and routed the troops of the Kingdom of Italy.
