= Kurtez =

- Village
- Location within Albania
- Coordinates: 40°22′33″N 20°31′2″E
- Country: Albania
- County: Korçë
- Municipality: Kolonjë
- Administrative unit: Çlirim
- Time zone: UTC+1 (CET)
  - Summer (DST): UTC+2 (CEST)

Kurtez (also: Kurtes) is a community in the Korçë County, southeastern Albania. At the 2015 local government reform it became part of the municipality Kolonjë.

== History ==
The Kurtez ambush took place near the village in 1943.
