= Viktor Dosti =

Albanian human rights activist

- Born: 1925
- Died: 25 April 2005 (aged 80); Tirana, Albania

Viktor Dosti (1925–2005) was an Albanian political prisoner, human rights activist, and member of the Helsinki Committee for Human Rights.

== Biography ==
Dosti was the son of Hasan Dosti, a lawyer who briefly worked for the Albanian government under the Italian occupation in 1939. His father fled Albania at the end of the war to lead an anti-Communist movement in exile in the United States. The remainder of Hasan Dosti's family, his seven children, stayed in internal exile camps and prisons for the duration of the regime.

Dosti was 19 when he was first arrested, and he was 65 when he was released from the camp, with his wife and three children. He was married to Fatbardha Kupi, the daughter of Abaz Kupi, another exiled Albanian politician and strongman with family left in Albania, whom he met at the camp in Savër, near Lushnje in the central part of the country. Their three children were born in the camp.
