= Second Battle of Preševo =

Battle between the Yugoslav partisan and the Ballist forces

- Part of The Insurgency in Karadak–Gollak (1941–1951) and World War II in Yugoslavia
Date	9 – 15 November 1944
Location	Preševo valley, at the time Bulgaria, modern-day Serbia
Result	Yugoslav partisan victory
Territorial changes	Partisans capture Preševo and Gjilan

Belligerents
Balli Kombëtar	Yugoslav Partisans

Commanders and leaders
Ramiz Cërnica; Xheladin Kurbalia; Qazim Zekbasha; Jetë Rainca; Sulë Hotla	(Yugoslav Partisans) Abdullah Krašnica

Units involved
Karadak battalion	(Yugoslav Partisans) 2nd Kosovska Brigade (Yugoslav Partisans) 3rd Kosovska Brigade

Strength
700–1,000 men	Unknown

Casualties and losses
500–600 Civilians killed	Unknown

The Second Battle of Preševo was an armed clash between the Yugoslav partisan and the Ballist forces. The battle lasted for several days until the Ballist forces were finally defeated and forced to withdraw, and the Preševo valley soon returned into Partisan hands.

== Background ==
From September 18th to 24th, partisan forces attempted to take control of the Preševo Valley and the villages on the Skopska Crna Gora mountain near Kumanovo, which were then under the control of Balli Kombëtar. However, the Ballists, along with the German Heeresgruppe E, dealt the partisans a significant defeat, forcing them to withdraw from the area. Despite this setback, in early November, Abdullah Krašnica began preparing for a new offensive on Preševo.

== Battle ==
From November 9 to 15, 1944, the partisans launched an assault, engaging in battle and successfully forcing the Ballist forces to retreat into the broader Karadak Mountains. This allowed the partisans to capture the town and the surrounding region. This victory granted the partisans an unobstructed path to seize Gjilan. Tahir Zaimi of the Second League of Prizren wrote in his book that after the fall of Preševo, the "Bulgarians and Serbian-Macedonian Partisans" shot between 500 and 600 Albanians.
