= Free Albania National Committee =

Post-WWII political organization

"Free Albania" National Committee
- Komiteti Kombëtar "Shqipëria e Lirë"
- Abbreviation: FAC
- Predecessor: Balli Kombëtar; Legaliteti; Lidhja Agrare; Lidhja Katundare; Independent anti-Communist guerrillas
- Formation: 7 July 1949
- Dissolved: 1992
- Purpose: Overthrowing the Communist regime in Albania (1944-1992)
- Headquarters: Paris, New York City
- Services: Political engagement, subversion, intelligence support, financial support
- Chairman: Mithat Frashëri (initial); Hasan Dosti; Rexhep Krasniqi
- Board of directors: Abaz Kupi, Zef Pali, Said Bey Kryeziu, Nuçi Kotta
- Main organ: Shqipëria
- Affiliations: National Committee for a Free Europe

"Free Albania" National Committee (Albanian: Komiteti Kombëtar "Shqipëria e Lirë"), also known as "Free Albania" National-Democratic Committee, also National Committee for a Free Albania or NCFA, was a political organization of post-World War II Albanian emigres based in the Western countries. It was supported by the CIA as part of the Albanian Subversion and was a member of the National Committee for a Free Europe. The committee's aim was organizing the Albanian diaspora and cooperating with western powers in overthrowing Enver Hoxha's Communist regime in Albania.
The committee's creation was initiated in Rome and was completed in Paris in the summer of 1949.

== Background ==
With the triumph of communism in Albania after the end of World War II, many of the political actors in Albania during World War II had to flee the country. Many of them collaborated with western governments and their secret services in seeking to overthrow the communists, and thus changing the form of the regime in Albania. The members of the committee were heterogeneous. Most were former Balli Kombëtar (Albanian National Front) members including Mithat Frashëri, Abas Ermenji, Vasil Andoni, Hafëz Jusuf Azemi and Ali Klissura. There were also Legaliteti members including their leader Abaz Kupi, the "Blloku Independent" (Independent Block) of pro-Italian and/or collaborationist elements who had been involved with Albanian puppet governments during the war, (e.g. Ernest Koliqi, Mustafa Kruja, Gjon Marka Gjoni, Shefqet Verlaci) anti-fascist and anti-communist guerrillas (led by Said Bey Kryeziu) who cooperated with British-American emissaries during the war, other independent anti-communists, e.g. Muharrem Bajraktari, as well as other political factions including the "Peasant League" (Albanian: Lidhja Katundare).

== Creation ==
Preparations for the Committee started in Rome in 1948, at the initiative of Legaliteti. After the rejection of Balli Kombëtar (due to political antagonism against them in place since World War II), Balli's leader Mithat Frashëri took the initiative. However, strong confrontations took place between Balli members and "Blloku Independent" members who decided to stay out of the committee. The US State Department did not want any of the Blloku members involved in the committee due to their pro Italian/German stance during the war, but there was support for guerillas like Ismail Vërlaci of Gjon Markagjoni to join as unaffiliated individuals.

An office was opened in Paris on 1 July 1949. The "Free Albania" National Committee was officially constituted on 7 July (although some Albanian sources place it later in time, on 26 August 1949). Mithat Frashëri was its chairman, with other members of the Directing Board being: Nuçi Kotta (son of the Albanian former Prime Minister Kostaq Kotta), Abaz Kupi, Said Kryeziu, and Zef Pali. There was also a national committee consisting of Eqrem Telhai of the "Peasant League" (Albanian: Lidhja Katundare), Hysni Mulleti of the "Agrarian League" (Albanian: Lidhja Agrare), Muharrem Bajraktari from the "Independent Fighting Group" (Albanian: Grupi Luftëtar i Pavarur), Ihsan Toptani (independent), Gaqo Gogo, a pro-monarchist and former King Zog I's secretary, Myftar Spahiu and Gani Tafilaj from Legaliteti, with Halil Maçi, Vasil Andoni, and Abaz Ermenji from Balli Kombëtar. Gaqo Gogo served as Executive Secretary, while Abaz Kupi was appointed chairman of the military junta, with Ermenji and Kryeziu as his deputies.

On 6 September 1949, the committee announced its creation in a BBC radio transmission. In the following days, Mithat Frashëri organized a press conference, which created a conflict with pro-Yugoslavian British authorities, who opposed Frashëri's words which included "Kosovo", stating that he should speak about only those territories that were part of the Albanian state.

Soon after, the British intelligence officer Billy McLean together with Alan Hare and Harold Perkins flew to Alexandria, Egypt where they joined Julian Amery and Robert Low. They had a meeting with King Zog trying to persuade him to recognize the committee. The former King of Albania, Ahmet Zogu, opposed the committee even though his supporter Abaz Kupi was one of the founders, arguing that he was the only legitimate representative of Albania.

The committee published the biweekly journal Shqiperia (Albania) in Albanian.

== Post 1949 ==
The committee moved its base to New York City. After Frashëri's death on 3 October 1949, Hasan Dosti took over, but later Rexhep Krasniqi, a Kosovar Albanian became chairman with the support of Xhafer Deva who had settled in the USA. Abas Ermenji continued to work in France, where he published the journal "Qëndresa Shqiptare" (Albanian: Albanian Resistance).

The committee collaborated with the CIA in forming the Company 4000 military units, stationed in Hohenbrunn, Bavaria, West Germany in 1950. The "company" consisted of trained military units, supporting the Albanian Subversion, though it was never effective.

With Albania joining the UN in 1955, the committee's activities diminished over the years, but it continued to organize political gatherings, conferences and seminars. Over 15,000 Albanian refugees were resettled in the United States through its efforts. Krasniqi published the newspaper "The Free Albanian" (Albanian: Shqiptari i lirë) from November 1957 to 1970. The committee was one of the nine national representative bodies which were used by US State Department to create the Assembly of Captive European Nations (ACEN).

With the demise of communism in Eastern Europe, the board of directors of the NCFA decided that its functions would no longer be needed, and it was disbanded in 1992.

== CIA involvement ==
Recently (2013) CIA documents became public, which showed the CIA's sponsorship and deep involvement in the committee's creation and activities.

== See also ==
- Operation Valuable
