= Petros Orologas =

Greek journalist and newspaper publisher

Petros Orologas (Greek: Πέτρος Ωρολογάς, 1892–1958) was a Greek journalist and newspaper publisher. He was one of the most important personalities of the press in Thessaloniki during the period 1912-2012.

== Life ==
Orologas was born in Korçë, in the Manastir Vilayet of the Ottoman Empire (present-day southern Albania) . In 1920s he lived in Thessaloniki, Greece, where he became active as a journalist in the local press. From 1921 he was director of the newspaper Tαχυδρόμος Bορείου Eλλάδος (Messenger of Northern Greece), a post he retained together with his brother, Alexandros Orologas, until 1927. The specific newspaper was politically oriented against Venizelism. He also wrote as a columnist there.

In 1938 Orologas was involved in a literary dispute with the progressive authors and journalists of the magazine "Μακεδονικές Ημέρες" (Macedonian Times), defending a conservative approach in literature. Latter in 1939 he became one of the directors of the local newspaper "Απογευματινή" (Apogevmatini), where he also wrote several articles, especially critics signing under the pen name "Vradynos". He also wrote for several other newspapers published in Thessaloniki: "Μακεδονία" (Macedonia), "Εθνική" (National), "Φως" (Light) and "Νέοι Καιροί" (Modern Times).

== Legacy ==
Orologas has been characterized as the "most spiritual and courageous form of the journalistic world" of his time in Greece. His work included also critical essays related to the literary issues, while he also influenced contemporary Greek literary thought.
