= Castle of Gjon Boçari =

Castle in Tragjas, Albania

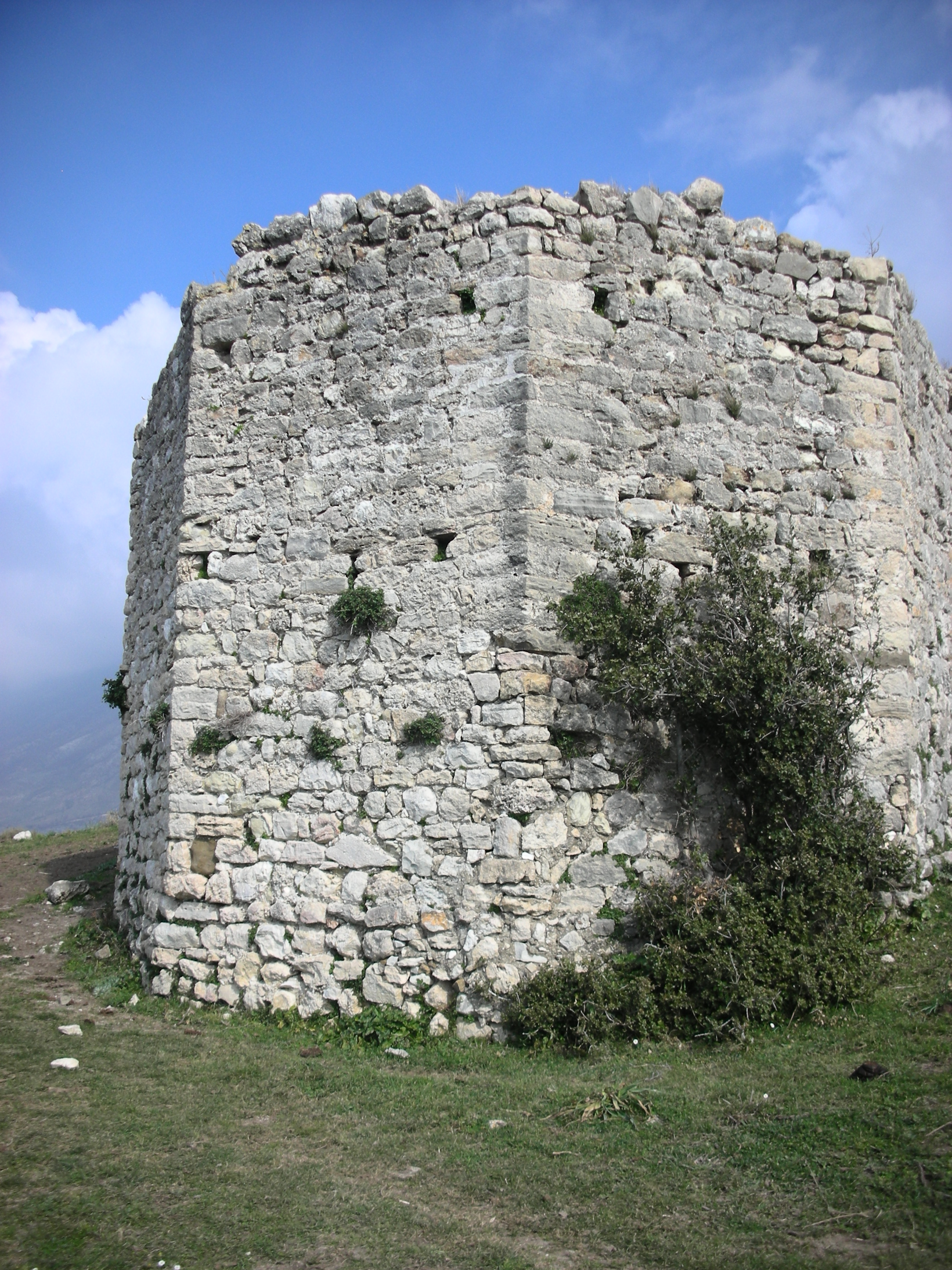
Defensive Tower, Castle of Gjon Boçari.

The Castle of Gjon Boçari (Albanian: Kalaja e Gjon Boçarit) is a castle of the 16th and 17th century built during Ottoman times in Tragjas, Albania.

== Architecture ==
The castle was built by the Boçari family, one of the principal Albanian families of Tragjas, Vlorë, southwestern Albania in the 16th and expanded in the 17th century. The fortification features arrowslits for artillery openings in the walls. The northern and eastern corners of the castle feature large towers. The stone walls form a rectangle surrounding the courtyard and have a width of 1.25 metres (4.1 ft) and a height of 5.5 metres (18 ft).
