= Gëzim Boçari =

Albanian politician and academic

Gëzim Boçari (born 25 March 1949) is an Albanian professor of pharmacology and a politician.

Gëzim Boçari is head of the pharmacology sector of the medicine faculty at the University of Tirana. He is one of the writers of medicine and pharmacology textbooks of Albanian universities. In the 2009 parliamentary elections for Albania he was the head candidate of the coalition of the Pole of Freedom (Albanian: Poli i Lirisë) in the district of Vlorë.
