= Hasan Dosti =

Albanian politician and jurist (1895-1991)

Minister of Justice
- In office December 12, 1941 – January 19, 1943

Personal details
- Born: 1895 Kardhiq, Ottoman Empire (now Kardhiq, Albania)
- Died: 29 January 1991 (aged 96) Los Angeles, California, U.S.
- Party: Balli Kombëtar
- Children: Victor Dosti
- Education: University of Paris
- Profession: Lawyer, politician

Hasan Dosti (1895 – January 29, 1991) was an Albanian jurist and politician. He was the leader of the Balli Kombëtar after the war and was considered by the communists to be one of Albania's greatest enemies.

== Biography ==
=== Early life ===
Hasan Dosti was born in Albania (then part of the Ottoman Empire) in the village of Kardhiq near Gjirokastra, to Elmaz Aga of the Dosti branch of Muslim Albanian Tosk household Dosti-Hajdaragaj. Back then the village was part of the Ottoman Empire and belonged to the Vilayet of Janina with majority Albanian population. He attended the schools in Filippiada and the Philosophy Zosimaia School in Ioannina. His family moved to Vlora after World War I, where Dosti met Avni Rustemi. Dosti then moved to Paris to complete his tertiary education at the faculty of law of the University of Paris. After graduating, he returned to Albania to work as a lawyer. In the 1920s he served a member of court of cassation of Albania under Thoma Orollogaj, who was the minister of justice at the time.

=== Opposition to monarchy ===
An opponent of Ahmet Zogu, he was imprisoned several times. From 1932 to 1935 he was sentenced to prison because of his participation in the Movement of Vlorë, an anti-monarchist organization founded by Dosti himself and Skënder Muço among others. In the late 1930s he organized an assassination plot against leading Italian and Albanian fascists.

=== Balli Kombëtar ===
In 1941 he initially became Minister of Justice in Mustafa Merlika-Kruja's cabinet under Italian occupation; however, in 1943 Dosti defected and joined the Balli Kombëtar.

=== Opposition in Exile ===
In 1944, after the takeover of power by the communists, he fled Albania, settling first in Italy and then towards the United States. By the late 1940s he had become one of the most important Albanian political leaders in exile. After the death of Mid'hat Frashëri in 1949, he emerges as one of the principal leaders of the National Committee for a Free Albania. Based on CIA Reports, in 1951 he was the President of the Agrarian Party, an anti-communist movement in exile advocating for parliamentary government and agrarian reform in Albania, in opposition to Enver Hoxha's regime.

=== Death ===
Hasan Dosti died at the age of 96. He had eight children, Luan, of Los Angeles, an aerospace engineer; and seven others who remained in Albania, including Shano Sokoli, Viktor Dosti, Tomorr Dosti, Ernest Dosti and Veronika Dine who spent their lives under Albania's Stalinist regime in labor camps and prisons.
