= Mukje Conference =

1943 treaty conference between the Balli Kombëtar and the National Liberation Movement

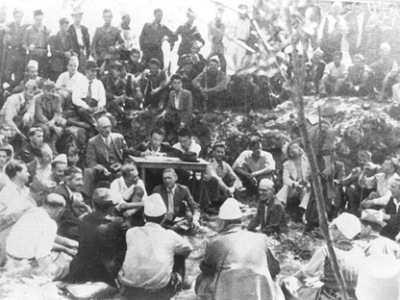
Communists and ballists converse during the Mukje agreement, August 2, 1943

The Mukje Conference was held on 1–3 August 1943 in Mukaj (near Krujë in North Albania). There was signed the Mukje agreement, a treaty between the nationalist Balli Kombëtar and the National Liberation Movement representatives. The aim was to generate a platform on how to regulate the Albanian resistance in World War II and how to prepare for the future of Ethnic Albanian state. The National Liberation Movement included the Communists and Legaliteti of Abaz Kupi, as well as smaller local nationalist leaders. The conference was intermediated by the British emissaries with the idea of unifying the Albanian political spectrum against the Fascists, similar to AVNOJ in Yugoslavia.

The agreement established a Committee of National Salvation to lead the Albanian resistance movement. The movement would take into consideration the Albanian national cause, making possible the creation of a Greater Albania, with the annexation of Albanian populated areas to a post-war Albanian state. On the part of the National Liberation Movement, the delegation was led by Ymer Dishnica, a member of the Politburo of the Central Committee of the Communist Party of Albania and Mustafa Gjinishi. Balli Kombëtar was represented by Skënder Muço, Hysni Lepenica, Mit’hat Frashëri, and Hasan Dosti (head of delegation) between others. A dispute arose concerning the status of Kosovo, with the National Front arguing it should be integrated into Albania, and the Communist representatives arguing against. The two sides agreed that the matter would be settled with a public vote. The agreement holds twelve signatures from each side.

Since the agreement included strong notes of nationalism with a potential of future border disputes which could jeopardize relations between Albania and Yugoslavia, the Communist Party of Yugoslavia viewed it as counterrevolutionary and formally denounced at a meeting of the Central Committee of the Communist Party of Albania the second Conference of the National Liberation Movement, both in Labinot. The agreement would be criticized as "a betrayal of the people and revolution" and "against the fundamental principles of the Conference of Pezë".

After failure of the agreement, Balli Kombëtar chose to openly collaborate with the Germans after the capitulation of Italy, while the Communist Party of Albania continued to fight alongside the Yugoslav Partisans. Legaliteti would continue fighting against the fascist armies, but the distance between them and the Communists would get larger and larger. The communists would consider them counterrevolutionary by the end of the war.

The communists' history in the following decades would criticize the agreement and its protagonists (including Dishnica and Gjinishi), and consider it a trap from the Balli side.

== Sources ==
- Vladimir Dedijer (1949). Jugoslovensko-albanski odnosi 1939-1948 (in Serbo-Croatian). Belgrade: Borba. pp. 86–91.
- Stavro Skendi (June 1948). "Albania within the Slav Orbit: Advent to Power of the Communist Party". Political Science Quarterly. 63 (2): 257–274. doi:10.2307/2144839. JSTOR 2144839.
