= Abas Ermenji =

Albanian politician, historian and nationalist

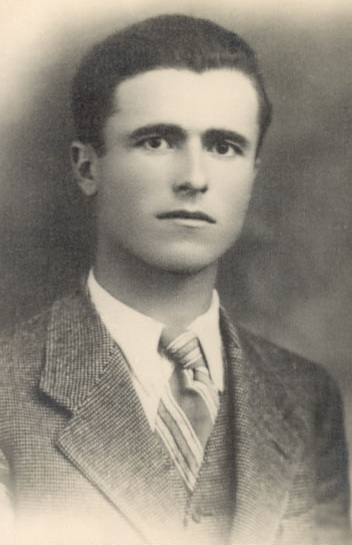
- Born: 12 December 1913; Skrapar, Albania
- Died: 13 March 2003 (aged 89); Paris, France
- Occupations: Historian, Politician
- Political party: Balli Kombëtar Albanian National Front Party

Abas Ermenji (12 December 1913 – 13 March 2003) was an Albanian politician, historian and nationalist fighter with agrarian socialist views who opposed the Albanian monarchy and communism.

== History ==
Ermenji was born in the village of Ermenj, Skrapar on 12 December 1913. He was educated in the Berat elementary and middle school. He attended high school in Shkodra. Between 1934 and 1938, Ermenji went to university at the Sorbonne, Paris and was a member of the Faculty of Literature with a specialization in History.

Ermenji returned to Albania in 1938 and was appointed professor at the Lycée of Korçë where he taught until November 1939. He was arrested on 28 November 1939 by the Italians as one of the organizers of a rally against the fascist occupation in Korça. He went into exile on the island of Ventotene.

In 1941, Ermenji returned to Albania and helped organise the National Front (Balli Kombëtar). He took part in organizing armed resistance against foreign occupation in the Skrapar-Berat area and managed to keep it free from the Italian forces.

After the success of the communist revolution in Albania, Ermenji was forced into exile by the new regime. He settled in Paris where he worked for the Democratic-National Committee "Free Albania", a political organization supported and funded by Western countries where he worked with other nationalists and collaborationists towards the efforts to free Albania from Hoxha's regime. The organization was not successful as a result of multiple conflicts between members of the committee, including opposing views between pro-Italian/German collaborationists and anti-fascist nationalists, regardless of the many attempts to organize a military takeover of Albania.

Abas Ermenji was a staunch defender of Albanians in Yugoslavia and Greece. He published many articles to bring awareness of the issues Albanians faced under foreign rule.

== Return to Albania and politics ==
After recreating the National Front in Albania in 1991, Ermenji was elected leader of the new National Front between 1994 and 1998. During this period and despite his old age, Ermenji made a major contribution to the establishment of Albanian national sentiment through a series of conferences across the entire country. In the problematic 1996 elections, he contested the results and boycotted the new parliament even though his party made gains through their pre-electoral alliance with the governing Democratic party. In a speech he denounced the elections as stolen and called the then president Sali Berisha a Diktator Qesharak (Roughly in English: "Ridiculous Dictator"). However, he stated that he had rethought about his past differences with Berisha by citing that he had changed his views on Berisha. In 2001 as leader of the Balli Kombëtar, he formed a coalition agreement with Sali Berisha during the 2001 Albanian parliamentary election. Abas Ermenji died at the age of 89. On the 6th anniversary of his death, Ermenji's monograph Vendi që zë Skënderbeu në Historinë e Shqipërisë - Skanderbeg’s Place in the History of Albania was published.
