= Ali Këlcyra =

Albanian politician and co-founder of the Balli Kombëtar (1891-1963)

Ali Këlcyra Bey
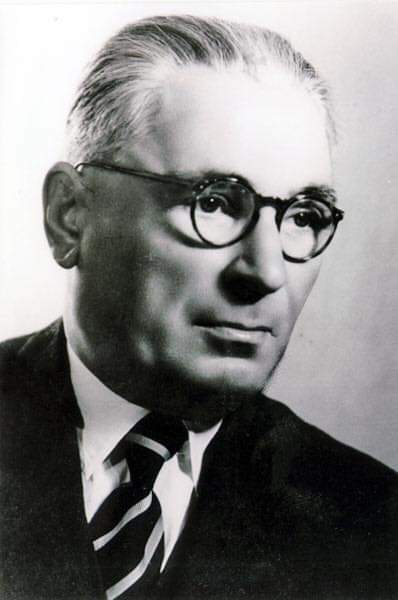

Founder of the Balli Kombëtar

Personal details
- Born: May 28, 1891 Këlcyrë, (today Albania), Ottoman Empire
- Died: September 24, 1963 (aged 72) Bari, Italy
- Party: Balli Kombëtar
- Education: La Sapienza University
- Occupation: Revolutionary, Politician
- Profession: Jurist

Ali Bey Këlcyra (May 28, 1891 – September 24, 1963) born Ali Klissura, was an Albanian lord and a member of the Albanian parliament in the 1920s. He was co-founder with Mid'hat Frashëri of the Balli Kombëtar organization in 1942, and the cosigner of the Dalmazzo-Këlcyra agreement with Lorenzo Dalmazzo.

== Biography ==
=== Early life ===
Këlcyra was born in Këlcyrë on 28 May 1891, to Xhemal bey Klissura and Hana Luarasi. He went to grammar school in Këlcyrë and then graduated from the Galatasaray High School in Istanbul, Turkey (then Ottoman Empire). He then studied political and administrative sciences at the Mülkiye school in Istanbul.

After the beginning of World War I he returned to Këlcyrë. During the Greek Invasion of Albania in 1914 he went to Vlorë along with other emigrants. He met there with Prince Von Wied and the princess Sophie who had come to visit the emigrants. He left the country to go to San Demetrio Corone, an Arbëreshë settlement in Calabria, Italy.

=== Period in Italy ===
In 1915 he enrolled at the Faculty of Jurisprudence at La Sapienza University in Rome. While in Rome, he was exposed to social democratic ideas and began to embrace them. He graduated in 1919 and returned to Albania one year later along with Themistokli Gërmenji and others to join the Albanian guerrilla movement to fight for Albanian freedom in World War I.

=== Return to Albania ===
In 1920 he went to Vlorë and participated in the creation of the “National Defense” organization. The organization had decided to fight the Italian invaders that were holding Albanian territories under the secret Treaty of London. As a result, the Italian Command under Settimo Piacentini expelled him from the Italian-held territories.

Këlcyra participated in the Congress of Lushnje, and was elected a member of the Albanian Parliament as a deputy of Gjirokastër.

=== Exile ===
During his stay in Paris, Ali Këlcyra wrote in Le Quotidien and Le Matin reporting on the situation in Albania and on the pro-fascist politics of Ahmet Zogu.

=== Second World War ===
In 1942 he returned to Albania and, along with Mit'hat Frashëri, co-founded the Balli Kombëtar organization.
