= Mid'hat Frashëri =

Albanian diplomat and poet (1880–1949)

Mid'hat Frashëri Bey
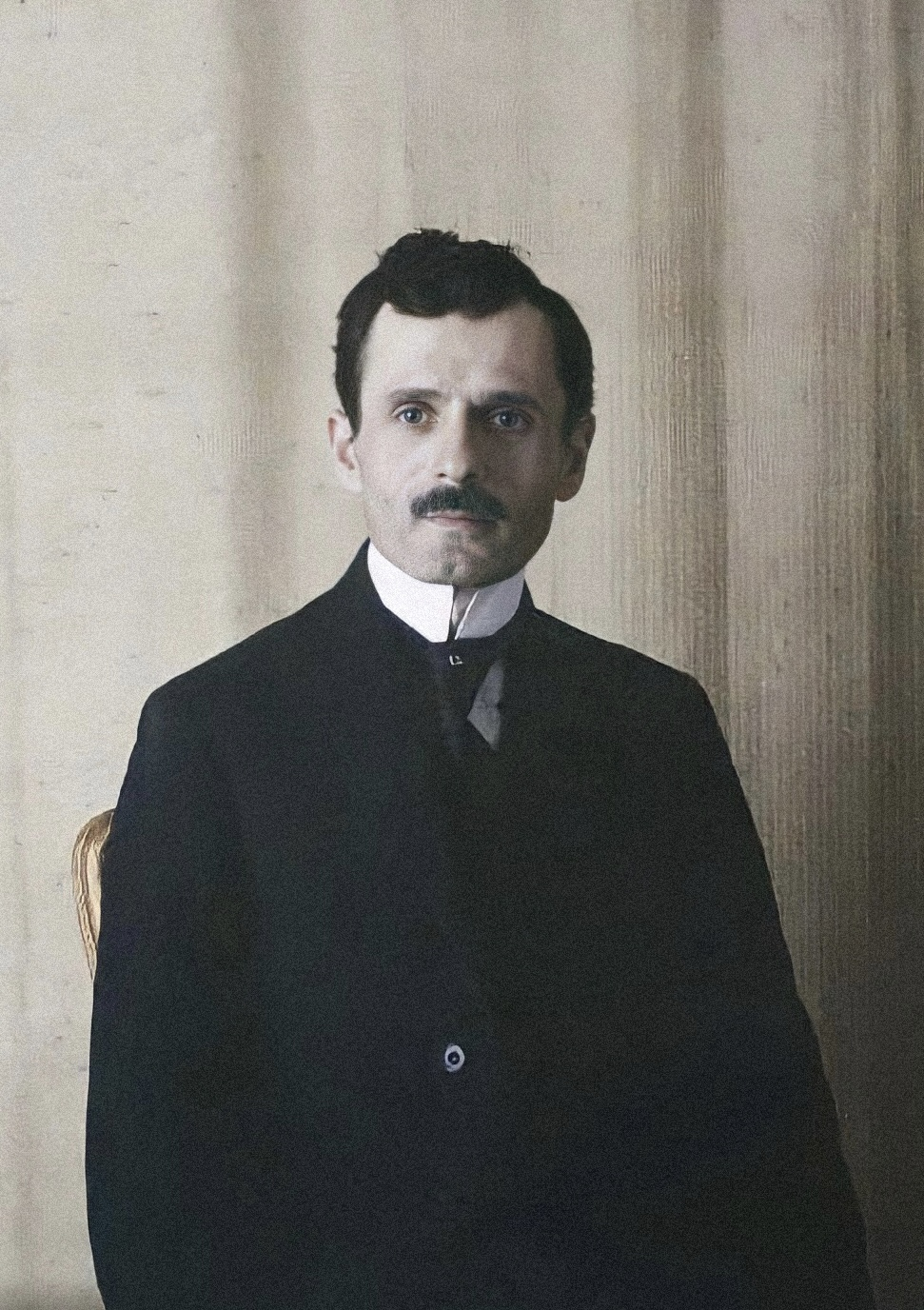
- Portrait of Mid'hat Frashëri in Paris

Founder of Balli Kombëtar

Personal details
- Born: 25 March 1880 Yanya, Yanya Vilayet, Ottoman Empire (now Ioannina, Greece)
- Died: 3 October 1949 (aged 69) New York City, New York, U.S.
- Cause of death: Heart attack
- Resting place: Ferncliff Cemetery, New York (reburied in Grand Park of Tirana)
- Party: Balli Kombëtar (1942-1945) Freedom and Accord Party(1911-1919)
- Relations: Abdyl Frashëri (Father); Naim Frashëri (Uncle); Sami Frashëri (Uncle); Mehdi Frashëri (Cousin); Ali Sami Yen (Cousin)
- Occupation: Pharmacist
- Awards: Order of Freedom (Kosovo)

Mid'hat Bey Frashëri (also known by his pen name as Lumo Skëndo; Turkish: Fraşerli Mithat Bey; 25 March 1880 – 3 October 1949) was an Albanian diplomat, writer and politician. Born as the son of Abdyl Frashëri, one of the most important activists of the Albanian National Awakening, he participated in the Congress of Manastir in 1908. In 1942, he became the president of Balli Kombëtar (National Front), an Albanian nationalist, collaborationist and anti-communist movement during the Second World War. Frashëri is referred to as one of the fathers of modern Albanian nationalism.

== Biography ==
=== Early life ===
Mid'hat bey Frashëri was the son of prominent Albanian politician and statesman from 19th century Abdyl Frashëri (who initiated the movement of a wide autonomy from Ottoman Empire) and nephew of the poets and nationalists Naim Frashëri and Sami Frashëri. He was born in Yanina in the Ottoman Empire (present day Ioannina, Greece) in 1880 and was raised in Istanbul, where his family worked in the Ottoman administration and organised the Albanian nationalist movement. In 1897 Mid'hat Frashëri was arrested by Ottoman authorities for having a copy of the newspaper Albania, and was released after intervention by his uncle Sami Frashëri. During 1901, Mid'hat Frashëri published a biography on his uncle Naim Frashëri. Giving up his studies of pharmacology, he worked for the Ottoman administration in the vilayet of Salonika from 1905 to 1910. Frashëri published a yearly almanac Kalendari Kombiar (National Calendar) that was printed in Sofia and distributed in the Balkans from there. The publication held moderate positions were Frashëri advocated for national unity, development of Albanian education, schools and literature and opposed foreign power intervention in Albanian affairs. Frashëri also called for government reforms and an alliance with Macedonians to achieve those aims, but he was against armed resistance. Regarding the Albanian question and geopolitics, Frashëri was known in Albanian circles of the time to be anti-Austro-Hungarian and anti-Italian.

Using the pen name Lumo Skendo, he began publishing the weekly newspaper "Lirija" in Salonika, which lasted until 1910. While running Lirija, Midhat wrote an open letter to Ismail Qemali, expressing his strong disapproval of Qemali's policy of friendship with Greece. In “The Epirus Question”, published originally in French, Mid’hat Frashëri vents his anti-Greek passions in denouncing the ravaging and destruction of much of southern Albania by Greek military and paramilitary forces, a calamity that he seems to have experienced at first hand.

He participated in the Congress of Monastir in 1908, and in January of the next year, he began editing a monthly magazine entitled "Diturija", a magazine based on the cultural, literary and scholarly interest of Albania. In 1908, the Albanian club dealing with cultural and political issues was founded in Salonika and Frashëri was voted by 400 Albanian delegates as its president. Frashëri favoured the Salonika club being the headquarters of the Bashkimi (Union) Society however other Albanian clubs concerned about Young Turk influence in the city rejected that view and instead opted for the Monastir club. Ottoman authorities forbid writing in Albanian that resulted in publications being published abroad and like other writers of the time Frashëri used a pseudonym Mali Kokojka to bypass those restrictions for his works. By late 1911, Frashëri had joined the Freedom and Accord Party which was founded by him and ten others who were opponents of the Young Turks and advocated for Ottomanism, government decentralisation and the rights of ethnic minorities.

=== Congress of Monastir ===
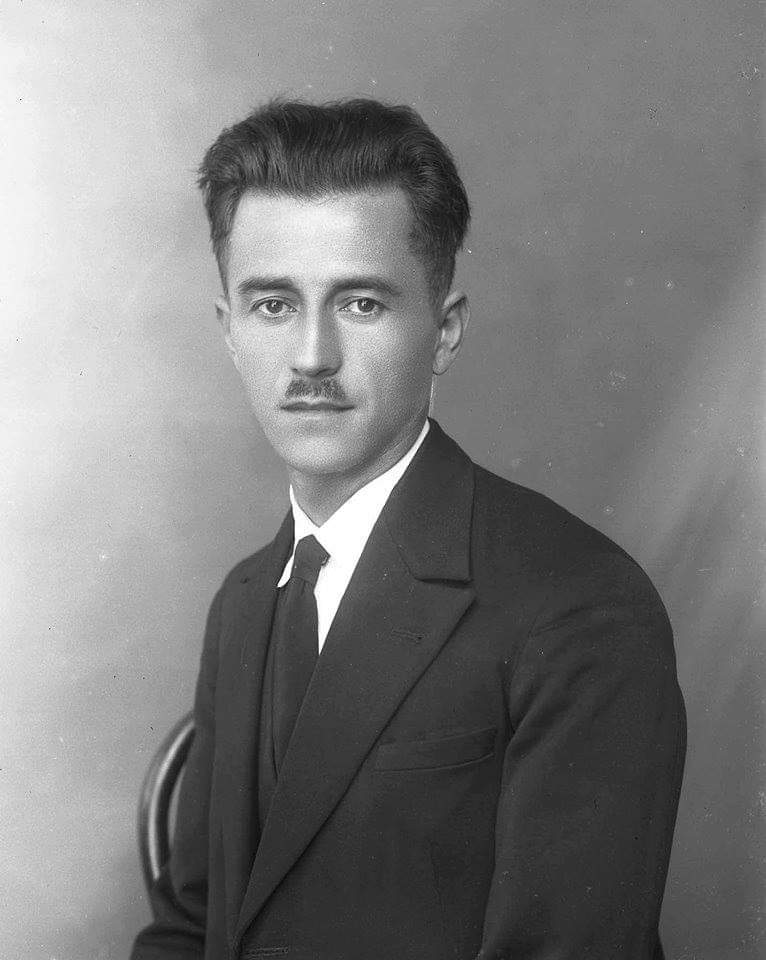
Mid'hat Frashëri in the 1910s

According to Mid'hat Frashëri, the foundation of knowledge and citizenship was the Albanian language. The struggle for language is another form of struggle for survival. For this existential reason, he presided over the Congress of Monastir. Mid'hat Frashëri was one of the fifty delegates that who helped form the modern Albanian alphabet. He became vice-chairman of the commission. Frashëri was also elected chairman of the congress which was responsible for the organization of the various alphabet proposals along with Parashqevi Qiriazi who was chairwoman of the commission of the alphabet. During the alphabet congress Frashëri supported the adoption of the Latin character Istanbul alphabet for writing the Albanian language.

=== Albanian Declaration of Independence ===
Mid'hat bey's political views took on a nationalist character during the Balkan Wars and in the final collapse of the Ottoman Empire when Albania was on the verge of being carved up by its Balkan neighbours. Unlike some of his cousins who remained in what later became Turkey, Frashëri moved to Albania after the collapse of the Ottoman Empire. Mid'hat Frashëri was one of the eighty-three leaders meeting in Vlorë in November 1912. He was one of the signers of the declaration of independence and became the Minister of Public Works in the Provisional Government of Albania.

Mid'hat did not stay in this role for long as Ismail Qemali invited all Albanian officers and militias who were on different fronts in the Balkan War to return to their homes. Mid'hat was against the order from the Prime Minister and went twice from Vlora to Ioannina to encourage the Albanian reservists to continue the war until the end, thinking that this could bring Çameria to be a part of Albania. Mid'hat could not do this as a Minister of the Albanian government, but as an individual and caused a further rift between himself and Ismail Qemali. On March 30, 1913, Mid'hat resigned from office due to indignation against the attitude of the prime minister (Ismail Qemali) towards the siege of Ioannina.

After resigning from Public office, Mid'hat began writing for newspaper "Përlindj' e Shqipënia". Under the Përmeti I Government and the arrival of Prince Wilhem zu Wied, a Peasant Revolt emerged. Mid'hat published articles condemning Essad Pasha Toptani, writing "Essadism took shape and form under an apocalyptic trinity: Essad Toptani, mufti Musa Qazimi and Haxhi Qamili, three heads of grace who represented ambition, betrayal and greed".

He later became the Albanian consul general in Belgrade and postmaster general. At the beginning of World War I, Mid'hat was interned in Romania for a time, but after he was released, he returned to publishing. Mid'hat resided in Lausanne for a time with his cousin Mehdi Frashëri, where he was author of a number of newspaper articles and essays. On 25 November 1920, he was appointed chairman of the Albanian delegation to the Paris Peace Conference, where he remained until 1922. In Paris, he continued his journalistic activities in the French press to publicize Albania's position in the postwar restructuring of Europe. The frontiers of the Principality of Albania had not been set during the Paris Peace Conference in 1919, as they were left for the League to decide. Mid'hat, as the chairman of the Albanian delegation in the League of Nations, successfully countered Slobodan Jovanović, the Yugoslav delegate, on the legitimacy of an Albanian state. Jovanovic made accusations that the 'Tirana government' was a tool of 'muslim landowners' and did not represent all Albanians, using the de facto Mirdita Republic as an example. Mit'hat argued that the Tirana government was not a Mohammedan government and its cabinet consists of representatives from all Albanian religions.

A renewed appeal, made by Mid'hat Frasheri, President of the Albanian Delegation, on April 29, 1921, after dilating upon the trouble with Yugoslavia, called attention to the difficulties with Greece. This latter state, it was asserted, continued ‘to occupy a district containing twenty Albanian villages east of Korçë, pending a decision of the Great Powers with regard to its evacuation.’ Frasheri and Bishop Fan Noli countered the Greek opposition, Frangoulis, arguing that the frontiers of Albania were those established at London and Florence in 1913, since the ‘treaties’ then made had not been abrogated. It was pointed out that the government was in possession of the territory defined in 1913, with the exception of an area encircling the district of Korçë, which was occupied by Greek troops after the withdrawal of the French troops in May, 1920.

He subsequently held other ministerial posts and In January 1923, he began his duties as Albanian ambassador to Greece. He performed this duty until December 1925. According to Mehdi Frashër, In 1924-1925 Mid'hat was the representative of Albania in Athens to observe the conditions of Albanians in Çameria. He was involved in the protests against the violent migration of the Cham population to Turkey. In December 1925, he resigned from this position due to Ahmet Zog (then President of Albania) signing of the agreement by which Saint Naum and Vermosh were given to Yugoslavia.

=== Quiet period ===
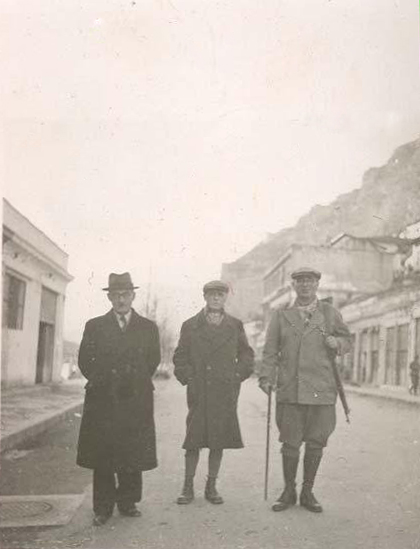
Balli Kombëtar leaders Ali Këlcyra, Mid'hat Frashëri, Thoma Orollogaj (from left to right) in Berat.

Under the Zog regime in 1925, Mid'hat left public life and opened up the Lumo Skëndo Bookstore in Tirana, and also worked as a pharmacist. He himself possessed an exceptionally large private library of some 20,000 volumes, the largest collection in the country at the time. In February 1938, he offered his collection to the Institute of Albanian Studies. Ahmet Zogu, now King Zog, offered Mid'hat a role in his government cabinet but refused, believing it would dishonour his family name to be a part of Zogu's government.

With the rise of Germany and World War II looking inevitable, Mid'hat began forming Balli Kombëtar (the National Front) to use in the war to create Ethnic Albania.

=== Balli Kombëtar ===
He was the leader of the Balli Kombëtar nationalist movement during the Second World War. Balli Kombëtar was a political organization that mainly fought for an Ethnic Albania and fought communist groups in alliance with the German occupation forces.

During 1944 he joined the German Forces as an ally and fought the anti-Nazi guerrilla groups. His cousin, Mehdi Frashëri, served as Albanian Prime Minister under a German-backed Albanian Government.

==== Proposed Greco-Albanian federation ====
In May 1944 Mid'hat sent a letter to Dhimitër Fallo. In the letter, Mid'hat told Fallo to travel to Greece in order to negotiate with Greek nationalists, including the Greek collaborationist government, the Greek government-in-exile and the EDES of Napoleon Zervas, and to formally ask for the creation of a Greek-Albanian federation after the end of the War. The main points of the letter were:

- The creation of a Greco-Albanian federation after the end of the War, with Greece having the leading role.
- The connecting link will be the independence and full sovereignty of both sides.
- The Greek-Albanian borders remain those of 1939 and an official declaration will be made.
- They undertake the implementation of a defensive and offensive alliance as well as the development of military ties.
- Conclusion of financial agreements between the two parties.
- Efforts to ensure that this connection is made as soon as possible, as well as improvement of Greek-Turkish-Albanian relations.
- In the event of war, general military command will be handed over to Greece. The Albanian Army would be placed under the Greek Army General Staff.

The Greek side, under the Greek collaborationist minister Athanasios Chrysochoou, who simultaneously maintained contacts with the Greek government-in-exile, proposed that, under this agreement, Northern Epirus should also be ceded to Greece, a condition which the Balli Kombëtar under Mid'hat accepted. However, Legaliteti reluctance caused the discussions to stall, ultimately failing to produce an agreement between the two sides.

Because of these seemingly pro-Greek sentiments of Midh'at, Albanian communist leader Muharrem Xhafa called him an "arch-traitor" for collaborating with Greek nationalists.

=== After World War II and death ===
In 1945, the communists won the war in Albania. Mid'hat escaped the communists by fleeing to southern Italy. The early years of the Cold War found Mid'hat Frashëri in the West trying to patch together a coalition of anti-communist opposition forces in Britain and the United States. In August 1949, he was elected as head of a "Free Albania" National Committee. He died of a heart attack at the Lexington Hotel on Lexington Avenue in New York and was buried in Ferncliff Cemetery in New York. At his funeral ceremony, fellow anti-communists Sejfi Protopapa and Father Paul Rado delivered the speech. Imam Vehbi Ismaili, who came from Detroit, made the religious prayers of exhortation. The coffin with Mid'hat Frashëri's body was covered with the National Flag and was honoured by nearly 200 people.

His remains were reburied in the Grand Park of Tirana in November 2018, alongside the tombs of his father and uncles, Abdyl Frashëri, Naim Frashëri and Sami Frashëri.

== Legacy ==
Mid'hat Frashëri was a man of short stature with a speech impediment. He was described by an Italian journalist as a man who dressed very properly with very clean white cuffs and very white hair. He was a beloved leader and also a bibliophile. His library, one of the finest in the Balkans, became the basis for the Albanian National Library. Frashëri's entire library of some 20,000 volumes, the largest in Albania at that time, was confiscated by the new regime. The library included significant albanological works inherited from Franz Nopcsa von Felsö-Szilvás.

=== Nation building ===
Mid'hat's political legacy is often contrasted with that of Ismail Qemali. While both were prominent architects of Albanian independence, they represented differing approaches to nation-building; Qemali prioritised diplomatic recognition and the consolidation of the Albanian state, whereas Frashëri advocated a more uncompromising nationalist vision focused on the defense and unification of Albanian-inhabited territories. Historians have cited this contrast as reflecting two enduring traditions within Albanian political thought.

=== Opinions ===
Mid'hat was viewed by many as a staunch patriot who helped create the modern Albanian alphabet and founded the country’s Institute of Albanology. His nationalist ideology, from advocating for the Albanian Vilayet to forming "Ethnic Albania" through the Balli Kombëtar has caused controversy. The repatriation and reburial of the remains of Mid'hat Frashëri to Tirana was met with varying opinions within Albania, particularly those with some form of connection to the Communist Party of Albania.

Uran Butka, one of the founding members of the National Association of Political Prisoners, says that "Midhat Frashëri passionately defended Kosovo against the ruling policies of the neighboring states. Even when he was ambassador of Albania in Greece, he defended the Çam issue, facing the anti-Albanian policies of displacement and depopulation of Albanians".

Odise Porodini, a member of a Communist veterans’ group, was critical of the official tributes paid to Frasheri. He stated that Mid'hat was against his country with his political activity and he doesn’t deserve a state ceremony. Muharrem Xhafa, a former official of the Albanian Communist Party labelled Mid'hat Frashëri a "pseudo-patriot" and "traitor" who wanted to exterminate LANÇ. Although Frashëri was one of the signers of the Albanian Declaration of Independence in 1912, the Albanian Communists, after taking over in 1945, deleted his name from the official documents in an attempt to remove historical evidence of his contribution to Albania.

On 22 December 2022, The grave and the memorial of Mithat Frasheri, was heavily damaged by unknown attackers in what seems to be a hate attack.

== Quotes ==
When Albania declared independence from the Ottoman Empire:

"Until now the Albanians have lived very little for themselves; their activity, their blood, their talents have profited their neighbors. They have consecrated their best for the good of others. Now they must live and work for themselves, for their Albania."

"Albanians, although mostly Muslims, have never considered themselves Turks. On the contrary, they had a clear notion of their own individuality, and a deep gulf prevented them from mixing with the race of the conquerors."

On the Epirus Question:

"For whom was Greece, in the person of Zographos, demanding privileges? Who were the Greeks of Epirus? We have already stated, and can do so again here that “there is not a single Greek within the borders of Albania” as defined by the Powers at the conference in Florence. Those whom Greece called Greeks are none other than Albanian Orthodox Christians."

In regards to the Albanian character:

"Albanians will win all conflicts, after finishing the last conflict among themselves."

In regards to Albanian Communists:

"Communism is a terrible disease, like the rabies of dogs and wolves, it is a cholera that destroys not only the body, but even more, the heart and soul of man."

To summarize the ideals of the National Front:

"What should be our ideal? It should be the greatness and honor of the Albanian, the unity and unity of the nation, happiness and general progress."
