= National Liberation Movement (Albania) =

Albanian communist resistance organization during World War II

National Anti-Fascist Liberation Movement
- Lëvizja Antifashiste Nacionale Çlirimtare
- Leaders: Enver Hoxha; Mehmet Shehu; Myslym Peza; Haxhi Lleshi; Spiro Moisiu; Baba Faja Martaneshi
- Dates active: 1942–1945
- Allegiance: Communist Party of Albania
- Headquarters: Pezë
- Active regions: Axis-occupied Albania
- Ideology: Communism; Marxism–Leninism; Anti-fascism; Republicanism; Stalinism; Internationalism; Left-wing nationalism Albanian nationalism
- Political position: Far-left
- Size: Over 40,000
- Wars: the Albanian resistance during World War II

The National Liberation Movement (Albanian: Lëvizja Nacional-Çlirimtare; or Lëvizja Antifashiste Nacional-Çlirimtare (LANÇ)), also translated as National Liberation Front, was an Albanian communist resistance organization that fought in World War II. It was created on 16 September 1942, in a conference held in Pezë, a village near Tirana, and was led by Enver Hoxha. Apart from the figures which had the majority in the General Council it also included known nationalists like Myslim Peza although the Partisans under Yugoslav influence ended up executing numerous Albanian nationalist figures. In May 1944, the Albanian National Liberation Front was transformed into the government of Albania and its leaders became government members, and in August 1945, it was replaced by the Democratic Front.

The National Liberation Army (Ushtria Nacional-Çlirimtare) was the army created by the National Liberation Movement.

== Background ==
=== Italian invasion ===
Albania did not put up an organized resistance to the Italian invasion (April 7–12, 1939). However different Albanian groups of patriots such as Mujo Ulqinaku and Abaz Kupi made a brief resistance to the invasion force in Durrës on the day of invasion. Durrës was captured on April 7, Tirana the following day, Shkodër and Gjirokastër on April 9, and almost the entire country by April 10.

=== Initial resistance groups ===
At the time of the Italian invasion, the Shkodër communist group included Qemal Stafa, a student, Vasil Shanto, an artisan, Liri Gega, an intellectual, Imer Dishnica, a doctor, Zef Mala and others. The leaders were Mala, Shanto, Stafa and Kristo Themelko. The Shkodër group's activities also spanned over Kosovo and western Macedonia, and the organization included several emigrants from Gjakova and other places in Kosovo, who had moved to Albania between 1930 and 1937. In spring 1941, Shanto and Stafa met with fellow Communist Fadil Hoxha due to his earlier contact with Yugoslav communist Miladin Popović. Miladin Popović and Dušan Mugoša were the Yugoslav delegates that helped unite the Albanian communist groups in 1941.

After the Italian invasion, there was no general resistance to the Italian army, although some local leaders like Myslim Peza, Baba Faja Martaneshi, Abaz Kupi etc. created small çetas (small detachments) which from time to time undertook small attacks on Italian forces. Meanwhile, the communist activity in Albania increased and culminated with the creation on 8 November 1941 of the Albanian Communist Party.

=== Establishment of the Communist Party and first detachments ===
Following the German attack on Russia, Yugoslav leader Josip Broz Tito under Comintern directives sent two Yugoslav delegates Miladin Popović and Dušan Mugoša to Albania. These two helped unite the Albanian communist groups in 1941. In August 1941, the Albanian Communist Party was established through the agreement between the Shkodër (led by Shanto and Stafa), Korçë and Tirana (led by Enver Hoxha) communist groups. After intensive work, the Albanian Communist Party was officially formed on November 8, 1941, by a unanimous vote of all members and in place of a leadership a Central Committee was elected instead. Members of the Central Committee were Enver Hoxha, Qemal Stafa, Ramadan Çitaku, Koçi Xoxe, Tuk Jakova, Kristo Themelko and Gjin Marku. The creation of the Central Committee was followed by the creation of regional committees, the responsibility of which was to implement the decisions made by the Central Committee.

Starting from December 1941 the communist party began to create small groups of resistance made up of 5-10 people called guerilla units. These detachments began to engage in various acts of sabotage against the Italian forces. They also started to disseminate antifascist propaganda in order to gain the attention and the support of the civilians.

As of 1942 the local press and the foreign consulates began to report an increasing number of attacks. The most spectacular act of sabotage was the interruption of all telegraphic and telephone communications in Albania in June and July 1942. Although the communist activity was increasing, the main concern for Italians were the northern bands. The Italians had given up on governing Northern Albania. The security posts composed of gendarmes in Southern Albania were mostly concerned for their own security and rarely ventured themselves outside their posts, and convoys along the roads were to be accompanied by strong Italian military detachments.

== Conference of Pezë ==
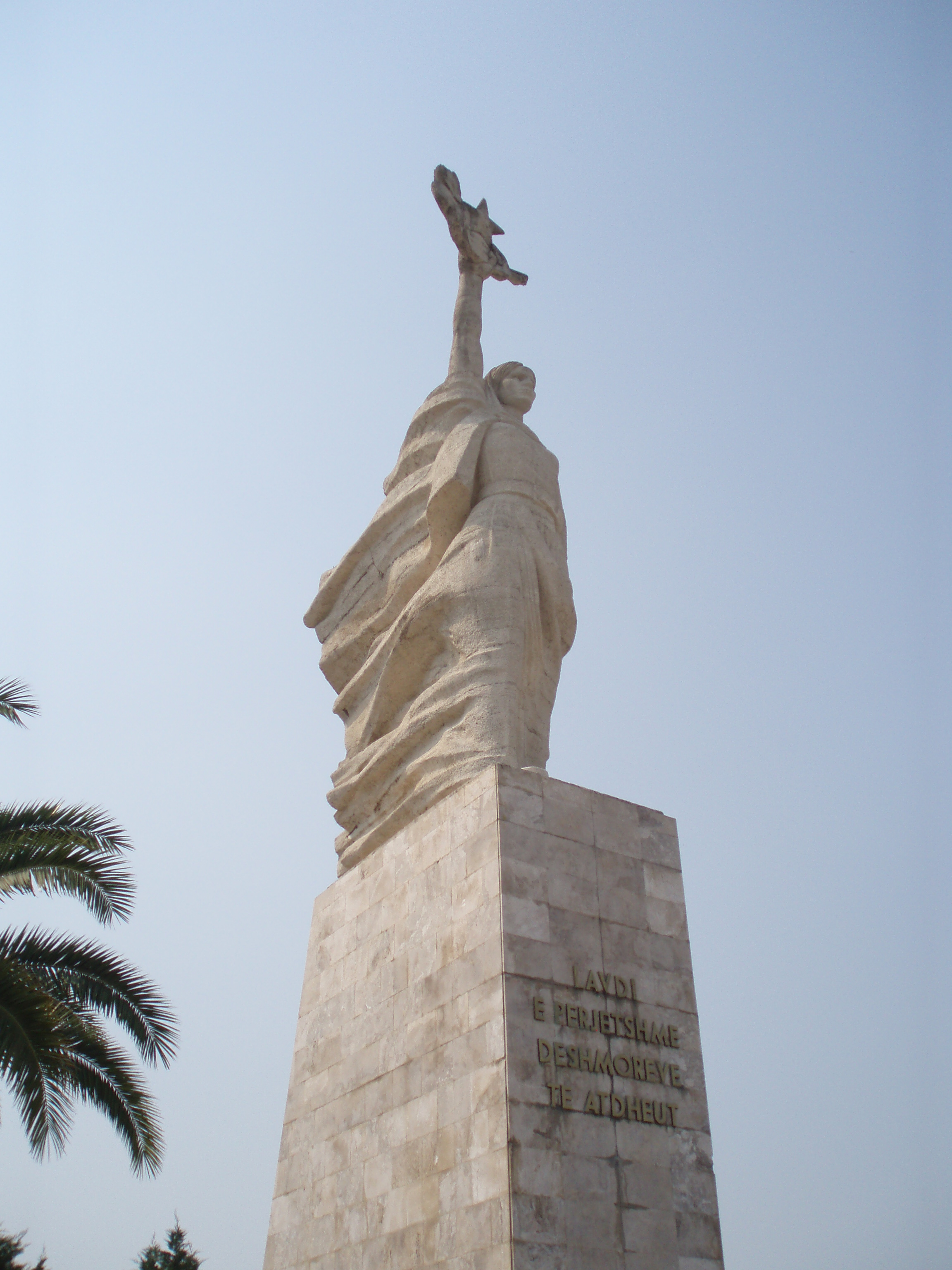
Mother Albania. The partisan monument and graveyard on the outskirts of Tirana, Albania

It was at this time (September 1942) that the Albanian Communist Party made their bold move of calling up a national conference, the Conference of Peza, which took place on 16 September 1942 in the house of Myslim Peza, a known resistance leader, in Pezë village, near Tirana. In the conference the Communist Party of Albania invited all the Albanian resistance leaders to create a national resistance front. The Communist Party saw the creation of this front as a necessity for Albania. Its intention was to dominate this front, although some figures within the Albanian Communist Party opposed the idea of an organised front with other nationalists, fearing their possible betrayal.

The conference decided to create the General Council which was composed of 10 people: seven communists including Mustafa Gjinishi, Enver Hoxha, and known nationalists like Abaz Kupi, Myslim Peza and Baba Faja Martaneshi. Mehdi Frashëri was the honorary president of the conference, a fact suppressed later by the communist history.

The General Council would supervise local liberation councils. The councils in areas yet to be liberated would function as propaganda agencies, would collect material necessary for the war, conduct espionage, organize the economic struggle against Italian companies, and sabotage the collection of agricultural products by the fascists. In already liberated areas, they were to function as new state. They were to maintain law and order developing local economy; overseeing food supply, trade, education, culture, and press. They would also settle blood feuds, and maintain readiness for war.

The conference managed to set in place a joint National Liberation Movement with a provisional eight-member council, with Enver Hoxha and Abaz Kupi among them, though it was dominated by the communists.

== Communist control over partisans ==
Partisan fighters were organized into 20 to 70-men units, equivalent to a platoon, including a communist commissar, who acted as the political officer. The commander, the political commissar and their deputies constituted the unit command, and all military decisions were made and agreed upon by all members of the command. Every partisan unit, no matter how large or small, had a command of four individuals. The role of the commissar was, among others, to guarantee that the activities of the partisan unit would comply with the directives of the Communist Party. Other duties of the commissar included keeping the partisans up to date with the latest political developments, serve as the official representatives of the National Liberation Front in dealings with national liberation councils and civilians, and as leader of the communist members of the partisan unit.

The Communist Party oriented the activities of the National Liberation Army through its various organizations inside the army. Each partisan unit had a political organization called the communist cell and both the communist cell and the commissar were responsible to regional committees of the Communist Party. Miladin Popović, a Yugoslav communist, attended the Peza Conference as an adviser and hoped to further strengthen party controls by creating a general staff that would tie the various units together, but his suggestion was not adopted. The partisan units were supplemented by territorial units - irregular self-defense detachments made up of volunteers. They were planned for every larger village or one for two-to-three villages together. Their function was to protect the liberated zones and to serve as a source of replenishment for the regular partisan units. At the end of 1942 there were 2000 partisans plus a larger number of territorial units.

== Mukje Agreement ==
The Mukje Agreement was a treaty signed on August 2, 1943, in the Albanian village of Mukje between the nationalist Balli Kombëtar and the communist National Liberation Movement. The two forces would work together in fighting off Italy's control over Albania. However, a dispute arose concerning the status of Kosovo. For the Communist party, the question should have been resolved after the war, without the presence of foreign powers on the national soil. The Yugoslavian Communist Party would have had to return Kosovo to Albania as established by the Comintern. Whereas the Balli Kombëtar proposed to fight for the integration of Kosovo into Albania.

== 1942–1943 activity ==
The nationalists and communists had formed and ad hoc alliance against the Italian occupation, which had been withering away in Albania due to continued attacks. However the debate on the future of Kosovo became notable as the Balli Kombetar supported an Albanian union with Kosovo while the communists, funded and backed by Tito’s Yugoslav Partisans opposed such an annexation leading to a breakdown of relations.

== 1943–1944: Albanian Civil War ==
After the breakdown of the Ballist-LANÇ alliance in 1943 due to the communist opposition to the annexation of Kosovo, the communists began a series of campaigns to eliminate their Ballist opponents across various regions in Albania, but with notably clashes across the south during the Albanian Civil War.

By the summer of 1944, the communists had liberated much of central Albania and seized Tirana with British support by November 1944. Following Tirana’s capture, the communists began the elimination and liquidation of anti-communist forces in the Northern highlands.

== Albanian government ==
After the German Winter Offensive the communist partisans regrouped, attacked the Germans and gained control of southern Albania in April 1944. In May a congress of the National Liberation Front was held in Përmet, during which an Anti-Fascist Council of National Liberation to act as Albania's provisional government was elected. Enver Hoxha became the chairman of the council's executive committee and the National Liberation Army's supreme commander. The communist partisans resisted a German Summer Offensive (May–June 1944) and defeated the last Balli Kombëtar forces in southern Albania by mid-summer 1944 encountering only scattered resistance from the Balli Kombëtar and Legality forces when they entered central and northern Albania by the end of July. On 29 November 1944 partisan forces liberated Shkodra and this is the official date of liberation of the country. A provisional government the communists which has been formed at Berat in October 1944, administered Albania with Enver Hoxha as prime minister up to the elections of December 1945, in which the Democratic Front (successor to the National Liberation Front) won 93% of the vote which was widely described as a sham election due to the lack of non-communist candidates.

== Sources ==
- Dedijer, Vladimir (1949). Jugoslovensko-albanski odnosi. Borba.
- Fischer, Bernd Jürgen (1999). Albania at War, 1939–1945. C. Hurst & Co. Publishers. ISBN 978-1-85065-531-2.
- Pavlović, Blagoje K. (1996). Albanizacija Kosova i Metohije. Evropsko slovo.
- Pearson, Owen (2006b). Albania in the Twentieth Century, A History: Volume II: Albania in Occupation and War, 1939–45. I.B.Tauris. ISBN 978-1-84511-104-5.
- Pearson, Owen (2006c). Albania in the Twentieth Century, A History: Volume III: Albania as Dictatorship and Democracy, 1945–99. I.B.Tauris. ISBN 978-1-84511-105-2.
