= Balli Kombëtar =

World War II Albanian paramilitary organization

National Front
- Balli Kombëtar
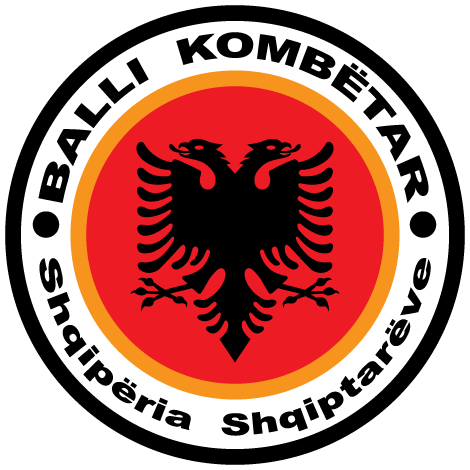
- Leader: Mid'hat Frashëri
- Dates active: 1942–1945
- Dissolved: 1945; 81 years ago
- Active regions: Albania, Kosovo, western and northern parts of North Macedonia, parts of Montenegro, Sandžak , Chameria and Preševo Valley
- Ideology: Greater Albania; Albanian nationalism Republicanism; Liberalism; Fascism; Anti-communism; Anti-fascism
- Size: 35,000–50,000
- Part of: Kingdom of Albania in personal union with Italy (1939–1943) and Albanian Kingdom (1943-44)
- Wars: World War II; World War II in Albania; Battle of Gjorm; Liberation of Tepelena; Battle of Drashovica; Kurtez ambush; Battle of Tirana and Kruja (1943); Battle of Menina; First Battle of Preševo; Second Battle of Preševo; Battle of Desivojca; Albanian Civil War (1943–1944); Battle of Peshkopi; Liberation of Tirana; LANÇ counter-offensive in Albania (1944); Albanian Offensive into Yugoslavia

The Balli Kombëtar (literally National Front) was an Albanian nationalist, collaborationist, fascist and anti-communist resistance movement during the Second World War. It was led by Ali Këlcyra and Midhat Frashëri.

The movement was formed, initially, by republican nationalists who were opposed to both communism and monarchism. Later on, it allied itself with the German occupiers and former Zogists. The group's official platform, detailed in its ten-point "Decalogue", sought the establishment of a democratic, independent ethnic Albanian state. The movement initially participated in the resistance against Italian forces and briefly cooperated with the communist-led National Liberation Movement (LANÇ) through the August 1943 Mukje Agreement. Following the breakdown of the agreement and the Italian capitulation in September 1943, its leadership and regional factions increasingly collaborated with German occupation authorities in their struggle against communist partisans.

The Balli Kombëtar engaged in significant acts of terror, culminating in atrocities committed against Serb and Greek civilians. Defeated by communist forces in Albania and Yugoslavia by the end of the war, the movement was largely driven into exile, although it later re-emerged as a political organization in post-communist Albania.

== History ==
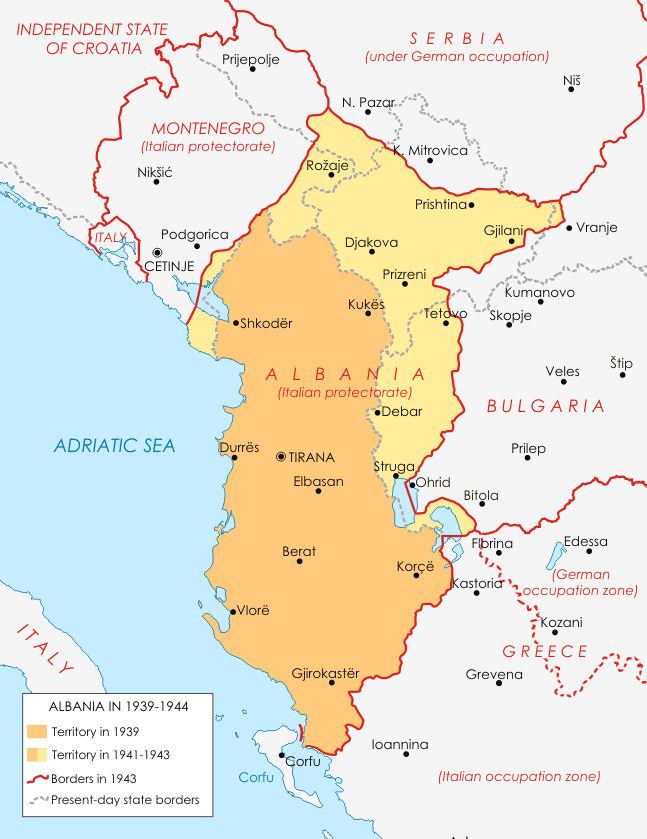
The Italian Protectorate of Albania established by Italy in August 1941

The Balli Kombëtar was officially founded in November 1942 by Midhat Frashëri, joining the efforts of a series of nationalists to resist Italian occupation. It was led by Frashëri and Ali Këlcyra. It tried to find an agreement with the Albanian Partisans of communist affiliation, led by Enver Hoxha and grouped in the "Movement of National Liberation" (LANÇ, for its acronym in Albanian), trying to attract them to the nationalist cause. However, the Balli Kombëtar condemned any cooperation of the LNC with the Yugoslav Partisans, whom it considered natural enemies of Albania, which would soon be a deal breaker.

With Italy on the brink of defeat in 1943, the Albanian National Liberation Movement (LANÇ) and the Balli Kombëtar organized a meeting in the village of Mukje. The Balli Kombëtar entered into a fragile alliance with the communist-led LANÇ, and acted as a resistance group against the Italians. Following the Mukje Agreement, the vague mutual tolerance that had existed between the Ballists and LANÇ quickly evaporated. The Allies too could not guarantee that Kosovo would be a part of Albania, because they stood for the restoration of occupied nations under their borders as they existed prior to World War II.

Wartime clandestine bulletins from the Central State Archives of Albania (AQSH)

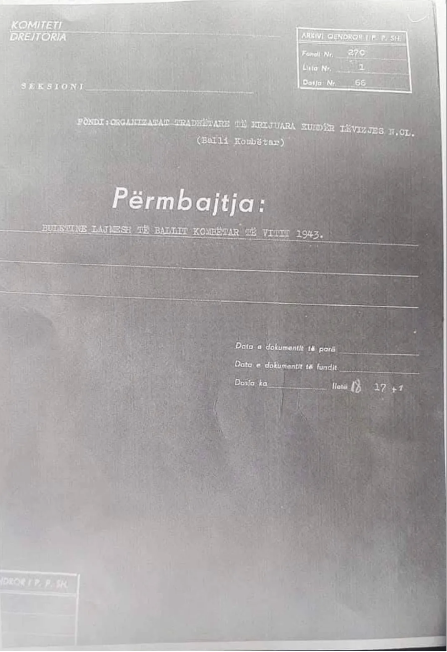
Archival file folder tracking Fondi 270 (Balli Kombëtar) collections.

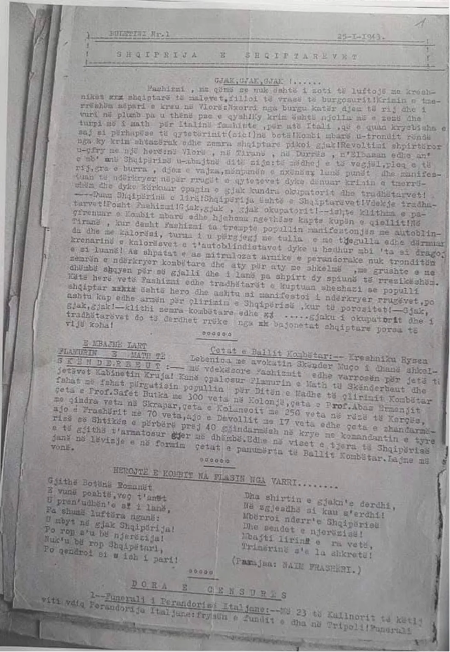
Front page of Buletini Nr. 1 (25 January 1943), calling for resistance against Italian Fascism ("Poshtë Fashizmi").

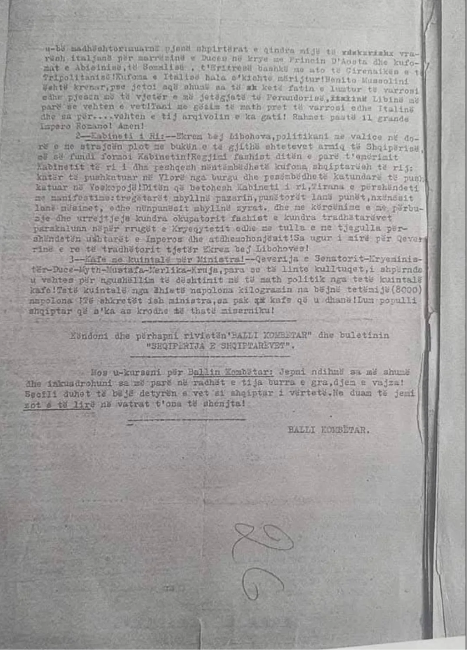
Concluding page of Buletini Nr. 1, denouncing the Libohova quisling cabinet as a fascist regime.

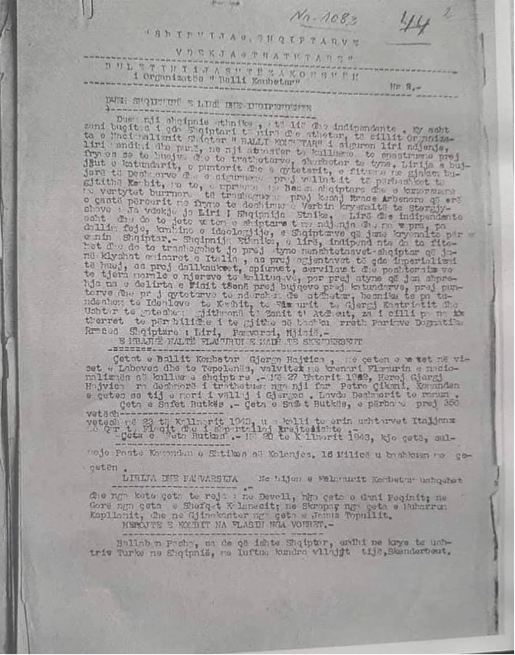
Buletini i Jashtëzakonshëm Nr. 2, detailing active regional combat engagements against Axis forces under Safet Butka.

Despite their lukewarm attitude towards the Allies, the Ballists feared that an Allied victory in the war might well result in LANÇ victory and communist control of Albania. Their lukewarm attitude towards the British was also fostered by their desire to preserve the occupied united Albanian state under the borders drawn by the Italians in 1941, for they bitterly opposed and dreaded the loss of Kosovo and Debar to Yugoslavia once again, and feared that the Allies in their support of the Greeks might prevent them from claiming Chameria and deprive them of their southern provinces of Korçe and Gjirokaster, the heartland of their liberation movement. They regarded the Yugoslavs and the Greeks as their real enemies.

The Mukje Agreement immediately triggered a hostile reaction from the Yugoslav representative in Albania, Svetozar Vukmanoviċ. He denounced the agreement and put pressure on the LANÇ to repute it immediately,.

The Balli Kombëtar, which had fought against the Italians, were threatened by the superior forces of the LANÇ and the Yugoslav Partisans, who were backed by the Allies. In the autumn of 1943, Nazi Germany occupied all of Albania after Italy was defeated. Fearing reprisals from larger forces, the Balli Kombëtar made a deal with the Germans and formed a "neutral government" in Tirana which continued its war with the LANÇ and the Yugoslav Partisans.

=== Albania ===
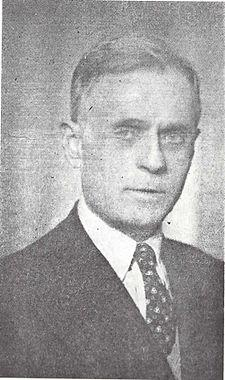
Midhat Frashëri was the leader of the Balli Kombëtar.

Safet Butka, a hardline Albanian nationalist, tried at various times to cooperate with the Communist-dominated Liberation Front (LANÇ). By January 1943, in Southern Albania, some Partisan units fought alongside the Balli Kombëtar during the Battle of Gjorm where they defeated and routed the Italian troops. In February 1943, he organized a meeting with communist-led LANÇ representatives and an agreement for cooperation was reached in March 1943. He also made another local agreement in August 1943 and was one of the initiators and supporters of the Mukje agreement. The communist-led LANÇ had demanded that Kosovo be ceded to Albania after the war. The LANÇ met with the Ballists in August 1943, agreeing upon the establishment of Greater Albania. The agreement was however short-lived. The agreement was then denounced by Albanian communists. In the south of Albania, the rivalry between the Communists and the Balli Kombëtar heated up. The Communists almost immediately repudiated the Mukaj agreement, and fearing the British might open a second front in the Balkans and lend their support to the Ballists, they issued orders that the Balli Kombëtar be eliminated wherever it was found. These factors contributed to members of the Balli Kombëtar forming a strong hatred for the Communists.

After forming the collaborator government, the Ballists pressed hard against the Communists. They destroyed a fairly large Communist Partisan group southwest of Tirana. By the Fall of 1943 the Ballists, assisted by German forces, were also involved in vicious fighting against the Northern Epirus Liberation Front in Southern Albania. This Greek Nationalist group was destroyed during these clashes and was eliminated as a fighting force.

With the Grand Alliance established, the Germans began losing the war. This also affected the situation in Albania as the Germans could not supply the Ballists. With the current situation favouring the Communists, the Partisans began a full-scale attack on the Balli Kombëtar. British liaison officers in Albania noted that the Communists were using the arms they received to fight fellow Albanians far more than to harass the Germans. The west noted that the Communists could not have won without the supplies and armaments from the British, America and Yugoslavia, and that the LANÇ were not afraid of murdering their own countrymen.

=== Kosovo and Western Macedonia ===
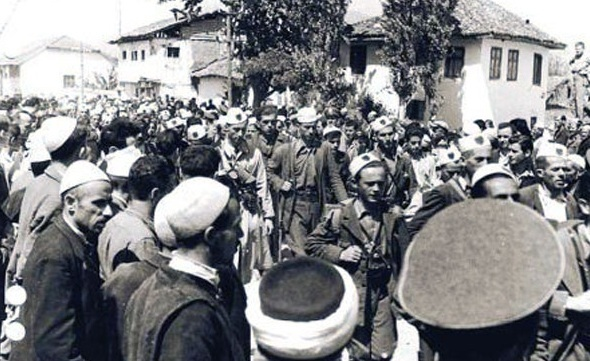
Ballist forces enter Prizren

The Ballists in Kosovo and Vardar region rose to prominence following the capitulation of Italy in September 1943. They seized Struga and Debar from the Italians on 9 September 1943, taking much of the military equipment left behind. Following the establishment of the Albanian Kingdom, leading members of the Balli Kombetar from Kosovo became involved in forming the new government. On 6 November 1943, Berlin announced that the regents and the assembly had formed a government headed by Kosovar Albanian Rexhep Mitrovica, who had joined the Balli Kombëtar resistance movement in 1942 and spent much of the Italian period in prison in Porto Romano near Durrës. Mitrovica's cabinet, most of whom had credentials as nationalists as well as some German or Austrian connection, included Xhafer Deva. Deva, a leading Ballist also from Kosovo, was appointed Minister of the Interior in the Government of Rexhep Mitrovica and collaborated with the Germans to oppose the spread of Communist forces in the north, effectively giving him direct command over the forces of the new government. The fighting in Kosovo took on an ethnic and ideological basis with the Albanian Balli Kombetar forces fighting the predominantly Serb Partisans.

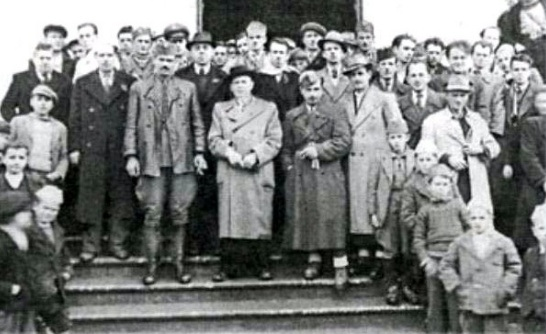
Convention of Ballists in Tetovo 1944 (centre left Xhem Hasa)

In Vardar Macedonia, when it was a part of the independent state of Albania, the German and Ballist forces had occasional skirmishes with Yugoslav Partisans. Kicevo, which remained in the hands of Macedonian and Albanian Partisan units following the capitulation of Italy, was attacked by the Ballists of Xhem Hasa in early November 1943. After 7 days of fierce fighting, the Partisans were defeated and forced to retreat from the city. Fiqri Dine, Xhem Hasa and Hysni Dema, as well as three German Majors, also directed military campaigns against the Albanian and Yugoslav Partisans. When Maqellarë, midway between Debar and Peshkopi, was recaptured by the Fifth Partisan Brigade, the Germans with the assistance of the Ballist forces of Xhem Hasa launched an attack from Debar, defeating the Partisans. The main centres of the Balli Kombëtar in these regions were Kosovska Mitrovica, Drenica and Tetovo. It was noted that the Balli Kombëtar in these regions were more aggressive than the Ballists of Albania. With the tables now turned in their favour many Ballists saw an opportunity to take their revenge upon their Serbian neighbours for the suffering they had endured over previous two decades, burning perhaps as many as 30,000 houses belonging to Serbs and Montenegrins. Most vulnerable to these attacks were Serbs who had settled in Kosovo in the interwar period.

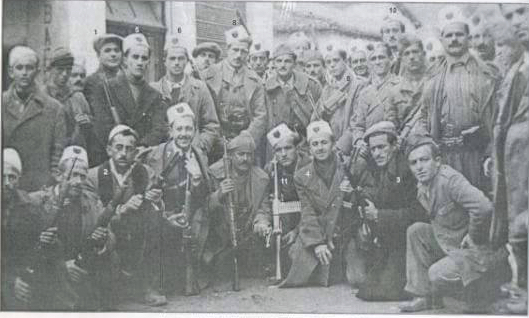
Ballist in Debar.

In October 1944, as the German Army began retreating through Kosovo, fierce battles between the Germans and the Partisans broke out. After the Germans had been driven out, Tito ordered the collection of weapons in Kosovo and the arrest of prominent Albanians. The order was not well received and, combined with passions felt about Kosovo, inflamed an insurrection. On 2 December 1944, anti-communist Albanians from the Drenica region attacked the Trepca mining complex and other targets. Numbering at most 2,000 men, these anti-communists managed to hold off a Partisan force of 30,000 troops for two months. Similarly in Kičevo, Gostivar and Tetovo, the remaining Ballists tried to remain in control of the region after the Yugoslav Partisans announced victory. Now "an armed uprising of massive proportions" broke out in Kosovo led by the Balli Kombëtar (which still had around 9,000 men under arms at the time), which aimed to resist incorporation of Kosovo into communist Yugoslavia. It was only in July 1945 that the Yugoslav Partisans were able to put down the uprising and establish their control over Kosovo.

=== Montenegro and Sandžak region ===
Parts of Montenegro and the Sandžak were annexed into Albania in 1941. The cities included Bijelo Polje, Tutin, Plav, Gusinje, Rozaje and Ulcinj. Some of the Yugoslav Muslims that lived in these regions sided with the Albanians. Novi Pazar remained under the control of Acif Hadziahmetovic who was a member of the nationalist Balli Kombëtar movement, right up until December 1944. During this time the region between Ballist held Novi Pazar and Chetnik controlled Raška, witnessed constant fighting between the Albanians, Yugoslav Muslims and Serbs in the narrow valley that separates the two towns.

=== Greece ===
Balli Kombëtar was also active in northwestern Greece, in particular in a region referred to by Albanians as Chameria. Administration of the Thesprotia prefecture was handed over to the Albanians, although this region was not officially annexed into the Albanian kingdom. The "Balli Kombëtar Çam" (Cham National Front), founded in 1943 by Nuri Dino, received full German support since they were willing to fight both Albanian and Greek Communist Partisans. These units were used in anti-Partisan operations in Greece codenamed Augustus. By the time Operation Augustus ended, a larger number Chams were recruited for armed support. Their support was appreciated by the Germans: Lt Colonel Josef Remold remarked that "with their knowledge of the surrounding area, they have proved their value in the scouting missions". On several occasions, these scouting missions engaged EDES units in combat. On 27 September (1943), combined German and Cham forces launched large scale operation in villages north of Paramythia: Eleftherochori, Seliani, Semelika, Aghios Nikolaos. In this operation the Cham contingent numbered 150 men, and, according to German Major Stöckert, "performed very well".

=== Atrocities ===
Under the idea of creating a racially pure Greater Albania, the Balli Kombëtar enacted campaigns of terror against Serb civilians in Kosovo and Montenegro. Following the founding of the Second League of Prizren, the Balli Kombëtar combined with the SS Skanderbeg division massacred thousands of Serbs and expelled between 10,000 and 100,000 Serb civilians from the region. In October 1943 during a large-scale German offensive in southern Albania, the Balli Kombëtar in conjunction with German troops attacked Greek villages and committed numerous atrocities including burning villages and executing civilians.

Between 1941 and 1944, 20.000 ca. Macedonians due to Ballist atrocities, fled from Western Macedonia, especially from Reka and Tetovo region, to Skopje and Bitola, then Bulgaria.

=== Revival ===
The Balli Kombëtar was revived in Albania as a political party in the early 1990s. Founded under the leadership of Abas Ermenji, a surviving Ballist, who escaped from Albania when the communists declared victory in 1945. In 1996 it won 5 percent of the popular vote and two seats in parliament. It has since declined. In the 2001 elections it was part of the Union for Victory (Bashkimi për Fitoren) coalition which received 37.1% of the vote and 46 members of parliament.

The National Front has chapters in Kosovo, led by Sylejman Daka & in North Macedonia, led by Vebi Xhemaili.

== Ideology ==
The Balli Kombëtar ideology was fascist, Albanian nationalist and irredentist. Its political objectives included the establishment of a Greater Albania, and its anti-communist orientation brought it into conflict with the communist-led National Liberation Movement.

The movement's political programme was also associated with fascist nationalism and Albanian chauvinism.

Balli Kombëtar was also described in connection with collaboration with the Nazi-fascist occupation forces in Albania during the National Liberation War. Yugoslav Communist leader Milovan Đilas subsequently described the Balli Kombëtar as "Albanian Fascists".

The movement was initially based around republican nationalists who were opposed to both communism and monarchism. Its political program was republican, anti-feudal, generally liberal and also nationalist. These views were reflective of the supporters of Fan Noli who had been driven out by King Zog I.

Midhat Frashëri believed that Albanian provinces under the Ottoman Empire were unfairly partitioned during World War I amongst Yugoslavia and Greece. After World War II, Midhat Frashëri began advocating for a Greater Albania. When Midhat Frashëri formed the Balli Kombëtar, it was based on his nationalist ideas and the old ideologies of his father Abdyl Frashëri, Ymer Prizreni and Pashko Vasa, and the natural progression of the Albanian Vilayet. The works of Franz Nopcsa, Johann Georg von Hahn and Milan Šufflay, helped strengthen the nationalists' cause. The party also had a strong agrarian socialist wing, which gained the leadership of the party after the war with its leader Abaz Ermenji, and also Zef Pali, Halil Maçi and Vasil Andoni.

The motto of the Balli Kombëtar was: Shqipëria Shqiptarëve, Vdekje Tradhëtarëve (Albania to the Albanians, Death to the Traitors). The original objectives of Balli Kombëtar were set out in 1942 in the following ten-point program, also known as the "Decalogue":

The Decalogue states:

1. We are fighting for the red and black flag, for the defence of the rights of the Albanian people
2. We are fighting for a democratic, ethnic and free Albania with a modern society
3. We are fighting for an Albania in which freedom of speech and thought will prevail
4. We are fighting for an Albania with a proper economic and social balance so that there will be no more exploiters and exploited, that is to say, so that no one will live at the expense of his fellow man, so that there will be no farmers without enough land to live on, so that there will be no blue and white-collar workers without housing and security, i.e. we are fighting for a stable Albania with a thoroughly reformed economic system in accordance with the wishes and needs of the Albanian people
5. We are fighting for an Albania in which the suppressed talents of all strata of the population will come to light, be supported and flourish with the help of Albanian schooling
6. We are fighting for an Albania in which all positive contributions will be properly appreciated, independent of age, region or faith
7. We are fighting to create an Albania run by people who have not been compromised, by Albanians who have done their utmost at every time and under all conditions for the salvation and welfare of their country, by competent and honest working men
8. We are fighting for an Albania that, in a strict and exemplary manner, will punish all anti-patriots, traitors, lackeys, troublemakers, speculators and spies; for an Albania in which there will be no place for hypocrites, sycophants, feudal oppressors and anyone who hinders the development and progress of our renascent country
9. We are fighting to harmonize and unite the creative energies of the nation, to create an intellectual and spiritual union of all Albanians
10. We are fighting to mobilize all the vital forces of the nation against the occupiers in order to realize the ideals of Balli Kombëtar

== Aftermath ==
After World War II ended, the Balli Kombëtar were defeated by Yugoslav and Albanian communists. The Ballists were so thoroughly discredited by their collaboration with the Nazis that there was no chance of them having a role in postwar Albania, though it took until 1945 to finish them off. Ironically, the Ballists' decision to work with the Nazis brought about the one thing they had sought to prevent – a Communist-dominated government. Balli Kombëtar fighters fled the Balkans to Austria, the United States, Australia, Switzerland and South America. The Ballists who did not escape were executed. An organization was set up in exile.

Many Ballists that managed to escape Albania subsequently set up the CIA backed Free Albania Committee, aimed at organising the Albanian diaspora to overthrow Enver Hoxha's Communist regime in Albania. Starting in 1949 British and American trained Albanian fighters (consisting of men from Balli Kombëtar and the monarchist movement, known as Legaliteti) were parachuted into Albania with the aim of organizing a popular revolt against Hoxha, marking the start of the Albanian Subversion. The operation failed, thanks in no small part to infamous double agent Kim Philby, who leaked crucial details of the plan to the communist authorities who were consequently able to intercept many of the fighters upon arrival. The subversion cost the lives of at least 300 men and for a long time was one of the most carefully concealed secrets of the Cold War.

In 1950, the Balli Kombëtar (in-exile) was divided into two wings, one Agrarian headed by Abas Ermenji, and one headed by Ali Këlcyra.

== Legacy ==
=== North Macedonia ===
Tetovo was once the largest Balli Kombëtar base in the region and still has strong ties with the name. The Tetovo-based football club KF Shkëndija has a large support firm called the Ballistët. They are known in the media in North Macedonia for their use of hardline nationalistic rhetoric in football matches. The most notable Ballist leader in Macedonia was Xhem Hasa from Gostivar. A statue of him was erected in Simnica, just south of Gostivar, by local Albanians.

=== Albania ===
In Albania, there are streets in Tirana and Kavajë named after co-founder Mid'hat Frashëri, who was reburied in the Grand Park of Tirana in November 2018. Tirana also has streets dedicated to Sokrat Dodbiba, Mitrovica’s minister of finance, with an additional street in Elbasan, and Mehdi Frashëri, member of the High Regency Council.

=== Kosovo ===
In Pristina, Mid'hat Frashëri has streets named after him and also in Mitrovica, as well as a school in Gjurakoc. Franciscan friar Anton Harapi has streets bearing his name in Pristina and Peja. There are streets named after Rexhep Mitrovica in Pristina and Mitrovica. Rexhep Krasniqi has a Pristina street named after him. Xhaver Deva, Albanian minister of the interior, has streets in Pristina and Mitrovica named after him.

== See also ==
- Albanian Fascist Party
- 21st Waffen Mountain Division of the SS Skanderbeg (1st Albanian)
- Vullnetari
- Këshilla
- Greater Albania
- History of Albania

== Sources ==
- Blamires, Cyprian (2006). World Fascism: A-K. ABC-CLIO. ISBN 1-57607-940-6.
- Clark, Howard (2000). Civil Resistance in Kosovo. Pluto Press. ISBN 9780745315690.
- Malcolm, Noel (1998). Kosovo: A Short History. London: Macmillan. ISBN 9780333666128.
- Dželetović, Pavle Ivanov (2000). Balistički pokret: 1939–1952: masovnost, saradnja sa italijanskim i nemačkim okupatorima i zločini nad Srbima. Arhiv Srbije.
- Fischer, Bernd Jürgen (1999). Albania at War, 1939–1945. C. Hurst & Co. Publishers. ISBN 978-1-85065-531-2.
- Jankowski, Tomek (2014). Eastern Europe!. Steerforth Press. ISBN 9780985062330.
- Johnstone, Diana (2002). Fools' Crusade Yugoslavia, Nato, and Western Delusions. Monthly Review Press. ISBN 9781583670842.
- King, Iain; Mason, Whit (2006). Peace at Any Price: How the World Failed Kosovo. United Kingdom: Cornwell University Press. ISBN 978-0-8014-4539-2.
- Lampe, John (2000). Yugoslavia as History - Twice There Was a Country. Cambridge University Press. ISBN 9780521774017.
- Mangerich, Agnes (2010). Albanian Escape - The True Story of U.S. Army Nurses Behind Enemy Lines. University Press of Kentucky. ISBN 9780813127422.
- Rossos, Andrew (2013). Macedonia and the Macedonians: A history. Stanford: Hoover Institution Press. ISBN 9780817948832.
- Pearson, Owen (2006). Albania in the Twentieth Century, A History: Volume II: Albania in Occupation and War, 1940–45. I.B.Tauris. ISBN 978-1-84511-104-5.
- Roberts, Walter R. (1987). Tito, Mihailović, and the Allies, 1941–1945. Duke University Press. ISBN 0-8223-0773-1.
- Ramet, Sabrina P. (2006). The Three Yugoslavias: State-building and Legitimation, 1918–2005. Indiana University Press. ISBN 0-253-34656-8.
- Vickers, Miranda (1998). Between Serb and Albanian: a history of Kosovo. Hurst & Co. ISBN 9781850652786.
- World Peace Council (1951). First Session of the World Peace Council, Berlin, February 21–26, 1951: Report and Documents.
- Birri-Tomovska, Kristina (2012). Jews of Yugoslavia, 1918–1941: A History of Macedonian Sephards. Peter Lang. ISBN 978-3-0343-1166-3.
- Thompson, Mark (1992). A Paper House: The Ending of Yugoslavia. Pantheon Books. ISBN 978-0-679-42187-0.
- Hoxha, Enver (1986). The Superpowers, 1959–1984: Extracts from the Political Diary. 8 Nëntori.
- Dingu, Kadri (2001). Lufta antifashiste nacional çlirimtare: epopeja e lavdishme e popullit shqiptar. Arian.
- Kekezi, Harillaq; Hida, Rexhep, eds. (1990). What the Kosovars Say and Demand: Collection of Studies, Articles, Interviews, and Commentaries. Vol. 2. 8 Nëntori Publishing House.
- Jacques, Edwin E. (2009). The Albanians: An Ethnic History from Prehistoric Times to the Present. McFarland. ISBN 978-0-7864-4238-6.
- "Review of International Affairs". Review of International Affairs: 25. 1981.
- Ministry of Foreign Affairs of the Federal People's Republic of Yugoslavia (1980). White Book on Aggressive Activities by the Governments of the USSR, Poland, Czechoslovakia, Hungary, Rumania, Bulgaria and Albania Towards Yugoslavia. Belgrade: Ministry of Foreign Affairs of the Federal People's Republic of Yugoslavia. p. 169.
