= Kachak Movement =

Series of Albanian uprisings

- Part of Yugoslav colonization of Kosovo
Date	6 May 1919 – 1927
Location	Kingdom of Yugoslavia (Kosovo, Sandžak and Vardar Macedonia)
Result	Yugoslav-Zogist victory
Territorial changes	Yugoslavia re-annexes the Neutral Zone of Junik

Belligerents
Kachaks; Committee for the National Defence of Kosovo	Kingdom of Yugoslavia; Principality of Albania (from 1922 onwards)

Commanders and leaders
Hasan Prishtina; Bajram Curri X Hoxha Kadri; Azem Galica †; Shote Galica; Sadik Rama; Elez Isufi †; Agan Koja; Idriz Seferi; Xhel Guri	(Kingdom of Yugoslavia) Alexander I (Albania) Ahmet Zogu

Units involved
Kachaks	Royal Yugoslav Army (Albania) Royal Albanian Gendarmerie

Strength
At least 10,000 in the first phase (1919–1920); At least 1,000 in the second phase (1921–1926)	Unknown (Albania) Unknown

Casualties and losses
Unknown	Unknown (Albania) Unknown
- Approximately 12,000 Kosovo Albanian civilians killed between 1918 and 1921; 30,000–40,000 Albanians forced to flee Kosovo in 1919

The Kachak Movement was a series of Albanian uprisings in Albanian-populated territories in Kosovo, Vardar Macedonia and Sandžak from 1919 to 1927. The uprisings began after the end of the First World War when Kosovo became part of the new Kingdom of Serbs, Croats, and Slovenes (also known as Yugoslavia). Parts of the Albanian population which resisted Yugoslav rule formed the Kachak guerrilla movement under the leadership of the Committee for the National Defence of Kosovo and conducted military operations and guerrilla-style attacks against Yugoslav soldiers and administrative establishments.

In response to the rebellions, Yugoslav authorities retaliated by conducting operations against the rebels and the civilian population. During this period, many atrocities were reported against the Albanian population, which included massacres, destruction of villages and looting. It is estimated that approximately 12,000 Kosovo Albanians were killed from 1918 to 1921 alone, and this number would have been surpassed by the time the Kachak Movement was finally suppressed in 1927 due to the combined efforts of Yugoslavia and Ahmet Zogu, who scattered the leaders of the Kosovo Committee and quelled the resistance of most of the Kachak bands.

The Yugoslav colonisation of Kosovo was intensified after the suppression of the Kachak Movement, and during the interwar period, over a third of the agricultural land available in Kosovo would be confiscated by Yugoslav authorities. Half of that was distributed to around 60,000 Serbo-Montenegrin colonists who were settled in Kosovo during and after the Kachak Movement, and around 90,000-150,000 Albanians and other Muslims migrated from Kosovo during the interwar period.

== Background ==
Before the creation of the Independent State of Albania, Kosovo had been a center of Albanian Nationalism. In 1878, the League of Prizren was formed, functioning as a political and military organization of Albanian leaders which tried to defend Albanian inhabited lands from partition. It was also the centre of the Albanian revolt of 1910 and 1912. Despite having over a 75% majority Albanian population according to Serbian reports, it had a less than 25% Non-Albanian (mostly Serb) minority, who wished to join the Kingdom of Serbia. These Albanian-inhabited regions were officially separated from Albania against their will in 1913, but they revolted almost annually against occupying Serbian forces in 1912, 1913, 1914, 1915 and twice in 1919.

Many Albanians in Kosovo and Albania resisted being incorporated in the often changing Yugoslav regimes, knowing that the new Yugoslav forces were the same Serbo-Montenegrin troops who had committed massacres and ethnic cleansing of Albanian civilians. Albanians viewed peaceful co-existence as unattainable given the terror and violence they experienced.

After World War I, Serbia suffered greatly from Austro-Hungarian occupation and Kosovo saw clashes between Albanians and Serbs. In 1918, the Allies of World War I rewarded Serbia for its effort with the formation of a Serbian-centralized Kingdom of Serbs, Croats and Slovenes which kept Kosovo as part of Serbia. The conditions for Kosovar Albanians deteriorated as Serbian authorities implemented assimilation tactics such as closing down Albanian language schools while encouraging Albanians to emigrate. The Kingdom promoted the settlement of Serb and Slav settlers to Kosovo, thus beginning the Yugoslav colonization of Kosovo.

Parts of the Albanian population that resisted Serbian rule in Kosovo organised a military resistance against the Yugoslav authorities and formed the Kachaks. Under the political leadership of Hasan Prishtina and Bajram Curri, the movement based itself in Shkodër and was led by the Committee for the National Defence of Kosovo organization formed on 1 May 1918. Among their demands were the re-opening of Albanian language schools, recognition of Albanian as a co-official language and autonomy, with the goal of uniting Kosovo with Albania.

== Rise of the Kachak Movement ==
In direct response to the military repression and Serbian efforts to disarm Albanians and install Serbian mayors and local officials, Albanian Kachaks in Macedonia began to overthrow Serbian offices, attack courts and trains, and rustle cattle; in late 1918, some 10,000 animals were stolen in the Dibër region alone. Albanian Kachaks were also active around Ohrid and Manastir.

Disaffected Kosovar Albanians, who had rallied around Hasan Prishtina, formed a 'Committee for the National Defence of Kosovo' in 1918 that was based in Shkodër, with their main demand being the unification of Kosovo with Albania. The Kosovo Committee predominantly consisted of Kosovo Albanian representatives of the Albanian National Awakening, and at this time were headed by Kadri Prishtina.

=== Uprising of 1919 ===
In the months of January-February 1919 alone, Serbian troops killed 6,040 people in Kosovo and destroyed 3,873 homes. Although the number of insurgent groups in Kosovo was growing, their efforts remained confined to local actions. The need for coordination and cooperation among them became increasingly evident, prompting the Kosovo Committee to call for a general uprising in Kosovo on April 24, 1919, to oppose the incorporation of Kosovo into Yugoslavia, which resulted in the Kachak Movement. Messages were distributed across Kosovo by loyal Kosovo Committee members, and faced with this growing unrest, the Serbian government responded not only with open violence but also with deceit, threats and manipulation. Additionally, they placed bounties on the commanders of the Albanian cheta groups, offering rewards for the murder of Azem Galica, Sadik Rama, Ramadan Shabani, Mehmet Konjuhi and others.

On April 28–29, 1919, a battle occurred in the village of Radishevë between Azem and Shote Galica's band and Yugoslav forces. On the night of May 5, 1919, Azem Galica and his unit surrounded Devič, the Yugoslav administrative centre of Drenica, and launched an attack the following morning on May 6. A major battle unfolded during the assault. Coinciding with the feast of Saint George, the uprising officially began that same day, on May 6, 1919, in the region of Llapushë and around Peja, in line with the agreement made by the leaders of the uprising. The best known of the Kachak leaders were Bajram Curri, Hasan Prishtina and Azem Galica. The Committee issued strict guidelines to their Kachaks, urging them to refrain from targeting, harming or mistreating unarmed Slavs, and to refrain from burning houses or churches. Instead, the Kachaks targeted the Yugoslav army and administrative buildings. The Serbian authorities regarded them as mere bandits and, in response to their rebellion, retaliated by conducting indiscriminate operations against the Kachaks as well as the civilian population.

Contemporary Serbian military reports clearly indicate that a powerful resistance had been brewing in the region. The large-scale revolt was centred in the region of Drenica, involving around 10,000 fighters under the central command of Azem Galica and Sadik Rama by the middle of May 1919. Their headquarters was initially based in Gjurgjevik and later in Sferka e Gashit, both villages in the Llapusha region, and all the villages between Rahovec, Drenica, Peja and Istog were liberated by the Kachaks. After weeks of fierce clashes and heavy casualties on both sides, the Yugoslavs temporarily halted their military operations and called for talks with the leaders of the uprising. In actuality, the Yugoslavs - whose forces had been exhausted after weeks of warfare - sought to bring new reinforcements to Kosovo and to rest and reposition their troops.

Azem and the other Kachak leaders presented a set of demands to Serbian officials: they asked the Kingdom of Yugoslavia to stop killing Albanians, to recognise the Kosovo Albanians' right to self-government, and to stop both the Yugoslav colonization program of Kosovo and the military actions of Yugoslav forces on the pretext of disarmament. They also requested that Albanian schools were opened, that the Albanian language was made an official administrative language, and that the families of the Albanian rebels were no longer interned by the authorities. The Yugoslavs responded to the attempts at communication with increased violence, and an increasing number of Serbian militias and Chetnik bands were deployed.

The Albanians did not trust in the negotiations with the Yugoslavs, who had proven themselves to be deceitful thus far. As such, they did not accept any agreements with the Yugoslavs as long as their armies remained in Kosovo. The Yugoslavs, who did not want the uprising to gain international attention, brought in new reinforcements from Skopje and Niš and surrounded the rebels. On June 6, 1919, Chetnik and Yugoslav military forces launched a surprise attack against the insurgents from all sides. On June 7–8, Albanian fighters were attacked in the area around Rahovec, and the city was burned by the Yugoslav army. In the final battles, the Serbs deployed 13 cannons, 22 machine guns, and tens of thousands of troops. Over 600 insurgents were killed, and the Serbian army also suffered heavy losses. The battle around Rahovec and Gjurgjevik i Madh proved decisive for the course of the uprising. From that point onward, the intensity of the fighting began to wane. Some insurgents retreated into the mountains in small groups, while others were forced to flee to Albania. The Yugoslavs had deployed its most elite artillery units against the rebels. Villages on both sides of the White Drin were burned and levelled. In the Rahovec district alone, more than 20 villages were destroyed, and hundreds of men, women, the elderly, and children were killed. The uprising was eventually suppressed by the Yugoslav army by November 1920, however, and many of the Kachaks fled to Shkodra.

== Neutral Zone of Junik ==
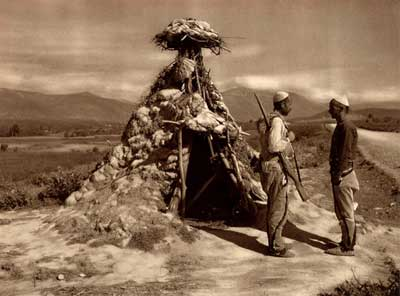
Kachaks in the 1920s controlling a road in Kosovo.

In April 1921, Azem Galica returned to Kosovo to revive the Kachak Movement. As a calculated act of provocation, the Yugoslav government had interned the families of suspected Kachaks to camps in central Serbia during the spring of 1921, which intensified the resistance, and Yugoslav authorities continued to form armed bands from local Serbs to help deal with the Kachaks. In July 1921, the Kosovo Committee submitted a document to the League of Nations in which they reported Serbian atrocities against Albanians and identified the victims. They recorded that Serbian forces killed 12,371 people in Kosovo, imprisoned 22,110 and burnt down roughly 6,000 houses.

In an attempt to drain the Kachak Movement by disrupting their support from Albania, the Yugoslavs incited pro-Yugoslav factions in northern Albania to rebel against the government, ultimately giving rise to the short-lived Republic of Mirdita. A conflict zone was then established, and troops from both states crossed into the territory of the other. The Neutral Zone of Junik was established in November 1921 by the authority of the League of Nations following constant border disputes between Albania and the Kingdom of Yugoslavia, the frequent military intrusion from the Yugoslav side since 1918 into the Albanian side as well as continuous skirmishes between the Albanian guerrillas and Yugoslavian army. Most of the Kachak bands based themselves in the Neutral Zone, and some of the other political figures involved in the Kosovo Committee, such as Hasan Prishtina, also relocated to Junik.

The Kachaks were primarily concerned with self-government and preserving their traditional way of life. The Kanun - a set of traditional Albanian customary law codes - prevailed as the legislative basis of the Neutral Zone of Junik, which was a deeply traditional area and consisted of multiple clan leaders. The Kosovo Committee functioned more as a link to the state of Albania, whilst everyday life in the Neutral Zone followed more traditional customs.

Despite the Kachak Movement's popularity amongst Albanians, it was not only opposed by the Yugoslav government, but also by Ahmet Bej Zogu and his supporters. In 1922, Zog - who was at this time Minister of the Interior in Albania and a known opponent of the Kosovo Committee, began to disarm Albanian Highlander tribes in the north of the country as well as those within the Neutral Zone of Junik. Zogu also gave orders to the relevant administrative bodies of the state to attack the Neutral Zone and to liquidate the Kachaks wherever they found them, but particularly in Junik.

In March 1922, Bajram Curri, Hasan Prishtina and Elez Isufi led an unsuccessful attempt at overthrowing Zog, who eventually became the Prime Minister of Albania on 2 December 1922. His quarrels with the leaders of the Kosovar Albanians made him a fierce opponent of the Kachak Movement, and of Kosova in particular. Zog's ascension to power resulted in the end of Albanian governmental support for Kosova, and he gradually assassinated the leaders of the Kosovo Committee or drove them into exile. In January 1923, Curri and Prishtina led another unsuccessful attempt at overthrowing Zog; in between these two unsuccessful attempts, Zogu entered into a secret agreement with the Yugoslavs, promising to destroy the Kachak bands among other things. Azem Galica and his main force of around 1,000 Kachaks were betrayed to the Yugoslavs by Zogu's regime. In January 1923, Zog's forces, in coordination with the Yugoslavs, invaded the Neutral Zone of Junik; the Kachaks left the zone and moved further into Kosovo, and the area was ceded to the Yugoslavs.

Isuf Mehani, an anti-Yugoslav Albanian leader from Sandžak, led cheta bands in the lower Sandžak area, including Novi Pazar, Rožaje, Sjenica, Kolašin and Bihor from 1924 onwards.

During the course of the Kachak Movement, the Yugoslavs attempted to pacify the Albanians of Kosovo using armed Chetnik bands and colonists, but ultimately, it was the international pressure and the lack of support from the Zogist regime of Albania that finally sapped the Kachak Movement.

The Kachak Movement was finally defeated in 1927. The leaders of the Albanian resistance either fell in battle, such as Azem Galica in 1924, or were murdered and assassinated by the Zogist regime of Albania, such as Hasan Prishtina and Bajram Curri. The Kosova Committee was broken apart by the Zogist regime, and Kosovo remained in the hands of the Yugoslavs.

== Aftermath ==
According to Sabrina P. Ramet, approximately 12,000 Albanians were killed in Kosovo between 1918 and 1921. Some accounts state that between the years 1912-1920, 150,000 Albanians were driven out of Kosovo by the Serbs. In July 1921, the Kosovo Committee recorded that the Serbs had killed 12,371 Kosovar Albanians and imprisoned 22,110 more. These figures would have been surpassed by the time the Kachak Movement was finally crushed.

More than 6,000 Albanians (mainly civilians) were killed by Yugoslav forces in January-February 1919 alone, accompanied by the destruction of 3,873 homes and the expulsion of 40,000 Albanians from Kosovo by 1921 who were forced to flee to Albania. There was a more gradual exodus of Kosovo Albanians to Turkey, which numbered to around 45,000 by 1939.

Following the Kachak Movement, the Yugoslav colonization of Kosovo would be intensified by the Yugoslav authorities and around 60,000 Serb and Montenegrin colonists would settle in Kosovo, including those who had participated in the repression. The Yugoslav government promoted this policy under the guise of agrarian reform, and although this would have also benefitted Albanians in principle, they received smaller plots than Serb colonists. The land reforms also prompted tenants in Serb-controlled Kosovo, Macedonia and Novi Pazar to stop paying rent to their mostly Muslim landlords. Although the reform process was still incomplete when Yugoslavia entered World War II in 1941, 200,000 hectares of agricultural land in Kosovo (over a third of the total amount of agricultural land available) were confiscated from their original owners during the interwar period, and half of it was distributed to colonists. Additionally, around 90,000-150,000 Albanians and other Muslims migrated from Kosovo during the interwar period.

In the Second World War, most of Kosovo was incorporated into Italian-controlled Albania, and during the occupation of Kosovo, 70,000-100,000 Serbians were deported or forced to flee by the Albanian authorities. Albanian authorities also targeted Yugoslav colonists while simultaneously bringing 72,000 Albanian colonists to Kosovo from Albania.

== Legacy ==
The uprising of 1919 in particular stands as one of the most renowned Albanian revolts in Kosovo during the interwar period, and although the resistance against Serbian rule diminished at times, it was never extinguished. The aspiration for freedom and national unity with Albania amongst Kosovo Albanians, which was something they had worked toward since the time of the League of Prizren, would continue.
