= Neutral Zone of Junik =

Border area between Yugoslavia and Albania (1921–1923)

- Zona Neutrale e Junikut
- Albanian–Yugoslav border

Site information
- Type: Neutral demilitarized border
- Condition: Military presence forbidden

Site history
- Built by: League of Nations
- In use: November 1921–January 1923
- Events: Kachak Movement

The Neutral Zone of Junik (1921–1923) was a neutral demilitarized border area between the Kingdom of Serbs, Croats, and Slovenes and the Principality of Albania.

== History ==
=== Establishment ===
The neutral area was established in November 1921 by the authority of the League of Nations following border disputes between the two countries and the frequent military intrusion from the Yugoslav side since 1918 into the Albanian side as well as continuous skirmish between the Albanian guerrillas and Yugoslavian army. The area included a couple of villages around Junik and the Highlands of Gjakova along the Kosovo border with Albania (back then part of the Prefecture of Kosovo). The zone consisted of the villages Junik, Molliq, Botushë, Brovinë, Ponoshec, Babaj i Bokës, Popoc, Shishman, and Koshare. Beside Junik, the rest correspond today to border villages of the District of Gjakova.

=== Ongoing ===
The area was practically autonomous, ruled by local bayraktars and the Kanun only.
Despite the intention, the area served as a buffer zone for the kachak guerrillas and was a starting point for consecutive Albanian rebellions organized from 1921 to 1924 in Kosovo. Many chetas settled around Junik and launched offensives against the Serbian armies starting from there. Azem Galica and his men settled there, and later Hasan Prishtina also joined. Beside attacks on the Serbian army, the Committee for the National Defence of Kosovo organized insurgencies against the Zog-controlled governments of Tirana, the latest being a sworn enemy of the Committee of Kosovo and Kosovar irredentists. The Committee of Kosovo leaders as Hasan Prishtina, Bajram and Hysni Curri, and Azem Galica initiated more than once attacks against the Albanian armies and authorities stationed nearby. Two main ones were the Albanian Rebellion of 1922, and the other tentative in January 1923. During the last attempt, Beqir Vokshi, a former member of the Committee who resigned and was recently enlisted as an officer of the Albanian army was killed by Galica's men. Vokshi was trying to persuade the population of Junik to not support the recent guerrilla attacks upon the military installments of the Krumë and Tropojë regions. Beqir Vokshi was amongst those who opposed the Kachak Movement in the Neutral Zone of Junik, and on the 21st of January, when Hasan Prishtina invited him to a meeting where he pleaded with him to refrain from supporting Zog and working against the Movement, Beqir declined and left for a meeting with Zog's officials in Krumë the next day.

=== Dissolution ===
In early January 1923, the rebels had taken an offensive over Tropojë, followed by a broader one on Has District. They had surrounded Krumë (center of the Prefecture of Kosovo), attacked the gendarme stations in Nikaj-Mërtur and arrived by the Drin river. The most severe fighting took place near Krumë town, which was attacked from two sides by the guerrillas of Azem Galica and Sadik Rama.
Following the events, Ahmet Zogu ordered a major offensive. After pushing the insurgents back to the Neutral Zone, in late January 1923 the Albanian army entered Junik. The Kachaks left the area and went inside Kosovo. Later, the area was handed over to the Yugoslavs, and a joint-border patrolling was established. The Yugoslav army burned down the houses which had served as kachak basis and executed around 60 people. By February 1923, the Neutral Zone stopped existing.
