= Curri =

Curri is an Albanian surname. Notable people with the surname include:

- Asllan Curri (died 1925), a member of the kachak movement
- Bajram Curri, (1862–1925) Albanian politician
- Debatik Curri (born 1983), Albanian footballer
- Hysni Curri (died 1925), Kosovar Albanian revolutionary
- Skerdilaid Curri (born 1975), Albanian footballer
