= Ismet Bey Kryeziu =

Albanian politician

- Born: 1889; Gjakova, Ottoman Empire (modern Kosovo)
- Died: 1952 (aged 62–63); Albania
- Other names: Ismet Kryeziu

Ismet Bey Kryeziu (1889–1952) was an Albanian political figure during the 1930s and 1940s.

Kryeziu was born in Yakova, Sanjak of İpek, Ottoman Empire in 1889, or 1888. He descended from the well known Kryeziu family (surname means blackhead), landowners and politically influential during the Ottoman rule. He was the nephew of Ali Pasha of Gucia, a prominent member and contributor of the League of Prizren of 1878.

Kryeziu had studied in Istanbul. After World War I, he was elected Assemblyman at the Parliament of Serbia in Belgrade. In 1926, after an assassination attempt and land confiscation from the Yugoslav government, he immigrated to Albania. Kryeziu was a pro-Zogist. He was one of the trusted man of King Ahmed Zog and exercised influence on him. Together with Salih Vuçitërni he was elected from King Zog as the organizers of the Committee of Kosovo. The Committee promoted irredentism and fight against Serbian rule, it had been previously outlawed by Zog during his rise in power of 1924, and had gone quiet after the death of Curri, Pristina, Hoxha Kadri, and other leaders. The newly reorganized Committee was symbolic and its activity was limited to propaganda.

During Zog's regime he served in various prefectures as Berat, Vlora, Durrës, and Korçë. In 1936 he was elected in the Albanian Parliament to represent the Prefecture of Kosovo.

After the Italian invasion, he took a strong nationalistic stance. Kryeziu collaborated with Bedri Pejani and Xhafer Deva, the leaders of the Second League of Prizren, and working for the unification of Albanian populated territories in one state, which outside of Albania is usually referred as Greater Albania. He was elected Minister of the Liberated Areas (Albanian: Ministër i Tokave të Çliruara) in the short-lived government of Eqrem Libohova, 18 January – 11 February 1943, succeeding Tahir Shtylla. He was again elected member of the Parliament in October 1943.

Kryeziu was arrested after the communist victory of November 1944. In April 1945 he was given 30 years of prison by the Special Court like many other political figures of that time, as "a traitor and enemy of the people". He died in prison in 1952.

== See also ==
- Kryeziu Brothers
- German occupation of Albania
- Mustafa Kruja
- Fejzi Alizoti
