= Kachaks =

Albanian rebels against Serbia and Yugoslavia

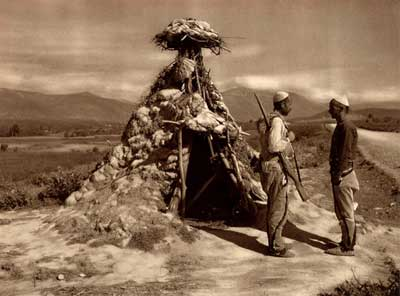
Kosovo Albanian rebels controlling a road in Kosovo, Serbia, 1920s

Kachaks (Albanian: kaçak, Serbian: качаци / kačaci) is a term used for the Albanian rebels active in the late 19th and early 20th century in northern Albania, Montenegro, Serbia and Macedonia, and later as a term for the militias of Albanian revolutionary organizations against the Kingdom of Serbia (1910–18) Kingdom of Yugoslavia (1918–24), called the "Kachak Movement".

== Etymology ==
The word is derived from Ottoman Turkish kaçak for "outlaw", which is derived from kaçmak meaning “run away” or “hide”.

== History ==
=== 1920–24 Kachak movement ===
The Committee for the National Defense of Kosovo (Albanian: Komiteti për Mbrojten Kombëtare të Kosovës) was created in Shkodër, under Hasan Prishtina, in 1918. The committee organizationally and financially supported the kachaks in Albanian-populated areas of Yugoslavia, in Kosovo and Skopje (the former Kosovo vilayet). Kachaks were also active around Ohrid and Bitola. On 6 May 1919 the Committee called for a general uprising in Kosovo and other Albanian-inhabited regions in Yugoslavia. The Kachaks were popular among Albanians, and local support to them increased in the 1920s when Hasan Prishtina became a member of the Albanian parliament, Kadri Prishtina ("Hoxhe Kadriu") became Minister of Justice, and Bajram Curri became Minister of war (1921). All three were Kosovar Albanians.

During this time, Kosovar Albanians under Azem Galica began an armed struggle, also known as the "Kachak movement", a large-scale revolt in Drenica involving around 10,000 people under Galica. The uprising was quelled by the Royal Yugoslav Army. Armed conflicts between the Royal Yugoslav Army and the Kachaks took place in the years 1920 and 1921, 1923, with a revival in 1924. One of the achievements was the creation of the "neutral zone" around Junik, which would serve to jeopardize the frontier and provide ammunition and other logistical support for the Kachaks.

== Legacy ==
They are widely depicted in Albanian folklore. Albanian collaborationists in Yugoslavia during World War II were also sometimes known as Kachaks.

== Notable people ==
- Bajram Curri (1862–1925)
- Azem Galica (1889–1924)
- Qerime Shotë Galica (1895–1927)
- Zef Kol Ndoka (1883–1924)
- Hysni Curri (?–1925)
- Ajet Sopi Bllata (1861–1938)
- Agan Koja (1892–1929)
- Mehmet Pashë Deralla (1843–1918)
- Sali Butka (1852–1938)
- Osman Taka (?–1887)
- Asllan Curri (?–1925)
- Idriz Seferi (1847–1927)
- Bajram Balota (?–?)
- Sadik Rama (1879–1944)
- Isa Boletini (1864–1916)
- Jusuf Mehonjić (1883–1926)
- Xhel Guri (?–1927)
