= Haxhi Rexha Bekteshaj =

Albanian Kachak anti-Yugoslav rebel and activist

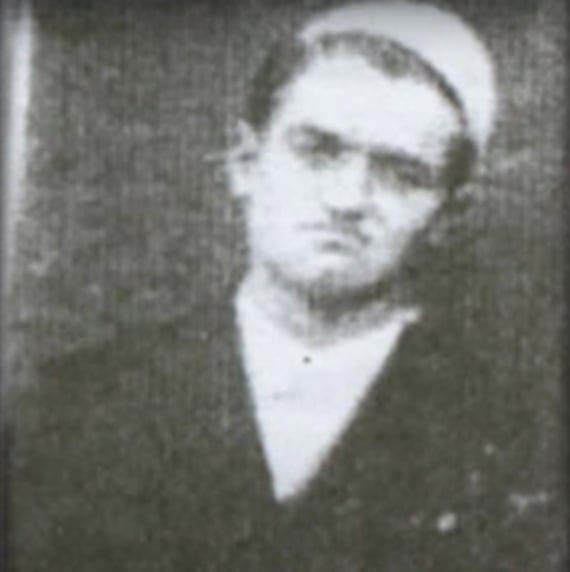
Anti-Yugoslav rebel and political activist

Haxhi Rexhep "Rexha" Bekteshaj (Albanian: Haxhi Rexha Bekteshaj, Serbo-Croatian: Redžo Bektešević/Реџо Бектешевић; d. 1931) was an Albanian Muslim political activist from Gusinje, present-day Montenegro. He was a member of the Committee for the National Defence of Kosovo and fought as kachak against Yugoslav border troops after 1919 when his home region became part of Yugoslavia. He was killed by Yugoslav agents in Lezhë in 1931. In Albanian historiography, he is remembered as “Rexha i Vogel” (Little Rexha).

== Life ==
He was born in Gusinje, most likely around the 1900s, to his father Selman Bekteshaj (Bektešević), who came from the Bekteshaj (Bektešević) brotherhood in Gusinje that descends from the Albanian tribe of Trieshi. He was religious and performed the pilgrimage of Hajj to Mecca and Medina, which earned him the nickname “Haxhia” or “Haxhi.” After Gusinje became part of the Kingdom of Montenegro and the harsh Plav–Gusinje massacres (1912–1913), Rexhep became an outspoken critic of the Montenegrin-Yugoslav authorities. During World War I, Rexhep began collaborating with Ismail Nikoçi, another Albanian anti-Yugoslav political activist, who recognized his special qualities and skills in the political sphere. This cooperation was cut short when Rexhep was arrested by the authorities and imprisoned in Vienna. In 1917, Rexhep became a fugitive, and upon his return from Vienna, he worked as a courier and messenger for Nikoçi. He became a member of the Committee for the National Defence of Kosovo and maintained connections with other delegates and his hometown of Gusinje.

After the murder of Ismail Nikoçi in 1919 and the failure of the Plav revolt, Rexhep returned to Gusinje, where he formed a dangerous anti-Yugoslav Kachak band. This group consisted of local rebels from both Gusinje and Vusanje, including Zog Binaku-Celaj, Bube Binaku-Ulaj, Sadri Keqi, Rame Smajli, Bajram Zeneli, Gal Musliu-Bruncaj, Jakup Hoxha, Meme Shabani, Ali Meta, Bajram Ibra-Gjonbalaj, Pulec Hima, Sadik Xhuka, Dash Rexhepi, Zeqir Smajli-Ahmetaj, Avdi Qosi, Rame Cubi-Vucetaj, and Sokol Sadria Dedushaj. The authorities forcibly arrested Rexhep's wife and two children in an attempt to coerce him into surrendering, but he refused. Alongside the infamous Agan Koja and Hasan Ferri, he fought against the Yugoslav authorities in Plav, stunning their military and police patrols. A notable battle took place in 1920 at Qafa e Godisë in Vermosh, Albania, where, in addition to 20 gendarmes, their leader, Captain Savo Đurašković, was killed.

In May 1924, reports emerged indicating that the Serbian authorities had imprisoned three individuals associated with Rexha Bekteshaj: Sali Ibren from Gusinje, Col Isufi Hasangjekaj, and Sokol Sadria Dedushaj. These individuals were serving as gendarmes for the Principality of Albania at the border. A month later, Rexha Bekteshaj, with the assistance of Ismail Gali and Prelvukaj—who were leading a group of smugglers at the time—collaborated with Rrustem Ademi Ulaj, the commander of the Albanian border post in Grabon. Together, they apprehended several Montenegrin traders returning with contraband tobacco from Shkodra, specifically Millutin Shutin, Peter Lončarević, and another individual. Rexha reportedly stated, "Three for three. Release the three brothers now arrested in Plav, so that these three Yugoslavs can be freed".

The situation escalated into a diplomatic issue, leading to an exchange of numerous diplomatic notes and mutual accusations between the government of Nikola Pašić and the government of Tirana. Eventually, with the intervention of Rexhep Shala, commander of the III Group of the Albanian Army based in Shkodra, a resolution was reached. However, the actions of the Albanian authorities in Shkodra, instigated by Rexha Bekteshaj, ultimately resulted in significant consequences for Rrustem Ademi, the Vuthian gendarme. He was eliminated by his superior, who had been bribed by the Montenegrin traders, Captain Vas Kiri.

The Yugoslav mayor of Plav, Novica Popović, set a bounty of 20,000 dinars for the elimination of Rexhep Bekteshaj, just as he had targeted many other individuals such as Agan Koja and Ismail Nikoçi towards the end of the 1920s. Rexhep was eventually assassinated on November 24, 1931, in Lezhë, Albania, by a local paid assassin. According to reports, this assassin was later executed by the local population for treason. His murder was reported by the Tirana newspaper "Ora" in its issue 480 dated November 24, 1931, where "Rexha i Vogel" was portrayed as a hero of the Albanian people and among the fallen fighters against the Yugoslav occupation.

== Sources ==
- Dedushaj, Rexhep (2012). 100 Vjet Luftë [100 years of war]. New York. OCLC 50395993.
- Dedushaj, Rexhep (1993). Krahina e Plavë-Gucisë nëpër shekuj [The region of Plav-Gusinje throughout the centuries]. New York. OCLC 43026372.
- Jokanović, Miljan (1995). Pleme Kuči Etnička Istorija (The Kuči Tribe: Ethnic History). Belgrade.
- Erdeljanović, Jovan (1981). Kuči, Bratonožići i Piperi (The Tribes of Kuči, Bratonožić and Piperi). Slovo Ljubve. OCLC 1284777645.
