= Begolli family =

Albanian noble family

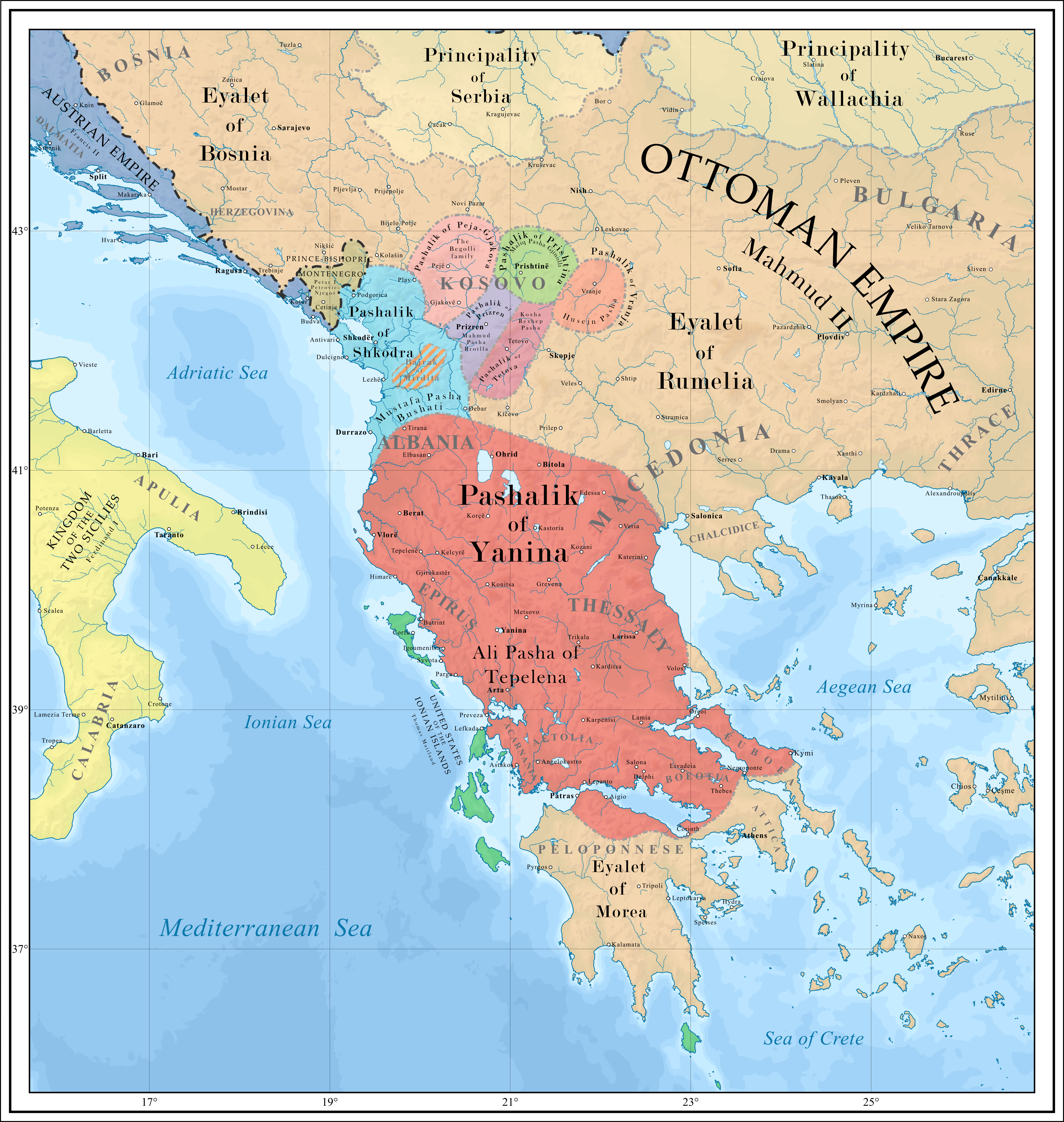
Areas under the Begolli family, 1815-1821.

The Begolli family is an Albanian noble family, which rose to prominence in present-day Kosovo in the Ottoman era and were an influential feudal family in the region.

== History ==
The Begolli were influential in Rrafshi i Dukagjinit area, Plav-Gusinje, and down to Shkodër. They were landowners and held private armies.

Their first known member may have been Mere Hüseyin Pasha, Grand Vizier of the Ottoman Empire in the 17th century.

== Notable members ==
- Qerim Begolli, delegate at Assembly of Vlora and Albanian Congress of Trieste.
- Qazim Begolli, activist of kachak movement, member of Committee for the National Defence of Kosovo.
- Refat Begolli, politician, Albanian Minister of Economy of Ibrahim Biçakçiu's cabinet (7 September – 25 October 1944).
- Faruk Begolli (1944–2007), Albanian actor and director.
- Mahmut Pasha of Begolli, Ottoman-Albanian governor and military commander
- Numan Pasha Begolli, the son of Kahraman Pasha Begolli and the Governor of Dukagjin. Built between 1805-1806 the first public library in Pejë, named Bolla-zade Library.

== See also ==
- Vrioni family
