= Salih Vuçitërni =

Albanian politician

Salih bej Vuçitërni
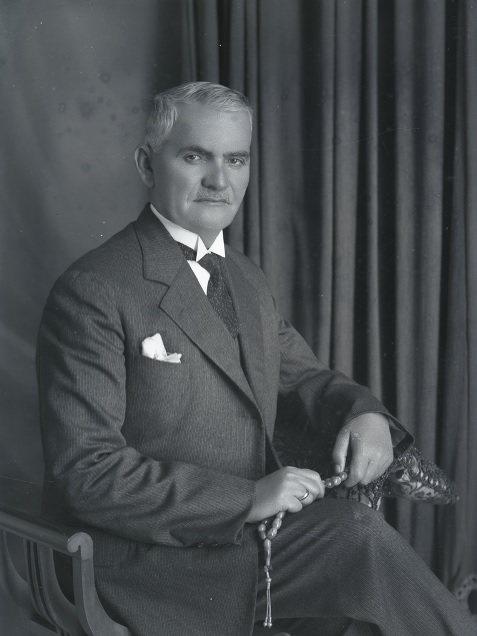
- Born: April 8, 1880; Vıçıtırın, Ottoman Empire
- Died: October 1949; Albania
- Other names: Salih Vuçitërni
- Known for: Evliya Çelebi's work translation into Albanian; Minister of Public Works (1928-1930)

Salih bej Vuçitërni (8 April 1880 - October 1949) was an Albanian political figure and royalist.

== Life ==
Vuçitërni was born in Vıçıtırın, Vilayet of Kosovo, Ottoman Empire on 8 April 1880. He descended from a Bosnian landowning family. Initially he served as town's hodja. In 1920 he moved to Albania and served as vice-prefect of Tirana. From 1921 to 1925 he served as Assemblyman of the Albanian Parliament representing the region of Dibra. From 1925 to 1928 he was a member of the Senate.

In February 1927, following the review that showed disorder and confusion at the Albanian vakf where he was an administrator, and the failure of the reform on the medreses, Vuçitërni called for a reform on the charity institutions. The call led to controversies.

From May 1928 to 1930 he served as Minister of Public Works (Albanian: Ministër i Punëve Botore) in the government of Kostaq Kota. During the term he was investigated for corruption. From 1928 to 1932 he was elected again in the Albanian Parliament.

He was one of the two trusted men of Ahmet Zogu for reviving the Committee of Kosovo together with Ismet Bey Kryeziu of Gjakova. Once Zogu's strong opponents as Bajram Curri and Hasan Prishtina were gone and Albania was leaning towards Italy, King Zog decided to revive and finance the organization keeping connections with few pro-Zog irredentists within Kosovo. Nevertheless, the activity of the Committee of Kosovo at that time would be mainly propagandistic.
Vuçitërni was elected as head of a governmental committee responsible for an Agrarian Reform in Albania, a committee which practically did not accomplish anything important beside assisting Kosovar families which were abandoning Kosovo to settle in agrarian areas of central Albania. In 1939 he was elected by the Italians as Director of SITA, and Italian company responsible for electrical energy and logistics, replacing Qemal Vrioni. In 1942 Vuçitërni would serve as manager of the properties of the Muslim Community in Albania.

He would be arrested by the Albanian communists in late 1944 and sentenced as war criminal and collaborationist.

== Work ==
Vuçitërni wrote a panegyric booklet called Pikla t'arta heroizmi nga jeta e mbretit dhe nanës mbretneshë (Golden drops of heroism from the life of the king and queen mother), Tirana, 1937.
The most important work left from him were the translation of Evliya Çelebi Seyahatname from Ottoman Turkish.

== See also ==
- Ceno Bey Kryeziu
- Hasan Prishtina
