= Zef Kol Ndoka =

Albanian military commander (1883–1924)

- Born: c.1883 Moglic, Gjakova, Ottoman Empire (present day Kosovo)
- Died: 1924; Has (region), present day Albania
- Other names: Zefi i Vogel, Zef Mirdita
- Occupations: Captain and fighter
- Years active: 1912–1924

Zef Kol Ndoka (1883–1924), also known among Albanians as Zefi I Vogël, was an Albanian warrior and commander from the Shengji family from today's Fan Mirdita in Northern Albania.

== Life ==
Born in 1883 in Moglic, near Gjakova, he grew up fighting against the Ottoman Empire during the Albanian National Awakening in 1912 and continued to fight for the liberation of Kosovo against Serbo-Montenegrin forces in the 1920s. Ndoka fought together with Isa Boletini, Bajram Curri, Hasan Prishtina and others who, alongside them, was a leader of the Albanian Revolt of 1912 that captured Usküb (modern Skopje). Ndoka, along with Mehmet Shpendi and Bajram Daklani, raised the Albanian flag in Skopje on 12 August 1912. After the Albanian independence of 1912 his group he immediately began fighting the Kingdom of Yugoslavia together with Bajram Curri in order to unite Kosovo with Albania. Zefi was shot and killed in 1924 after an argument with Azem Galica, in the neutral zone of Junik.

Zefi was one of key figures for the gathering of the Albanian highlanders of Gjakova and Mirdita against the Ottoman Empire. Today, he is a venerated figure in the Mirdita region.
