= Asllan Curri =

Albanian insurgent (died 1925)

Asllan Curri (?-1925) was a member of the kachak movement in early 20th century in Kosovo and North Albania.

Asllan Curri was the nephew of Bajram Curri, a prominent kachak leader from the Highlands of Djakovica, part of the Krasniqi tribe. Curri was sent by Bajram Curri to the Normal School of Elbasan (today's Aleksandër Xhuvani University) together with other 50 Kosovar fellows.
He was member and main activist of the Committee for the National Defence of Kosovo with headquarters in Shkoder. He would serve as Bajram Curri's right hand.
In late April 1925, he was captured by the gendarmes of Ceno Kryeziu, brother-in-law and trusted man of Ahmet Zogu, who from his side was a sworn enemy of the Kosovar irredentist and the Committee of Kosovo. During his transfer to the prison, Kryeziu's man executed him with the pretext of having tried to escape, as it was a common practice for him. This was confirmed by the La Feeration Balkanique, published by the Balkan Federation of 30 April 1925.

== See also ==
- Hysni Curri
- Azem Galica
