= Rexha =

Rexha is a surname of Albanian origin. Notable people with this name include:

- Bebe Rexha (born 1989), American singer and songwriter
- Ekrem Rexha (1961–2000), commander in the Kosovo Liberation Army
- Fitnete Rexha (1933–2003), Albanian folk singer
- Haxhi Rexha Bekteshaj (died 1931), Albanian militant

== Footballers ==
- Agnesa Rexha (born 1994), Kosovar footballer, plays for Mitrovica and Kosovo
- Ervin Rexha (born 1991), Albanian footballer, has played for Albanian and German clubs
- Kastriot Rexha (born 1988), Kosovar footballer, mostly played for Kosovan clubs

== See also ==
- Kënga e Rexhës, a ballet whose title means Rexha's song
- Syle Rexha Tower House, cultural heritage monument in Peja, Kosovo
