= Qazim Begolli =

Albanian activist

Qazim Begolli was an Albanian nationalist and activist of the Kachak movement of 20th century.

== Activity ==
Begolli was member of powerful and influential Begolli family from İpek. They were the first sanjak-beys in the area Shkodër-Dukagjin (Metohije).

Qazim Begolli was active during the World War I and after. With Hasan Prishtina and others he organized insurgencies and attacks against the Serbian forces stationed in Kosovo. In February 1915 he participated in the Battle of Zhur near Prizren. In May 1918, Begolli had been arrested and convicted for "Public Indecency". He was sentenced to Six Months in prison.

He was a founding member of the Committee for the National Defence of Kosovo, a committee based in Shkodër and founded in November 1918. The committee brought the kachak movement and the Albanian resistance against Serbia to the highest levels.

== See also ==
- Qerim Bey Begolli
