= Begolli =

Begolli is a surname. Notable people with the surname include:

- Faruk Begolli (1944–2007), Yugoslavian and Kosovan actor
- Lavdie Begolli (born 1993), Kosovan-born Albanian footballer
- Qazim Begolli (fl. 1910s), Albanian nationalist and activist
