= Kadri Prishtina =

Albanian politician (1878–1925)

Hoxha Kadri
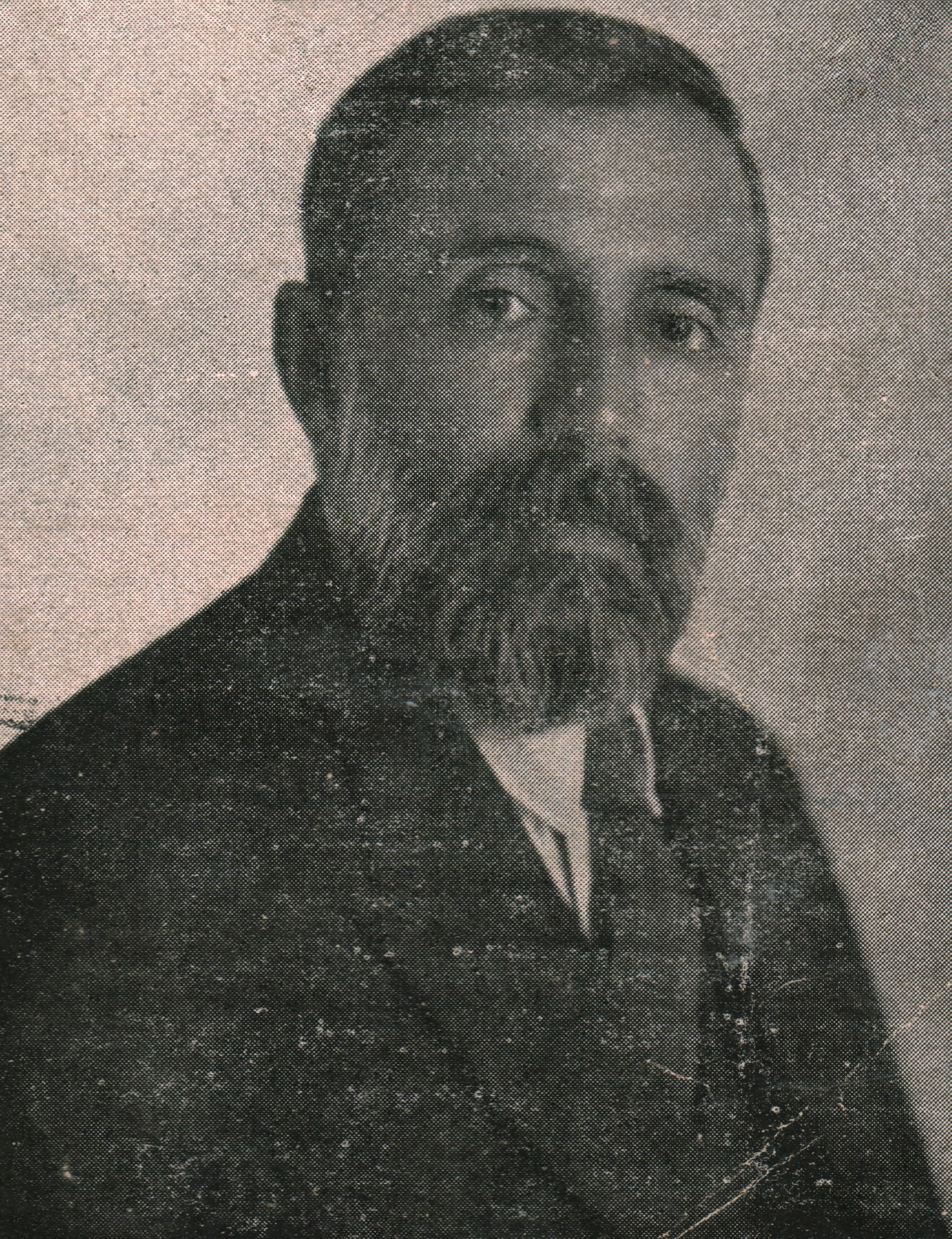
- Born: Kadri Prishtina; 1878; Pristina, Kosovo Vilayet, Ottoman Empire
- Died: January 20, 1925 (aged 46–47); Shkodër, Albania
- Other name: Kadri Lutfullah Prishtina
- Occupations: Lawyer, politician, publisher
- Known for: Committee of Kosovo

Kadri Prishtina (1878 – 20 January 1925), better known as Hoxha Kadri, was an Albanian political figure of the early 1920s.

== Life ==
Hoxha Kadri was born in Pristina, in the Kosovo Vilayet of the Ottoman Empire. He took the first studies in his home town in Turkish language, studying later in Uskub school "Dar ul-Mualimin". He studied law and education in Istanbul, first in the Private Pegagogical Schools "Darüttedris" and later in the "Fatih" Medrese. On February 4, 1902 he joined the Young Turks movement. In 1904 he was arrested by Ottoman authorities because of his refusals to point to the author of "Fitret ul-Islâm", a problematic and controversial essay on the Islam religion, with Syrja Bey Vlora as author. He spent four years in Yedikule prison where he lost a leg due to gangrene. After his released he was interned in Tokat in north-eastern Anatolia where he worked as a lawyer. With the Young Turk Revolution of 1908 his persecution ended and he was sent in Samsun by the Black Sea to finish his studies. In 1911 he became professor of law, and was appointed in 1913 to work at the Bank of Istanbul, after that being expelled from Turkey.
During World War I he was stationed in Shkodër, north-west Albanian town. He formed there an organization called "Komiteti i Fshehtë" (Secret Committee) with a nationalistic programme.
He was one of the founders of the Committee for the National Defence of Kosovo, and was officially its leader for the time it operated based on Shkodër. Prishtina would be also in charge of representing the Committee in meetings and keeping correspondence for foreign factors. His deputy was Hysni Curri, and Bedri Pejani served as Committee's secretary.

He was appointed Minister of Justice of the Albanian government coming out of the Congress of Lushnjë. In 1921 he was Deputy Chairman of the Albanian Parliament. In December 1921 he was again appointed Minister of Justice of the short-lived government of Hasan Prishtina.

Several schools and streets in Albania and Kosovo bear his name.

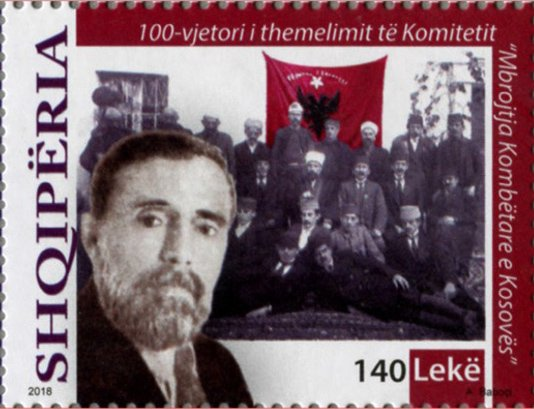
Prishtina on a 2018 stamp of Albania

== As a publisher ==
In 1921, Prishtina published in Shkodër the newspaper Udha e së Vërtetës (Road of the truth). The newspaper served the Committee for the National Defence of Kosovo as well, after the Populli (The people) newspaper of Sali Nivica and Bedri Pejani was closed.

== See also ==
- Bajram Curri
