= Jusuf Mehonjić =

Albanian revolutionary (1883–1926)

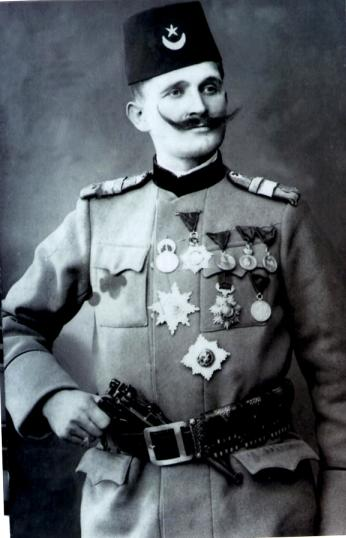
Jusuf Mehonjić/Mehonja during his time as an Ottoman soldier

Jusuf Mehonjić (Albanian: Jusuf Mehonja or Isuf Mehani) (1883-1926) was an Albanian leader of the Kachak Movement and a member of the Committee of Kosovo from Šahovići.

He fought in the Ottoman Army until 1912. During occupation of Serbia in World War One Mehonjić committed a few crimes, so he became an outlaw in 1918. In 1922 Yugoslav authorities sent Chetniks under command of Kosta Pećanac to hunt down Mehonjić after failed assassination attempt of prominent member of People's Radical Party. Chetniks killed 28 Muslim villagers in Starčevići near Tutin. Later they were defeated by Mehonjić's men near Sjenica, which gave him heroic status among the populace. In the period of 1924-1928, he was as an anti-Yugoslav rebel leader of the Kachak movements chetas (armed bands) (çetë) in the lower Sandžak area, including Novi Pazar, Rožaje, Sjenica, Kolašin and Bihor. Other leaders included Husein Boshko, Feriz Sallku and Rek Bisheva. His units mostly attacked Serbs, both soldiers and gendarmes, as well as civilians, traders and peasants.

In 1924, Mehonjić/Mehonja was framed for organizing the murder of Boško Bošković, the chief of Kolašin county, despite him being in Albania at the time. This was used as a pretext for the 1924 Šahovići massacre, in which around 600-900 local Muslims were massacred by Montenegrin peasants. Afterwards, it emerged that the murderers of Bošković were clan members from Rovca, a rival tribe to his own.

He was a member of the Committee for the National Defence of Kosovo, and according to Professor Matija Murko of Prague, Mehonjic was also a writer of poetry, writing and singing about the battles and skirmishes he had fought. These songs were confiscated by Yugoslav authorities. Mehonja died in 1926. He is buried in Albania next to his wife Naze. According to one source he was betrayed and killed by his concealer and that Yugoslav Intelligence Service was involved in his death.
