= Sali Nivica =

Albanian politician and journalist (1890–1920)

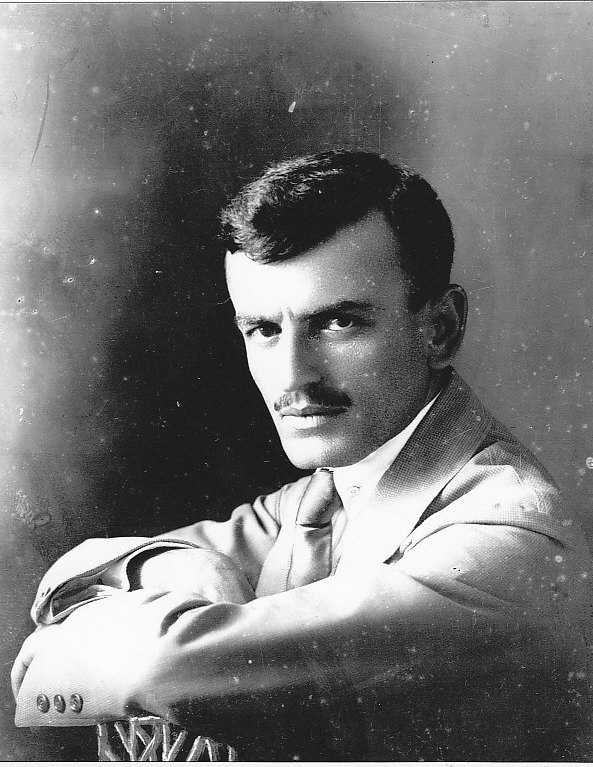
- Born: Sali Asllani; May 15, 1890; Rexhin, Vilayet of Yannina, Ottoman Empire (modern Albania)
- Died: January 10, 1920 (aged 29); Shkodër, Principality of Albania
- Cause of death: Assassination by gunshots
- Other name: Sali Nivitza
- Occupations: Journalist, teacher, politician
- Known for: K.M.K.K; Populli newspaper
- Awards: Honor of the Nation

Sali Nivica or Sali Nivitza (May 15, 1890 – January 10, 1920) was a politician, a patriot, an Albanian journalist and a teacher. For his patriotic activity he received the highest Albanian award, 'Honor of the Nation' as well as that of 'Teacher of the People'. He was assassinated in 1920 at aged 29.

== Life ==
Nivica was born in Rexhin village in the southern Ottoman Albania, today's Tepelenë. He went to school in Monastir (1904–1907) where he was inspired by the rebel Bajo Topulli. After that he went in Yannina where he joined the Greek-language Zosimea school (1907–09). He went in Durrës to teach there for a short time (1909–10). During this time he was increasingly caught up by the Albanian nationalist movement. During 1911–12 he was involved with anti-Ottoman activities and uprisings in southern Albania. For that he would be arrested and imprisoned in Istanbul. However, he was soon released with the intervention of Ismail Bey Vlora and managed to arrange himself to teach Albanian at the Robert College.

Nivica returned to Albania after independence and together with Mustafa Hilmi Leskoviku (1887–1915), also known as Muço Qulli, he funded the newspaper Populli ("The people") in Vlorë (1914) and shortly moved to Shkodër. The end of World War I would find him there.

Nivica was a member of the National Literature Organization, and the Committee for the National Defence of Kosovo (CNDS) until his death. He continued as the editor-in-chief of the Albanian patriotic newspaper Populli restarted in early 1919. It was published in Shkodër, with strong nationalistic notes supporting the Committee for the National Defence of Kosovo. The first issue came out on January 18, 1919, with the slogan "Për lavdinë e Atdheut" ("For the glory of the nation"). It served somehow as a de facto journal of the committee. During all its activity the newspaper propagandized Albanian ethnic unity, the Albanian national cause, and called for the liberation of Kosovo from the Serbs.

== Death ==
His nationalistic activity would aggravate his relationship with neighboring countries, especially with Italy which had most of Albania under protectorate. He was killed in Shkodër by a gunman named Kolë Ashiku, Sejfi Vllamasi gives more insight on his assassination. Nivica and Ashiku got angry with each other due to a store-renting business negotiation which did not go well, following with Nivica insulting the counterpart. Ashiku declared that he would resolve things according to the Kanun. His brother Andon, a Catholic priest, notified Hysni Curri (a leader of the committee) that Ashiku was serious. Both Curri and Nivica neglected the severity of the situation. Though Curri assigned a guard to follow Nivica, Ashiku found him alone in one of the side streets of the town and shot him twice. Nivica managed to fire four shots towards Ashiku, who ran and entered the Italian consulate. Nivica died later in the hospital, to the great delight of the Italians.

=== Funeral ===
The day of his funeral the whole town closed the store in his respect. His funeral was attended by a large number of people.

== See also ==
- Italian expeditionary corps in Albania (World War I)
