= Ramo Kolenović =

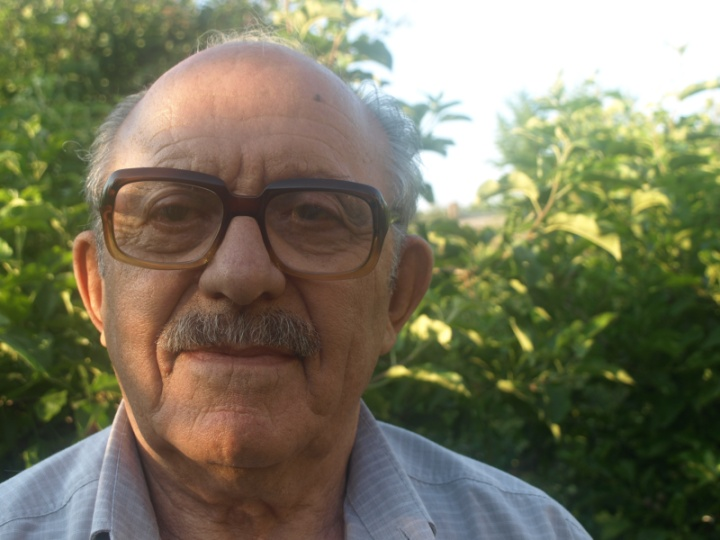
- Born: 7 August 1927; Gusinje, Montenegro
- Died: 2015 (aged 87–88)
- Known for: Kayaking

Ramo Kolenović (7 August 1927-2015) was a Montenegrin kayaker. He is a member of Kayak club Zmaj, Zemun. He lived in Zemun, Serbia. He won the most medals in former Yugoslavia.

== International successes ==
=== Yugoslavian champions ===
K-1 10000 m

1st place: 1956, 1959
2nd place: 1954, 1957, 1958, 1961, 1964
3rd place: 1960, 1963

K-2 10000 m

1st place: 1961
2nd place: 1962

K-4 10000 m

2nd place: 1964

K-1 1000 m

2nd place: 1958

K-4 1000 m

1st place: 1960, 1962

K-1 500 m

2nd place: 1958

K-1 4x500 m

1st place: 1963
2nd place: 1959, 1961, 1963
3rd place: 1960

=== International champions ===
- 1954 – Kayak-canoe international contest in Zemun, Serbia
  - bronze medal for 10000 meters
- 1956 – Kayak-canoe international contest in London
  - bronze medal for 10000 meters
- 1956 – Kayak-canoe international contest in Brčko, Bosnia and Herzegovina
  - silver medal for 10000 meters
- 1960 – Kayak-canoe international contest in Brčko, Bosnia and Herzegovina
  - gold medal for 10000 meters

== Gallery ==
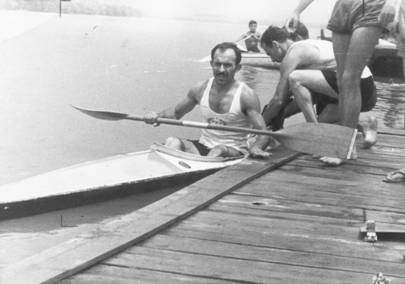
Kolenović in Jajce, Bosnia and Herzegovina in 1963

Kolenović with Mirko Nišović in 1986
