= Sadik Rama =

Albanian insurgent (1879–1944)

Sadik Rama (1879 – 1944) was a Kosovo Albanian kaçak guerrilla fighter who fought against the Serbian annexation of Kosovo in 1912. Following the Ottoman defeat, he continued to participate along Isa Boletini and Bajram Curri in the national revolt of 1913–14 in Llapushe. He joined the kaçak guerrillas in 1919 with support from the Committee for the National Defence of Kosovo. He fought alongside Azem Bejta during his lifetime.

== Family ==
Rama was born in Gjurgjevik i Madh, now known as Martiras, located in Klina, Kosovo. He was a distant descendant of the Gjonbalaj brotherhood of Vuthaj of Kelmendi. His son, Ukë Sadiku (Rama) was active against the Italian administration in Kosovo. At the end of the war he was a member of the Albanian National Democratic Movement (LNDSH). The LNDSH didn't surrender to the Yugoslav Partisans and fought them in western Kosovo. He was captured, tried and executed in 1945 with Gjon Serreqi, leader of LNDSH. Fadil Hoxha, Yugoslav party boss in Kosovo writes in his memoirs that in 1943 he made contact with Ukë Sadiku and tried to recruit him to the Partisans but he refused the offer.

== Military activity ==
In 1899, Sadik Rama, along with other fighters, participated in the National front of Peja, at the kulla of Haxhi Zeka. During the revolts of 1906–08 against the Ottomans. They continued to fight in 1912 against Serbo-Montenegrin forces, as well as against Italians in the 1920s. Rama played a major role in the Albanian national cause together with Hasan Prishtina. The prime minister of Serbia, Nikola Pašić, planned to end the Albanian revolts and sent large sums of money to Rama, asking him to surrender to which he refused. Serbian-Montenegrin forces eventually began attacking villages in Kosovo and massacred many Albanian civilians in 1919. At the start of World War II, he moved to Albania where he died in 1944.

== Legacy ==
The Rama family is hailed as a symbol of Albanian resistance against Serbian and Yugoslav oppression in Kosovo. In 1998, the kulla (tower) of the Rama family was reconstructed.

== Sources ==
=== Bibliography ===
- Çetta, Anton (1981). Kërkime folklorike. University of Michigan: Rilindja, Biblioteka Etnos.
- Hoxha, Fadil (1965). Kur pranvera vonohet: (Fragment nga ditari-1943). Rilindja.
