= Ismail Nikoçi =

Albanian political activist

Ismail Nikoçi (1876–1919) was an Albanian political activist from Gucia (now, Gusinje) in present-day Montenegro and mayor of that town. He played a significant role in the defense of the national rights of the Albanian ethnic community in Plava-Gucia in the period from its annexation to Montenegro in the Balkans Wars to its final annexation to Yugoslavia in 1919.

He was born in 1876 in the town of Gucia. His father Ferhat Nikoçi had fought alongside Ali Pasha of Gucia in the defense of the region against the Montenegrin army. Ismail Nikoçi studied law in Salonica. In the Albanian revolt of 1910, he fought under the leadership of Hasan Ferri against Turgut Pasha. He was imprisoned for his participation in the revolt.

In the First Balkan War, Montenegro again attacked the region and on 19 October the Montenegrin army entered Plav. A day later, on 20 October they entered Gucia. One of the first acts of the military administration was to imprison in Nikšić 323 important local figures including Ismail Nikoçi. The international uproar against the campaign of killings and forced religious conversion of the Montenegrin army led to their release. In WWI, the Austro-Hungarian administration of the region after Montenegrin capitulation, removed him from the position of mayor of Gusinje in order to satisfy the requests of the Montenegrin political administration and because of his opposition to forced recruitment of local youth. The Austro-Hungarian army then interned him in Hungary until its capitulation in 1918. Upon his release, he assumed again the position of mayor in Gucia and joined the Committee for the National Defence of Kosovo. The organization fought against the annexation of Albanian regions of the former Ottoman Empire by Yugoslavia. The Serbian army attacked the region in February 1919 to annex it. Ismail Nikoçi in his capacity as mayor of Gusinje sent a formal report to the British Military Mission in Albania which was stationed in Shkodër (ca. 100 km to the southwest of his home region) and protested about the killing of over 200 civilians by the Serbian troops. Luigj Gurakuqi and Hasan Prishtina tried to raise awareness for the events in Plava-Gucia in the League of Nations. Nikoçi personally travelled to Shkodër to engage with the Entente Military Missions that were stationed in the city, which had been flooded by refugees from Plava-Gucia. His entry into Shkodër was refused by international missions who held the administration of the city. In September 1919, at a meeting with the French consul, he was pressured to convince the refugees in Shkodër to return to Plava-Gucia and accept Yugoslav rule. Nikoçi refused and continued to protest to the international missions in Shkodër. It was in one of the meetings with the French consul that he made the comment Shqipnija nuk ka miq ("Albania has no friends"). He was assassinated by the end of October 1919 in Shkodër by a Yugoslav Serb agent.

== See also ==
- Agan Koja, a local political activist from Plav

== Sources ==
- Dedushaj, Rexhep (1993). Krahina e Plavë-Gucisë nëpër shekuj [The region of Plav-Gusinje throughout the centuries]. New York. OCLC 43026372.
- Elsie, Robert; Destani, Bejtullah (2018). Elsie, Robert; Destani, Bejtullah (eds.). Kosovo, A Documentary History: From the Balkan Wars to World War II. Bloomsbury Publishing. ISBN 978-1786733542.
- Verli, Marenglen (2006). Nga Kosova për Kosovën: profile biografike personalitetesh dhe luftëtarësh të shquar : studime, skica, publicistikë, dokumente, ilustrime. Botimpex. ISBN 9994380117.
- Verli, Marenglen (2007). Shqipëria dhe Kosova: historia e një aspirate (studiume historike, kumtesa, dokumente dhe ilustrime). Botimpex. ISBN 978-9994380145.
