= Prnjavor, Plav =

Prnjavor Прњавор
- Village
- Location within Montenegro
- Coordinates: 42.598091°N 19.951321°E
- Country: Montenegro
- Municipality: Plav

Population (2011)
  - Total: 961
- Time zone: UTC+1 (CET)
  - Summer (DST): UTC+2 (CEST)

Prnjavor (Serbian Cyrillic: Прњавор; Albanian: Përnjavori) is a village in the municipality of Plav, Montenegro.

== Demographics ==
According to the 2011 census, its population was 961.

Ethnicity in 2011
Ethnicity	Number	Percentage
Bosniaks	901	93.8%
Montenegrins	15	1.6%
other/undeclared	45	4.7%
Total	961	100%

== Notable people ==
- Agan Koja, local imam and political activist
