= Gusinje =

Town and municipality in Northern Montenegro

Gusinje Гусиње Gucia
- Town and municipality
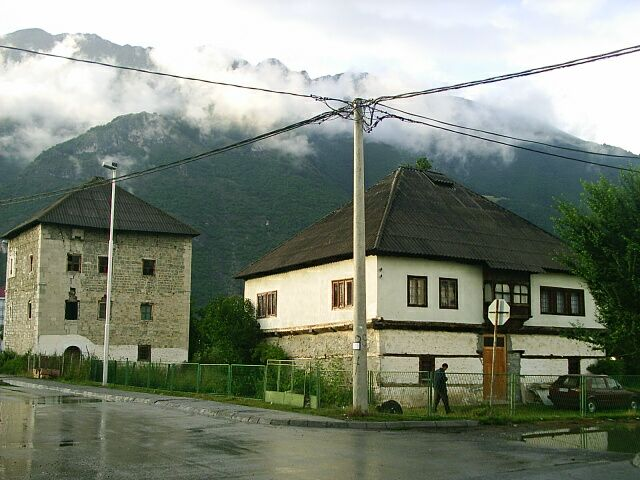
- Typical households in Gusinje

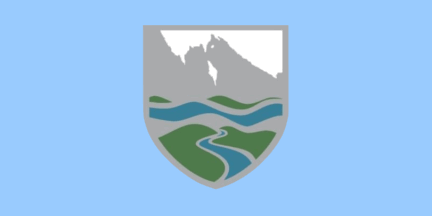
- Flag Coat of arms

- Location within Montenegro
- Coordinates: 42°33′43″N 19°50′02″E
- Country: Montenegro
- Region: Northern
- Municipality: Gusinje

Government
  - Type: Mayor-Assembly
  - Mayor: Sanel Balić (BS)

Area
  - Total: 3.73 km^{2} (1.44 sq mi)
- Elevation: 1,014 m (3,327 ft)

Population (2011)
  - Total: 1,673
- Time zone: UTC+1 (CET)
  - Summer (DST): UTC+2 (CEST)
- Vehicle registration: GS
- Climate: Cfb

Gusinje (Montenegrin Cyrillic: Гусиње, pronounced [ɡǔsiɲe]; Albanian: Gucia) is a small town in Montenegro in the Northern Region. According to the 2011 census, the town has a population of 1,673 and is the administrative center of Gusinje Municipality.

== Name ==
Two alternative etymologies have been proposed for the toponym Gusinje. One links it to Slavic guska (goose), the other to the Illyrian term Geusiae from which the Albanian name of the town, Guci(a), would have evolved. In archival records, it has been recorded variably as Gousino (Гоусино), Gustigne (1614) in Venetian archives, Gusna (گوسن) and Gusinye in Ottoman Turkish.

== Geography ==
The town is located in the Plav-Gusinje area, part of the upper Lim valley in the Accursed Mountains range at an elevation of 1,014 m. Zla Kolata, the highest mountain in Montenegro, is about 10 km south of Gusinje in the Prokletije National Park.

Gusinje is on the Vermosh River, which flows eastwards towards Plav. About 2 km south of Gusinje's center is the source of Vruja creek, Ali Pasha's springs (Alipašini izvori/Krojet e Ali Pashës). Vruja creek enters the Vermosh east of town, between this confluence and Plav is locally called Luca. Just before the Vermosh reaches Plav it flows into Lake Plav. The Vermosh is the first tributary of the Lim river.

Gusinje is the seat of the municipality of the same name. From 1953 to 2014, it was part of Plav Municipality. In 2014, it became again a distinct municipality. The town's boundaries form ~3.73 km^{2} of the total 157 km^{2} of the municipality. Much of the area of the municipality is mountainous land used in the past for livestock herding.

== History ==
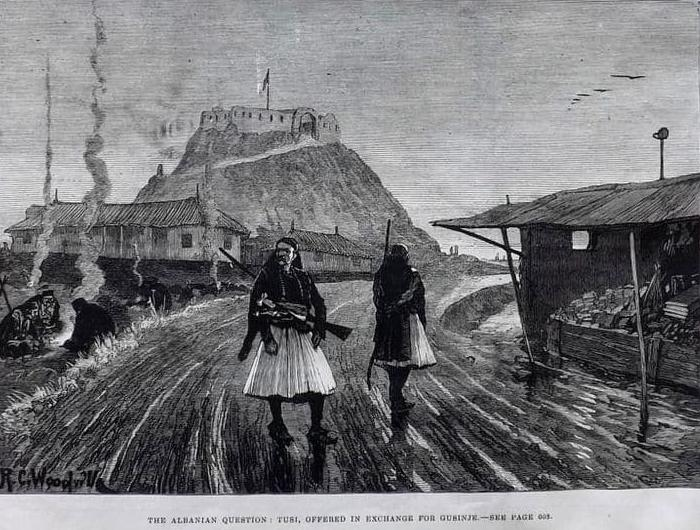
The Albanian Question: Tusi, offered in exchange for Gusinje, engraving published in the Illustrated London News, 1880

The toponym Hotina Gora (mountains of Hoti) in the Plav and Gusinje regions on the Lim river basin in 1330 is the first mention of the Hoti name in historical records in the chrysobulls of Dečani. Šufflay considers this region as the original area of settlement of Hoti from which they moved southwards.

It is known that a medieval settlement was located in the territory of present-day Gusinje. Gusinje was mentioned as a caravan station on the Ragusa-Cattaro–Scutari–Peć route, in the 14th century. In historical record, Gusinje appears in 1485 in the defter of the sanjak of Scutari as a village in the vilayet of Plav, a hass-ı hümayun (imperial domain) that stood directly under the Ottoman Sultan. It had 96 households, 21 unmarried men and four widows. This was a big settlement compared to other villages in Montenegro and northern Albania.

In oral tradition, the Nikaj are said to have replaced the Mavriqi when moving in to their modern territory. They were said to have steemed from Vajush near Shkodër settling in the mountain of Nikaj in the period of 1416-1500. With this most of the Mavriqi emigrated to the area of Gusinje.

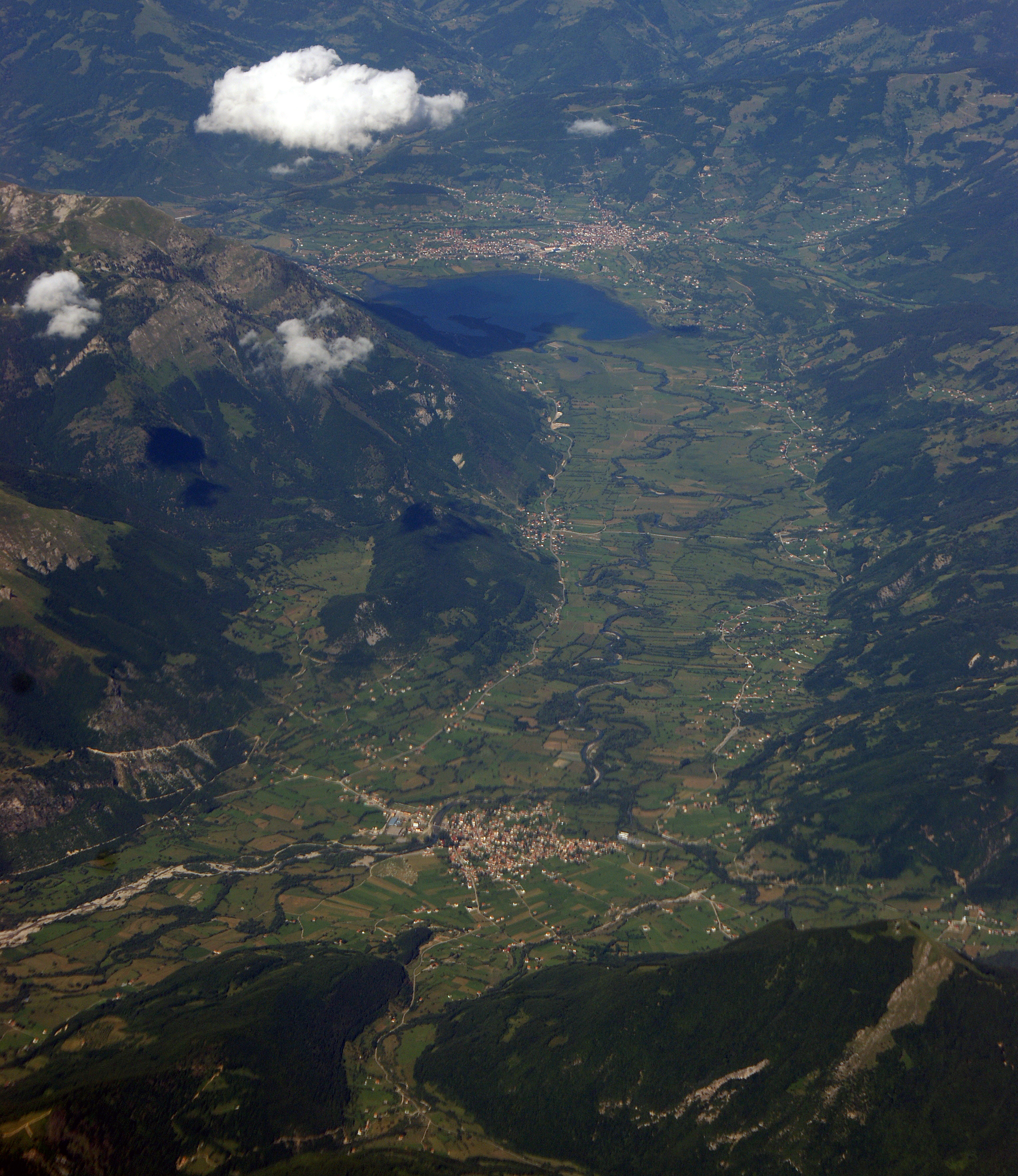
Towns of Gusinje (front) and Plav (background), aerial view.

Gusinje stood at the intersection of the Ottoman trade routes between northern Albania, Montenegro and Kosovo. Thus, the trade that passed through Gusinje generated much wealth for the Sultan and the Ottoman officials who were granted taxing rights. This made the trade route a constant target for the Albanian tribal community (fis) of Kelmendi, which lived along the route as they were in rebellion against the Ottomans and were plundering their trade routes. Venetian diplomat Mariano Bolizza who travelled in the region reported that at the end of 1612 the building of the fortress of Gusinje - near which the modern town developed - was completed. The location was chosen because it stands at the convergence of pathways from Kelmendi. The original location of the fort was near the village of Grnčar/Gërnçar. Modern Gusinje stands ~6 km to the west and ~10 km to the north of the routes from the Kelmendi mountains (malet e Kelmendit) to modern Sandžak. The surrounding villages to the west and south (Vusanje) are Kelmendi settlements. The fortress was built at the request of Sem Zaus, the Ottoman bey of Podgorica who wanted to stop the attacks of Kelmendi and to be able to travel freely in his domain. In 1614, Mariano Bolizza reported that the village had 100 households and a garrison of 237 men under Belo Juvanin. The fortress was also designed to stop the movement of the Kuči and Triepshi tribes in the Upper Lim valley.

In time despite Ottoman expeditions and relocations of these communities in Sandzak, Kelmendi and other tribes like Kuči, Triepshi and Shala came to form many of the historical neighbourhoods (mahalla) of Gusinje of today. Their descendants although initially Christian, willingly or forcefully converted to Islam, largely by the middle 18th century. This conversion occurred as a way to obtain more rights since the Muslim population was more privileged than the Christian one. An important family - which later developed into a brotherhood - in the development of Gusinje is that of the Omeragaj (today known as Omeragić) from Shala who appeared in the village in the early 18th century . The different mosques of Gusinje today represent the different brotherhoods that built them. For example, the Cekaj mosque (Čekića džamija/xhamia e Cekajve) was built by the Cekaj brotherhood from Triepshi in 1687, while the New Mosque built in 1899 is known as Radončića after the Radončići brotherhood from Kuči. At the beginning of the 18th century, Gusinje was the seat of the local kadiluk. In terms of military administration, the captaincy of Gusinje was part of the Bosnia Eyalet in 1724. Central Ottoman administration collapsed in the decades to come and the Pashalik of Shkodra emerged as a regional power. The Vezir's mosque, built by Kara Mahmud Bushati in 1765 in the town center is a symbol of the Pashalik's influence in the upper Lim valley. Its downfall in 1831 brought back actual Ottoman rule. In 1852, in the register of the Kosovo Vilayet, Gusinje is recorded with 1,500 households. It was a developing town that had 350 shops, eight madrasas and five mosques. The captaincy of Gusinje in 1869 was part of the sanjak of Prizren.

The two strongest feudal families in the Plav-Gusinje region (~90 km to the northeast of Gruemirë) trace their origin to Gruemiri. The Rexhepagaj of Plav, Montenegro (now, Redžepagić-Rexhepagiqi) moved to Plav in the beginning of the 1650s where their ancestor took the Muslim name Veli when he converted. Rexhep Aga who gave the name to the family was a great-great-grandson of Veli. The Shabanagaj (now also known as Šabanagić) were related via marriage with the Bushati family of Shkodra. Shaban Aga, their eponymous ancestor was the son-in-law of Sulejman Pasha Bushati, sanjakbey of Shkodra. He was sent in Gusinje as the commander of the fortress around 1690. The Shabanagaj family owned large estates in Berane. Ali Pasha of Gusinje, commander of the League of Prizren was a Shabanagaj and Jashar Rexhepagiq, pedagogue in Kosovo, was a Rexhepagaj.

In 1675 Evliya Çelebi who visited Gusinje during this time, described it as a "lively Albanian town".

As the Ottoman Empire disintegrated in the long 19th century already in the Treaty of San Stefano, Gusinje and Plav were awarded to the independent Principality of Montenegro. Gusinje was developing as a commercial town at the time, but still remained outside properly established rule of Ottoman law. Gun ownership was widespread and Ottoman rule was difficult to enforce. This environment allowed for the existence of an effective resistance against annexation. The Albanians of Gusinje opposed the decisions of the treaty and sent telegrams of protest to the embassies of the Great Powers. In the Congress of Berlin and its final treaty those decisions were finalized. The Albanians in the two regions reacted against the final decision in favor annexation and formed the League of Prizren.

A noted figure of the League of Prizren was Ali Pasha Shabanagaj, a landowner and military commander from Gusinje. In the ensuing Battle of Novšiće the League of Prizren led by Shabanagaj defeated the approaching Montenegrin forces led by Marko Miljanov. More than 140 dead and wounded of the ~300 casualties of the League of Prizren in the battle were from Gusinje. Ismail Omeraga, was a leading commander of the Gusinje volunteers who died in the battles for the defense of Plav-Gusinje. His head was carried back in Cetinje, capital of Montenegro. Reports after the battle claim that the victors carried into the town 60 heads from their defeated foes. The annexation was effectively stopped and the Great Powers began another round of negotiations which eventually led to Ulcinj's annexation by Montenegro as compensation. The battle became a point of reference in the Albanian National Awakening and set a precedent about the need of armed struggle to defend other areas. Although the battle took place near Novšiće which is ~4 km to the north of Plav, in the Ottoman press of the time it became known as Gusinye hadisesi (Gusinye Incident) because of its crucial role in the struggle.

In 1893, Gusinje had 1,600 households, 5 mosques and 240 shops. The districts were part of the Sanjak of Novi Pazar of the Kosovo Vilayet until October 1912 (de jure, until 1913). The Montenegrin army captured the region and entered Plav on 19 October and 20 October. Its entry was followed by a period of harsh military administration which until March 1913 had caused up to more than 1,800 killings of locals and 12,000 forced conversions to Christian Orthodoxy. In the aftermath of the Balkan Wars, Gusinje became a subject of dispute between newly independent Albania and Montenegro. Nicholas I of Montenegro in the London Peace Conference asked for the region of Kelmendi as otherwise communication between the capital of Podgorica and the new eastern provinces of Montenegro would be blocked. As Kelmendi finally became part of Albania, Gusinje was given to Montenegro with the provision that the people of Kelmendi would have free passage to the town. About 2000 Albanian refugees from Gusinje and Plav were reported in Shkodra in 1913 by the director of the Red Cross which was stationed in the city. The beginning of WWI in practice stopped the implementation of any agreement. In 1919, the decision was reaffirmed but the border was closed. In Albania, the closing of the border between Malësia and Gusinje has been seen as a main cause for the interwar impoverishment of areas like Kelmendi and Shala, which were deprived from access to their traditional market town.

The entry of the Montenegrin army in 1912-13 and the Yugoslav army after 1919 in Gusinje was accompanied by repressive policies against the local population.In 1919, an Albanian revolt, which later came to be known as the Plav rebellion rose up in the Plav, Gusinje and Rozaje districts, fighting against the inclusion of Sandžak in the Kingdom of Serbs, Croats and Slovenes. As a result, during the Serbian army's second occupation of Gusinje, which took place in 1919, Serb forces attacked Albanian populations in Plav and Gusinje, which had appealed to the British government for protection. About 450 local civilians were killed after the uprising was quelled. These events resulted in a large influx of Albanians migrating to Albania. These events remain a matter of dispute in modern Montenegrin politics. In 2013, the President of Montenegro Filip Vujanović made one of the first direct acknowledgments of the events in Montenegrin politics in a ceremony in Berane where he declared that the crimes performed in Plav and Gusinje are the dark side of the Montenegrin history.

Gusinje became part of Albania in WWII by Fascist Italy and then Nazi Germany to win the support of the local population. After the war, the 1913 borders were reaffirmed. Gusinje's status as a distinct municipality was revoked in 1953. Along with other reasons it fueled immigration and impoverishment in the town and the municipality. In 2014, Gusinje regained its municipal status.

== Dialect ==
Gusinje is almost entirely Muslim and either Albanian-speaking or Slavic-speaking. The Slavic dialect of Gusinje and Plav shows very high structural influence from Albanian. Its uniqueness in terms of language contact between Albanian and Slavic is explained by the fact that most of the Slavic-speakers in today's Gusinje are of Albanian origin, representing a case of an Albanian-speaking population shifting to a Slavic-speaking one.

== Monuments ==
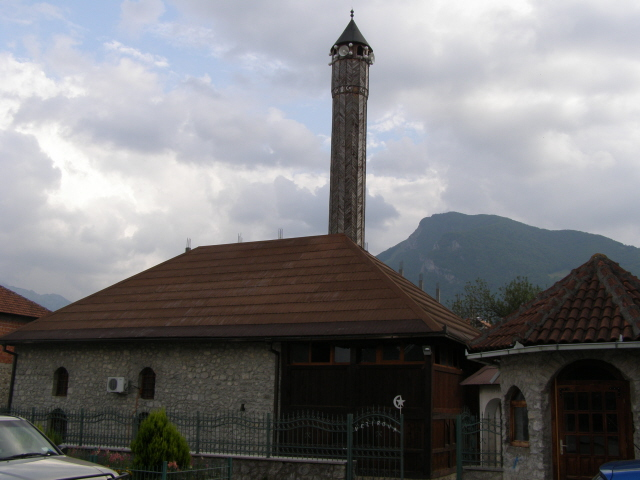
The Vizier's Mosque in the town's center

In Gusinje there are a number of the historical mosques of Montenegro. The oldest preserved mosque in the town is Čekića džamija or xhamia e Cekajve built by the Cekaj brotherhood of Triepshi. The second oldest is the Vezir's mosque (vezirova džamija/xhamia e vezirit) built by Kara Mahmud Bushati in 1765 on the existing site of another mosque originally built in 1626. The New Mosque (nova džamija/xhamia e re) also known as Radončića was built by the Radončići brotherhood of Kući in 1899. There are also a number of mosques whose ruins only remain today. The mosque of Sultan Ahmed I was built during his reign between 1603 and 1617. It was burnt in 1746-47. Another ruined mosque is that built by the Gjylbegaj family (a branch of the Begolli family). It was built in 1833.

== Demographics ==
Historical population
Year	Pop.	±%
1948	2,402	—
1953	2,555	+6.4%
1961	2,756	+7.9%
1971	2,695	−2.2%
1981	2,625	−2.6%
1991	2,472	−5.8%
2003	1,704	−31.1%
2011	1,673	−1.8%
2023	2,225	+33.0%

Since 1913, Gusinje has experienced many waves of emigration in the 20th century. These have depopulated it as a result in the 21st century. The municipality of Gusinje reports that 18,400 people trace their origins to the town of Gusinje out of a total diaspora of ~30,000 from the Gusinje area. They mostly live in the US.

=== Ethnicity ===
According to the Statistical Office of Montenegro, based on the 2023 census, 57.1% of the inhabitants of Gusinje Municipality are Bosniaks, while the second largest ethnic group are Albanians (34.4%).

=== Religion ===
Religion in Gusinje (2023)
1. Islam (92.5%)
2. Eastern Orthodoxy (3.10%)
3. Roman Catholicism (1.86%)
4. Other religions (2.26%)

== Sports ==
The local football team is FK Gusinje, who play in the country's third tier. They play their home games at the City Stadium. The town's basketball team is KK Stršljen.

== Notable people ==
- Ismail Nikoçi, mayor of Gusinje
- Ali Pasha of Gusinje, Albanian military commander, leader of the League of Prizren
- Haxhi Rexha Bekteshaj, Albanian anti-Yugoslav Kachak fighter
- Alija Gušanac (fl. 1804–05), Albanian Ottoman brigand (krdžalija) who served the Dahije, the renegade Janissaries who had taken the rule of the Sanjak of Smederevo following a coup.
- Rexho Mulliqi, Albanian composer
- Dženan Radončić, Montenegrin footballer
- Fahrudin Radončić, businessman and politician
- Ramo Kolenović, kayaker
- Dino Radončić, basketball player

== Twin towns – Sister cities ==
Gusinje is twinned with:

- Peja, Kosovo

== Sources ==
- Bartl, Peter (1976). Bernath, Mathias; Von Schröder, Felix; Nehring, Karl (eds.). Südosteuropäische Arbeiten: Biographisches Lexikon zur Geschichte Südosteuropas. Südost-Institut München. ISBN 9783486492415.
- Cornwall, Mark (1987). "Between two wars. King Nikola of Montenegro and the Great Powers, 1913-1914". The South Slav Journal. IX (1–2).
- Curtis, Matthew (2012). Slavic-Albanian Language Contact, Convergence, and Coexistence. Ohio State University. ISBN 978-1-2675-8033-7.
- Dedushaj, Rexhep (2012). 100 vjet luftë. New York.
- Elsie, Robert (2003). Early Albania: A reader of Historical texts, 11th–17th centuries. Wiesbaden: Otto Harrassowitz Verlag. ISBN 9783447047838.
- Galaty, Michael; Lafe, Ols; Lee, Wayne; Tafilica, Zamir (2013). Light and Shadow: Isolation and Interaction in the Shala Valley of Northern Albania. The Cotsen Institute of Archaeology Press. ISBN 978-1931745710.
- Gawrych, George (2006). The Crescent and the Eagle: Ottoman rule, Islam and the Albanians, 1874–1913. London: IB Tauris. ISBN 9781845112875.
- Gornje Polimlje: priroda, stanovništvo i naselja. Geografski institut Filozofskog fakulteta. 2005. ISBN 978-86-7794-000-3.
- Hadžić, Fatih (2018). "DŽAMIJE U JUŽNOM SANDŽAKU". Sto Godina Od Sjenicke Konferencije.
- Loma, Aleksandar (2013). La toponymie de la charte de fondation de Banjska: Vers la conception d'un dictionnaire des noms de lieux de la Serbie medievale et une meilleure connaissance des structures onomastiques du slave commun. Srpska akademija nauka i umetnosti. ISBN 978-86-7025-621-7.
- Milosević, Milena (2013). "Montenegro's Muslims Stage Mass Prayer to Mark 'Genocide'". Balkan Insight.
- Morrison, Kenneth (2018). Nationalism, Identity and Statehood in Post-Yugoslav Montenegro. Bloomsbury Publishing. ISBN 978-1474235198.
- Pacariz, Sabina (2014). Yearbook of Muslims in Europe. BRILL. p. 437. ISBN 9789004283053.
- Pieroni, Andrea (2010). "People and Plants in Lëpushë Traditional Medicine, Local Foods and Post- communism in a Northern Albanian Village". In Santayana, Manuel Pardo; PIeroni, Andrea; Puri, Rajindra K. (eds.). Ethnobotany in the New Europe: People, Health, and Wild Plant Resources. Berghahn Books. ISBN 978-1845454562.
- Pulaha, Selami (1974). Defter i Sanxhakut të Shkodrës 1485 [Defter of the Sanjak of Shkodra in 1485. Academy of Sciences of Albania. p. 99.
- "STUDIJA O OPRAVDANOSTI OSNIVANJA OPŠTINE GUSINJE" (PDF). Opstina Gusinje. Gusinje Municipality. 2012.
- Zajednica osnovnog obrazovanja i vaspitanja (1986). Simpozijum seoski dani Sretena Vukosavljevića. Vol. 11. Prijepolje: Opštinska zajednica obrazovanja.
