= Syle Rexha Tower House =

Cultural heritage monument of Kosovo

- Kulla e Sylë Rexhës (Albanian)
- Location: Vranoc, Peja, Kosovo

History
- Built: 18th century

Site notes
- Architectural style: Ottoman architecture
- Restored: 2006–2009

The Syle Rexha Tower House is a cultural heritage monument in Vranoc, Peja, Kosovo. It was built in the 18th century. The two-story building is made from river stone save for the carved stone corners and was designed by artisans from the Sanjak of Dibra as well as the family of the eponymous feudal lord.

== Description ==
This tower house or kulla belongs to a type in which a stone dome extends across the front and part of two of the side walls. The tower's functions are threefold: a ground-floor stable, a first-floor family room, and a second-floor men's chamber. Different-sized arched windows let in appropriate amounts of light for each room's purpose. A bedroom and bathroom uniquely stand out as side elements jutting out at opposite ends. The stone is highly ornamented, including 26 symbolic relics inside and out of the cult of the sun and snake cults from Illyrian religion. The large arched courtyard doors, built several years later as part of the surrounding complex, are their own structure through which family members would come and go, and feature another 7 Illyrian religious decorations on the wide arch.

== Restoration ==
Burned down during the Kosovo War, the building was restored from 2006 to 2009, renovating the interior for modern lodging.
