= Hysni Curri =

Kosovar Albanian military commander (died 1925)

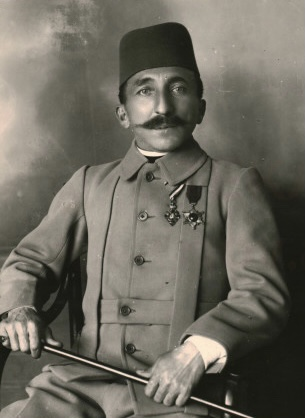
- Born: Yakova, Ottoman Empire
- Died: 1925; Vienna, Austria
- Other name: Hysni Bey Curri
- Occupation: Military
- Known for: Kachak guerrillas Committee of Kosovo

Hysni Curri (?–1925) was a Kosovar Albanian military figure and a prominent leader of the Kachak movement and the Committee for the National Defence of Kosovo.

== Life ==
Curri was the nephew and close collaborator of Bajram Curri, a well-known fighter and activist during the early 20th century. He was born in Gjakova, Vilayet of Kosovo, Ottoman Empire ( today modern Kosovo ). He had military background and would embrace the Albanian National Awakening movement. In 2–3 April 1910, he participated in the Second Congress of Manastir, which revised the situation of the Albanian language schools and publications under the newly imposed censure of the Young Turk government. Curri was active during the Albanian uprisings of 1910, 1911, and 1912 and delegate in the Assembly of Junik of May 1912 where the official demands list of the Albanian rebels towards the Ottomans was drafted. He led the Albanian army against the Ottomans on 7 August 1912 at Qafë Prush, which led to the Albanians entering Skopje, the center of the Vilayet, on 12 August 1912.

He was one of the co-founders of the short-lived Nationalist Party (Albanian: Partia Nacionaliste) created in Albania in 1914, together with Hil Mosi, Sabri Qyteza, Kostandin Boshnjaku, Ceno Sharra, etc. Curri put himself in service of Prince Wied and defended Durrës from the Islamic Rebels during 1914. He was in charge of around 400 men.

On 17 April 1917, he would participate as a representative of the Krasniqi tribe and Vice-Prefect of the Prefecture of Kosovo in the Albanian delegation of 33 people that visited Vienna, including Hasan Prishtina, Ahmet Zogu, and Dom Nikollë Kaçorri.

Curri was very active during the years of the Committee of Kosovo. As a main member he was selected to represent the Committee in the Congress of Lushnje of 1920. Eshtref Frashëri was elected to represent the committee, while Hysni Curri and Xhemal Prishtina represented the Prefecture of Kosovo (Has-Tropojë) and the Irredentist Kosovo. Curri could not attend because he broke his arm the night before the event.

In 1920, after the Congress of Lushnje, together with Bajram Curri he assisted the forces of Ahmet Zogu (then Minister of Interior) to get rid of Essadist supporters that had remained in central and north-eastern Albania.

In the years to come, the coordination between the official Tirana politics with the Serbian one created an unfavorable situation for the Committee of Kosovo. The Ministry of Interior in Tirana issued a note on 9 January 1923 to the Serbian authorities stating that "if the kachaks entered the neutral zone, the Serbian army could pursue them even there". On these conditions, Prishtina and Curri sought support from the Albanian Émigré in Italy and Austria, as well as from Italian and Austrian governments. On 27 August 1923, a group of 27 activists traveled down to Shëngjin, then by boat to Italy and later to Austria. Later, Hasan Prishtina would notify Bajram Curri via telegram for 20,000 rifles and 12 cannons which were promised to be delivered for the guerrillas.

== Death ==
Curri died in Vienna in 1925. He was buried in Zentralfriedhof cemetery.

== See also ==
- Isa Boletini
- Azem Galica
