= Agan Koja =

Albanian Islamic cleric and activist (1892–1929)

Agan Koja (Note: Note: His name is misspelled in some sources as Agan Kaja. In Serbo-Croatian, he is known as Agan Kojić.) (1892-1929) was an Albanian Muslim cleric and political activist from Plav, present-day Montenegro. He was a member of the Committee for the National Defence of Kosovo and fought as kachak against Yugoslav border troops after 1919 when his home region became part of Yugoslavia. He was killed by Yugoslav agents in Tropojë in 1929. In 1992, on the 80th anniversary of the declaration of independence of Albania he was honored with the Order of Freedom (1st Class) of Albania.

He was born in Prnjavor, Plav most likely in 1892, although on his gravestone 1885 is marked as his year of birth. He studied Islamic theology and was the imam of Plav before WWI. In WWI, he was a ranked officer in the Austro-Hungarian army. In 1918, as the war was coming to its end and many Albanians who opposed Austro-Hungarian occupation had been imprisoned, he disarmed Austro-Hungarian troops in Plav and killed their commander. The weapons were distributed to the locals to prepare against a future Yugoslav annexation. Koja joined Committee for the National Defence of Kosovo and was a member of the local Plav-Gusinje committee. After the assassination of Ismail Nikoçi in 1919, he took the leadership of the refugees who had fled to Albania after the Yugoslav army attacked the region. In Albania, Agan Koja settled in the area of Tropojë close to the new border between Albania and Yugoslavia. He led a group of kachaks who fought against the Yugoslav army in the borderlands. In one such skirmish, his group executed four Yugoslav officers and disarmed 50 conscripts. In Tropojë, Koja became the imam in a local mosque. The Yugoslav government place a bounty for his killing - like for many other kachaks. He was assassinated in Tropoja in 1929. He is a considered a local hero in Sandzak among both Albanians and Bosniaks.

== Sources ==
- Dedushaj, Rexhep (1993). Krahina e Plavë-Guci së nëpër shekuj [The region of Plav-Gusinje throughout the centuries]. New York. OCLC 43026372.
- Verli, Marenglen (2007). Shqipëria dhe Kosova: historia e një aspirate (studiume historike, kumtesa, dokumente dhe ilustrime). Botimpex. ISBN 978-9994380145.
- Lješnjanin, Safet (2018). "Mula Agan Kojić – vođa komite iz Plava". Almanah. 77–78.
