= Committee for the National Defence of Kosovo =

Political activist organisation

The Committee for the National Defence of Kosovo
- Komiteti "Mbrojtja Kombëtare e Kosovës"
- Flag

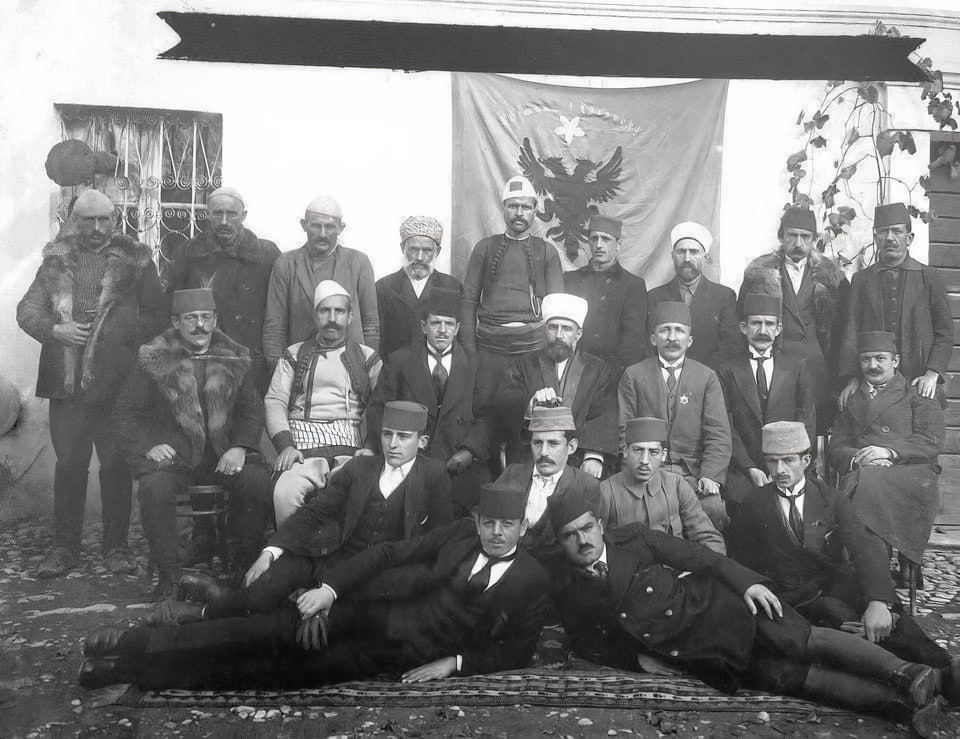
- Members of the Committee in a group photo
- Formation: 1 May 1918; 108 years ago
- Founder: Hoxha Kadri
- Founded at: Shkodër, Albania
- Purpose: political activism
- Key people: Hasan Prishtina, Qazim Begolli, Hysni Curri

The Committee for the National Defence of Kosovo (Albanian: Komiteti "Mbrojtja Kombëtare e Kosovës" abbrev. KMKK) was an Albanian organization founded in Shkodër on 1 May 1918. It mainly consisted of the political exiles from Kosovo and was led by Hoxha Kadri from Pristina. It had existed in looser form since May 1915.

== History ==
=== Objectives and members ===
Prominent members were:

- Hoxha Kadri,
- Hasan Prishtina,
- Bajram Curri,
- Asllan Curri
- Azem Galica
- Bedri Pejani,
- Sali Nivica,
- Salih Vuçitërni,
- Elez Isufi,
- Eshref Frashëri,
- Avni Rustemi
- Salih Gjuka,
- Ismet Bey Kryeziu
- Halim Jakova-Gostivari
- Qazim Begolli
- Sadik Rama
- Ismail Nikoçi
- Hysni Curri,
- Qazim Mulleti
- Sotir Peçi,
- Agan Koja
- Jusuf Mehonjić,
- Haxhi Rexha Bekteshaj
- Bajram Fevziu,

The main objectives of the committee were to:

1. campaign against the borders of the Principality of Albania, established on the basis of the Treaty of London (1913)
2. liberate Kosovo
3. unite all Albanian-inhabited lands

=== Activity in Yugoslavia ===
The committee organizationally and financially supported the kachaks in Kosovo and Skopje. On 6 May 1919 the Committee called for a general uprising in Kosovo and other Albanian regions in Yugoslavia. This led to a large scale revolt in Drenica involving around 10,000 people under Azem Galica. The uprising was quelled by the Yugoslav army. The confrontation continued through the years 1920 and 1921, 1923, with a revival in 1924. One of the achievements was the creation of the "neutral zone" around Junik which would serve for jeopardizing the frontier and providing ammunition and other logistical support for the Kachaks.

=== Endeavors with Albanian governments ===
In 1920, Beqir Vokshi represented the Committee in an assembly held at Trieste organized by the Italian scholar and politician Gabriele D'Annunzio, well known for his activism and support for Italian, Croat, and Albanian irredentist groupings. In this meeting, D'Annunzio promised armament to the Albanians of Kosovo. Indeed, in the summer of 1920, a ship with armament came in Shengjin. The "delivery" preoccupied the Albanian government and specifically the Minister of Interior Ahmet Zogu. He sent Sejfi Vllamasi and Xhemal Naipi to negotiate with the Committee for rejecting the delivery, promising money (20,000 Golden Franks). After Curri and Pejani rejected Zogu's offer, the Prefecture of Shkodra sent units of gendarmes to stop the delivery form being handed over. This was the first big contradiction between the Committee and Zogu.

The Committee leaders as Bajram Curri (initially only), Hasan Prishtina, Elez Isufi, and Zija Dibra organized in the Albanian Revolt of 1922 when their forces marched toward Tirana. They reached the northeastern neighborhoods of the capital, went into skirmish with the government forces led by Prenk Pervizi and withdrew only after the intervention of British diplomat Harry Eyres. They were first given death sentence by the military court and later received amnesty.

In January 1923, conflict will rise between the Committee leaders as Prishtina, Curri and Galica and pro-Zogu elements. Beqir Vokshi (1895–1923), and Sali Bajraktari of Junik were operating in the Neutral Zone of Junik for convincing the population to stop the support for the irredentist chetas and accept the law and order. After a sharp discussion with Hasan Prishtina on 21 January regarding to Vokshi's activity of convincing many fighters not to support Prishtina in his next attempt of overthrowing Zogu's government, Vokshi, who had resigned from the Committee since the 1921 and was officially listed as member of Albanian military units, was assassinated in z skirmish with Azem Galica's men, together with one of his collaborators on 22 January. The assassination was not received well as Vokshi was a known leader and nephew of Sulejman Vokshi, one of the heroes of the League of Prizren. Vokshi's supporters sought revenge and the larger conflict was avoided only after the intervention of the Sali Rama and his guerrillas from Rugova. Following the events, the Albanian army entered Junik and later handed it over to the Yugoslav forces. The kachaks moved inside Kosovo. The Neutral Zone of Junik ceased existing.

During June 1924, the Committee members would support the so-called June Revolution. The Committee was one of the 5 pillars of the Noli' movement (together with the army, liberal beys, the progressives, and the Shkodrans - catholic leaders from Shkodër), though they we not invited to be part of the new government. Nevertheless, there was cooperation and support between the Committee and Noli government. According to the Belgrade newspaper Vreme, Noli and the head of the Committee were working closely together. An article on the Morning Post of November 17, 1924 stated that "the Yugoslav government was in possession that the Soviets have provided moral and material help to the Croat peasant leader Stjepan Radić, Noli, the Committee of Kosovo, and the Macedonian revolutionary organizations". With rise of Ahmet Zogu in power, who was a sworn enemy of the Kosovar irredentists, the Committee was banned as a sign of Zogu's appreciation for Yugoslavian support and most of Committee's leaders fled the country. Many of them joined the KONARE ("Revolutionary National Committee") founded by Noli, and Bashkimi Kombëtar ("The National Union") founded in Vienna by Sotir Peçi, Xhemal Bushati, Angjelin Suma, and Ali Këlcyra. The Committee would receive some financial support from Comintern with Kosta Boshnjaku and Noli as intermediaries. The head of the Committee back then were Ibrahim Gjakova, Bedri Pejani, and Qamil Bala.

=== Assassination of leadership ===
On July 15 Azem Galica fell in Kosovo betrayed by Zogu's agents. Elez Isufi was shot and died in December 1924 during Zogu' offensive against Noli's government. In 1925, Asllan Curri and Zija Dibra were captured and killed by the gendarmes of Zogu's right hand and brother-in-law Ceno Beg Kryeziu. Both were shot in dubious circumstances during their way to the prison with the same pretext of "having tried to escape". Bajram Curri would continue fighting and was killed on March 29, 1925. He shot himself for not surrendering alive as was surrounded by Zogist troops while fighting in a cave near Dragobia. In 1933, Hasan Prishtina was killed by Zogu's agent Ibrahim Celo in a cafe in Thessaloniki.

=== Tentative for reestablishment ===
According to Sejfi Vllamasi's memories, after the affiliation with Italy, King Zog accepted in 1936 the re-establishment of the Committee by even offering wages for the leadership under Qazim Koculi. Nevertheless, the Committee would not function anymore. Meanwhile, by that time, Hasan Prishtina, Zija Dibra, Curri, and Rustemi would be eliminated by Zogu. After the death of Curri and Prishtina, the Committee had gone into lethargy.

In 1936, there was a revival in the Committee with new members as Sali Moni (Bajraktari), Xhaferr Spahija from Tropojë, Mehmed Alija from Vlanë, Has, Baftijar Kollovozi of Luma, Murat Kaloshi, etc. The cells were directed by Ismet Bey Kryeziu of Gjakova, a former representative in the Parliament of Kingdom of Yugoslavia, and Salih Bey Vuçitërni, a Kosovar Albanian politician who had come to Albania in early '20s. Both were trusted men of Zog, unlike the original members during the foundation. A small correspondent cell existed in Kosovo, stationed in Mitrovica led by Ferhat Draga, another person in good relations with Zog. Other members there were Xhafer Deva, Shaban Mustafa, and Mustafa Aliu, all from Mitrovica.

Despite its presence, the committee's work was limited to diplomacy, propaganda, and recruiting, rather than any military activity. Its existence was strongly influenced by ups and downs of the relations between Zog's governments and Yugoslavia.

The Italian-German occupation of World War II would change the situation in Kosovo.

== Representation ==
The Committee was very influential in North Albania and especially around Shkodër. It sent its delegates to the Congress of Lushnje of 1920. Eshtref Frashëri was elected to represent the Committee, while Hysni Curri and Xhemal Prishtina to represent the Prefecture of Kosovo (Has-Tropojë-Lumë) and the Irredentist Kosovo.
Kadri Prishtina (Hoxha Kadri) was the main representative and contact person to foreign authorities. All the memorandums, protests notes, request and other correspondence were prepared by him, translated by Bedri Pejani, and delivered usually with the help of American Red Cross or some French military commander stationed in the city. The Committee would act as the distributor of American Red Cross deliveries of medicaments, food, and clothes throughout North Albania.

Though KONARE, and also directly, the Committee of Kosovo participated in the Balkan Federation, a Comintern agency for the communization of nationally disaffected nations of the Balkans, thereby continuing Bajram Curri's early contacts (since 1921) with the Soviets. But as the policy of the defense of Yugoslavia became the official positioning of the Communists in the 1930s, that line of support faded.

The Committee collaborated with other nationalist movements that had risen inside Yugoslavia in response to Serbian hegemony. Mainly through Zija Dibra, its leaders would get in contact and meet with Stjepan Radić, leader of Croatian People's Peasant Party, Bulgarian VMRO revolutionaries Todor Aleksandrov and Petar Chaulev, and Montenegrin Marko Raspopović who had settled in Shkodër. King Zog's secret police would collaborate with Serbian counterparts in eliminating them too.

== Press ==
The newspaper Populli ("The people"), republished in May 1918 by Sali Nivica in Shkodër, became the unofficial journal of the Committee. It gave a big support to the Committee and propagandized struggle against the Serbian occupation in Kosovo, as well as against Italian's imperialistic politics towards Albania. After Nivica's assassination in 1920, it continued under the direction of Bedri Pejani.

== See also ==
- Albania-Serbia relations
- Second League of Prizren
