= Hasan Prishtina =

Albanian politician (1873–1933)

Hasan Prishtina Bey
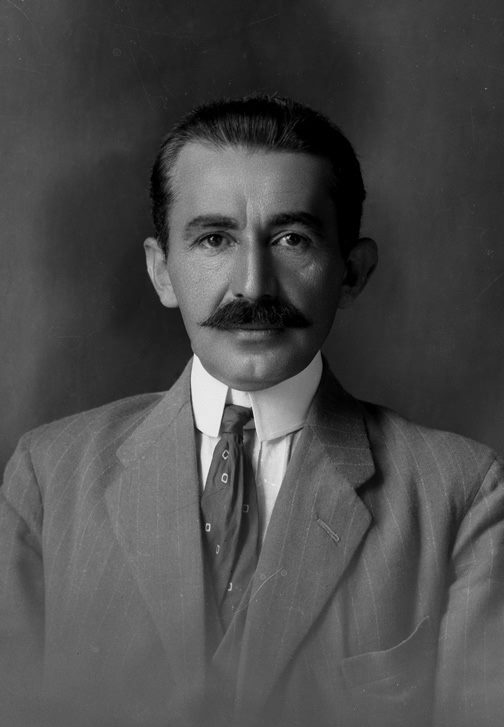
- Prishtina in 1921

8th Prime Minister of Albania
- In office 7 December 1921 – 12 December 1921
- Monarch: Wilhelm I
- Preceded by: Qazim Koculi
- Succeeded by: Idhomene Kosturi

Member of the Chamber of Deputies
- In office 23 December 1908 – 17 January 1912
- Sultan: Abdulhamid II (r. 1876–1909); Mehmed V (r. 1909–1918)
- Constituency: Sanjak of Prishtina

Personal details
- Born: Hasan Berisha; 27 September 1873 Vushtrri, Vilayet of Kosovo, Ottoman Empire
- Died: 13 August 1933 (aged 59) Thessaloniki, Greece
- Cause of death: Assassination
- Resting place: Kukës, Albanian Kingdom
- Occupation: Politician
- Profession: Lawyer

Hasan Bey Prishtina, (born Hasan Berisha; 27 September 1873 – 13 August 1933), was an Ottoman, later Albanian, politician who served as the 8th prime minister of Albania in December 1921.

== Biography ==
=== Family and early life ===
Monument and family tree plaque in Polac (Drenica), showing the Veliu ancestors of Hasan Prishtina

In his memoirs, Prishtina wrote that his family originated from Poljance in the Drenica region, and that his ancestors gave valuable contributions to the Albanian revolts against the Ottoman Empire. He wrote that his grandfather, Haxhi Ali Berisha, who moved to Vushtrri in 1871, was the son of Abdullah Ali Berisha. Haxhi's younger son, Ahmet, was the father of Hasan. Prishtina said that family's links to the Drenica region were celebrated with songs and other traditions. The Berisha family was autochthonous to the province of Dukagjini, of which Vushtrri is also part. Archival research done by Muhamet Pirraku confirms Hasan Prishtina's writings, and points that some documents give an alternative name for Abdullah Ali Berisha, ‘Mehmet’.

According to Pirraku's research and historical memory in the Drenica region, the family belongs to the Veliu branch (Veliqët) of the Berisha tribe, tracing back to Hasan Prishtina's paternal ancestor, Ali Veliqi.

Hasan was born in 1873 in Vushtrri and had one brother named Ymer. After finishing his studies at the French gymnasium in Thessaloniki, he studied politics and law in Istanbul. He was originally known as "Hasan Berisha".

He initially supported the Young Turk Revolution of 1908. Prishtina was elected to the Ottoman parliament in 1908 and became affiliated to the Young Turk (CUP) party. He changed his last name to Prishtina in 1908, when he was elected as Pristina’s delegate in the Ottoman parliament in Istanbul during the Second Constitutional Era. Actions by the Ottoman government against rebels and civilians in Kosovo during 1909 led Prishtina to publish an article titled "Albanians" in the Young Turk newspaper Tanin. He stressed that force was unproductive and unable to bring peace and security while reforms were needed following the example of Midhat Pasha. As a parliamentarian, Prishtina viewed the place of Albanians in the empire as partners entitled in the decision-making process which was partly based upon ethnic politics. He expressed that sentiment in an analogy delivered to parliament in early May 1911. Prishtina defined the Ottoman state as a "joint stock company with common interest... owned by Turks, Albanians, and other peoples, [all] with equal shares" and without anyone "deserving preferential treatment". By late 1911, Prishtina had joined the Freedom and Accord Party which was founded by him and ten others who were opponents of the Young Turks and advocated for Ottomanism, government decentralisation and the rights of ethnic minorities. In 1911, Prishtina wrote a chapter on the revolt of Albanian highlanders (Malësors) and highlighted their important duties surrounding border defense in an edited book titled Musaver Arnavud (The Illustrated Albanian) in Ottoman Turkish by Dervish Hima.

=== Albanian National Movement ===
During December 1911, Prishtina and Ismail Qemali convened secret meetings of Albanian political notables in Istanbul that decided to organise a future Albanian uprising. Mehmed V dissolved parliament and called for new elections on 17 January 1912 with Prishtina going to Kosovo shortly thereafter to begin the organisation of the uprising. In the Ottoman elections of April 1912, the CUP won most parliamentary seats by rigging the election and prevented its Albanian critics like Prishtina from retaining their positions. After the Ottoman Government did not keep their promises for more rights and independence to the Albania nation, Hasan Prishtina and several other prominent Albanian intellectuals started organizing the Albanian National Movement. He together with Isa Boletini and Bajram Curri took the responsibility to start the Albanian National Movement in Kosovo. In 1912, due to the deteriorating situation between Albanians and Ottoman authorities, Prishtina alongside other Albanian leaders were present at a meeting in Junik on 20 May where a besa (pledge) was given to wage war on the Young Turk government.

Üsküp, capital of the Kosovo vilayet, after being captured by Albanian revolutionaries

Until August 1912, Prishtina led the Albanian rebels to gain control over the whole Kosovo vilayet (including Novi Pazar, Sjenica, Prishtina and even Skopje), part of Scutari Vilayet (including Elbasan, Përmet, Leskovik and Konitsa in Janina Vilayet and Dibër in Monastir Vilayet. Marshall Ibrahim Pasha was sent by the Ottomans to negotiate terms and on 9 August met with leaders of the uprising where Prishtina presented the Fourteen Points and the commander then sent them to Istanbul and returned to his army. Prishtina however retreated from insisting upon autonomy that disappointed some Albanian nationalists. On 18 August, the moderate faction led by Prishtina managed to convince leaders Boletini, Curri, Riza Bey Gjakova and Idriz Seferi of the conservative group to accept the agreement with the Ottomans for Albanian sociopolitical and cultural rights. In assisting to formulate the Fourteen Points, in part secured by Kosovo Albanian military action against the Ottomans, Prishtina in his role as a Kosovar notable and Albanian patriot balanced national and regional concerns.

=== Albanian independence and World War I ===
During the Balkan Wars he was arrested by commanders from the Kingdom of Serbia. In December 1913, after Albanian independence, he served as minister of agriculture, and in March 1914 was made minister of postal services in the government of Independent Albania led by Ismail Kemal.

During the First World War he organized divisions of volunteers to fight for Austria-Hungary. In 1918, after the Serb recapture of Kosovo from Austria-Hungary, Prishtina, together with Bajram Curri, fled to Vienna and later to Rome. Hasan Prishtina became a head of the Committee for the National Defence of Kosovo in Rome in 1918.

=== Political career ===
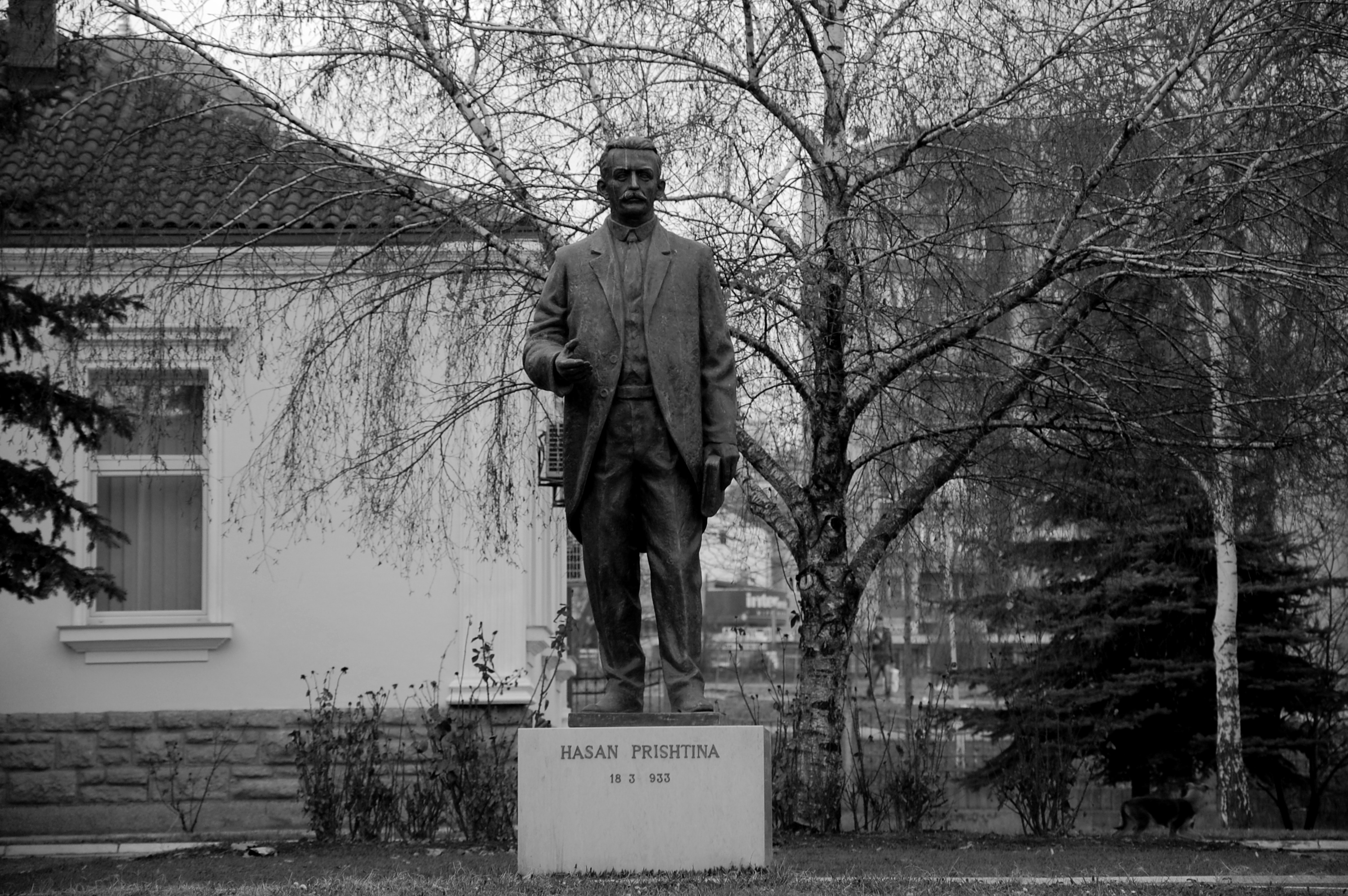
Monument to Hasan Prishtina at the University of Prishtina

Hasan Prishtina was in charge of the delegation of the Committee in December 1919 which represented Albanians for the protection of their rights in the Paris Peace Conference, where he requested the unification of Kosovo and Albania.

== Exile and death ==
When Zogu took power in December 1924, Prishtina was forced to leave Albania. As he could not return to Kosovo, he settled in Thessalonika where he purchased a large estate. Prishtina was an enemy of Zogu, the two having attempted to assassinate one another. He was imprisoned by the Yugoslav police for a period, but was released in 1931. In 1933, he was killed by Ibrahim Celo in a cafe in Thessalonika, on the orders of King Zog.

== Legacy ==
Hasan Prishtina is commemorated in Kosovo and Albania. In 1993, when a meeting commemorating the 60th anniversary of his death was convened in Mitrovica, Serbian police raided the place and showed machine guns to the participants. Out of 80 participants, 37 were arrested and the rest were beaten for 5 to 15 minutes by police. In 2012 a statue of Prishtina was elevated in Skopje in Skanderbeg Square. Hasan Bej Prishtina is honored by the Albanians as an important national hero and freedom fighter. A primary school in Tirana and the University of Prishtina are named after him. On 2 May 2014, he was posthumously awarded the Order of Merit of the National Flag by the Albanian President Bujar Nishani.

== See also ==
- History of Albania
- List of prime ministers of Albania

== Sources ==
- Bernath, Mathias; Schroeder, Felix von (1979). Biographisches Lexikon zur Geschichte Südosteuropas. Vol. 3. Oldenbourg. ISBN 978-3-486-48991-0.
- Elsie, Robert (2010). Historical Dictionary of Kosovo. London: Scarecrow Press. pp. 223–224. ISBN 9780810874831.
- Gawrych, George (2006). The Crescent and the Eagle: Ottoman rule, Islam and the Albanians, 1874–1913. London: IB Tauris. ISBN 9781845112875.
- Malcolm, Noel (1998). Kosovo: a short history. Macmillan. pp. 245, 248, 417. ISBN 978-0-333-66612-8.
- Pearson, Owen (2004). Albania in the Twentieth Century, A History: Volume I: Albania and King Zog, 1908-39. I.B.Tauris. ISBN 978-1-84511-013-0.
- Skendi, Stavro (1967). The Albanian national awakening. Princeton: Princeton University Press. ISBN 9781400847761.

Political offices
Preceded by Unknown	Member of the Ottoman Parliament (as representative of Pristina); 1908–1912	Succeeded by Post abolished
Preceded by Qazim Koculi	Prime Minister of Albania; 7 December 1921 – 12 December 1921	Succeeded by Idhomene Kosturi
