= Bajram Curri =

Albanian chieftain, politician, and activist (1860–1925)

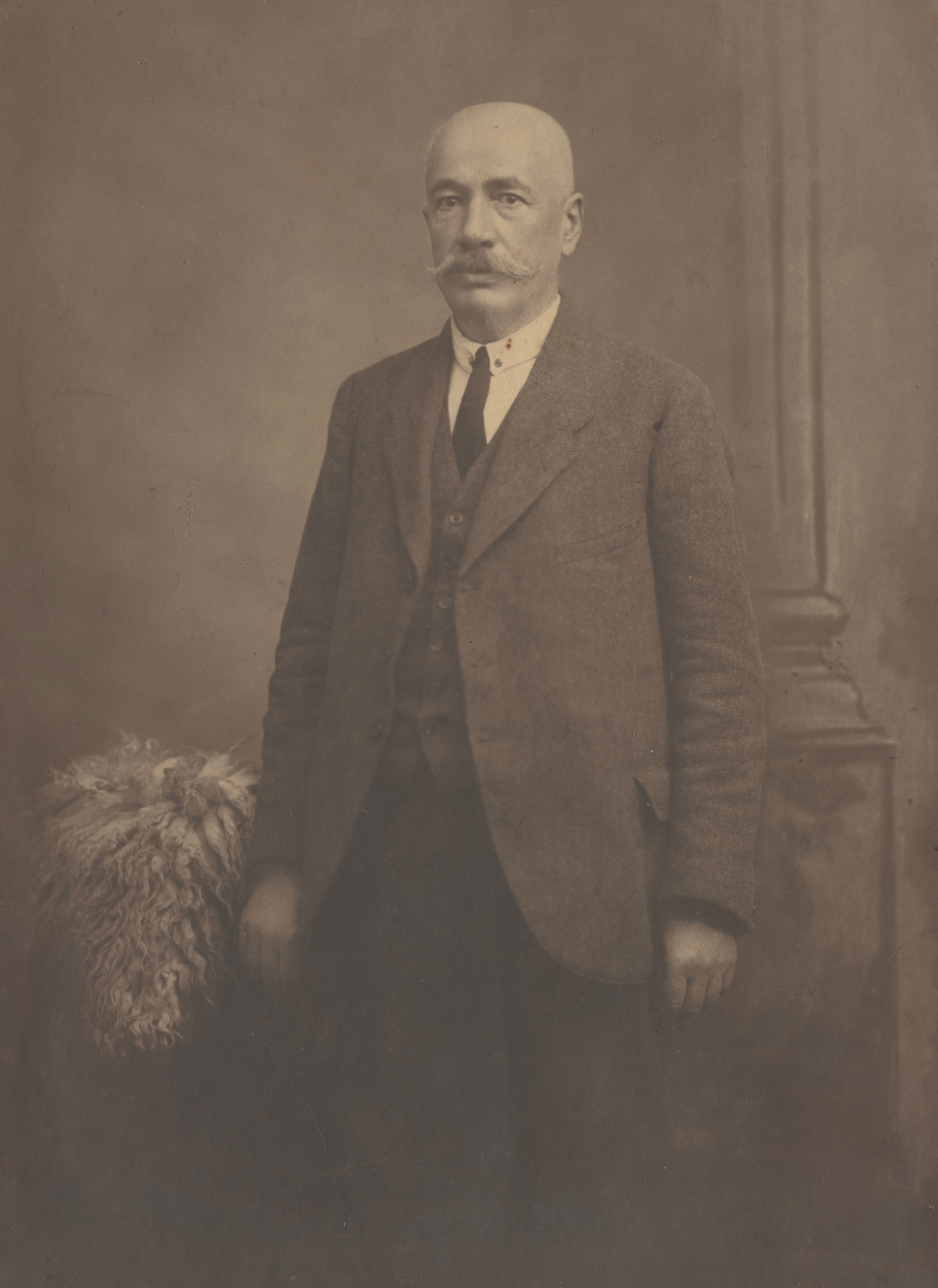

Member of the Albanian parliament

Minister without Portfolio
- In office 27 March 1920 – 14 November 1920

Personal details
- Born: Bajram Curri; 16 January 1862 Gjakova, Kosovo vilayet, Ottoman Empire (now Kosovo)
- Died: 29 March 1925 (aged 63) Dragobi
- Cause of death: Assassinated
- Parent: Shaqir Aga Curri (father)
- Awards: Hero of the People

Bajram Curri (16 January 1862 – 29 March 1925) was an Albanian chieftain, politician, and activist who struggled for the independence of Albania, later struggling for Kosovo's incorporation into it following the 1913 Treaty of London. He was posthumously given the title Hero of Albania.

== Early life ==
Bajram Curri was born in the 1860s in the village of Krushë e Madhe, while his family was being sent to prison from Gjakova to Prizren. Most sources place his year of birth as 1862, while more recent sources based on his recently discovered passport state 1866. His family originated in Krasniqi (present-day Tropojë), in the Highlands of Gjakova. At his birth, the Curri family was led to the Ottoman prison in Krushë e Madhe, Rahovec. His father, Shaqir Aga, had led a rebellion in Krasniq against the Ottomans due to heavy taxes and military recruitment, and had been interned by them. Shaqir Aga Curri was a trusted man of Abdullah Pasha Dreni of Gjakova and was instrumental in tax-collection procedures and punishing expeditions of Pasha Dreni in the area. He aided Pasha Dreni during the Attack against Mehmed Ali Pasha and was killed in the skirmish by the forces of the League of Prizren.

== Career ==
While the regions of present-day Albania were under Ottoman control, Curri represented Albanian interests.

Between 1885 and 1886, he entered a feud with Riza Bey Gjakova that lasted for a decade. It ended only when the sultan sent an envoy to confer a military command and rank upon each man; Curri became a captain of the gendarmerie in Pristina. To govern, Sultan Abdulhamid II used patronage networks by awarding privileges and government positions to co-opt local leaders such as Curri into the Ottoman system. In 1893, he participated in a revolt in Kosovo led by Haxhi Zeka, which was quickly suppressed by the Ottoman army. In 1899, he became a founding member of Zeka's League of Peja. In 1906, he became one of the founders of the Gjakovë branch of the Secret Committee for the Liberation of Albania (Bashkimi Society) and an influential member.

Like some educated Albanians with nationalist sentiments of the time, Curri supported the unity of Albanians from different religions under the banner of Skanderbeg and favoured government reforms that benefited Albanians. During the Young Turk Revolution, Galib Bey managed to get Albanian leaders Curri, Nexhip Draga, and Ferhat Draga to attend a meeting at Firzovik (modern Ferizaj) and use their influence to sway the crowd through fears of "foreign intervention" to support constitutional restoration. During the 31 March Incident, among the 15,000 volunteers assisting the larger Ottoman army, Curri, along with Çerçiz Topulli, mobilized 8,000 Albanians to suppress the revolt in Istanbul. The repressive activities and broken promises of the Young Turks, however, led Curri to resume militant activities against the Ottoman authorities. In 1912, due to the deteriorating situation between Albanians and Ottoman authorities, Curri, alongside other Albanian leaders, were present at a meeting in Junik on 20 May where a besa (pledge) was given to wage war on the Young Turk government. He had an active role in the Albanian Revolt of 1912, fighting alongside Hasan Prishtina, Isa Boletini, Themistokli Gërmenji, and others against the Turks. He was also one of the leaders in the Battle of Lumë against the Serbian military, which delayed their expansion to Albania and secured Albanian independence. On August 18, the moderate faction led by Prishtina managed to convince Curri and other leaders, Idriz Seferi, Riza Bey Gjakova, and Isa Boletini of the conservative group, to accept the agreement with the Ottomans for Albanian sociopolitical and cultural rights. He successfully fought in 1912 against the Young Turks. During the 1912 uprising, while waiting for an Ottoman response to the demands of the rebels, Curri and other leaders of the rebellion ordered their forces to advance toward Üsküb (modern Skopje), which was captured on August 12–15.

During World War I, he organized a guerrilla unit as part of the Kachak movement through the Committee for the National Defence of Kosovo, of which he was a member. On 20 October 1914, 1,000 Albanians, led by Bajram Curri, Isa Boletini, Bulgarian komitadjis and Austro-Hungarian officers, attacked a Montenegrin base near Gjakova, and took two hill artillery pieces with them. The Montenegrin army then surrounded and defeated them, and pushed them into Albanian territory.

In 1915, he became a founding member of the Committee for the National Defence of Kosovo. This organization later established relations with the Comintern (which gave support for the self-determination of nations), with Curri later saying in December 1921 to the Soviet minister in Vienna that, "The Albanian people await impatiently the determination of their frontiers not based on of brutal and bloody historical considerations, but rather based on of the situation which actually exists today. With the firm conviction that Soviet Russia will be able in the near future to determine the boundaries of Europe, especially in the Balkans, in a just manner, I pray that the great Soviet government will grant our just requests at that time."

Following the Congress of Lushnja in 1920, he became a minister without portfolio in the Albanian cabinet. In Albania's politics, he identified himself with the left-wing forces of Fan Noli against Ahmet Zogu. In December 1921, he became Minister of War in the unstable government of Hasan Prishtina, replacing Zogu. Within days, however, Zogu assembled his fellow Mati tribesmen and overthrew the government, forcing Prishtina, Curri, and others to flee northwards. In March 1922, Curri and Prishtina began a revolt against Zogu, which failed. The revolt was crushed on 8 March 1922 by Captain Prenk Pervizi, owing to the efforts of the British ambassador to Albania, Harry Eyres, who convinced one of the rebel commanders to surrender. Two years later, having stayed in the meantime in the mountains in order to evade Zogist forces, he issued the call to arms which began the Bourgeois-Democratic Revolution of June 1924 against Zogu.

Following the defeat of the revolution, Curri continued his opposition to Zogu. On March 29, 1925, he was surrounded by Zogist troops while hiding in a cave near Dragobia. He was killed by his own friends so their lives could be spared by the zogist troops.

Years later, in honor of Bajram Curri, the town of Kolgecaj was renamed after him in 1952.
