= World War II in Albania =

- Part of the European theatre and Mediterranean and Middle East theatre of World War II
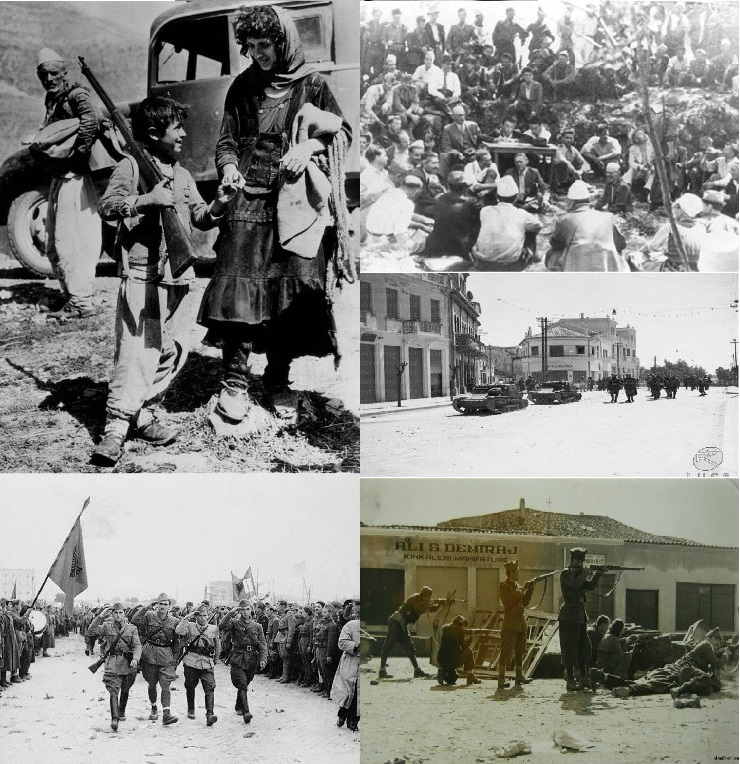
- Clockwise from top left: Albanian refugees crossing the border to Yugoslavia in April 12, 1939, Ballists and Communists converse during Mukje Agreement 1943, Italian troops in Durrës, Communist Partisans fighting in Tirana 1944, Partisans march through Tirana after occupying it 28 November 1944
Date	7 April 1939 – 23 January 1945 (5 years, 9 months, 2 weeks and 2 days)
Location	Albania
Result	LANÇ victory; Establishment of the Democratic Government of Albania

Belligerents
National Liberation Movement Balli Kombëtar (until 1943); Legality Movement (until 1943) Northern Epirus Liberation Front (United Kingdom) Special Operations Executive	Italy (until Sep. 1943): Albania (Italian protectorate); Germany (from Sep. 1943): Albania (German client); Balli Kombëtar (from 1943); Second League of Prizren (from 1943) Legality Movement (from 1943)

Commanders and leaders
Enver Hoxha; Spiro Moisiu; Mehmet Shehu; Haxhi Lleshi; Baba Faja Martaneshi; Vasileios Sachinis (executed); Grigorios Lambovitiadis (executed); (United Kingdom) Edmund Davies (POW); (United Kingdom) Arthur Nicholls †	(Kingdom of Italy) Victor Emmanuel III; (Fascist Italy) Benito Mussolini; (Fascist Italy) Francesco Jacomoni; (Fascist Italy) Alberto Pariani; (Fascist Italy) Renzo Dalmazzo; Shefqet Verlaci; Mustafa Merlika-Kruja; Maliq Bushati (executed); Eqrem Libohova; (Nazi Germany) Adolf Hitler; (Nazi Germany) Theodor Geib; (Nazi Germany) Hermann Neubacher; (Nazi Germany) Josef Fitzthum; Mehdi Frashëri; Rexhep Mitrovica; Fiqri Dine; Ibrahim Biçakçiu; Xhafer Deva; Midhat Frashëri; Ali Këlcyra; Idriz Gjilani; Abas Ermenji; Safet Butka ‡‡; Hysni Lepenica †; Kadri Cakrani; Skënder Muço (Note: defected to the LANÇ in 1943) (executed); Abaz Kupi; Ndoc Çoba

Strength
1942; ~4,000; 1944; ~40,000	More than 700,000 Axis troops were stationed

Casualties and losses
Around (including civilians) 28,000 killed 12,600 wounded 44,500 imprisoned or deported	Axis and collaborators: 26,595 killed 21,245 wounded 20,800 prisoners

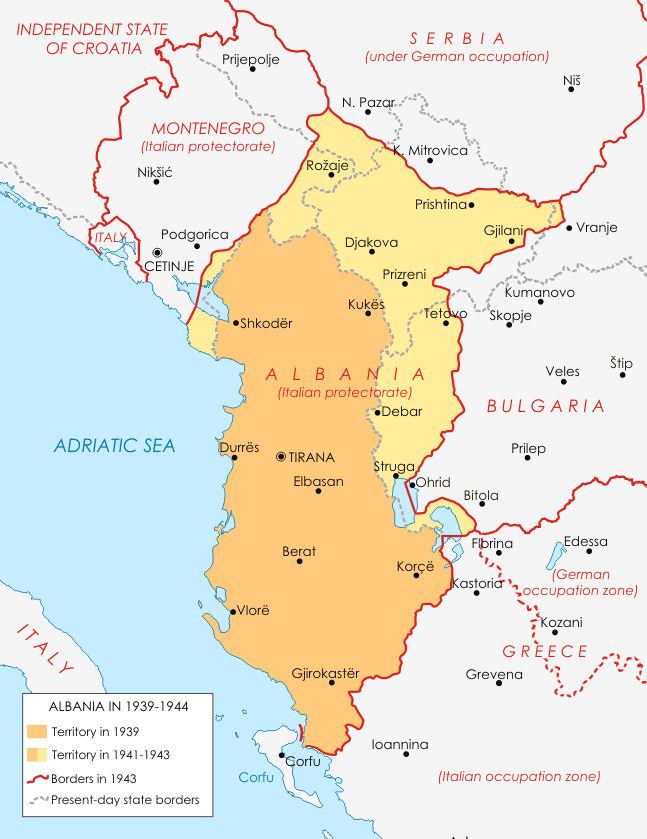
Map of Albania during World War II

In Albania, World War II began with its invasion by Italy in April 1939. Fascist Italy set up Albania as its protectorate or puppet state. The resistance was largely carried out by communist groups against Italy (until 1943) and then German occupation in Albania. At first independent, the communist groups united in the beginning of 1942, which ultimately led to the successful liberation of the country in 1944.

== Background ==
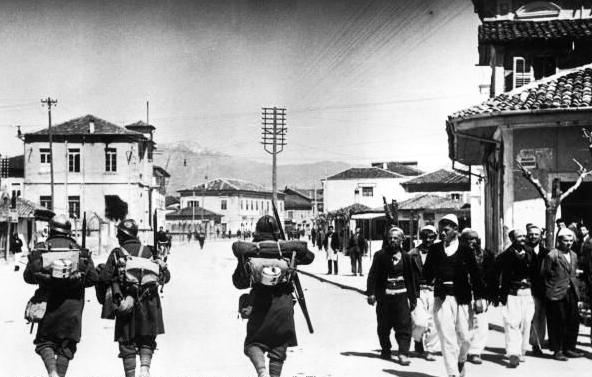
Italian soldiers in an unidentified location in Albania, April 12, 1939.

In 1938, Germany annexed Austria and moved against Czechoslovakia without notifying Italian dictator Benito Mussolini in advance, so he decided in early 1939 to proceed with his own annexation of Albania. Italy's King Victor Emmanuel III criticised the plan to take Albania as an unnecessary risk.

Italy, however, issued an ultimatum to the Albanian government on March 25, 1939, demanding that it accede to Italy's occupation of the country. King Zog refused to accept money in exchange for countenancing a full Italian takeover and colonisation of Albania, and on April 7, 1939, Mussolini's troops, led by General Alfredo Guzzoni, invaded Albania, attacking all Albanian ports simultaneously. There were 65 units in Sarandë, 40 at Vlorë, 38 in Durrës, 28 at Shëngjin and 8 more at Bishti i Pallës. The original Italian plans for the invasion called for up to 50,000 men supported by 137 naval units and 400 aircraft. Ultimately the invasion force grew to 100,000 men supported by 600 aircraft.

In Durrës, a force of only 360 Albanians—mostly gendarmes and townspeople—led by Abaz Kupi, the commander of the gendarmerie in Durrës, and Mujo Ulqinaku, a marine official, tried to halt the Italian advance. Equipped only with small arms and three machine guns, they succeeded in keeping the Italians at bay for several hours. Then a large number of small tanks were unloaded from Italian ships and resistance crumbled. Within five hours Italian troops had captured the city. By 1:30 pm on the first day, all Albanian ports were in Italian hands.

Unwilling to become an Italian puppet, King Zog, his wife, Queen Geraldine Apponyi, and their infant son Skander fled to Greece and eventually to London. On April 12, the Albanian parliament voted to unite the country with Italy. The Albanian parliament voted to depose Zog and unite the nation with Italy "in personal union" by offering the Albanian crown to Victor Emmanuel III. The Italians set up a fascist government under Shefqet Verlaci and soon absorbed Albania's military and diplomatic service into Italy's. On April 15, 1939, Albania withdrew from the League of Nations, from which Italy had resigned in 1937. On June 3, 1939, the Albanian foreign ministry was merged into the Italian foreign ministry. The Albanian military was placed under Italian command and formally merged into the Italian Army in 1940. Additionally, the Italian Blackshirts formed four legions of Albanian Fascist Militia, initially recruited from Italian colonists living in Albania, but later also from ethnic Albanians.

Upon invading, Galeazzo Ciano tried to reinforce an impression of benevolence with a number of initial gestures aimed more at public relations than at addressing any of Albania's profound social and economic problems. One of Ciano's first moves was to distribute food and clothing in some of the poor areas and to release political prisoners. He personally distributed 190,000 gold francs to the needy in Tirana, Shkodra, Vlora, Gjirokastra, Saranda, Korçë and Kukës. Because the money was given directly to the poor, bypassing the usual bureaucracy, it did some good. The Italians also contributed greatly to infrastructure, agriculture, and chrome and hydrocarbon exploration, in which Albania was rich. The Italians hoped that extensive investment in Albania would bring both economic and political benefits. Despite a weak domestic economy, Mussolini guaranteed the Albanians 22 million pounds over five years for economic development, considerably more than the 8.2 million Rome had spent since the early 1920s.

Initial reports of Italian activity were quite favourable. American journalist Ruth Mitchell commented at the end of April 1939, "What a great improvement there is in the condition of the people already. The whole atmosphere had become brisker and more enterprising; now at least there is hope." Even the German minister Eberhard von Pannwitz, perpetually critical of the Italians, commented favorably on the Italian tempo, which he likened to the tempo in Austria after its annexation by Germany. The new construction projects brought in large amounts of capital and employed many Albanians. The government began permitting Italians to take technical positions in Albania's civil service, and also began allowing Italian settlers to enter Albania. This largely affected the Albanians' attitude towards the Italian invaders and the locals greeted them with more respect and amity.

== Italian puppet state ==
In spite of Albania's long-standing protection and alliance with Italy, on 7 April 1939 Italian troops invaded Albania, five months before the start of the Second World War. The Albanian armed resistance proved ineffective against the Italians and, after a short defense, the country was occupied. On 9 April 1939, Zog I fled to Greece.

In an effort to win Albanian support for Italian rule, Galeazzo Ciano and the Fascist regime encouraged Albanian irredentism towards Kosovo and Chameria. Despite Francesco Jacomoni's assurances of Albanian support in view of their promised "liberation", Albanian enthusiasm for the war was distinctly lacking. The few Albanian units raised to fight during the developments of the Greco-Italian War (1940–1941) alongside the Italian Army mostly "either deserted or fled in droves". Albanian agents recruited before the war, are reported to have operated behind Greek lines and engaged in acts of sabotage but these were few in number. Support for the Greeks, although of limited nature, came primarily from the local Greek populations who warmly welcomed the arrival of the Greek forces in the southern districts.

One of Mussolini's plans for the Italian protectorate of Albania was to Italianize its citizens.

== Communist and Nationalist resistance ==
=== Origin of Communism ===
Faced with an agrarian and mostly Muslim society monitored by King Zog's security police, Albania's Communist movement attracted few adherents in the interwar period. In fact, the country had no fully-fledged Communist Party before World War II. After Fan Noli fled in 1924 to Italy and later the United States, several of his leftist protégés migrated to Moscow, where they affiliated themselves with the Balkan Confederation of Communist Parties and through it the Communist International (Comintern), the Soviet-sponsored association of international communist parties. In 1930, the Comintern dispatched Ali Kelmendi to Albania to organise communist cells. However, Albania had no industrial working class on which the communists could rely for support. Paris became the Albanian communists' hub until Nazi deportations depleted their ranks after the fall of France in 1940.

=== Enver Hoxha's and Mehmet Shehu's early years ===
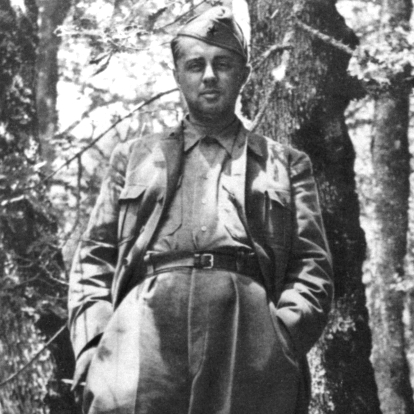
Enver Hoxha as a partisan

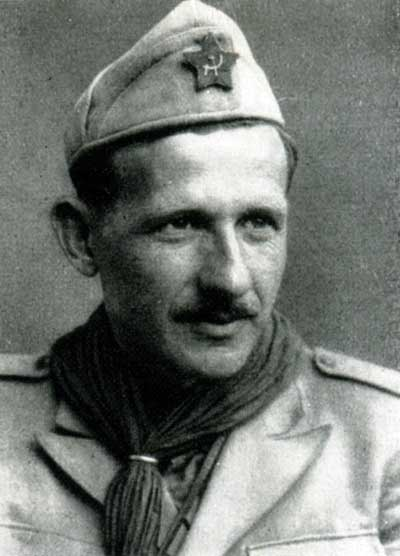
Mehmet Shehu as a partisan

Enver Hoxha and a veteran of the Spanish Civil War, Mehmet Shehu, eventually rose to become the most powerful figures in Albania for decades after the war. The dominant figure of modern Albanian history, Enver Hoxha rose from obscurity. Born in 1908 to a Tosk landowner from Gjirokastër who returned to Albania after working in the United States, Hoxha attended the country's best college-preparatory school, the National Lycée in Korçë. In 1930 he attended the university at Montpellier in France, but lost an Albanian state scholarship for neglecting his studies. He subsequently moved to Paris and Brussels. After returning to Albania in 1936 without having earned a degree, he taught French for years at his former lycée and participated in a communist cell in Korçë. He later went to Tirana and when the Albanian Communist Party was formed in November 1941, he was appointed as the general secretary of the party, a post he kept until his death in 1985.

Shehu, also a Tosk, studied at Tirana's American Vocational School. He went on to a military college in Naples but was expelled for left-wing political activity. In Spain Shehu fought in the Garibaldi International Brigade and became a commander of one of the brigade's battalions. After the Spanish conflict was over, he was captured and interned in France. He returned to Albania in 1942 and soon became a prominent figure. During the conflict, he won a reputation for his command abilities with the partisans. In his memoirs published in 1984, British Special Operations Executive David Smiley wrote:

"Mehmet Shehu was a short, wiry, dark sallow-faced man of about thirty who seldom smiled except at other people's misfortunes. He spoke good English, was very capable and had far more military knowledge than most other Albanians.... He had a reputation for bravery, courage, ruthlessness, and cruelty--he had boasted that he personally cut the throats of seventy Italian carabinieri who had been taken prisoner. I got along with him at first, for as soldiers we had something in common; but he did little to conceal his dislike for all things British, and my relations with him deteriorated."

=== Beginning of Albanian Communist and Fascist parties and National Liberation Movement ===
NLM flag (often seen without a star)

After the invasion of Albania by Italy in April 1939, 100,000 Italian soldiers and 11,000 Italian colonists settled in the country. Initially the Albanian Fascist Party received support from the population, mainly because of the unification of Kosovo and other Albanian-populated territories with Albania proper after the conquest of Yugoslavia and Greece by the Axis powers in the spring 1941. Benito Mussolini boasted in May 1941 to a group of Albanian fascists that he had achieved the Greater Albania long desired by Tirana nationalists. The Albanian Fascist Party of Tefik Mborja had strong support among the population after the Albania annexation of Kosovo.

Several groups were led by Baba Faja Martaneshi, former gendarmerie officer Gani bey Kryeziu, communist Mustafa Gjinishi, and rightist politician Muharrem Bajraktari. An attempt to unite those groups in one organization was undertaken by Major Abaz Kupi, by now a democratic politician, who created an underground organisation called the Unity Front. This front, which increased in numbers within several months, was crushed in April 1941 after the defeat of Yugoslavia and Greece. Some of its members passed over to the collaborationist camp, some were arrested, and some others fled to the mountains. The warfare ceased for a while.

In November 1941, the small Albanian Communist groups established an Albanian Communist Party in Tirana of 130 members under the leadership of Hoxha and an eleven-man Central Committee. The party at first had little mass appeal, and even its youth organisation netted few recruits.

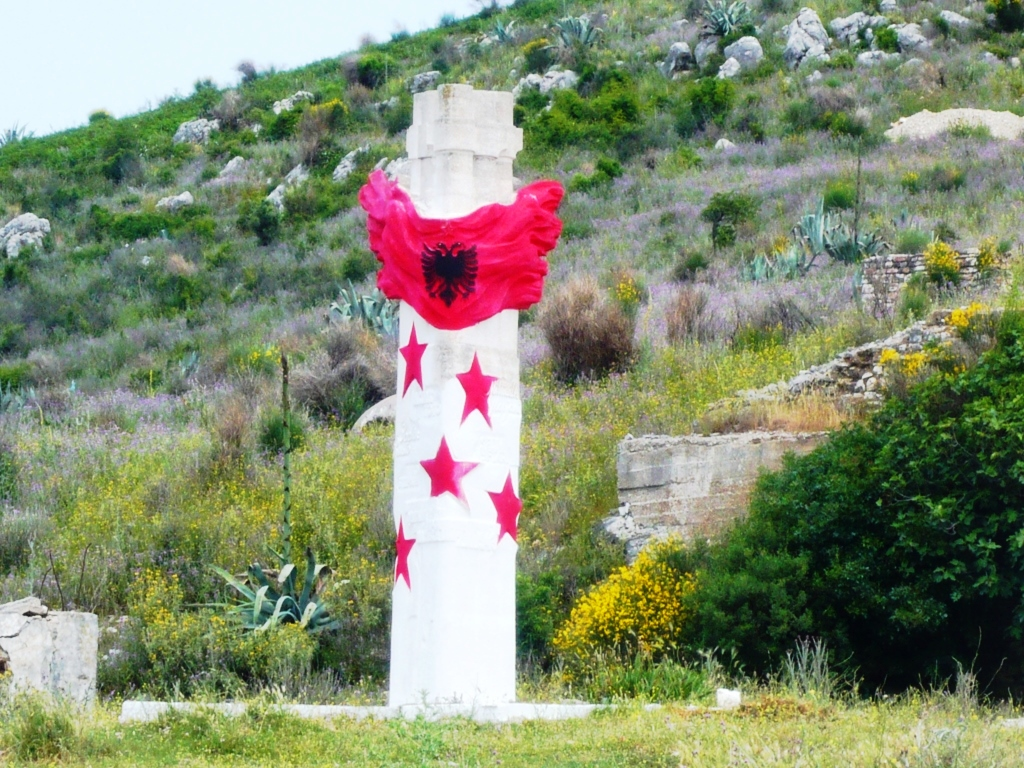
Lapidar commemorating partisan forces in Southeastern Albania

The resistance in Albania became active after the defeats of the Italian forces in the war with Greece, which started on 28 October 1940. Originally the slogan of building the "Greater Albania", into which the Italians promised to incorporate a substantial part of Greek Epirus (Cameria), allowed collaborationist authorities to mobilise several thousand volunteers for the army (besides regular troops). The collapse of the Italian offensive in Greece caused a crisis among the regular troops, who refused to take part in further fights, as well as in volunteer units, which dispersed; some soldiers made for the mountains. Eventually, the number of combat groups and partisan detachments, reinforced by deserters from the army, had grown to dozens, with over 3,000 men. In November in Lezhë, a town near the port of Shëngjin on Adriatic coast, mutinous soldiers who refused further service in Italian units fought a battle with an Italian punitive expedition, killing 19 and badly wounding 30 Italians, before retreating to the mountains. In the same month a partisan detachment laid an ambush for an Italian transport column en route to Gjirokastër. Several Italians were killed. On 17 May 1941 in Tirana a young man called Vasil Laçi attempted to assassinate king Victor Emmanuel III by shooting at him. However he failed and was shortly after executed.

In mid-1942, however, the Party called on young people to fight for the liberation of their country from Italy. This increased the number of new recruits by many young people eager for freedom. In September 1942, the party organised a popular front organisation, the National Liberation Movement (NLM), from a number of resistance groups, including several that were strongly anti-Communist. During the war, the NLM's Communist-dominated partisans, in the form of the National Liberation Army, ignored warnings from the Italian occupiers that there would be reprisals for guerrilla attacks. Such reprisals would elicit a desire for revenge, and new recruits.

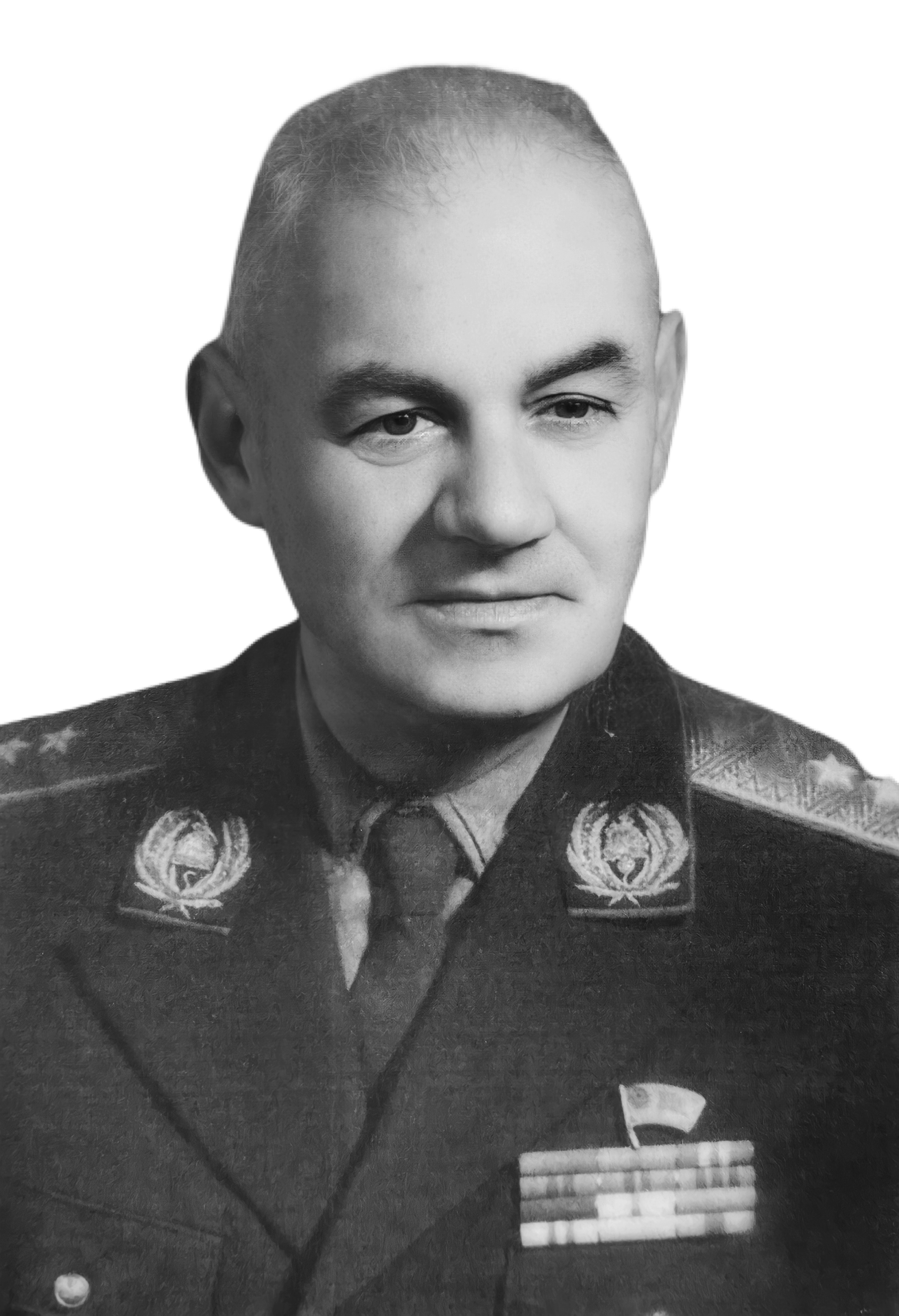
Major General Spiro Moisiu as military chief of the NLA.

On 17–22 February 1943 in the village of Labinot, the first nationwide conference of ACP took place. The estimation of the political and military situation in the country pointed to the need to create a homogeneous national liberation army. A decision concerning warfare tactics also was taken; it recommended that commanders of units conduct actions with bigger forces. On 17 May, twelve partisan detachments under the homogeneous command carried out an attack on the Italian garrison in Leskovik, which protected an important road junction. Partisans encircled the town in a tight ring and undertook the offensive. Over 1,000 Italians held the town. The battle lasted three days. The commander of the garrison had demanded air support, but before the support arrived, partisans seized the town. The Italians lost several hundred soldiers and considerable quantities of weapons and equipment. At the end of June the Italians started a punitive expedition against partisans in the region of Mallakastra and Tepelenë. Two thousand partisans took up defensive positions on mountain passes. In the first clash the Italians were forced back, but they renewed the action on 14 July with tanks, artillery and aircraft. After four days of fighting, the partisans had suffered heavy losses and retreated to higher parts of the mountains. In general from May to July the Italians lost thousands and many were wounded.

After March 1943, the NLM formed its first and second regular battalions, which subsequently became brigades, to operate along with existing smaller and irregular units. Resistance to the occupation grew rapidly as signs of Italian weakness became apparent. At the end of 1942, guerrilla forces numbered no more than 8,000 to 10,000. By the summer of 1943, when the Italian effort collapsed, almost all of the mountainous interior was controlled by resistance units.

The NLM formally established the National Liberation Army (NLA) in July 1943 with Spiro Moisiu as its military chief and Enver Hoxha as its political officer. It had 20,000 regular soldiers and guerrillas in the field by the end of that year. However, the NLA's military activities in 1943 were directed as much against the party's domestic political opponents, including prewar liberal, nationalist, and monarchist parties, as against the occupation forces.

=== Nationalist resistance ===
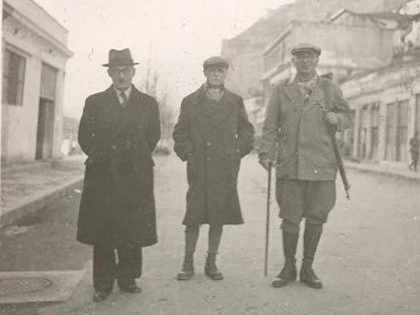
Balli Kombëtar leaders Ali Këlcyra, Mit'hat Frashëri, Thoma Orollogaj (from left to right) in Berat.

A nationalist resistance to the Italian occupiers emerged in October 1942. Ali Këlcyra and Mit’hat Frashëri formed the Western-oriented and anti-communist Balli Kombëtar (National Front). This movement recruited supporters from both the large landowners and peasantry. They supported the creation of Greater Albania by Italians and called for the creation of a republic and the introduction of economic and social reforms, opposing King Zog's return. Their leaders acted conservatively, however, fearing that the occupiers would carry out reprisals against them or confiscate the landowners' estates. The nationalistic Gheg chieftains and the Tosk landowners often came to terms with the Italians, and later the Germans, to prevent the loss of their wealth and power. The Balli Kombëtar, which had fought against the Italians, was threatened by the superior forces of the LNC and the Yugoslav Partisans, who were backed by the Allies.

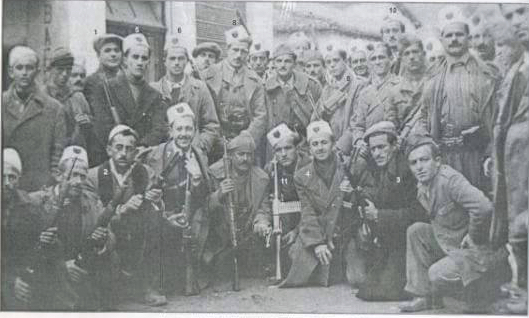
Balli Kombëtar forces in Debar

Among prominent Balli Kombëtar commanders were Safet Butka and Hysni Lepenica. Butka had been interned in Italy for two years until he was released in August 1942 and allowed to return to Albania. He then took to the mountains and became an outstanding leader of the Balli Kombëtar movement in the Korçë area. The nucleus of his guerrilla group, 70 seasoned and highly experienced fighters, could in an emergency become a thousand men strong. The Butka group had been giving valuable assistance to the fighters at Vlorë and had recovered from the military depots in the villages of Dardhe, Suli, Gračani, Progri, Pleshishti, and Verbinj all the agricultural production (corn, tobacco, wool, etc.) which the Italians had requisitioned and restored to its owners. His forces attacked Italians on Floq in January 1943, Vithkuq in March 1943.

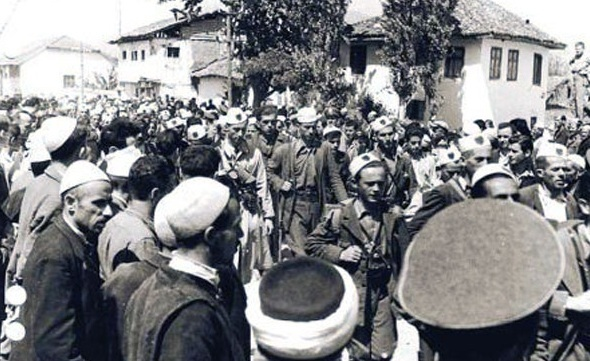
Balli Kombëtar forces enter Prizren 1944

The fighting that took place with general commander Hysni Lepenica during August 1942 in Dukat, Mavrovë, Vadicë, Drashovicë and Llakatund with the help of Allied aviation resulted in victory. After Italian capitulation, Communists and Ballists sought the peaceful surrender of all remaining Italian forces. However Hysni Lepenica, instructed by the Central Committee of the National Front, went to Gërhot, where the Italian division "Ferrara" was located to take their weapons as agreed with the division general, but after Tilman's intervention the division general attacked Lepenica's group. At the battle of Gjorm that resulted in a decisive victory for the Albanians and the death of Italian Colonel Clementi, Lepenica committed suicide when he heard that clashes between the Communists and Ballists had started. In the autumn of 1943, Nazi Germany occupied all of Albania after Italy was defeated. Fearing reprisals from larger forces, the Balli Kombëtar made a deal with the Germans and formed a "neutral government" in Tirana with which it continued its war with the LNC and the Yugoslav Partisans.

The Balli Kombëtar were also active in Kosovo and Macedonia. Their forces were mainly centered in Mitrovica, Drenica, and Tetovo. However the Balli Kombëtar in these regions were more aggressive than the Ballists of Albania.

With the Germans driven out by the Yugoslav Partisans, and the Albanian communists claiming victory in Albania, Yugoslav leader Josip Broz Tito ordered the collection of weapons in Kosovo and the arrest of prominent Albanians. This was not well received among Albanians. Combined with the passions felt about Kosovo, it inflamed an insurrection. On 2 December 1944, Ballists from the Drenica region attacked the Trepča mining complex and other targets. Similarly in Kičevo, Gostivar and Tetovo, the remaining Ballists tried to remain in control of the region after the Yugoslav Partisans announced victory. The insurrection was later crushed and Ballist leaders were either imprisoned, exiled or killed due to their co-operation with the Nazis. Ballists were also active in Montenegro and Sandžak fighting the Chetniks in the area.

=== Between Italian surrender and German occupation ===
With the overthrow of Benito Mussolini's fascist regime and Italy's surrender in 1943, the Italian military and police establishment in Albania buckled. Five Italian divisions were disarmed by the Germans, but many Italians soldiers evaded capture and flocked to the guerrilla forces; the sixth Italian division in Albania (41st Infantry Division Firenze) went over to the Resistance. The communists took control of most of Albania's southern cities, except Vlorë, which was a Balli Kombëtar stronghold, and nationalists attached to the NLM gained control over much of the north.

British agents working in Albania during the war fed the Albanian resistance fighters with false information that the Allies were planning a major invasion of the Balkans and urged the disparate Albanian groups to unite their efforts. In August 1943, the Allies convinced communist and Balli Kombëtar leaders to sign the Mukje Agreement that would coordinate their guerrilla operations. The two groups eventually ended all collaboration, however, over a disagreement on the postwar status of Kosovo. The communists supported returning the region to Yugoslavia after the war with the hope that Tito would cede Kosovo back to Albania peacefully, while the nationalist Balli Kombëtar advocated keeping the province.

==== Mukje agreement ====
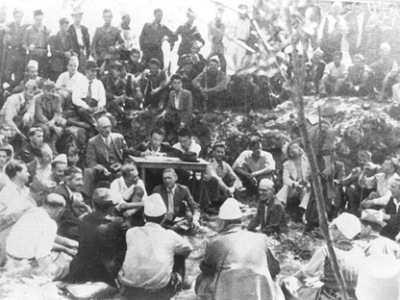
Communists and ballists converse during the Mukje agreement, August 2, 1943

The Mukje Agreement was a treaty signed on August 2, 1943, in the Albanian village of Mukje between the nationalist Balli Kombëtar and the communist National Liberation Movement. The two forces would work together in fighting off Italy's control over Albania. However, a dispute arose concerning Kosovo. Whereas the Balli Kombetar proposed to fight for the integration of Kosovo into Albania, the Communist representatives objected fiercely. The Balli Kombetar labelled the partisans traitors to Albania and often called them "Tito's dogs" while the partisans accused the Balli Kombetar of collaborating with the Axis powers, thus igniting a war between the two that lasted a year.

=== German occupation ===
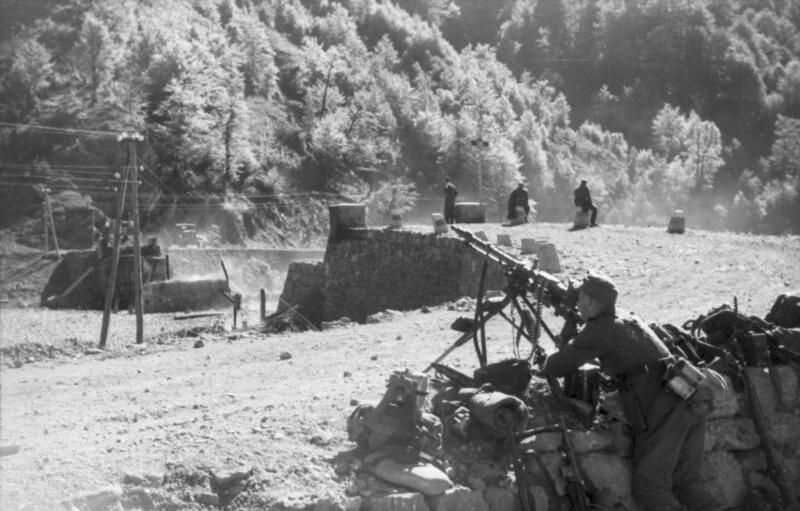
German checkpoint in central Albania, September 1943

After the neutral government was formed, Ballist forces in collaboration with Germans fought the Communists extensively. Balli Kombëtar captured Struga in Macedonia after defeating the partisan garrison.

Tirana was liberated by the partisans on 17 November 1944 after a 20-day battle. The partisans entirely liberated Albania from German occupation on 29 November 1944. The National Liberation Army, which in October 1944 consisted of 70,000 regulars, also took part in the war alongside the antifascist coalition. The Albanian partisans also helped in the liberation of Kosovo, and assisted Tito's communist forces in liberating part of Montenegro and southern Bosnia and Herzegovina. By that time, the Soviet Army was also entering neighboring Yugoslavia, and the German Army was retreating from Greece into Yugoslavia.

== Communist takeover ==
=== Provisional Communist administration ===
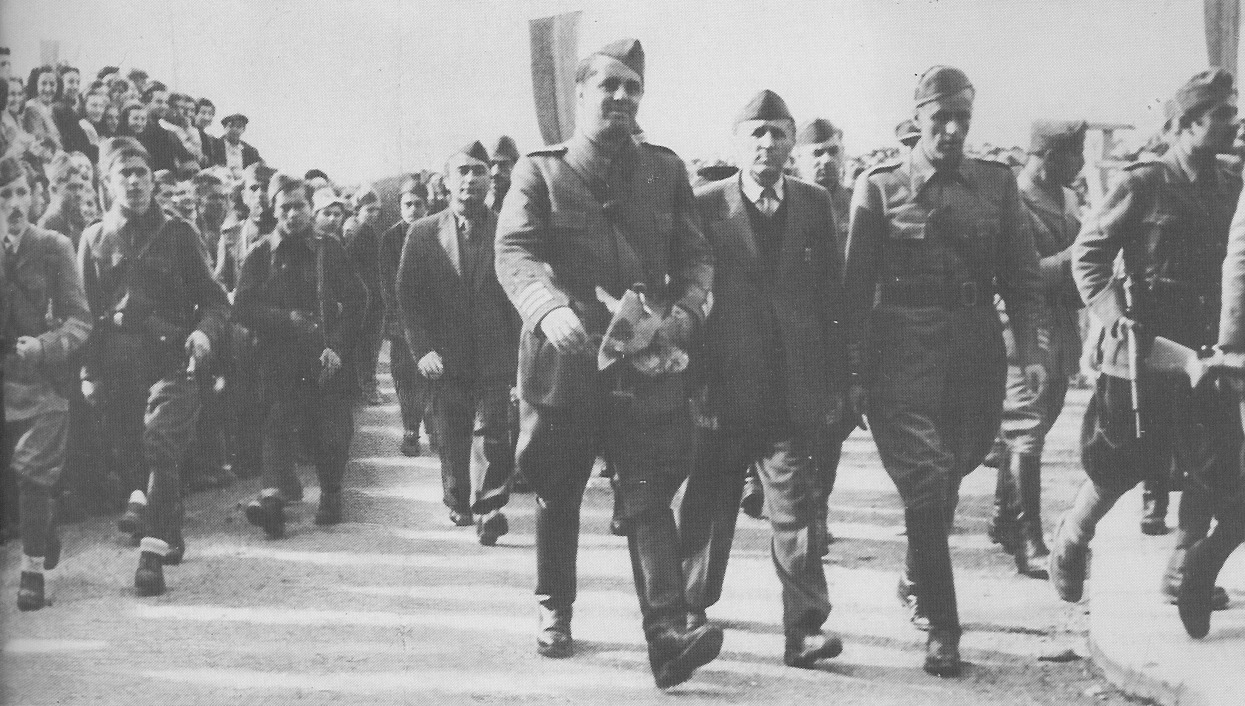
Partisans entering Tirana, November 28, 1944

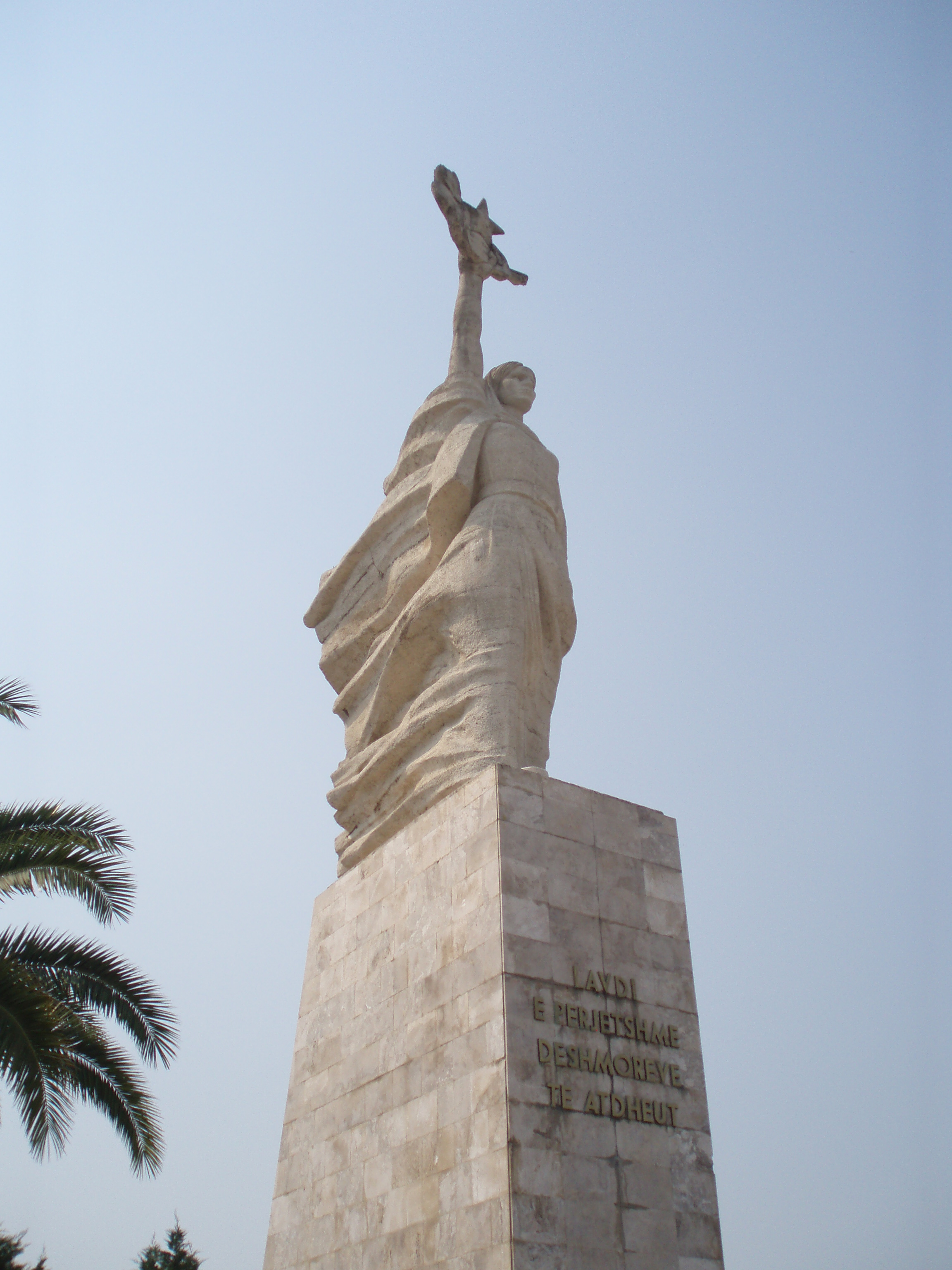
Mother Albania. The partisan monument and graveyard on the outskirts of Tirana, Albania.

The communist partisans had regrouped and gained control of much of southern Albania in January 1944. However, German attacks drove them out of certain areas until June. On May 29 the members of the National Liberation Front (as the movement was by then called) held the Congress of Përmet, which chose an Anti-Fascist Council of National Liberation to act as Albania's administration and legislature. Hoxha became the chairman of the council's executive committee and the National Liberation Army's supreme commander. The communist partisans defeated the last Balli Kombëtar forces in southern Albania by mid-summer 1944 and encountered only scattered resistance from the Balli Kombëtar when they entered central and northern Albania by the end of July. The British military mission urged the remnants of the nationalists not to oppose the communists' advance, and the Allies recalled their representatives with them to Italy. They did not evacuate nationalist leaders, although many fled.

Before the end of November, the main German troops had withdrawn from Tirana, and the communists took control by attacking it. A provisional government, which the communists had formed at Berat in October, administered Albania with Enver Hoxha as prime minister.

== Aftermath ==
Albania stood in an unenviable position after World War II. The NLF's strong links with Yugoslavia's communists, who also enjoyed British military and diplomatic support, guaranteed that Belgrade would play a key role in Albania's postwar order. The Allies never recognized an Albanian government in exile or King Zog and failed to raise the question of Albania or its borders at any of the major wartime conferences. No reliable statistics on Albania's wartime losses exist, but the United Nations Relief and Rehabilitation Administration reported about 30,000 Albanian war dead, 200 destroyed villages, 18,000 destroyed houses, and about 100,000 people left homeless. Albanian official statistics claim somewhat higher losses.

Furthermore, thousands of Cham Albanians were driven out of Greece and accused of collaborating with the Axis occupation forces.

During the Nazi occupation, most Jews in Albania proper were saved. During the Axis occupation of Kosovo, Albanian collaborators persecuted Serb and Montenegrin settlers. Between 70,000 and 100,000 were expelled or transferred to concentration camps in Pristina and Mitrovica while nearly 10,000 are estimated to have been killed by the Vulnetari and other Albanian paramilitaries.

== Foreign participation ==
There were a significant number of foreign citizens who participated in Albanian resistance during World War II. They were composed mostly of Italian soldiers who wished to continue the war against Nazi Germany, but other people from different nationalities participated also.

=== Italian participation ===
Albanian resistance began in 1940 with small çetas but it became a significant force in 1942. Even during this period there were small groups of Italian soldiers who deserted the fascist army and joined the Albanian partisans. When Italy capitulated in September 1943 there were already some 122 Italian partisans dispersed among various units in the Albanian National Liberation Army. When Italy capitulated there were some 100,000 Italian soldiers in Albania. They were from the Firenze, Parma, Perugia, Arezzo, Brennero divisions and other small independent units.

Many Italian forces surrendered to the advancing German army. Most of them were sent to concentration camps or for forced labour in Albania in the service of the German army, and there were also mass killings of Italian officers, mostly from the Perugia Division centred in Gjirokastër. Its general, Ernesto Chiminello, together with 150 officers, were executed in Saranda. Some other 32 officers were also killed in Kuç area three days later.

Some Italians took refuge in the mountains of Albania, while about 15,000 Italian soldiers surrendered to Albanian partisans. Some Italian troops led by Arnaldo Azzi, ex-commander of Firenze Division, created CITM, (Comando Italiano Truppe alla Montagna) (Italian Command of the Troops in the Mountains). Its objective was to resist German troops with help from the Albanian Partisans. They managed to create some units of Italian soldiers under their command, but these troops were dispersed in the months of October–November 1943, by the German winter offensive. The officers of this command were attached to British missions in Albania and were repatriated to Italy in August 1944.

There were also some 2,150 Italians who expressed their desire to continue the fight dispersed among Albanian partisan units. Some 472 Italian fighters were dispersed among Partisan shock brigades. A group of 137 men who created the Antonio Gramsci Battalion were attached to the First Shock Brigade and the Matteotti unit was attached to Third Shock Brigade. Some 401 were engaged in logistics roles and another 1,277 were attached to local commands. During the period 1943–1945 there were other units of Italian fighters among Albanian partisans, such as the 6th Battalion of the Fifth Shock Brigade, composed of some 200 Italians.

=== Wehrmacht deserters ===
Part of the German force which occupied Albania was composed of Wehrmacht recruits from the Caucasus region. The first Wehrmacht deserters went to Albanian Partisan units at the end of 1943 during the German winter offensive, but their numbers grew in the summer of 1944 during the German summer offensive. There was a great flow of Wehrmacht deserters during the end of conflict to Albania from September to October 1944 as German forces began withdrawing from Albania. In August 1944 a new unit was formed, Third Shock Brigade, from some 40 Wehrmacht deserters (mostly Armenians and Turkmen). Another 70 Armenians created their own unit attached to the First Shock Brigade in September 1944. There were also other small groups of Wehrmacht deserters dispersed among Albanian partisan forces, composed of Germans, Austrians, Frenchmen, Czechs and Poles.

=== Allied links and assistance ===
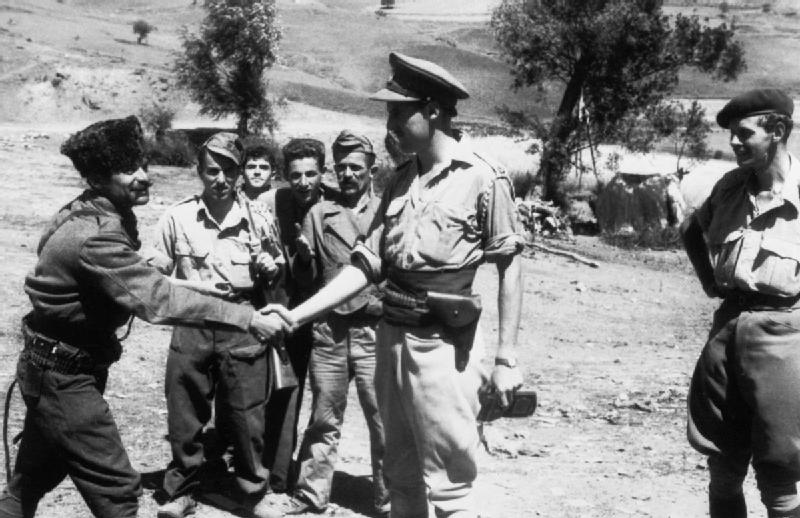
Xhelal Staraveçka shaking hands with Major Billy McLean at Shtylla, August 1943 during the first SOE mission to Albania. Behind them are Stilian and Stephan and, on the right, Major Peter Kemp.

The British had tried mounting liaison operations into Italian-occupied Albania in early 1941, from what was then neutral Yugoslavia. These attempts were quickly abandoned after the Germans and Italians overran Yugoslavia. Thereafter, no attempt was made to contact Albanian resistance groups until 17 April 1943, when M.O.4, a branch of the liaison organisation SOE, dispatched a mission commanded by Lieutenant Colonel "Billy" MacLean, with Major David Smiley as his second-in-command. Rather than drop "blind" into Albania, the mission was dropped into North-West Greece, where British parties were already operating with Greek guerrillas. From there, they made their way into Albania on foot or on mules.

After several false starts, the mission made contact with the NLM. The first supply drop of arms and equipment was received on 27 June. The bulk of the stores received in this and subsequent drops were donated to the NLM, who were the dominant group in Southern Albania, and were used to equip the "First Partisan Brigade".

Later in 1943, SOE increased the size of the mission to Albania. The new commander was Brigadier Edmund Frank Davies of the Royal Ulster Rifles (nicknamed "Trotsky" at Sandhurst because of the "disciplined bolshevism" in his character), with Lieutenant Colonel Arthur Nicholls as Chief of Staff. MacLean and Smiley were withdrawn to SOE's new base at Bari in southern Italy to report. Although they noted that the Communist-led NLM appeared to be more interested in securing political power after the war than fighting the Germans, they recommended that SOE continue to supply them, while attempting to achieve agreement between the NLM and the other resistance movements.

In January 1944, the Germans attacked and overran the British mission HQ. Brigadier Davies was captured, while Lieutenant Colonel Nicholls died of exposure and post-operative shock after leading the survivors to safety.

During the remainder of 1944, SOE continued to supply the NLM, despite complaints from MacLean and Smiley, now running liaison parties with Abaz Kupi's group and the Balli Kombëtar in northern Albania, that the NLM were using these arms against their political opponents rather than the Germans. Smiley, MacLean and Julian Amery were evacuated to Italy at the end of October. SOE refused to evacuate Abaz Kupi on the same boat. He made his own escape from the country, and picked up by a Royal Naval vessel in the Adriatic.

== See also ==
- Albania under Italy
- Besa tradition during World War II
- The Holocaust in Albania
- Participants in World War II
- Timeline of Albanian history
- Socialist People's Republic of Albania
- Antonio Gramsci Battalion
- Greco-Italian War
- Albanian Civil War (1943-1944)
- German winter offensive in Albania (1943-1944)

== Sources ==
- Library of Congress Country Study of Albania
- Bailey, Roderick (2008). The Wildest Province: SOE in the Land of the Eagle. London: Jonathan Cape. ISBN 9780224079167.
- Bailey, Roderick (2000). "OSS-SOE Relations, Albania 1943–44". Intelligence and National Security. 15 (2): 20–35. doi:10.1080/02684520008432601. S2CID 154196298.
- Bailey, Roderick (2002). "Smoke Without Fire? Albania, SOE, and the Communist 'Conspiracy Theory'". In Stephanie Schwandner-Sievers; Bernd J. Fischer (eds.). Albanian Identities : Myth and History. Bloomington: Indiana University Press. pp. 143–157.
- Julian Amery, (1948). Sons of the Eagle: A Study in Guerrilla War. MacMillan & Co Ltd London. This book from a British agent with the Royalists during the war has no ISBN but is being reprinted.
- Fischer, Bernd Jürgen (1999). Albania At War, 1939–1945. West Lafayette, IN: Purdue University Press. ISBN 978-1-55753-141-4.
- Fischer, Bernd J. (1991). "Resistance in Albania during the Second World War: Partisans, Nationalists and the S.O.E.". East European Quarterly. 25 (1): 21–43.
- Foot, M.R.D. (1984). The Special Operations Executive 1940–1946. Pimlico. ISBN 0-7126-6585-4.
- Manelli, Gani. "Partisan Politics in World War II Albania: the Struggle for Power, 1939–1944." East European Quarterly 40, no. 3 (2006): 333–348
- Pearson, Owen (2006). Albania in Occupation and War: From Fascism to Communism 1940–1945. Albania in the Twentieth Century. Vol. II. I.B. Tauris. ISBN 978-1-84511-104-5.
- Smiley, David (1984). Albanian Assignment. London: Chatto & Windus. Foreword by Patrick Leigh Fermor. The SOE in Albania by a brother-in-arms of Julian Amery and Neil "Billy" McLean. With numerous photographs.
- Smiley, David (1994). Irregular Regular. Norwich: Michael Russell. ISBN 0-85955-202-0. Translated in French in 2008. Au coeur de l’action clandestine. Des Commandos au MI6, L’Esprit du Livre Editions, (ISBN 978-2-915960-27-3). The Memoirs of a SOE officer in Albania and Thaïland (Force 136), then a MI6 agent (Poland, Albania, Oman, Yemen).
- Brigadier Edmund Frank "Trotsky" Davies. Illyrian venture: The Story of the British Military Mission to Enemy-occupied Albania, 1943–44, Bodley Head, 1952.
- Xan Fielding One Man in His Time – The life of Lieutenant-Colonel N.L.D. ("Billy") McLean, DSO, Macmillan, London, 1990. Biography of a soldier, SOE agent and Scottish politician.
- Albania in WWII by Julian Amery, from the Oxford Companion to the Second World War (1995), pp. 24–26
