= Kingdom of Albania (1943–1944) =

1943–1944 client state of Nazi Germany

Kingdom of Albania Mbretëria e Shqipërisë (Albanian) Königreich Albanien (German)
- 1943–1944
- Flag
- Motto: "Shqipëria Shqiptarëve, Vdekje Tradhëtarëve" "Albania for the Albanians, Death to the Traitors"
- Anthem: Himni i Flamurit; Hymn of the Flag
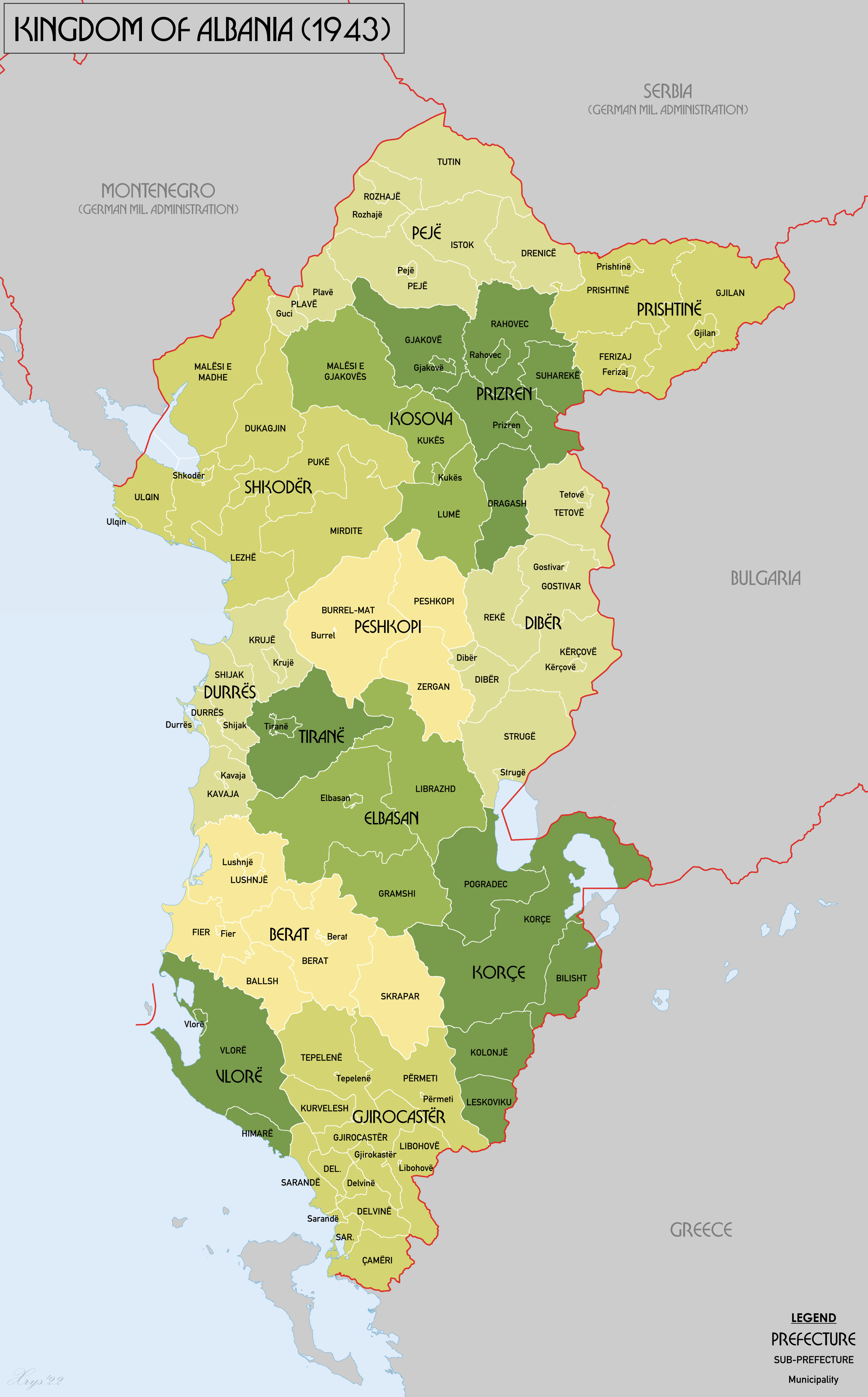
- The Albanian Kingdom 1943–1944
- Status: puppet state of Nazi Germany
- Capital: Tirana
- Common languages: Albanian; German
- Demonym: Albanian
- Government: Regent constitutional monarchy under military occupation
- Head of State
  - 1943: Ibrahim Biçakçiu (Note: As Chairman of the Provisional Executive Committee)
  - 1943–1944: Mehdi Frashëri (Note: As Chairman of the Provisional Administration Committee)
- Prime Minister
  - 1943–1944: Rexhep Mitrovica
  - 1944: Fiqri Dine
  - 1944: Ibrahim Biçakçiu
- Legislature: Regency Council
- Historical era: World War II
  - German takeover: 8 September 1943
  - Communist Takeover & Liberation: 29 November 1944

Area
- 1939: 28,748 km^{2} (11,100 sq mi)
- 1940–1943: 42,462 km^{2} (16,395 sq mi)

Population
  - 1939: 1,063,893
  - 1940–1943: 1,701,463
- Currency: Franga (1943–1944)
Preceded by	Succeeded by
Italian protectorate of Albania	Democratic Government of Albania; Democratic Federal Yugoslavia
- Today part of: Republic of Albania Republic of Kosovo Republic of North Macedonia Montenegro

Albania was a client state of Nazi Germany between 1943 and 1944 during World War II. Before the armistice between Italy and the Allied armed forces on 8 September 1943, Albania had been in a de jure personal union with and was de facto under the control of the Kingdom of Italy. After the armistice and the Italian exit from the Axis, German military forces entered Albania and it came under German occupation, creating a client-state called the Kingdom of Albania (Albanian: Mbretëria e Shqipërisë; German: Königreich Albanien) like the Italian protectorate and the pre-war monarchy.

The Germans favoured the nationalist Balli Kombëtar over King Zog's Legalists and the occupation was marked by collaboration between them and the Germans. Albania under German occupation retained control of the areas it had received during Italian rule, including most of Kosovo, as well as Western Macedonia, the town of Tutin in Serbia and a strip of Eastern Montenegro. It was the policy of the Balli Kombëtar to have all Albanian populated territories under one state.

== History ==
=== German invasion and construction of a German Albania ===
The occupation of Albania was necessary. We come to Albania not as enemy but as friends, and there is no reason you should be afraid. We shall leave Albania as soon as we consider necessary. We shall leave you free in all your internal affairs and shall not interfere with them. We ask for your obedience and those who do not obey will be punished.

— Maximilian von Weichs address to Albanians on 10 September 1943

=== An independent state of Albania ===
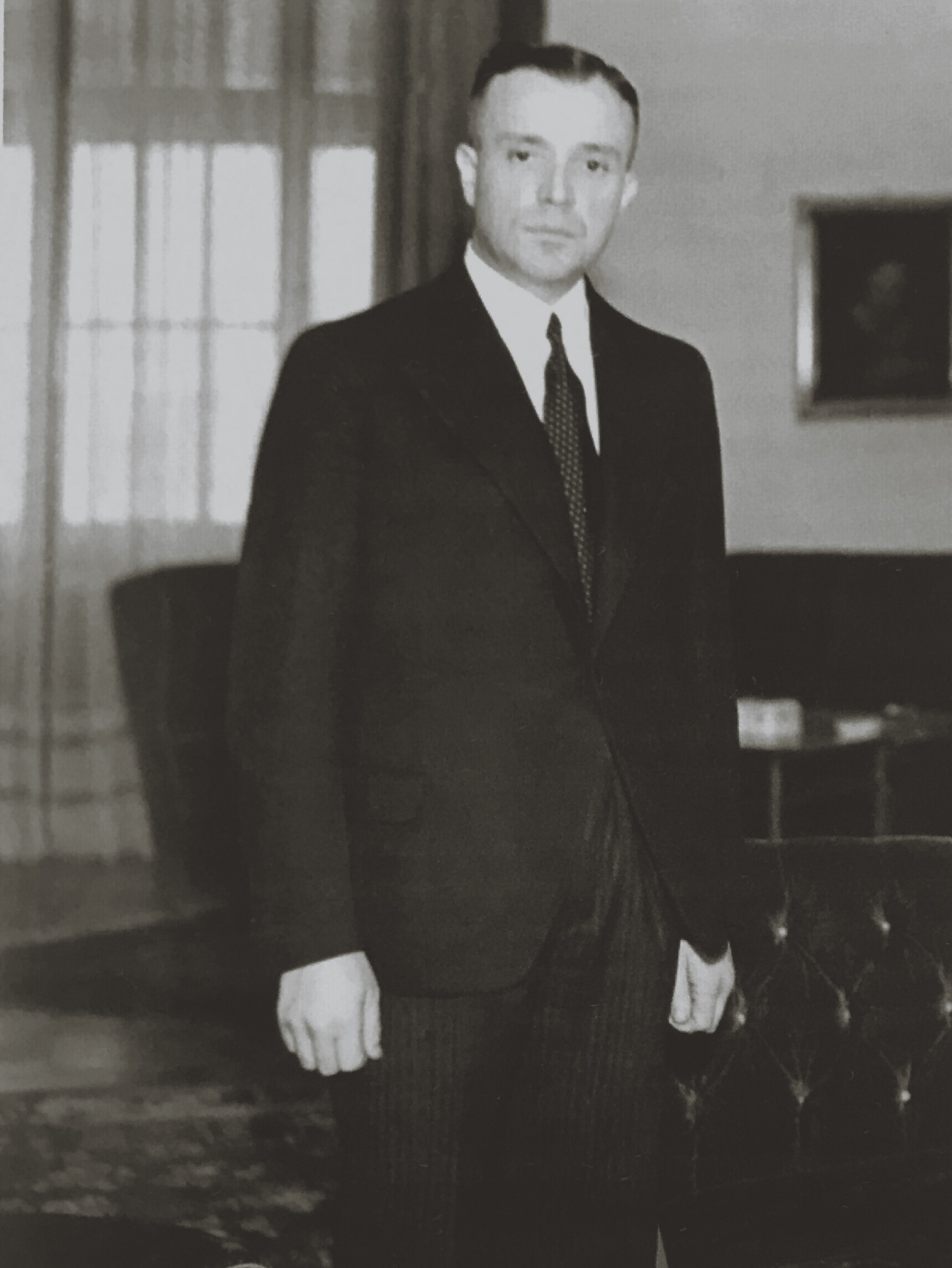
Ibrahim Biçakçiu was the Chairman of the Provisional Executive Committee from September 14 to October 24, 1943, and Prime Minister of Albania from September 6 to October 26, 1944, during the Nazi occupation.

German promises to preserve the 1941 borders of Albania, assurances of "non-interference" with the new Albanian administration and a general Pro-German outlook of most Albanians (dating from the years before and during the First World War where Austro-Hungarian foreign policies were supportive of an independent Albanian state), ensured that the new government initially enjoyed a large amount of support from the people.

In line with Neubacher's policies towards Albania, reprisals on the civilian population for attacks on the German army were uncommon and certainly not as brutal as in other occupied territories.

Soon after Ante Pavelic's Ustashi regime in Croatia extended their recognition to the Albanians.

=== Partisan resistance and Civil War ===
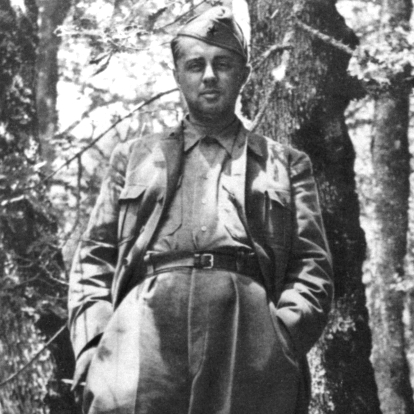
Enver Hoxha, leader of the Albanian partisans, at Odriçan, Gjirokastra, in 1944.

The first offensive, operation "505", started in early November 1943 to clear Partisan units from the Pezë region. The Balli Kombëtar was also involved in fighting the Partisans during the Winter offensive and by late winter the NLM came perilously close to being destroyed by the German and Nationalist forces. By then all prefectures of the new state, except Gjirokstra in the south, remained in the hands of the Albanian government. Enver Hoxha himself acknowledged that "the situation is difficult".

== Collaboration ==
=== Government ===
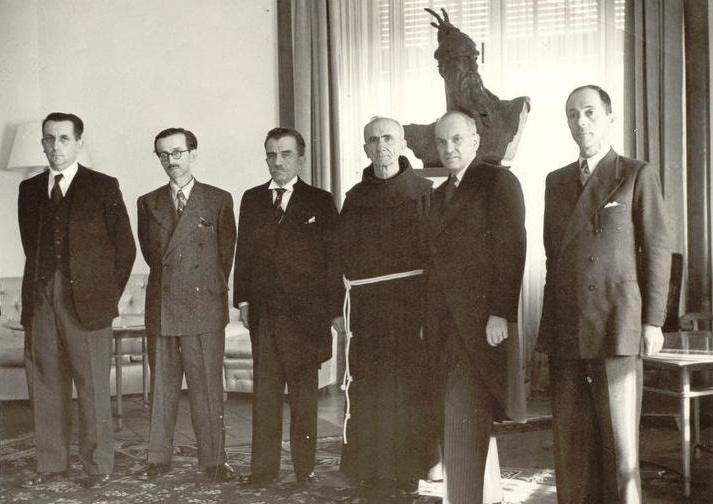
Members of Regency Council – From left to right: Fuat Dibra, Mihal Zallari, Mehdi Frashëri, Father Anton Harapi, Rexhep Mitrovica and Vehbi Frashëri

=== Military ===
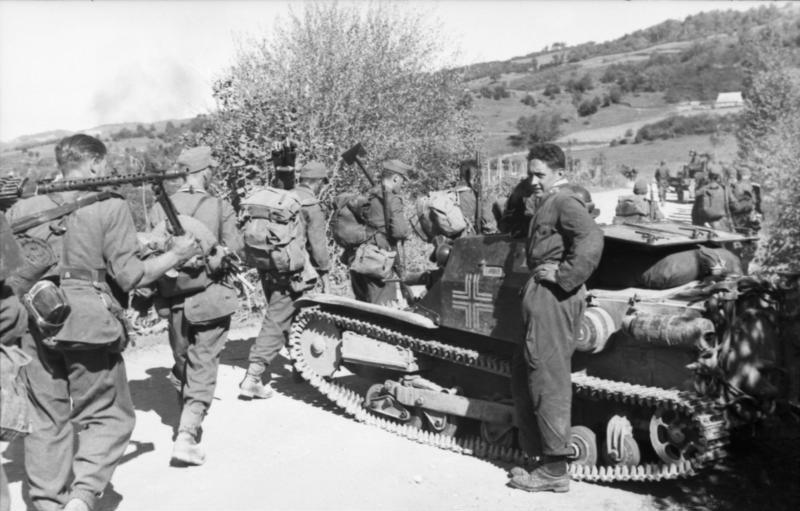
German soldiers next to an Italian tank in Tepelena, Albania in September 1943

In line with the German policy of "non-interference" and a desire to save their own troops for deployment elsewhere an Albanian Army commanded by General Prenk Pervizi was formed soon after the new government was set up. The Germans added to the strength of several units of the regular Albanian army and also increased the effectiveness of the gendarmerie. Many units which had collaborated with the Italians were preserved and subsequently utilised by the Germans in anti-partisan operations, with the staunchly anti-communist Balli Kombetar (National Front) also being used. By early November the newly established forces were engaged in fighting Macedonian and Albanian Partisan units in the town of Kicevo. After 7 days of fierce fighting, the Partisans were defeated and forced to retreat from the city. A volunteer militia known as the Vulnetari were also used as frontier guards of the re-organised Albanian state. Fighting in their own local areas (in Kosovo and Macedonia), they fought against both Partisans and Chetniks, "against whom they showed themselves skilled and determined fighters". This unit often carried out cross-border raids in Nedić's Serbia against civilian and military targets. The 21st Waffen Mountain Division of the SS Skanderbeg, established in April 1944, was better known for murdering, raping, and looting in predominantly Serbian areas than for participating in combat operations on behalf of the German war effort.

=== Police ===
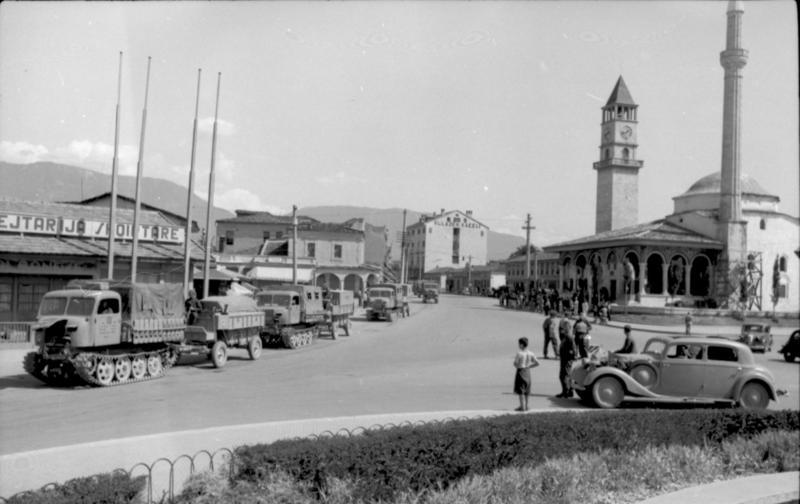
German column in Tirana

Xhafer Deva was the Minister of the Interior and therefore the head of the police and gendarmerie in the country. A native Kosovar Albanian and deemed the most "effective and reliable" by the Germans, Deva's forces were involved in targeting the internal enemies of the state. On 4 February 1944, police units under his authority were implicated in the massacre of 86 residents of Tirana suspected of being anti-fascists and other excesses committed by the Gestapo in collaboration with the Albanian gendarmerie. Large number of Serbs were killed across Kosovo or deported to camps in Albania starting from 1942. Roma (Gypsies) were also targeted by the gendarmerie and police force.

== Demographics ==
Using Italian estimates from July 1941, the population of the Albanian Kingdom was estimated at 1,850,000. The total population of "old Albania" (encompassing pre 1941 borders) stood at 1,100,000, while "new Albania" (consisting of Kosovo, Debar and parts of Montenegro) was 750,000. The Kingdom consisted of approximately 1,190,000 (64.3%) Muslims (Sunni and Bektashi) and 660,000 (35.6%) Christians (Catholic and Orthodox). The new state had two main minority groups, the Serbs of Kosovo and recent Italian Colonists scattered across Albania.

== Economy ==
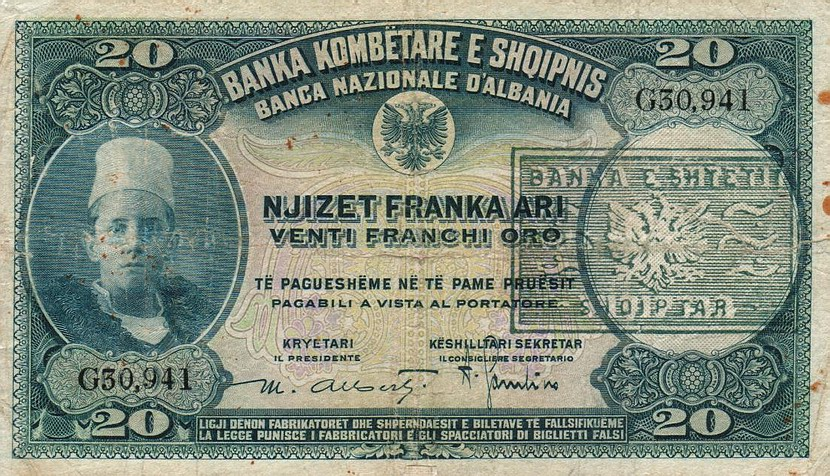
Albanian 20-franc note

=== Influences of Nazi Germany ===
In the Albanian Kingdom, which Nazi Germany formally treated as a sovereign state, much of the industrial and economic activity was either monopolised, or given a high priority for exploitation, by Germany. Almost all of the export companies operating were managed by the Germans, and mostly by the German military. The chrome ore, magnesite and lignite mines and the oilfields present across Albania were under direct German control.

The most important ore reserves for the Wehrmacht in Albania were chrome ore. Chrome was found both in Old Albania and in Kosovo. In the former, there were chrome ore deposits in Kukës, Klos and Pogradec. When the Germans entered the Kosovo region, there were functioning chrome mines in Gjakova and Letaj. From October 1943 to the end of August 1944 a total of 42,902 tons of chrome were extracted from these mines, of which 28,832 tons were exported to Germany. Magnesite mines in Golesh were also of significance. From mid September 1943 to the end of August 1944 an amount equalling 2,647 tons of processed and unprocessed Magnesite were exported to Germany. Aside from Romania, Albania was the only country in southeastern Europe that had substantial oil reserves. In Devoll roughly one million tons of crude oil were processed after the oilfields were up and running by May 1944.

=== Currency ===
The currency that was used during the German occupation was the Albanian Gold Franga.

== See also ==
- 21st Waffen Mountain Division of the SS Skanderbeg (1st Albanian)
- Albanian Resistance of World War II
- National Liberation Movement (Albania)
- The Holocaust in Albania

== Sources ==
- Dorril, Stephen (2002). MI6: Inside the Covert World of Her Majesty's Secret Intelligence Service. Simon and Schuster.
- Pearson, Owen (2006). Albania in the Twentieth Century, A History: Volume II: Albania in Occupation and War, 1939–45. I.B.Tauris. ISBN 9781845111045.
- Tomasevich, Jozo (2001). War and Revolution in Yugoslavia, 1941–1945: Occupation and Collaboration. Stanford, California: Stanford University Press. ISBN 978-0-8047-3615-2.
- Vickers, Miranda (2001). The Albanians: A Modern History. I.B.Tauris. ISBN 1860645410.
- Jürgen Fischer, Bernd (1999). Albania at War, 1939–1945. C. Hurst & Co. Publishers. ISBN 1850655316.
