= Third League =

Third League may refer to the following football leagues:

- Third League (Bulgaria)
- Third League of Estonia
- Montenegrin Third League
- TFF Third League of Turkey
- Ukrainian Third League

It may also refer to Third League of Prizren
