= Xhafer Deva =

Albanian collaborationist (1904–1978)

Xhafer Ibrahim Deva
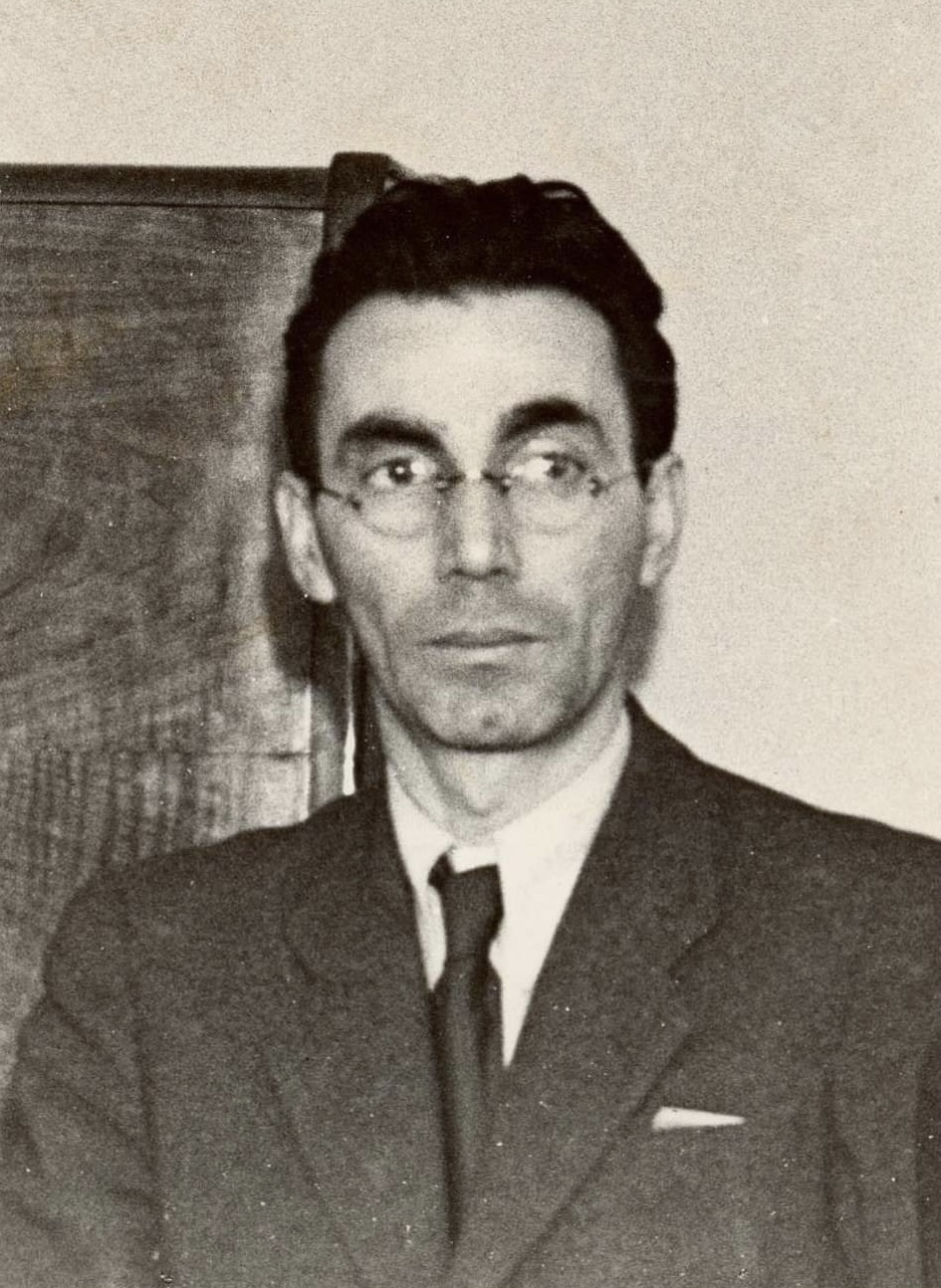

33rd Minister of Internal Affairs of Albania
- In office 5 November 1943 – 16 June 1944
- President: Regency Council
- Prime Minister: Rexhep Mitrovica
- Preceded by: Kol Bib Mirakaj
- Succeeded by: Fiqri Dine

Head of the local administration in Mitrovica
- In office 1941 – 5 November 1943

Personal details
- Born: 21 February 1904 Mitrovica, Kosovo Vilayet, Ottoman Empire
- Died: 25 May 1978 (aged 74) San Francisco, California, U.S.
- Party: Balli Kombetare
- Occupation: Merchant; Entrepreneur; Politician

Military service
- Allegiance: (Albania) Albanian Kingdom (1943–44); Central Intelligence Agency

Xhafer Deva (21 February 1904 – 25 May 1978) was a nationalist Kosovo Albanian collaborationist politician during World War II. A notable local politician in Kosovo and in Axis-occupied Albania, he took charge of German-occupied Mitrovica and worked with the Germans to establish a pro-German Albanian government in Kosovo. Following the capitulation of Italy from the war, he helped form a provisional government under German occupation and set up the Second League of Prizren alongside other Albanian nationalists.

In November 1943, he was appointed Minister of the Interior and was effectively given direct command of the forces of the newly formed Albanian government. On 4 February 1944, police units subordinate to him massacred 86 residents of Tirana suspected of being anti-fascists. Deva was later involved in recruiting Kosovo Albanians to join the 21st Waffen Mountain Division of the SS Skanderbeg (1st Albanian). He lost his position as Minister of the Interior with the dissolution of the Albanian government on 16 June, and subsequently became leader of the Second League of Prizren and led anti-Partisan operations around Prizren in September. Soon after, he fled to Croatia and then to Austria with the help of the Germans, where he joined other anti-Communist Albanians.

After the war, he moved via Italy to Damascus, where he helped publish an exile newspaper entitled Bashkimi i Kombit (Albanian: Unity of the Nation). In 1956, he immigrated to the United States and briefly lived in New York and Boston before moving to Calaveras County, California in 1960. He worked as an assistant supervisor at the mailing department of Stanford University in Palo Alto until his retirement in 1972. During this time, he led the Third League of Prizren and played an active role in organizing anti-Communist resistance until his death on 25 May 1978. Files released after his death showed that he had been recruited by the Central Intelligence Agency (CIA) while living in the United States.

== Early life ==
Xhafer Ibrahim Deva was born in Mitrovica, Kosovo Vilayet, Ottoman Empire on 21 February 1904. He was the seventh son of Ibrahim Deva, a wood merchant from Gjakova. Prior to the Balkan Wars, he attended a German-language school in Salonika. Afterwards, he studied commerce at Robert College, an American private boarding school in Istanbul's Arnavutköy neighborhood. He graduated in 1922 and traveled to Egypt, where he briefly worked for a bank in Alexandria. Suffering from rheumatism, he left Egypt and sought treatment in Austria. He studied forestry in Vienna before returning to Mitrovica in 1933 and setting up a lumber business that lasted until 1941.

== World War II ==
The Kingdom of Italy invaded the Albanian Kingdom on 7 April 1939, and deposed its monarch, King Zog I. Afterwards, they re-established the Albanian state as a protectorate of the Kingdom of Italy,

By 1941, Deva was the first Kosovo Albanian political leader to declare himself ready to collaborate with the Germans in the event of the Axis invasion of Yugoslavia. Having been in contact with the Abwehr (the German military intelligence) for some time, he met Hermann Neubacher, the German special representative for southeastern Europe, in Belgrade prior to the invasion and had given the latter his support.

The Axis powers invaded the Kingdom of Yugoslavia on 6 April 1941. Afterwards, the country was dismantled and the Wehrmacht established the Territory of the Military Commander in Serbia under a military government of occupation. The territory included most of Serbia proper, with the addition of the northern portion of Kosovo and the Banat. Italian Albania was expanded to include adjacent parts of Yugoslavia incorporated mainly from the Yugoslav banovinas (regional subdivisions) of Vardar and Morava. Most of Kosovo was annexed to Albania and in the beginning Albanians living there enthusiastically welcomed the Italian occupation. Although officially under Italian rule, the Albanians controlled the region and were encouraged to open Albanian language schools, which had been banned by the Yugoslav government. The Italians also gave the inhabitants Albanian citizenship and allowed them to fly the Albanian flag.

On April 26 Deva organized a meeting between Albanian representatives from Kosovo and south Sandžak with German general Friedrich-Georg Eberhardt about organization of 'new order'. Eberhardt demanded that new municipal governments have to be formed and claim that Adolf Hitler will probably allow cleansing of Serbs from these areas, but any radical actions shouldn't be rushed. Later that year, Deva worked with the Balli Kombëtar and the Germans to establish a pro-German Albanian government in Kosovo linked to the Albanian nation. He quickly became the Balli Kombëtar's most powerful figure. The most capable Kosovo Albanian politician of the war, he was then appointed head of the local administration in German-occupied Mitrovica. After the capitulation of Italy, Deva and Bedri Pejani, assisted by the German emissary Franz von Schweiger, set up the Second League of Prizren on 16 September 1943. The league, whose aim was to defend the borders of Greater Albania, declared jihad (holy war) against Slavs, Gypsies and Jews and sought to create an ethnically cleansed Greater Albania. Between 4 and 7 December 1943, 400 soldiers of Kosovo Regiment commanded by Deva surrounded Peja and committed mass murder of local Serbs and Montenegrins, killing at least 300 people. Deva subsequently placed the newly established units of Balli Kombëtar under the command of the Germans.

Together with Pejani and Ibrahim Biçakçiu, a landowner from Elbasan, he later helped create a national committee of twenty-two Albanian and Kosovo Albanian leaders which declared Albania independent and which elected an executive committee under Biçakçiu to form a provisional government. On 5 November, Deva was appointed Minister of the Interior in the Tirana Government of Rexhep Mitrovica and collaborated with the Germans to oppose the spread of Communist forces in the north, effectively giving him direct command over the forces of the new government.

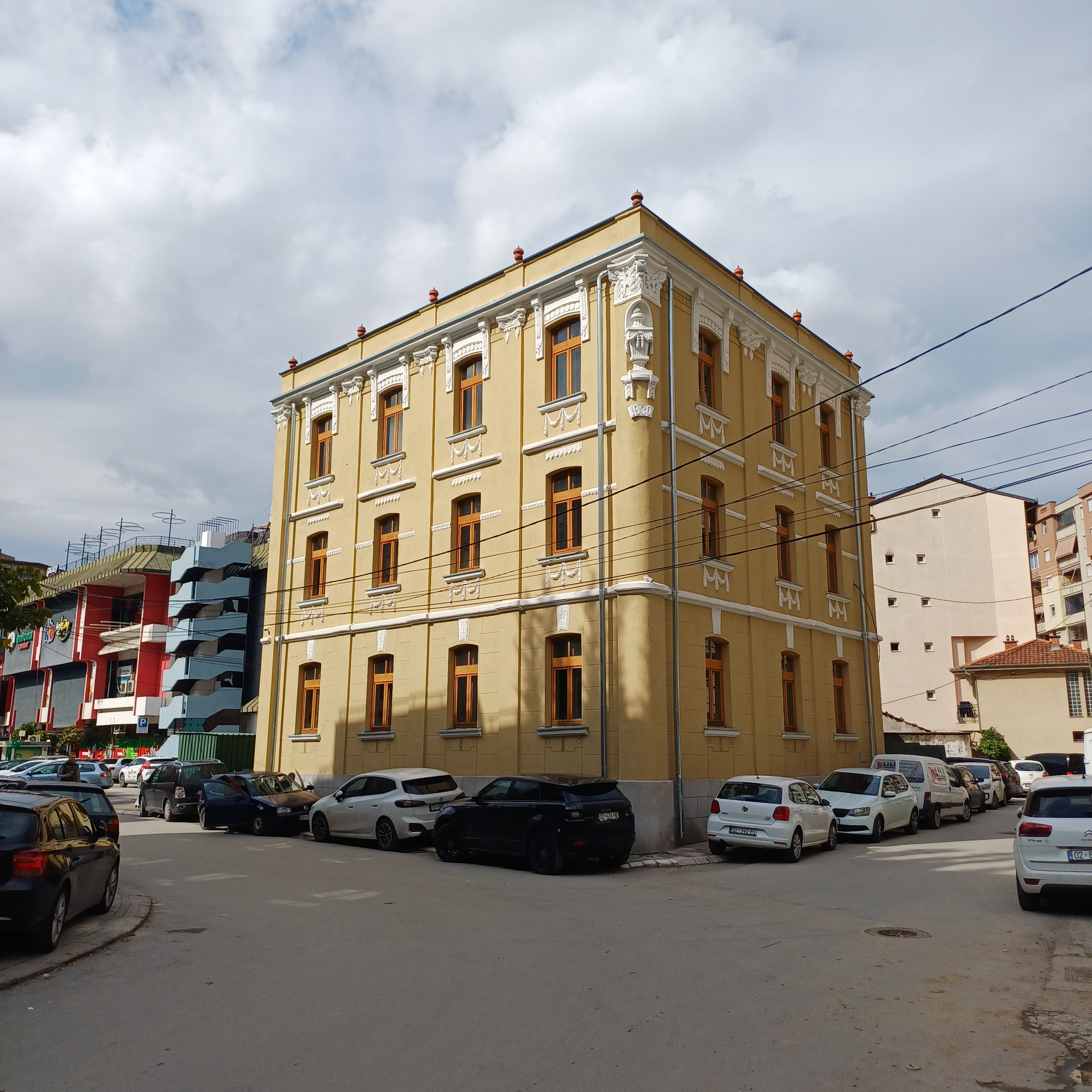
Xhafer Deva's house in Mitrovica after renovation

On 4 February 1944, police units under his authority massacred 86 residents of Tirana suspected of being anti-fascists. Later, Deva began recruiting Kosovo Albanians to join the SS Skanderbeg. Previously, in 1943 in Novi Pazar, after invitation from mayor Aćif Hadžiahmetović, he popularized recruition in SS Handschar. In May, he visited Germany with Ago Agaj, the Albanian Minister of National Economy. On 16 June, Mitrovica's government was dissolved and Deva lost his position as Minister of the Interior. He was then appointed leader of the Second League of Prizren, and took charge of anti-Partisan operations around the town in September.

With the Allied victory in the Balkans imminent, Deva was also involved in a last-ditch attempt to set up an anti-Communist government in Kosovo, and received large caches of weapons and ammunition from SS General Josef Fitzthum and Neubacher's special representative, Karl Gstottenbauer. For similar reasons Deva and other Albanian collaborators agreed to an alliance with Chetniks of Draža Mihailović in mid-1944, when he met with Tihomir Šarković, representative of Mihailović. He and his men also engaged in collecting food and radio equipment from withdrawing German soldiers and attempted to purchase further weapons from them in order to organize a "final solution" of the Slavic population of Kosovo. Nothing came of this as the powerful Yugoslav Partisans prevented any large-scale ethnic cleansing of Slavs from occurring. According to German reports from November 1944, Deva had a force of about 20,000 armed men at his disposal. Historian Jozo Tomasevich writes that this number is likely exaggerated, but concedes that large groups of Kosovo Albanians were active in the region at the time.

Historical review of Deva's role in World War II has become more complicated as, while his atrocities and collaboration with the Axis continue to be acknowledged and condemned, his role in saving Jews within Albania proper has also come to light. In the spring of 1944, the German occupiers again asked for a list of Jews, which had earlier been refused by Albanian collaborationist authorities; upon hearing the grave situation, two of the local Jewish leaders sought the council of Mehdi Frasheri, a government official, for help; Frasheri referred them to Xhafer Deva, who apparently on the one hand had a "good reputation for protecting Jews" yet on the other "had become known for the terror he exercised across the streets of Tirana along with his hordes". Xhafer Deva, then the interior minister of the Albanian quisling government, reportedly told two Jewish delegates that he had the list, and agreed that he would protest the matter with the Germans. He refused to hand the list over to the Germans and rejected their requests to gather Jews in one place, purportedly because of the Albanian besa custom of hospitality. To the Germans, Deva argued that he would not hand over the list as he would not accept "interference in Albanian affairs". Deva informed the leaders of the Jewish community that he had successfully refused the German request afterward. In June 1944, the German authorities asked for the list of Jews again, and the Albanian collaborationist government refused yet again.

== Exile and death ==
As the war in Albania drew to a close, Deva fled to Croatia and then to Austria in December, where he was resettled with the help of the Reich Foreign Ministry as the Germans evacuated Albania and Kosovo. There, he joined other anti-Communist Albanians in exile and took care of the ailing Rexhep Mitrovica. From late 1945 until early 1947, he lived in western Austria, at a safe distance from Soviet forces. In 1947, Deva moved via Italy to Damascus in Syria, where he helped publish an exile newspaper entitled Bashkimi i Kombit (Albanian: Unity of the Nation). In 1956, he immigrated to the United States and briefly lived in New York and Boston. In 1960, he moved to Calaveras County, California, and worked as an assistant supervisor at the mailing department of Stanford University in Palo Alto until his retirement in 1972. In his years in exile, Deva led the Third League of Prizren and played an active role in organizing anti-Communist resistance. He died on 25 May 1978, aged 74.

== Legacy ==
Files released after his death showed that Deva was one of 743 suspected fascist war criminals recruited by the Central Intelligence Agency (CIA) during the Cold War.

In February 2022, it was announced that the United Nations Development Programme and the European Union would help finance the restoration of Deva's former home in Mitrovica. The decision was condemned by Serbian Culture Minister Maja Gojković, Germany's ambassador to Kosovo, Joern Rohde, as well as Efraim Zuroff, the director of the Simon Wiesenthal Center. In response to the criticism, the UNDP and EU decided to withdraw funding for the project.
