= Abaz Kupi =

Albanian military officer (1892–1976)

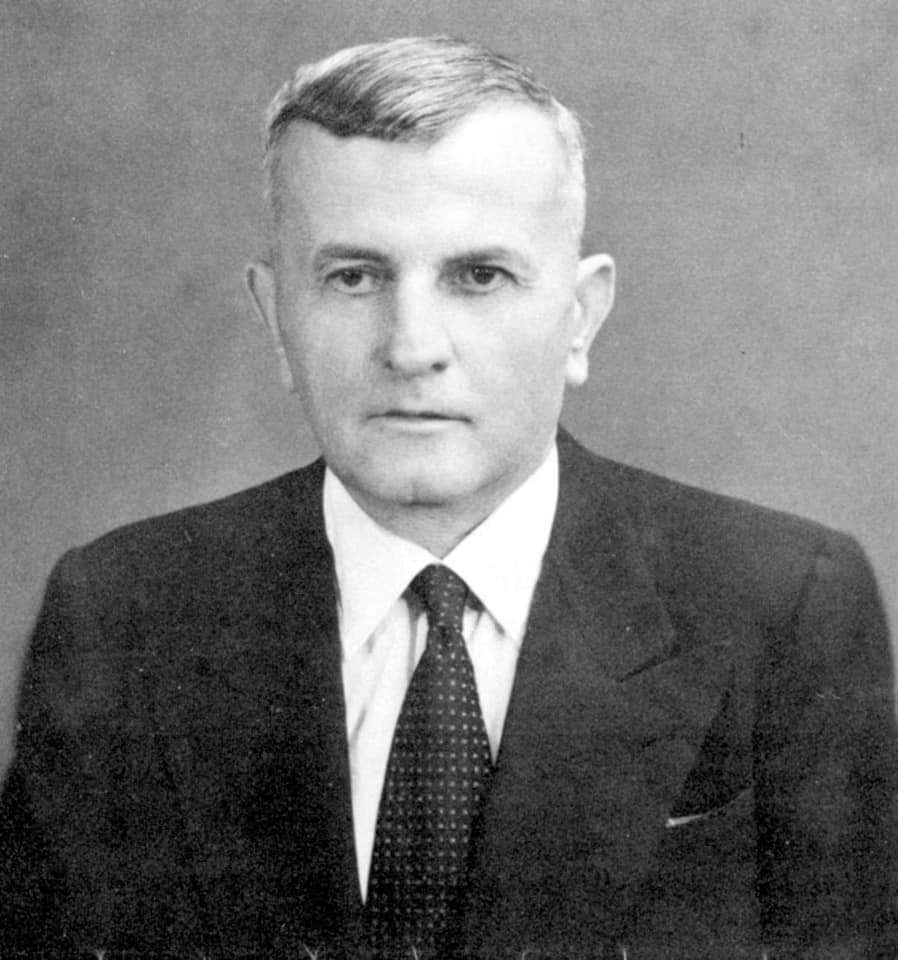
- Abaz Kupi

Founder of the Legaliteti movement

Personal details
- Born: 6 August 1892 Akçahisar, Ottoman Empire (modern-day Krujë, Albania)
- Died: 17 January 1976 (aged 83) New York City, U.S.
- Party: Legaliteti
- Children: Petrit Kupi
- Occupation: Soldier Politician

Abaz Kupi (6 August 1892 – 17 January 1976; also rendered Abas Kupi) was an Albanian military officer.

Kupi was born in Krujë. He served as commander of the gendarmerie of the town of Kruja, and later of the town of Durrës. As a royalist, he created the Legality Movement in Albania, which promoted the return to the throne of Zog of Albania. During the Cold War Kupi was a member of the Free Albania National Committee, which intended to overthrow the communist regime in Albania and to return the monarchy.

He was later awarded the Military Order of Bravery (Brave Class).

== Early life ==
He was born on 6 August 1892, in the Varosh neighbourhood of Akçahisar, the Ottoman Empire (now Krujë, Albania). Between 1913 and 1918 he entered the service of Essad Pasha Toptani. In 1922 he took part in the coup d'état of Elez Isufi that attacked Tirana to overthrow the government,but the rebels were defeated by Captain Prenk Pervizi and his soldiers who had come to the aid of Ahmet Zog, who was then Minister for the Interior. British Ambassador Harry Charles Augustus Eyres persuaded Elez Isufi to return to Dibra.

During the revolution of 1924, Abaz Kupi remained neutral and, when Ahmet Zogu returned, his friend Prenk Pervizi introduced him to Zogu, who made him head of the gendarmerie of Kruja with the rank of captain.

During the Italian invasion of Albania in 1939, Kupi had the rank of major and was based in Durrës. However, he was not able to organize the defence of the city and had to flee before he was captured by the Italians. With the Italian invasion complete, Kupi moved to Turkey, where he remained until there was a new opportunity to fight the Italians. His family was deported to the south of Italy.

== World War II activity ==
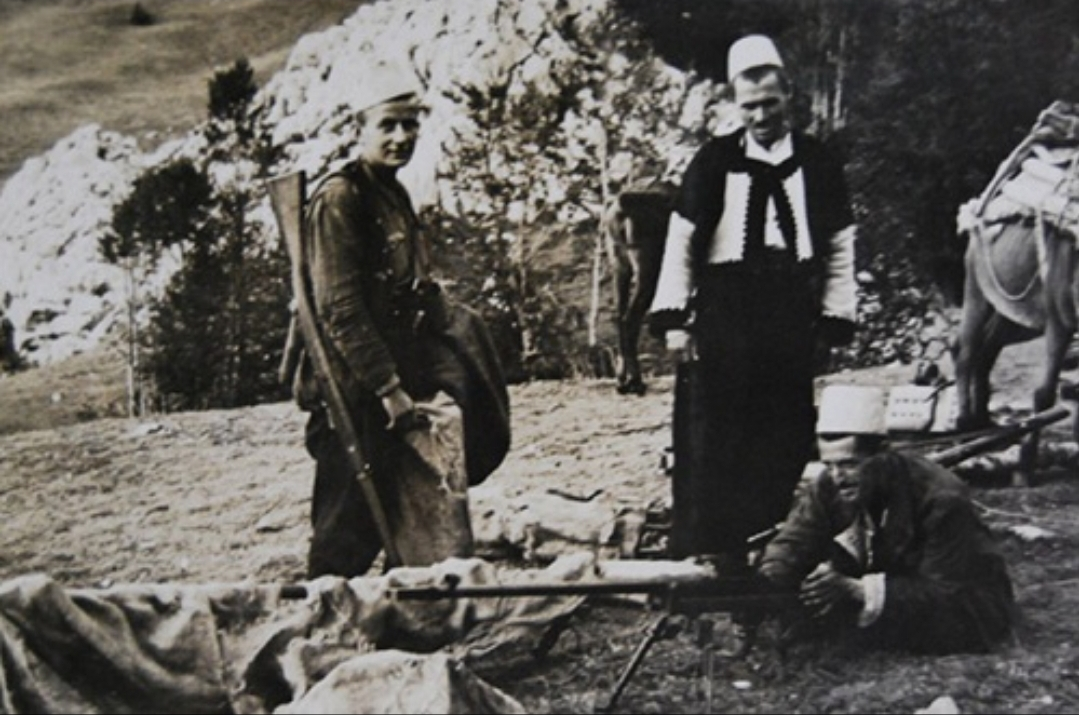
Commander Abaz Kupi (center), alongside paramilitaries from the monarchist group, Legaliteti.

During World War II the British forces were looking into possibilities of creating an antifascist resistance in Albania. At the time the possible candidates for this role in Albania were Muharrem Bajraktari, Prenk Pervizi, Hysni Dema, Fiqri Dine, Gjon Markagjoni, Myslym Peza and Mustafa Gjinishi (the latter two were communists). Abaz Kupi departed Turkey and wanted to go to Albania with the intention of leading the resistance. The Yugoslav government was against such an action, but when a German attack on Yugoslavia became imminent it gave the green light.

In April 1941, a small group led by Abaz Kupi, Xhemal Herri, Gani Kryeziu and Mustafa Gjinishi, with the support of Muharrem Bajraktari, entered Albania from the Yugoslav frontier. Because of limited supplies and a lack of coordination, the expedition was trapped in the mountainous regions of northern Albania and failed to meet its objectives. In 1943 Captain Xhemal Herri, chief of secret services for King Zog, was killed by Abaz Kupi in Kruja in unclear circumstances.This crime was seen as a great shame and indelible stain on Kupi.

Abaz Kupi collaborated with the communists and was elected a member of the General Council of the National Liberation Movement (known as LANÇ). Kupi participated with the communists in the 1943 Mukje Conference organized by the Balli Kombëtar (National Front). Soon after the conference, he was forced to leave the communists (National Liberation Front) and created the Legality Movement, which wanted to see the return of King Zog to Albania. Apart from some sporadic fighting in September 1943 in Krujë (while he was still with the communists), Kupi's forces did not attack German troops, although pressed to do so by the British mission, which was working with them. The British mission was protected by General Prenk Pervizi, one of the most important nationalist leaders and head of the Albanian army. When the Albanian communists' First Storm Division attacked in northern Albania from August to October 1944, the British mission left Albania. Anti-communist leaders fled to the mountains as agreed with the Allies. But Kupi left Albania by ship and was captured by the Italians and put in prison in Ancona.

== Postwar activities ==
After his arrival in Italy, Kupi was liberated by Allied troops from Ancona prison and then placed in a refugee camp. Meanwhile, the communists had taken over in Albania, pushing several important nationalists, Zogist and anti-communist leaders and supporters into exile, including Muharrem Bajraktari, Fiqri Dine, Prenk Pervizi, Zef Pali, Abaz Kupi, Abaz Ermenji and Salih Myftija (who was then followed by his son, Dr. Fuad Myftija, who went on to become Secretary General of the Legality Party in New York).

In 1949, the Albanians formed the "Free Albania" National Committee in Paris with Midhat Frashëri as its president. Kupi participated in this committee along with other important Albanians and U.S. State Department representatives.

Kupi arrived in New York City on 14 September 1949 as a member of the National Committee for Free Europe (along with his son Petrit Kupi who served as his French translator) in support of the early CIA's abortive Operation Valuable Fiend, the agency's first paramilitary strike against the Iron Curtain.

Kupi continued his anti-communist activities until he died in New York City in January 1976.

== Honours and awards ==
- Grand Cordon of Order of Skanderbeg (1975)
- Brave of Military Order of Bravery (Urdhni i Trimnis)
- "Gjergj Kastrioti Skënderbeu" Decoration (2014)

== Sources ==
- Pearson, Owen (2006). Albania in Occupation and War: From Fascism to Communism 1940-1945. I.B. Tauris. ISBN 1-84511-104-4.
- Pearson, Owen (2007). Albania as dictatorship and democracy: from isolation to the Kosovo War, 1946-1998. I.B. Tauris. ISBN 978-1-84511-105-2.
- Amery Julian : "The sons of the Eagle", London, 1946
- Hidri Pjeter : "Gjeneral Prenk Pervizi", Toena, Tirana, 2002.
- Pervizi Lek : Im Ate Gjeneral Pervizi, Dorian, Bruxelles, 2014.
- Patrice Najbor, Histoire de l'Albanie et de sa Maison Royale (5 volumes), JePublie, Paris, 2008, (ISBN 978-2-9532382-0-4).
- Patrice Najbor, la dynastye des Zogu, Textes & Prétextes, Paris, 2002
