= Second League =

Second League may refer to:

- Second League of Estonia
- Second League of the Republika Srpska
- Second League of Armed Neutrality
- Second League of Prizren
- Second League of Montenegro
- TFF Second League of Turkey
- Ukrainian Second League
