= Prenk Pervizi =

Albanian general (1897–1977)

Prenk Pervizi Major General
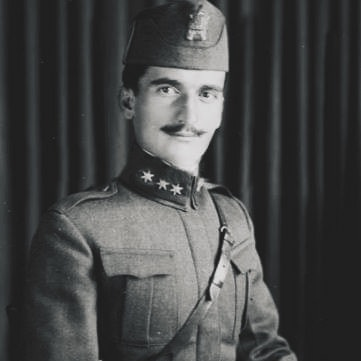
- General Prenk Pervizi
- Born: 4 May 1897; Skuraj, Vilayet of Scutari, Ottoman Empire (modern Albania)
- Died: 6 September 1977 (aged 80); Jolimont, Belgium
- Burial place: Saint Pierre La Haine
- Military career
- Allegiance: Principality of Albania; Albanian Kingdom: -1928–39 -1939–43 -1943–44
- Branch: Army
- Service years: 26
- Rank: Major General
- Unit: Infantry
- Conflicts: Albanian Revolt of 1922; June Revolution; Italo-Greek War; Albanian Civil War (1943–1944); Kosovo Operation (1944)

Prenk Pervizi (4 May 1897 – 6 September 1977) was an Albanian military figure, General of the Albanian army, who also served as Minister of Defence for a short period during World War II. Pervizi attended the Military Academy in Vienna, Austria, from 1914 to 1918, and later in Turin, 1930–1933. As a military figure, he was a protagonist in the foreground of Albanian history in the years between 1918 and 1944.As a friend and right-hand man of King Zog, he remained loyal to him and the Albanian Kingdom from beginning to end, especially during 1928–1939. During World War II he was involved in military operations. Recruited by the Italians and sent to the first line of combat, he came into conflict with them, withdrawing the Albanian troops from the Greco-Italian War. He also opposed the German SS troops recruitment process in Albania. Bitter opponent of the communists, after failed attempts to engage some serious support from the British emissaries, he was forced to exile, first in Greece and later in Belgium as a political refugee. He spent the rest of his life in Belgium, where he died at age 80, on 6 September 1977.

== Biography ==
=== Family roots ===
The Pervizi family, from the village of Skuraj in present-day Milot, Kurbin were a notable Catholic lineage from northern Albania. They took the name from their founder, Pervizi the Great of Skuraj of Kurbini, who lived in the 14th-15th century. It was said that he had strongly opposed the Ottoman invasion and had not agreed to bow to their tempting offers, for which he was killed by the Turks. It would be five centuries before the name of Pervizi returned to prominence in the history of Albania. This happened during the National Awakening, when Gjin Pjeter Mark Pervizi from Skuraj distinguished himself as Leader of the Uprising of Kurbin-Kruja (1912) against the Turkish domination, and successfully raised of the national flag in the regional center of Milot, on the same day of the Albanian Declaration of Independence, 28 November 1912, by patriots led by Ismail Qemali.

Born 4 May 1897 in Skuraj, Kurbin, Prenk Pervizi would go on to be considered a patriot, a military leader and a character of great significance and importance in the modern history of Albania.

=== Initial engagement ===
Coming out of Kadettenschule of Vienna in 1918, Pervizi was engaged in the army as commander of the Albanian district of Kruja in 1918, and later at the General Command of the Army, distinguishing himself in the operations for the expulsion of the Serbian armies from the north of the Albania, alongside patriots like Bajram Curri, Elez Isufi, and Prenk Jaku during 1920–1921. Pervizi was a friend and collaborator of Ahmet Zogu, and they had known each other since his stay in Vienna and the participation in the Congress of Lushnjë (1920) where Zogu became minister. Pervizi also defended Zogu and the government during the Albanian Revolt of 1922, when guerrillas of Elez Isufi and Zija Dibra attempted to make a Coup d'État, marched down to Tirana and threatened to get control of the capital by force (8 March 1922). The intervention of Pervizi and his gendarme units saved Albania from a crisis that could have had disastrous consequences for the very existence of it. This action earned him a promotion to Captain of First Instance for war merits, and the "Gold Medal for Military Valor".

=== Service to Zogu ===
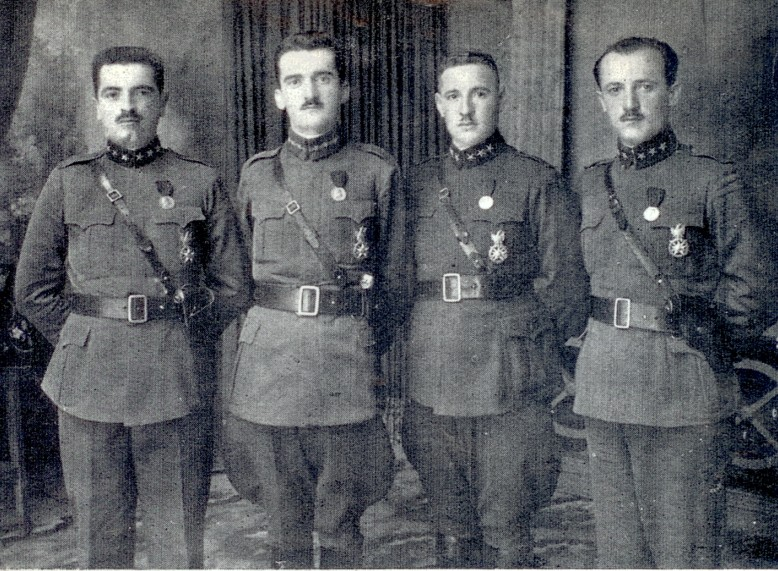
General Prenk Pervizi

Pervizi was not able to thwart a subsequent coup d'état, which began 24 June 1924. Zogu with his government and the military loyal to him fled to Yugoslavia. This is known as the June Revolution.
In December 1924 he took part in the operations that brought to power Ahmet Zogu and overthrew Fan Noli's government. Albania was divided by Zog into four military zones and Pervizi was in charge along with the other three captains (Muharrem Bajraktari to the north, Fiqri Dine for the north-west, and Hysni Dema to the south).

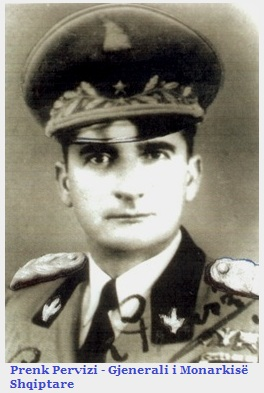
General Prenk Pervizi in Uniform

In November–December 1926, another rebellion had broken out in the Catholic regions of Dukagjin, Shala, and Shod in the north Albania, allegedly supported by Yugoslavia to destabilize the country. The rebels were initially successful in blocking the army that had intervened against them, holding the local army commanders as prisoner. The rebels were preparing to attack and occupy Shkodra. At this point, Zogu called Pervizi, giving him full powers to quell the revolt. In three days the rebellion was quelled and its leaders Ndok Gjeloshi and Dom Loro Caka fled from Albania while others were arrested and prosecuted. This success expanded Pervizi's fame and influence in the army and the population.

=== Relations with Italy ===
Pervizi remained in friendly relations with the Kingdom of Italy. In 1929, having completed his duty, Pervizi was sent to the School of War in Turin. He had sent his children for education in Italy since elementary school, in Lanzo Torinese, in the College of Don Bosco, a prestigious institution which the children of the House of Savoy, the King and Prince Umberto II of Italy also attended. They would spend three years in Turin and another two years in Florence. Pervizi was a special guest invited to the wedding of Prince Umberto, whose mother was Elena of Montenegro, and who supported the theory that Montenegrins and Albanians were of the same Illyrian origin. Pervizi received the title "Officer of the Order of Chivalry of Saint Maurice and Lazarus". Raised to the grade of colonel, he was appointed inspector in charge of the Albanian students in Italy, headquartered in Florence, where he lived until 1935. The long stay in Italy allowed him to master the Italian language and to make many acquaintances and friendships in Italian society, particularly in the military. Later in 1965, when he stopped by in Italy as a political refugee, he was asked to enroll as General in the Italian army, with the condition that he acquired Italian citizenship. He did not accept and shortly thereafter retired in Belgium.

=== The Italian invasion of Albania ===
On his return to Albania, he was in the "Commission of Foreign Observers" in the War of Ethiopia (1935–1936) where he had the opportunity to meet the General Badoglio, De Bono and Graziani, besides other senior officers including several alumni of the School of War. For this war, Pervizi wrote a very detailed report and held a number of conferences in Albania.

In August 1936, he represented Albania in a session of the Great Maneuvers of Italy in Irpinia, where he exchanged a few words with Benito Mussolini, who let him understand his intention to intervene in Albania. Pervizi went back and warned the King Zog on intentions of Benito Mussolini. Unfortunately, his warning fell on deaf ears. Zogu was skeptical and did not give credence to the warning. On the occasion of the twenty-fifth anniversary of Albanian independence (1937), Pervizi advanced to the rank of colonel and received the "Order of Besa", becoming also "Great Officer of the Order of the Crown of Italy". Strangely, he was transferred from Tirana to Korça in the far south. A measure that awake 'much wonder in a time that Albania was in danger of military attack by Italian fascism of Mussolini.'

On 1 April 1939, Francisco Franco proclaimed victory and the end of Spanish Civil War. Mussolini ordered the attack and invasion of Albania 6 days later. In this situation Pervizi asked King Zogu, while fleeing the country, to proclaim the resistance army over the mountains, but Zogu refused this proposal, himself moving to Greece and sanctioning de facto the end of the Kingdom of Albania. Pervizi was forced to defend the King and to follow him in Greece. The King begged him to talk to Albanians who had followed him and ordered him to return too. He apologized for not having promoted him to higher ranks, and tried to repair the serious mistakes of not listening to the advice of his loyal friend and respected military figure.

Once he returned to Albania, Pervizi was met by the Generals Alberto Pariani and Alfredo Guzzoni, asking him to adapt to the situation and explaining to him that they were not interested in losing the existing Albanian army. Pervizi showed himself available and requested for the Albanian army to not participate in any action against the population alongside the Italian army. His request was accepted. He was formally given the rank of Colonel, as Italians were aware of his figure and patriotic influence and sympathy that he enjoyed in the army and the population, and they were afraid to give an excuse a discontent that could deteriorate into an armed rebellion.

=== The Italo-Greek War ===
On 28 October 1940, the Italian campaign in Greece began. Some battalions of the Albanian army were staged into the divisions "Venezia" and "Julia" with Pervizi representing the Albanian army at the high command of the operations.

Pervizi came into conflict with Italian generals who were making fun of the "poor quality of Albanian soldiers", based on the fact that an Albanian units had been decimated by the Greeks. Pervizi immediately returned to the headquarters and protested in the face of two generals Visconti Prasca and Ubaldo Soddu, and all the Italian command, that Albanian soldiers were not to be used as cannon fodder. While serving in Korçë, Pervizi abandoned the war front, after he ordered the Albanian troops to leave the front as well and shelter in safe position. Korçë was left with a small company led by Spiro Moisiu, back then a lower rank officer, and was soon occupied by the Greek army. Italians, angered by this act, asked to bring those responsible before a military tribunal, but in the end, fearing further complications and worse consequences, the only proceeding was the transfer of Albanian soldiers in the mountains of the north while Pervizi got dislocated and isolated in the area of Puka. In the meantime, however, he was promoted to General, to calm the situation and the people. It loomed the unstoppable takeoff of Italy.

Pervizi was mentioned at the Conference of Mukje in August 1943, where he was proposed as commander-in-chief of the Albanian army (acting as Minister of Defence), after the surrender of Italy on 8 September 1943.

=== German occupation ===
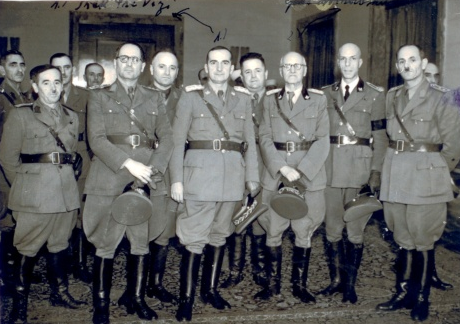
General Pervizi with his headquarters in the Albanian army.

Pervizi moved to Shkodër as a simple counselor. On 8 September 1943, he resumed his old powers, taking over command from General Dalmazzo. On 23 October, he was elected Minister of Defense and promoted to the rank of General of Division, thus enabling him to reform the Albanian army and strengthening the northern border to prevent attempts to re-annex Kosovo by Serbia. Partisans attacks led him to abandon Tirana in favor of the mountains, where he joined the British mission in Albania (August 1944) in the region of Kurbin (Skuraj), in an attempt to organize the struggle against the Communists.

=== Exile ===
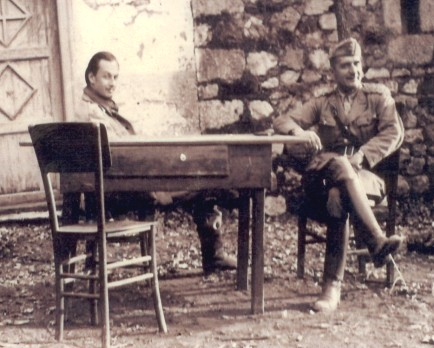
Julian Amery and General Pervizi in Albania, October 1944

Pervizi made the acquaintance of Colonel Neil McLean, and other officers as Julian Amery and David Smiley. He proposed to the British to form a commanding unit with them, and organized militarily forces to oppose the Communists who were about to take power without meeting any significant resistance. The British did not accept and left in October 1944. Pervizi was an anti-communist. He took refuge in the mountains of Skuraj during 1944–1946 and in September 1946 secretly reached Greece, where he acquired the status of a political refugee. After 19 years in Greece, he passed in Italy in 1965, then in 1966 in Belgium, where he lived 11 years and died on 6 September 1977, at the age of 80, after 31 years of political exile. During all this time his family, mother, wife and three children were locked up in prisons and concentration camps of Communist Albania. His mother, wife, and second son, died while in internment in these camps.

== Battles and wars ==
- Against Serbian armies in North Albania, 1919–20
- Uprising of Mirdita 1921
- Albanian Revolt of 1922
- June Revolution 1924
- (Drenica-Dukagjin Uprisings) Uprising of Dukagjin 1926
- Italo-Greek War (Greco-Italian War) 1940-41
- Defense of Kosova,(Kosovo Operation (1944) 1943–44

== Distinctions and decorations ==
- Promoted for merits of war. -
- Medal of Military Valor. -
- Grand Officer of the Order of Scanderbeg. -
- Medal "Triumph of Legality". -
- Knight of the Order SS. Maurice and Lazarus. -
- Grand Officer of the Order of the Crown of Italy
- Medal of Albanian Order of "Besa". -
- Honor's Badge of the War College in Turin. -
- Honor's Badge of War in Abyssinia. -
- Honor's Badge of Great Maneuvers in Italy. -

== Bibliography ==
- Pjetër Hidri (2002). Gjeneral Prenk Pervizi : monografi. Tirana: Botimet Toena. ISBN 9789992716205. OCLC 68622616.
- Gjovalin Kola (2006), Pourquoi la Belgique dans l'histoire albanaise?, Bruxelles: Éd. Grafimmo, pp. 66–76, OCLC 260134350
- Julian Amery (1948). Sons of the eagle, a study in guerilla war. London: Macmillan. pp. 304–306. OCLC 10258345.
- Proletar Hasani (2001). Kush e ka drejtuar ushtrinë shqiptar: drejtuesit kryesorë të saj nga krijimi deri më sot, Tirana. OCLC 69017482.
- Reginald Hibert (1991). The Bitter Victory, New York: Pinter Pub Ltd. ISBN 978-0861871094.
- Lek Pervizi (2011). Gjenerali Prenk Pervizi ne shtypin shqiptar, Bruxelles: Dorian, ISBN 978-1105271861.
- David Smiley (1985). Albanian Assignment, London and Sydney: Sphere. ISBN 978-0722179338.
- Patrice Najbor (2008). Histoire de l'Albanie et de sa Maison Royale, Tome II, 1925–1939. Paris: JePublie. ISBN 978-2953238204.
- Walther Peinsipp (1985)."Das Volk der Shkypetaren. Geschichte, Gesellschafts- und Verhaltensordnung". Wien, Köln, Graz: Hermann Böhlaus Nachfahren.
- P. Sebastiano Monari,L'italia nella seconda guerra mondiale- Guerra di Grecia, 2004.
- Robert Elsie, The Tribes of Albania, London 2015.
- Robert Elsie, A Biographical Dictionary of the Albanian History, London, 2013.
- Piero Crociani, Gli Albanesi nelle forze armate italiane, Roma, 2004.
- Mario Cervi, La guerra di Grecia, 2001.
- Wiki, General, Alfredo Stroessner, etc.. 2014.
- Hubert Neuwith, Wiederstand und collaboration in Albanien,1939-1944.
- Micael Schmidt-Neke, Enstellung und Aufbau der Königsdictatur in Albanien.
