= Kosovo Regiment =

- Regimenti Kosova
- Active: November 1943
- Country: Nazi Germany
- Allegiance: Second League of Prizren
- Size: 1,000 - 1,500

Commanders
- Notable commanders: Bajazit Boletini; Xhafer Deva

The Kosovo Regiment (Albanian: Regimenti Kosova, Serbian: Косовски пук) was an Axis military unit created after Italian capitulation in November 1943 in Kosovska Mitrovica, Territory of the Military Commander in Serbia (modern day Kosovo) by Nazi Germany, consisting of local Albanians.

== Background ==
Following the capitulation of Italy from the war, Xhafer Deva helped form a provisional government under German occupation and set up the Second League of Prizren alongside other Albanian nationalists. The Kosovo Regiment was established as military formation of the Second League of Prizren. The regiment was established by the Central Committee of the Second League of Prizren. The Germans entrusted the establishment of the Kosovo Regiment to Bajazit Boletini. The commander of the regiment was Bajazit Boletini, while commanders of regiment's battalions were Rasim Dajči, Jusuf Boletini (Bajazit's brother) and Rizo Agaj.

The number of Albanians who joined this regiment was around 1,000 or 1,500.

== Activities ==
On 3 December 1943 the regiment murdered 30 Serbs in village Rakoš, on 4 December the regiment killed 34 Serbs in Đakovica and another 36 Serbs in village Siga.

This regiment was used against Partisans in neighboring regions.

Between 4 and 7 December 1943, 400 soldiers of Kosovo Regiment commanded by Xhafer Deva surrounded Peć and committed mass murder of local Serbs and Montenegrins, killing at least 300 people.

== Sources ==
- Elsie, Robert (1997). Kosovo: in the heart of the powder keg. East European Monographs. ISBN 978-0-88033-375-7.
- The South Slav Journal. Dositey Obradovich Circle. 2008.
- Filipović, Gordana (1989). Kosovo--past and present. Review of International Affairs.
- Marović, Miodrag (1 January 1995). Balkanski Džoker: Albanija i Albanci : istorijska hronika nastajanja i razvoja albanskog pitanja. Kulturni centar. ISBN 9788670040052.
- Review (2004). Review. The Institute.
- Ličina, Đorđe; Vavić, Milorad; Pavlovski, Jovan (1985). Andrija Artuković, Vjekoslav Luburić, Xhafer Deva, Vančo Mihailov. Centar za informacije i publicitet.
- Lekić, Đorđe (1995). Kosovo i metohija tokom vekova: zublja. NILP "Panorama".
- Dželetović, Pavle Ivanov (2000). Balistički pokret: 1939-1952 : masovnost, saradnja sa italijanskim i nemačkim okupatorima i zločini nad Srbima. Arhiv Srbije.
