= Third League of Prizren =

The Third League of Prizren or the Third Prizren League or the "League of Prizren" in Exile was an organisation founded by a group of nationalist Albanians in United States in 1946 and renewed by the initiative of the CIA in 1962 in order to organize and coordinate activities aimed to creation of the Greater Albania. One of its members was Hisen Tërpeza.

After Yugoslavia was confronted with Comintern in 1948, Albania was directly involved in combined propagandist and diversion fight against Yugoslavia. Armaments which were transported from Albania to Kosovo presented significant danger and was forcibly collected in period 1954–1957. One of the presidents of the league was Tahir Zaimi.

In 1966 Xhafer Deva merged Kosovaret and Third League of Prizren and became its leader. He remained its president until his death in 1978. Sigurimi infiltrated its men into the Third League of Prizren because they shared the same objectives in case of Yugoslavia. The official magazine of the organization was published under the name "Lidhja e Prizrenit" (English: The League of Prizren). Robert Elsie stated that organization of 1960's was a re-creation of the new Second League of Prizren. Yugoslav authorities imprisoned and trialed some members of the league and sentenced them to prison. One of declassified documents of CIA confirm that one of the imprisoned and trialed members of the league was agent of CIA. The Third League of Prizren and the Free Kosovo National Committee agreed on a joint struggle in 1978.

== See also ==
- League of Prizren
- Second League of Prizren
- Balli Kombëtar
