= Legality Movement =

Albanian royalist political faction (1941-1945)

- Lëvizja Legaliteti
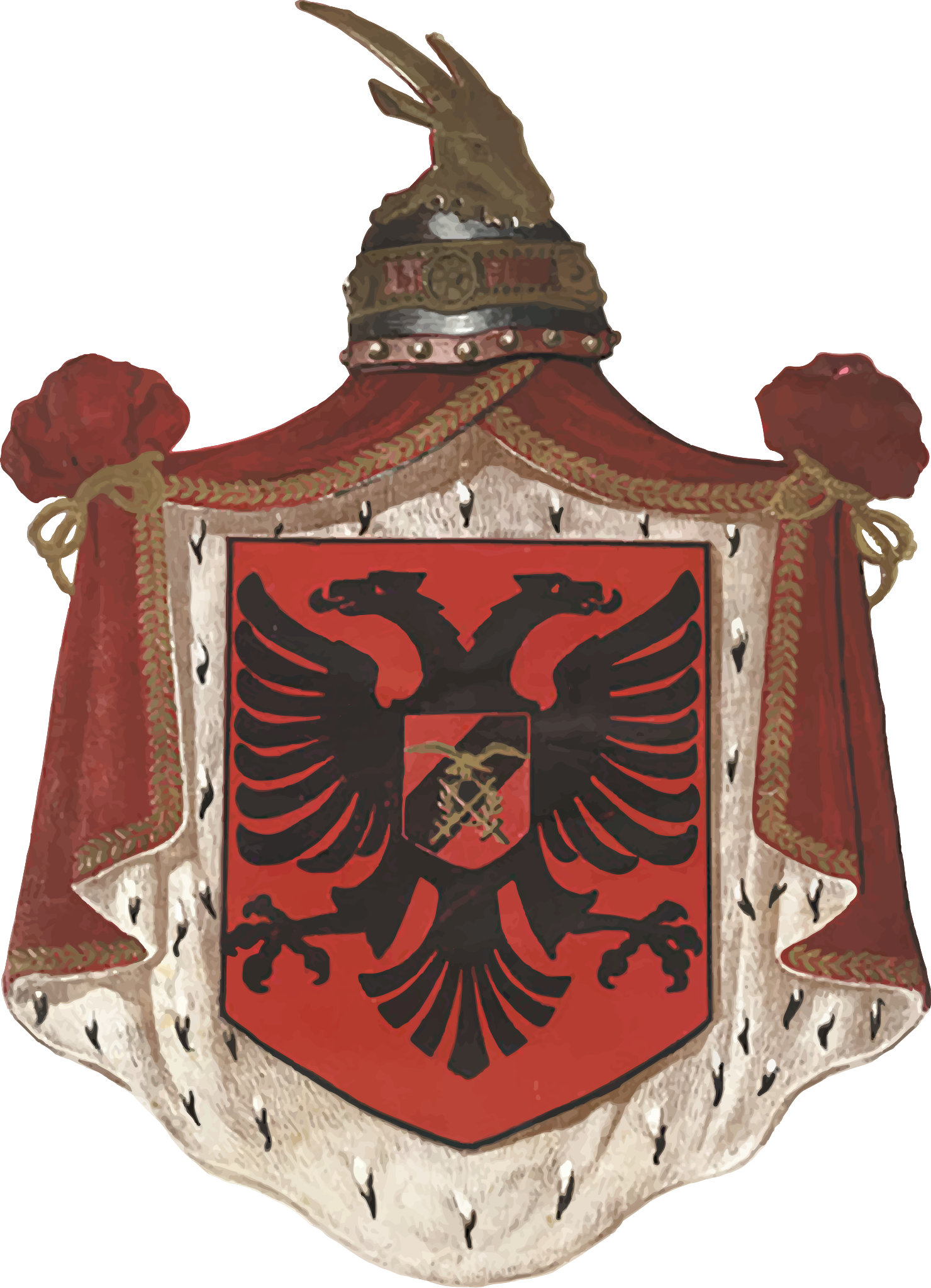
- Coat of arms of the Albanian Kingdom
- Leaders: Abaz Kupi; Ndoc Çoba
- Dates active: 1943–1945
- Allegiance: King Zog I
- Headquarters: Mat
- Active regions: Albania
- Ideology: Monarchism; Albanian nationalism
- Size: 10,000 (1943)
- Wars: World War II in Albania

The Legality Movement (Albanian: Lëvizja Legaliteti) was an Albanian royalist and pro-monarchy faction founded in 1941. It was led by Abaz Kupi.

== Ideology ==
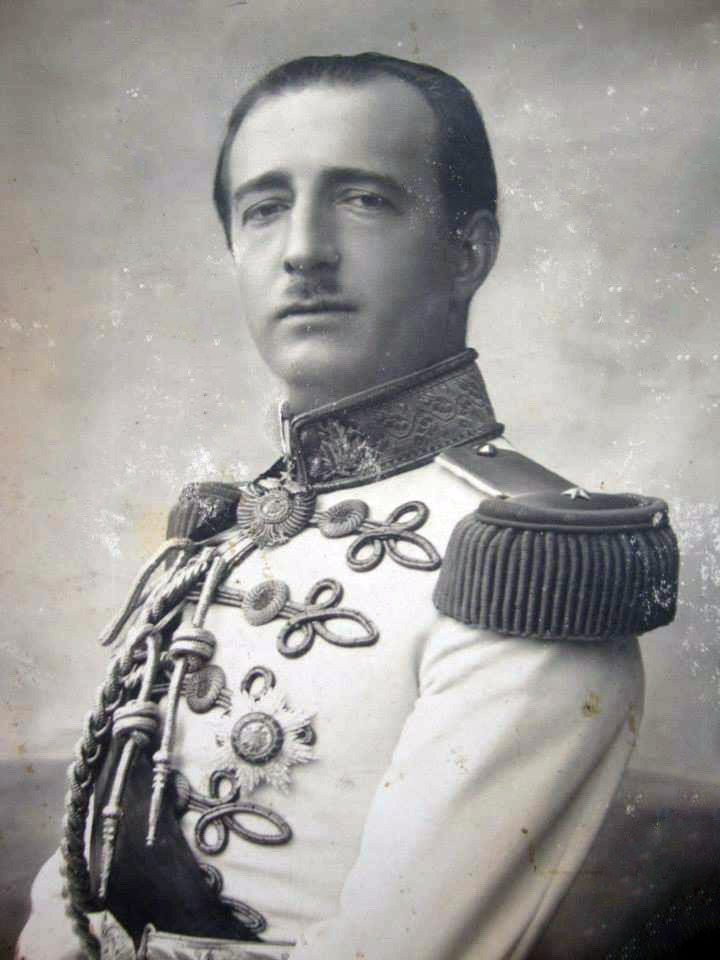
Zog I of Albania

The Legaliteti sought the return of King Zog, who had fled the country on the eve of the Italian invasion. The Legaliteti consisted of supporters from mostly the northern mountain tribes, particularly the Mati region. The Legaliteti were anti-communist. In the end of Albanian Resistance war they formed a government with Balli Kombëtar against the Germans and LANÇ.

== History ==
The negative action of the Albanian Communists on the Kosovo issue alienated a significant number of its adherents from that border region. Following November 1943, Abaz Kupi, until the Mukje Conference, was a member of the Central Council of the NLM, withdrew with others to form the Legaliteti. Kupi was a respected Gheg chieftain who had commanded King Zog's troops in Durrës when the Italians invaded Albania. In the early 1940s, three new political factions emerged within Albania after the Italians were defeated: the Albanian Communists, Balli Kombëtar (National Front), and Legaliteti (Legality).

After the outbreak of the Albanian Civil War, the communists reached Tirana in 1944. The communist 5th Brigade fought against the Legaliteti's headquarters at Tujan Pass. Abaz Kupi withdrew to avoid further civil war, informing King Zog of the bloodshed. In Mat, partisans clashed with Legaliteti forces, including a battle in Fushë-Aliaj on 9 July where 21 partisans were killed. This was one of their few engagements.

The Allies originally supported the Legaliteti. Being the smallest faction with no significant influence in Albania, the Allies broke aid with the Legaliteti and aided the Yugoslav Partisans, who in turn backed the Albanian communists. In 1945, the Albanian communists assumed control over Albania at the end of World War II in Europe. Most Legaliteti members were executed or had escaped to the west.

== Legacy ==
The monarchist Legality Movement Party takes its name from the group.
