= Rexhep Mitrovica =

Kosovar Albanian politician (1888–1967)

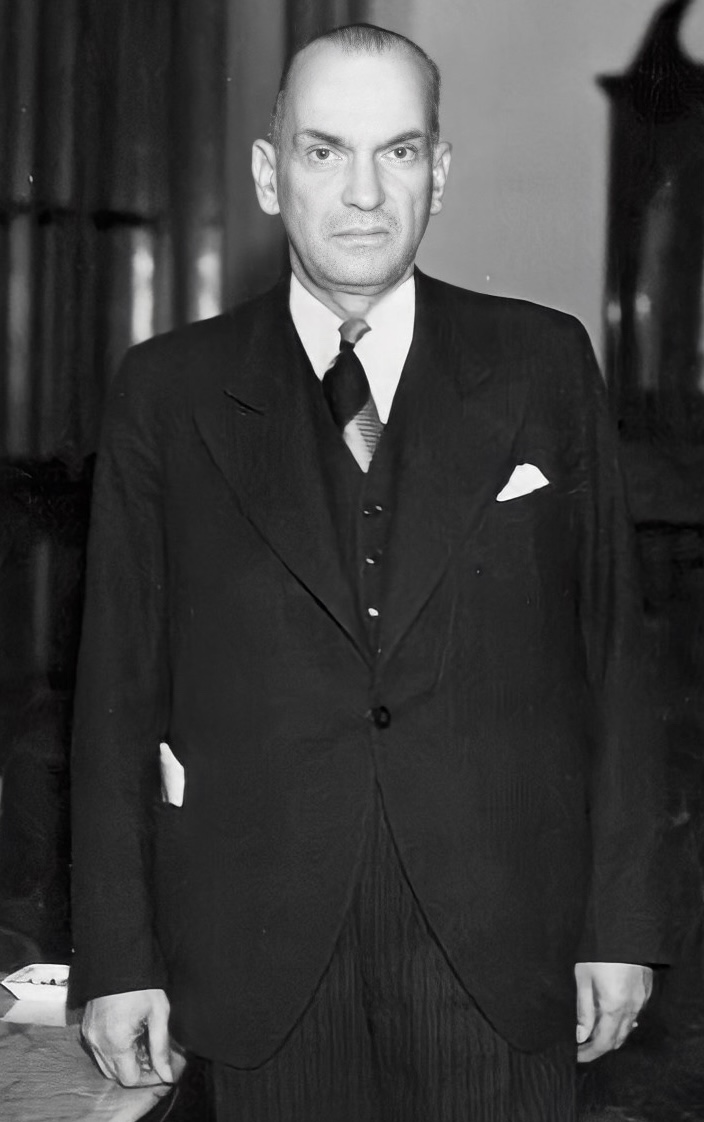

19th Prime Minister of Albania
- In office 4 November 1943 – 18 July 1944
- Preceded by: Ekrem Libohova
- Succeeded by: Fiqri Dine

9th Minister of Education
- In office 24 December 1921 – 25 February 1924
- Preceded by: Aleksandër Xhuvani
- Succeeded by: Fahri Rashiti

Personal details
- Born: 15 January 1888 Mitrovica, Kosovo Vilayet, Ottoman Empire (modern-day Kosovo)
- Died: 21 May 1967 (aged 79) Istanbul, Turkey
- Party: Balli Kombëtar
- Children: 3
- Occupation: Teacher
- Awards: Order of Freedom (Kosovo)

Rexhep Mitrovica (15 January 1888 – 21 May 1967) was a Prime Minister of Albania's government under Nazi Germany.

== Biography ==
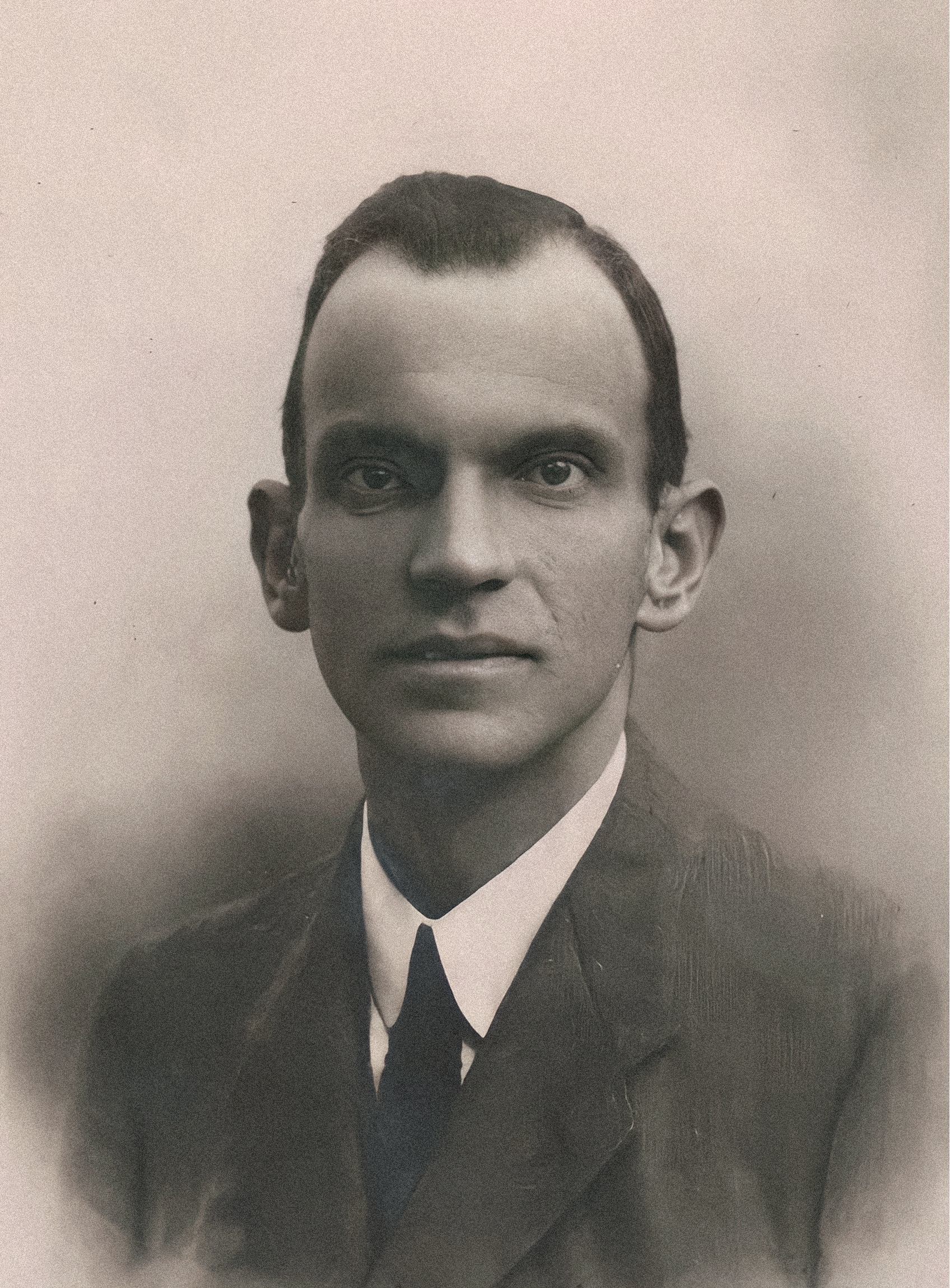
Rexhep Mitrovica in the 1920s

=== Prime minister ===
After German occupation of Albania, on 6 November 1943, Berlin announced that the regents and the assembly had formed a government headed by Rexhep Mitrovica, an active member of the Balli Kombëtar from Kosovo.

With control over Kosovo and the creation of a puppet Independent State of Albania, Mitrovica exacted terror on the Serbian population, killing and expelling thousands.

On 18 July 1944 Rexhep Mitrovica resigned due to illness.

=== Exile and death ===
His grandson, Redjep Mitrovitsa is an actor of Comédie-Française.

== Sources ==
- Owen Pearson, Albania and King Zog: Independence, republic and monarchy 1908-1939, London, Tauris, 2004, ISBN 1-84511-013-7.
- Owen Pearson, Albania in occupation and war: From fascism to communism, 1940-1945, London, Tauris, 2005, ISBN 1-84511-014-5.

== See also ==
- History of Albania
- List of prime ministers of Albania

Political offices
Preceded by Eqrem Libohova	Prime Minister of Albania (under Nazi Germany); 4 November 1943 – 16 June 1944	Succeeded by Fiqri Dine
