= Fiqri Dine =

Prime Minister of Albania during World War II (1897–1960)

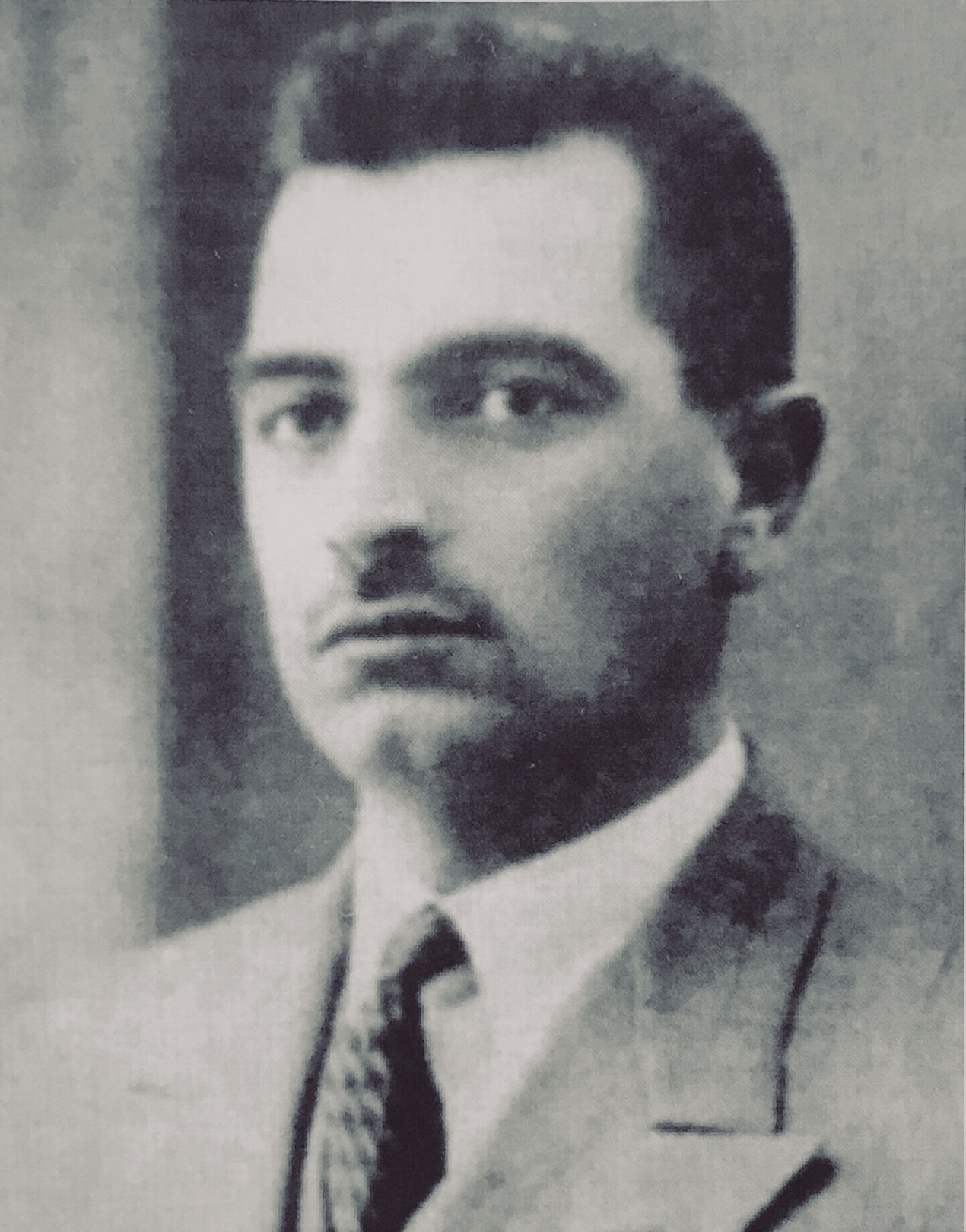

20th Prime Minister of Albania
- In office 18 July 1944 – 29 August 1944
- Preceded by: Rexhep Mitrovica
- Succeeded by: Ibrahim Biçakçiu

Personal details
- Born: 5 May 1897 Maqellarë, Debre, Manastir Vilayet, Ottoman Empire (modern-day Albania)
- Died: 26 November 1960 (aged 63) Brussels, Belgium
- Party: Legaliteti
- Parent: Dine Maqellara (Father)
- Profession: Prime Minister

Colonel Fiqri Dine (5 May 1897 or 3 August 1897 – 26 November 1960) was Prime Minister of Albania under Nazi Germany's military occupation. He was the chieftain of the Dine clan from Debar.

== Biography ==
Fiqiri Dine was born on 5 May 1897 in Dibra, Ottoman Empire (now Albania), the only son of Dine Maqellara, an Albanian patriot, fighter and activist during the Albanian revolt of 1910. He finished elementary school at Debar "Shehër". Afterwards, he went to a military academy in Wels, Austria-Hungary from 1914 until 1919 when he graduated and returned to Albania as a lieutenant in Shkodër.

=== Prime minister ===
Despite being chosen as the Prime minister of Albania, Dine was mainly influenced by Mehdi Frashëri and Abaz Kupi. Frashëri, using Dine's connection to the Legaliteti, requested that Kupi join the government. Kupi agreed after the Albanian partisans began attacking Kupi's territory. However, the Germans refused to accept Dine and Mehdi Frashëri's proposed cabinet or Frashëri's choice to succeed Fuat Dibra, who died in February, as Regent. Dine and Frasheri proposed that a Gheg coalition should be formed. The plan was to coordinate Ballist and Zogist strength and, in cooperation with the Germans, drive back the Communists. At the same time, they hoped to convince the Allies that they were acting on behalf of an independent Albania and therefore deserved, if not direct Allied support, at least a respite from active Allied resistance. Initial military operations against the partisans were seemingly quite successful. Germans and Zogist forces, without directly cooperating, managed to drive the partisans from Mati at the end of July. Mehmet Shehu forces that controlled Debar, forced the partisans to retreat for the time being. However, the Allied forces began dropping supplies to partisan territory and helping them rebuild a new offensive. The Ballist-Zogist gamble had failed. A series of ominous international events during the last days of August made it abundantly clear to even the most pro-German Albanians that the German occupation of Albania would soon end. The German elite within Albania grew wary of Dine and Frasheri. Martin Schliep and Josef Fitzthum where enraged after discovering Dine's contact with the Allies, replaced him with Ibrahim Biçakçiu on 29 August 1944. Dine was Prime minister for only 43 days.

=== After World War II ===
After the war Dine, together with Muharrem Bajraktari, worked for the Albanian Committee in Paris. Dine fled from Yugoslavia to Brussels, Belgium, where he died on 26 November 1960, aged 63.

Political offices
| Preceded by Rexhep Mitrovica | Prime Minister of Albania (under Nazi Germany); 18 July 1944–29 August 1944 | Succeeded by Ibrahim Biçakçiu |
