= Kryeziu =

Kryeziu is an Albanian surname. Notable people include:

- Albulena Kryeziu (born 1986), Albanian actress
- Almir Kryeziu (born 1998), Kosovan footballer
- Altin Kryeziu (born 2002), Slovenian-Kosovan footballer
- Ceno Kryeziu (1895–1927), albanian political figure
- Clirim Kryeziu (born 1989), Swiss footballer
- Egzon Kryeziu (born 2000), Slovenian footballer
- Gani Bey Kryeziu, Kosovo Albanian anti-communist resistance fighter
- Hekuran Kryeziu (born 1993), Kosovan footballer
- Ismet Bey Kryeziu, Albanian political figure
- Kiana Kryeziu (born 2004), Kosovan alpine skier
- Kryeziu Brothers (Ceno Bey, Gani Bey, Said Bey, Ali, Rada, and Hasan Bey), members of an influential Kosovo Albanian family in the 20th century
- Leotrim Kryeziu (born 1999), Kosovan footballer
- Mirlind Kryeziu (born 1997), footballer
- Naim Kryeziu (1918–2010), Kosovar football player
- Riza Bey Gjakova (1847–1917), Albanian nationalist and guerrilla fighter
- Said Bey Kryeziu (1911–1993), Kosovo Albanian anti-communist resistance fighter
- Vijona Kryeziu (born 1997), Kosovan footballer

== See also ==
- Kryezezi, a tribe in the Mat District
- Kryezi, Tirana
- Kryezi, Kavajë
- Kriezis, Greek surname of Arvanite origin
