= Taksim meeting =

1912 plot in Albania

The Taksim meeting (Albanian: Mbledhja e Taksimit) alternatively known as the Taksim Plot (Komploti i Taksimit) and less commonly as the Taksim Assembly (Kuvendi i Taksimit) was a secret meeting held in January 1912 by Albanian nationalist deputies of the Ottoman parliament and other prominent Albanian political figures. The event gets its name from Taksim Square because of the location of the house where it was held. The meeting was organized on the initiative of Hasan Prishtina and Ismail Qemali, Albanian politicians, who invited most of the MPs of Albanian origin and aimed at launching an armed general uprising in Albanian territories against the central government headed by the Committee of Union and Progress (CUP). The meeting followed two other Albanian uprisings of 1910 in the Vilayet of Kosovo and 1911 in the mountains of upper Shkodra. The Taksim meeting resulted in an uprising the same year, with armed uprisings in Shkodër, Lezhë, Mirditë, Krujë and other Albanian provinces, which exceeded the organizers' expectations. The biggest uprising was in Kosovo, where the rebels were more organized and managed to take over important cities like Prizren, Peja, Gjakova, Mitrovica and others.

== Background ==
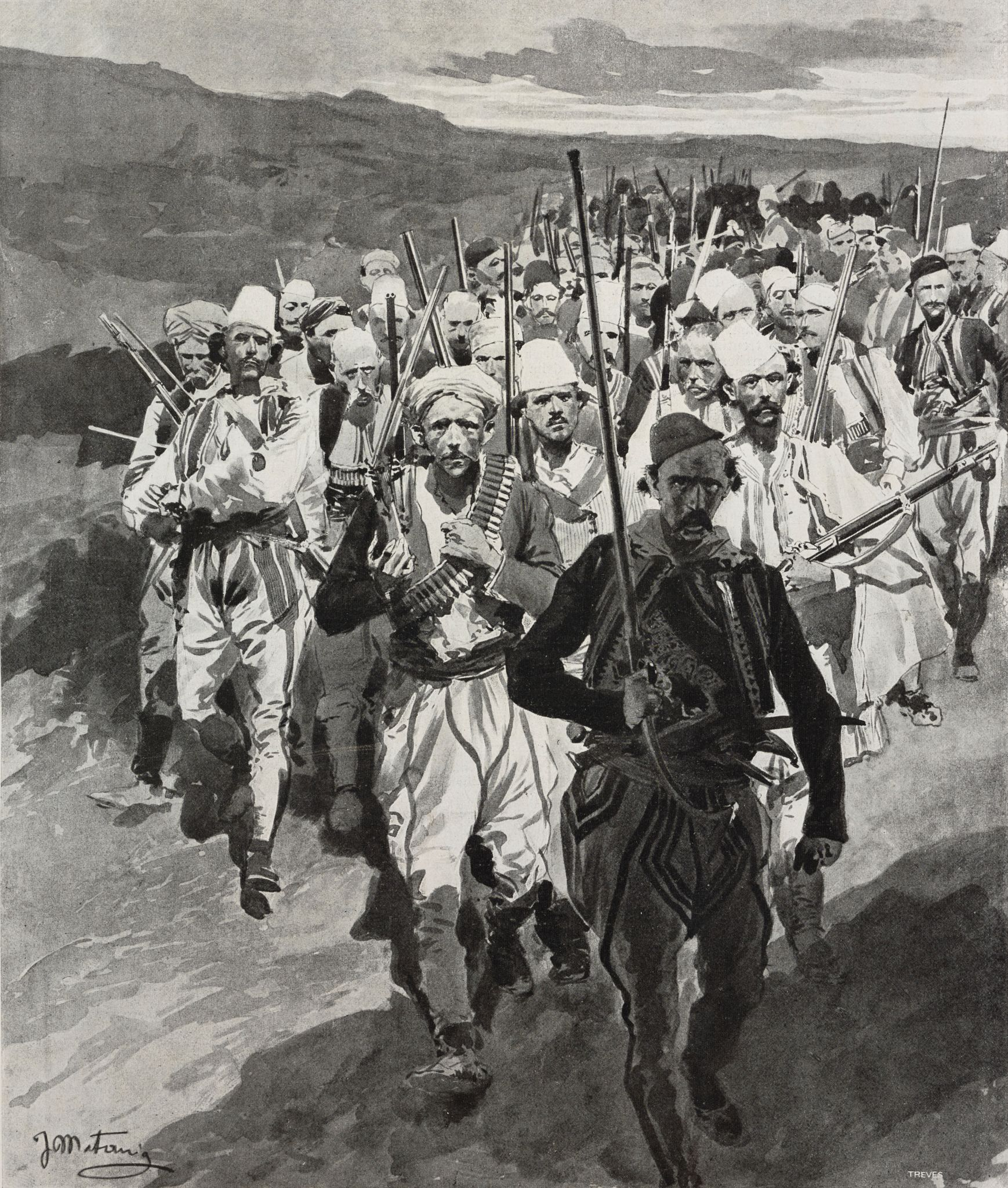
Group of Albanian insurgents, published in L'Illustrazione Italiana in 1902

After the Young Turk revolution of June 1908 and the restoration of the 1876 constitution by Sultan Abdülhamid II, from the parliamentary elections of the same year, between 26 and 28 Albanian deputies were elected to represent the Albanian provinces in the empire. Since 1902, two principal trends among the Young Turks began to take shape, one favoring Turkish nationalism and the other Ottoman liberalism. Supporters of the first current would form the Committee of Union and Progress (CUP) which would govern the empire for the most part during the post-revolutionary years. While the second current, later known as the Liberty Party, would serve as the main opposition group against CUP during 1908–1910. The latter, unlike the CUP which was more organized as a political force, did not constitute a unified force but rather consisted of deputies who opposed the ruling party and its policies in their constituencies. Albanian politicians were divided into both camps with prominent figures in the highest ranks of both CUP and Liberals. There were also political figures who remained independent and give their support to one or the other depending on the situation or personal benefits.

The restoration of the constitution was generally well-received among Albanians, as they had played an active role in the revolution, but also driven by the promises the revolutionaries had offered, such as freedom and rights long denied by what was perceived as the despotic Hamidian regime. In the Albanian provinces the implementation of the freedoms and rights guaranteed by the constitution began by opening Albanian schools, creating so-called patriotic clubs, and opening newspapers and journals throughout the empire in order to raise national awareness. Soon these developments would contradict the very policies of the ruling party, as the CUP began to see them as a threat to Ottomanism and their intention to centralize power in Constantinople. The clashes began early, with the Albanians attempting to adopt a Latin alphabet for the Albanian language culminating in the Congress of Manastir in 1909, almost a year after the revolution. While the CUP pushed for the adoption of a Turkish-Arabic script, Albanian intellectuals rejected this as incompatible with the phonetics of the Albanian language. The situation would worsen a year later in the Albanian revolt of 1910 where the Ottoman forces initially under the command of Cavid Pasha and then Shevket Turgut Pasha under the pretext of suppressing the "reactionaries" and the "çetas" would commit atrocities in the Vilayet of Kosovo and the Vilayet of Shkodra. The Albanians secured some victories but after Mahmud Shevket Pasha, the Minister of War, took over command and was reinforced with an additional 35–40,000 soldiers the revolt was suppressed without much difficulty.

A year later another revolt took place in March 1911 in Malësia, organized by the mostly Catholic fis of Malësors (lit. 'highlanders'). Similar uprisings, but more limited in number and size, took place in Mirdita, highlands of Tirana, Elbasan, and in the south. The situation was quite the same in Toskëria, where during the last year the activity of guerrilla çetas had significantly increased in almost every area of Janina vilayet. The çetas consisted of both Christian and Muslim Albanians, and according to Ottoman intelligence, they demanded the autonomy of the Albanian provinces, complementing the unrest in Gegëria. Although uncoordinated and seemingly unrelated to each other, these uprisings had a great effect on the politics in Constantinople, creating dissatisfaction between the Albanian deputies and the government. Both events contributed to the breaking of relations between the Albanians members of the CUP and the party itself, including founding members like Ibrahim Temo, and other prominent figures like Nexhip Bey Draga, Bedri Bey Pejani, Hasan Bey Prishtina, and Essad Pasha Toptani.

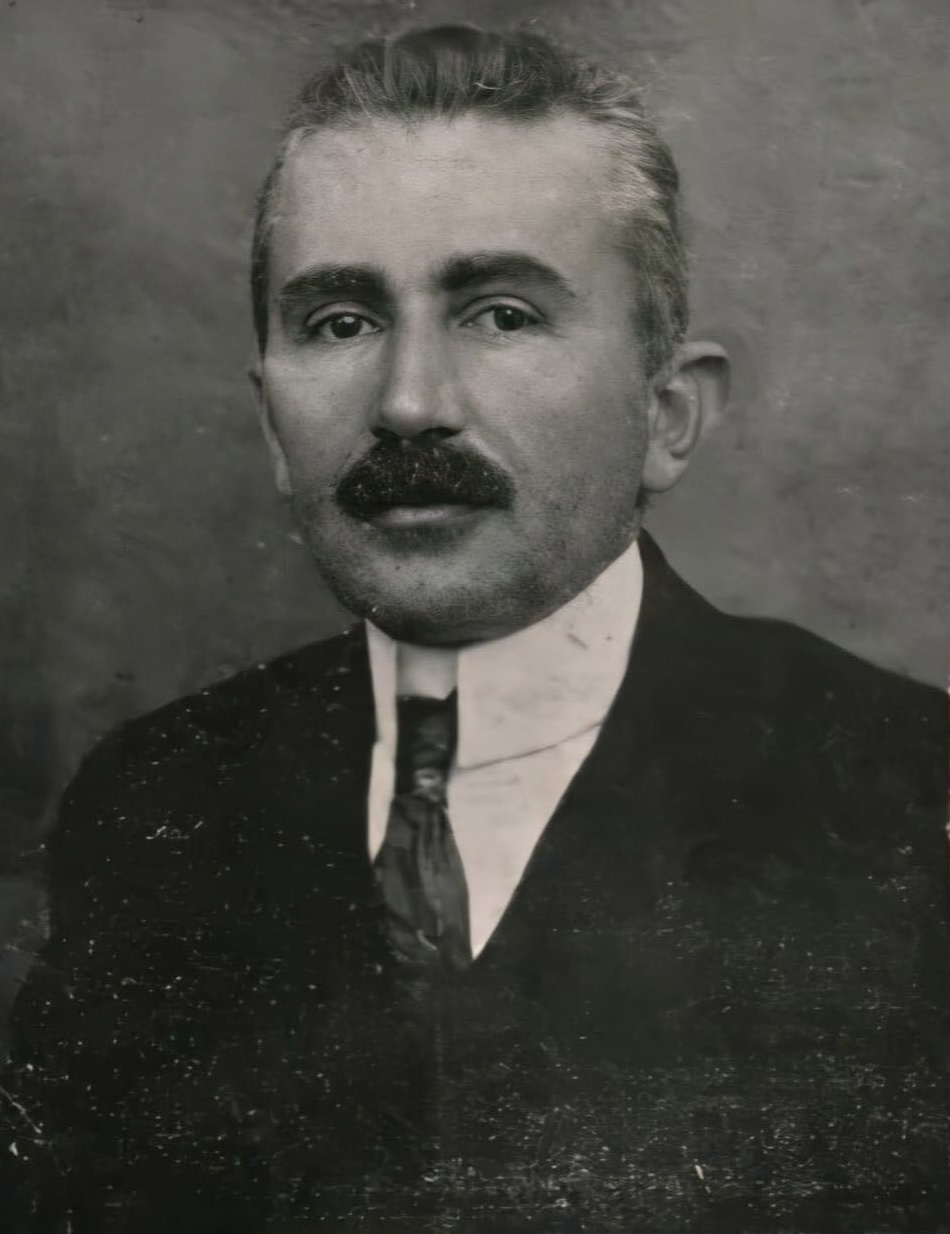
Hasan Prishtina

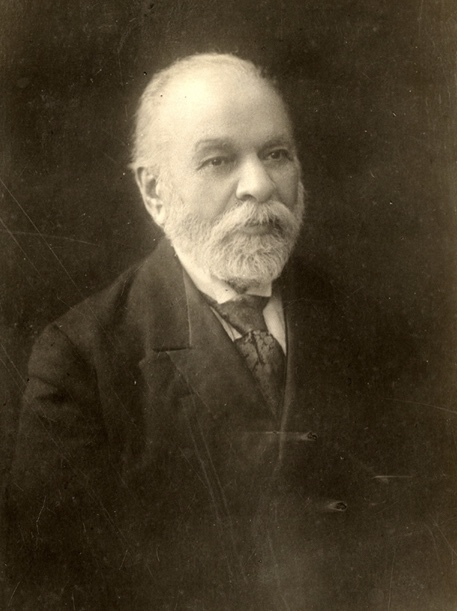
Ismail Qemali

Furthermore, due to the failure of the CUP to implement reforms and end the repressive measures against Albanians, from the middle of 1911 to the end of the year the debates in parliament had taken on a threatening tone between the Albanian MPs and the government. The departure of Albanian deputies from the CUP continued, as 7 out of 10 deputies had joined the ranks of the opposition or the independents. While the opposition, which since November 21 of that year had coalesced under the umbrella of the Freedom and Accord Party (Turkish: Hürriyet ve İtilâf Fırkası), better known as Liberal Entente, tended to support the Albanian question. Albanian political figures, despite the divisions of the past, had now begun to become aware of the common threat and started to unify their positions in parliament, becoming perhaps the Unionists' most bitter opponents. By the end of December, the political situation in Constantinople continued to boil and the CUP had begun to seriously consider dissolving the Chamber of Deputies with the ultimate aim of removing dissident deputies from parliament. On 11 January 1912, the nationalist deputy of Liberal Entente, Hasan Bey declared in parliament: "If the Government does not change its policies and administration in Albania, if the Albanians do not receive the political rights that are incumbent upon them, it is inevitable that there will be an explosion, and grave and bloody incidents will be the consequence." adding "I mean that if the 'Young Turks' continue pursuing these cruel domestic policies, I myself will be among the first to raise the banner of rebellion". After the session closed, Ismail Bey Qemali, also a member of the Liberal Entente, approached and congratulated Hasan Bey for the stance held and together they decided to meet at Hasan Prishtina's house to discuss the steps that could be taken to put into practice measures which would force the CUP to accept the demands of the Albanians.

== Meeting and participants ==
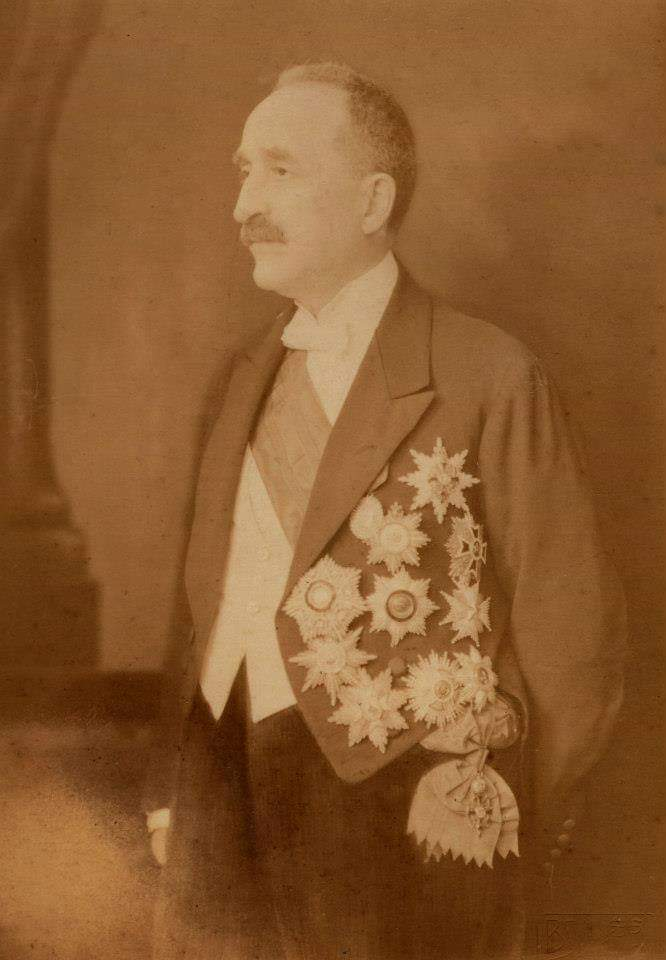
Syrja Vlora

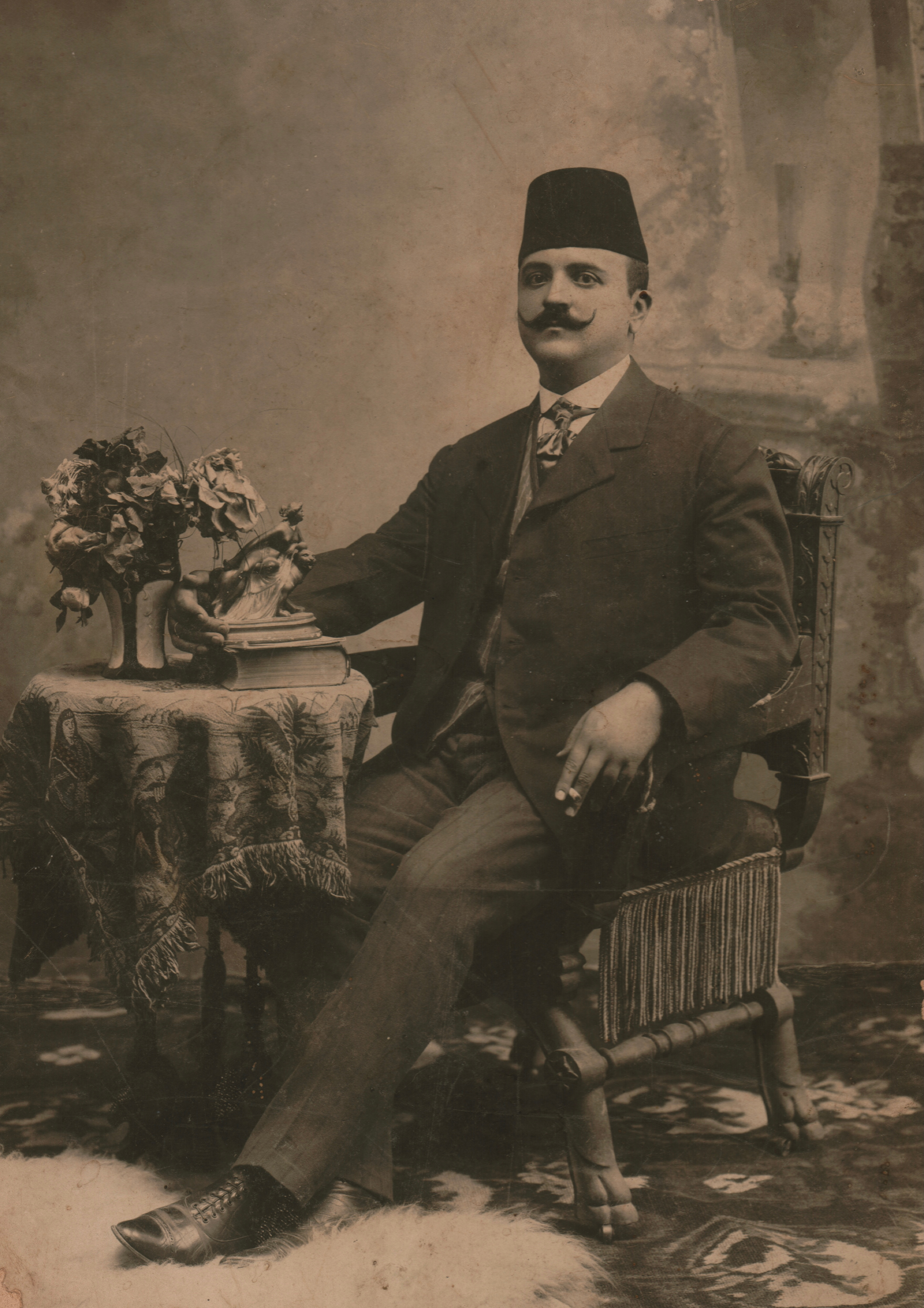
Mufid Libohova

After discussions between Qemali and Prishtina, both concluded that a general revolt was the only solution and that Albania's autonomy should be the ultimate goal, as only then could the long-demanded freedoms and rights be guaranteed. To achieve the goal, they agreed upon meeting at the Pera Palace Hotel, in the Beyoğlu district of Constantinople, where Qemali lived for some time and talked in more detail. The next day the two agreed that in order to achieve the goal they had to seek the support of other Albanian deputies who had the same convictions as them and who could be trusted. It was agreed that the meeting would be held in the form of a Kuvend (lit. 'Assembly') and to make sure that the meeting was as secret as possible and hidden from the authorities. As such, it was decided to hold it at the nearby home of Syrja Bey Vlora, the brother of the former Grand Vizier Mehmed Ferid Pasha and who was also Qemali's first cousin. The event would later be known in Albanian historiography as the "Taksim Plot" because of the location where it was held near Taksim Square. Syrja Bey, a well-known Austrophile, did not hesitate to express differing views from Qemali, so much that opposing factions developed. Although not an MP, Syrja Bey supported the full independence of Albania and did not hesitate to express this view publicly, either in newspaper articles of the empire or through interviews published in the Austrian press. This view was contrary to what the others had opted of obtaining or at least hoped to do so, namely an autonomy under the Ottoman Empire itself, as the fear of opening up many fronts in the Balkans in their view could have costed Albanians territories which couldn't be defended against multiple hostile armies with the support of a Great Power.

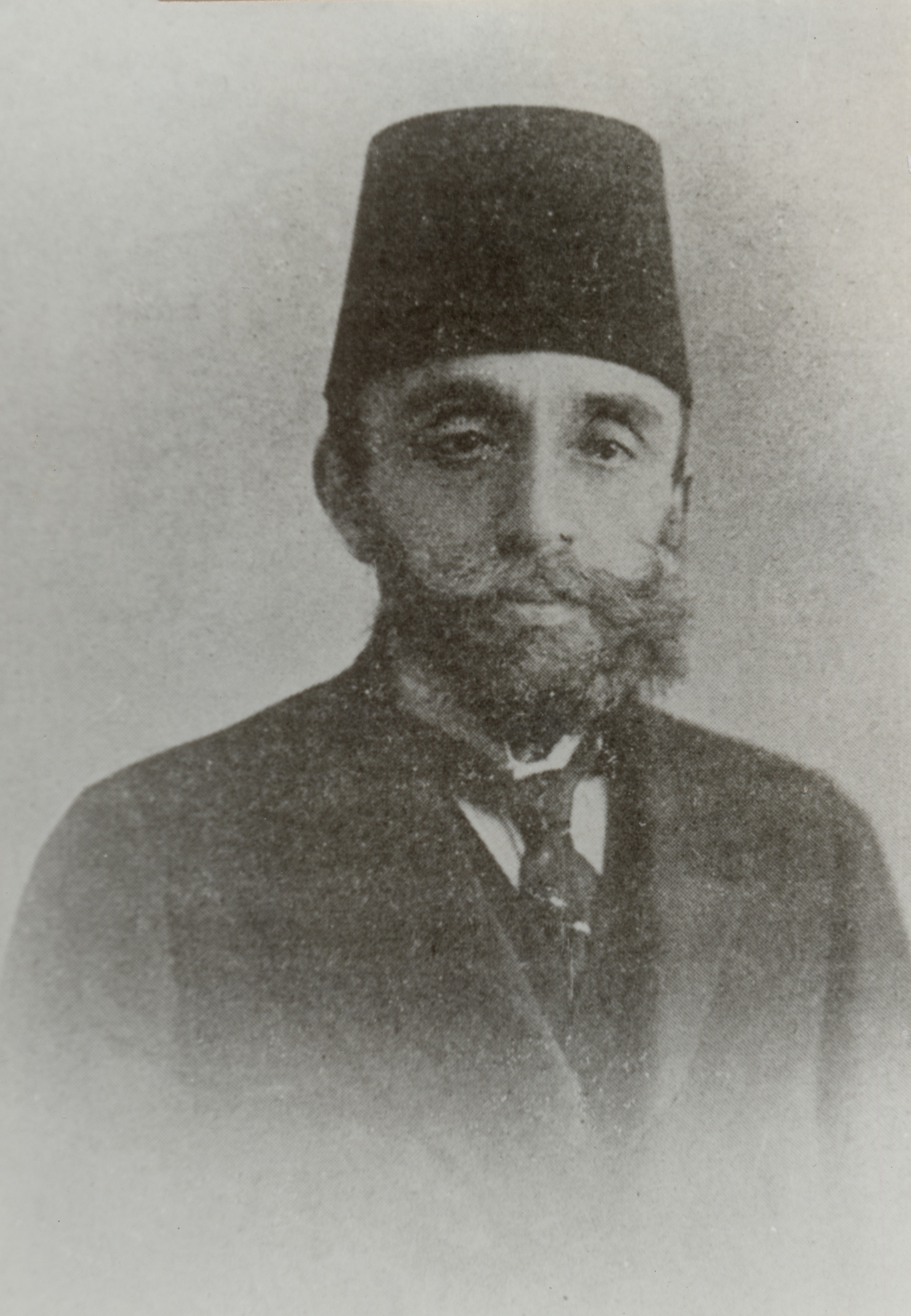
Aziz Vrioni

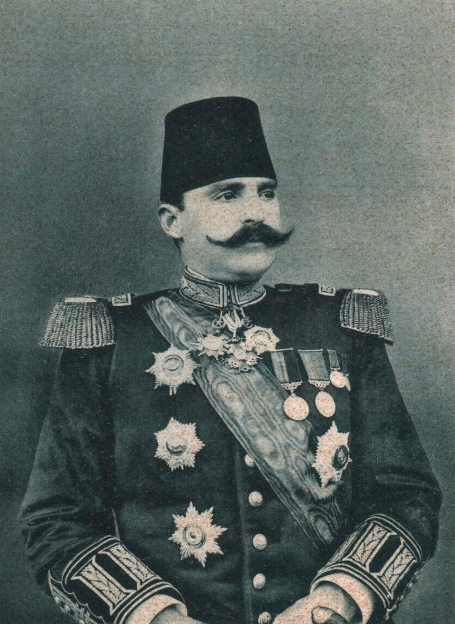
Essad Pasha Toptani

In addition to the two organizers and the host of the meeting, it was decided to invite Essad Pasha Toptani, the deputy of the Sanjak of Durrës, Mufid bej Libohova of Delvina and Aziz Pasha Vrioni of Vlorë, all highly influential figures in the areas where they operated. The meeting started under the chairmanship of Qemali, while Hasan Bey asked all those present that before starting the discussion to take the Besa ('take oath' or 'word of honor'), since the meeting should be kept secret. After a summary of what had happened during the post-revolutionary period and especially the last 2 years against the Albanians, it was argued to all present that the only solution to gain the rights was through a general armed uprising. The idea of autonomy was also put forward, considering that the independence was unlikely to find support among religious fanatics or in those who were still loyal to the sultan and empire.

Hasan Bey Prishtina took on the task of organizing the other leaders of the Vilayet of Kosovo, aiming to persuade them to join the cause. Most of them until recently had been members of the CUP, such as Bedri Bey Pejani and Nexhip Bey Draga, while others such as Isa Boletini and Riza Bey Gjakova (Kryeziu), the latter at the time exiled to Anatolia, were sworn followers of Abdülhamid II, the ousted sultan by the Young Turks. Essad Pasha was the person who had read the fatwa of the dethronement in the sultan's presence. There were also those who were ready to join the revolt without much persuasive effort, such as Bajram Curri, one of the leaders of the Krasniqi at the time.

While to provide support from Great Powers and especially finding the weapons and money that would be needed for the revolt, Ismail Qemali took over promising that 15,000 Mauser rifles and about 10,000 gold Napoléons would be sent through Montenegro. He would also travel to Europe to secure outside support. Essad Pasha guaranteed that he would deal with the preparations for the uprising in central Albania and in Mirditë. Aziz Pasha with Syrja Vlora would prepare the revolt in the area of Berat and Vlorë while Mufid Libohova in that of Gjirokastër and the surrounding areas.

== Preparations and the uprising ==
On 18 January 1912, the Chamber of Deputies was dissolved by sultan Mehmet V at the instigation of the CUP, in the hope that through new elections it would replace dissident deputies with loyalists. This complicated things for some conspirators, as they would have to win a new mandate while a revolt could jeopardize their ground support. Between January and February all conspirators had returned to their areas of influence, except for Qemali who had traveled to Europe but was following the events closely through his agents in the field, including Luigj Gurakuqi, a young Catholic activist from Shkodër and Fazil Pasha Toptani, cousin of Essad Pasha, who had both long been Qemali's close associates. By the end of January, the situation in Albania, which was already bad, had considerably worsened. A further complication had arisen in the refusal to pay taxes by the peasants of the kazas of Vlorë and Gjirokastër. The tax collectors were threatened with death if they persisted and therefore sought military assistance which was explicitly refused by the local military authorities and the matter was referred to the Ministry of Interior. Local officials thought that Ismail Qemali and other figures were behind these movements.

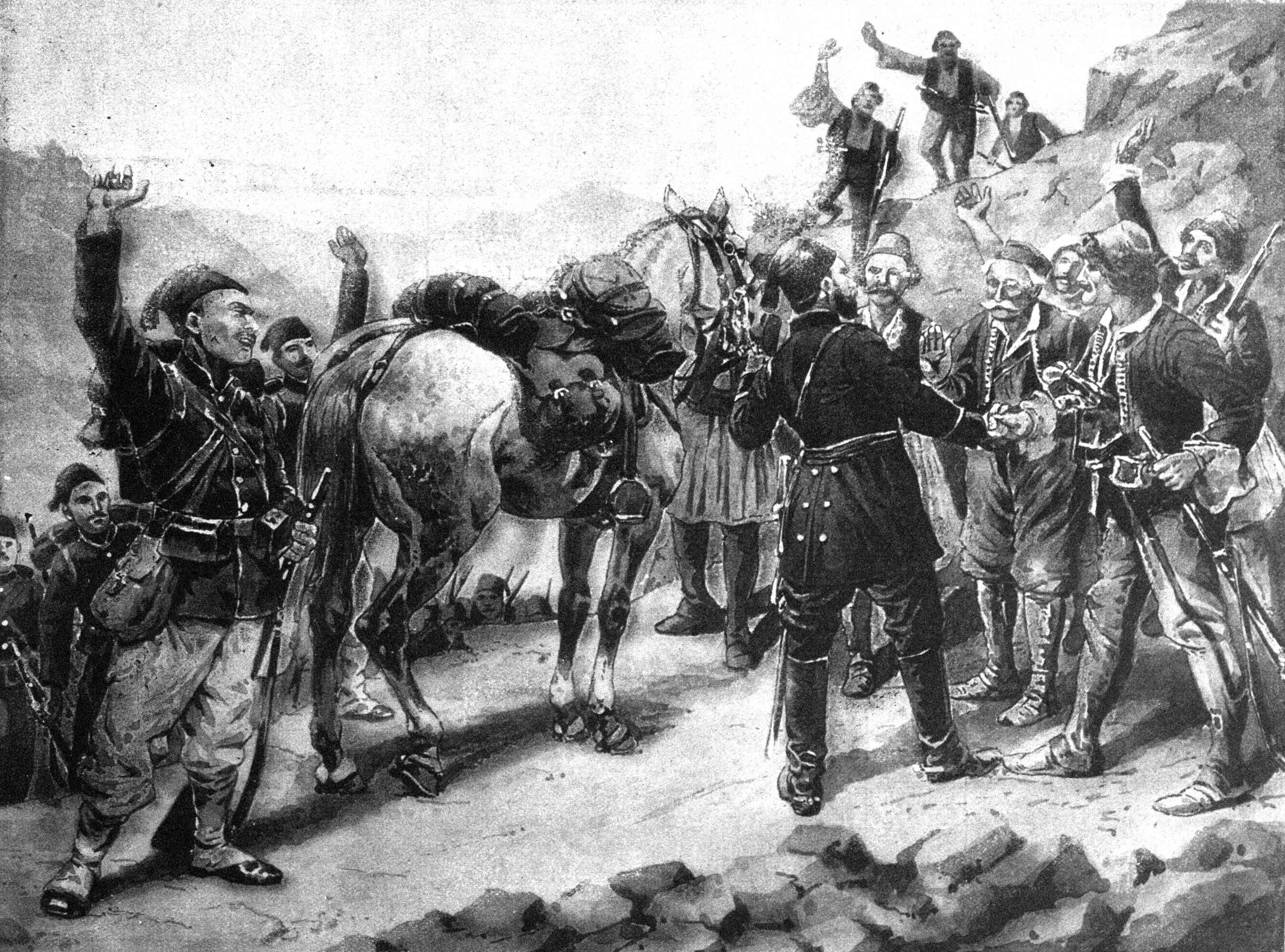
Some deserting Ottoman officers who join the uprising in the mountains of Albania illustrated by the Wiener Bilder in July 1912.

In contemporary historiography, some academics have asserted that the uprising had the support of the Freedom and Accord Party that through Riza Nur maintained through intermediaries contacts with conspirators. In fact, behind the liberals stood Prince Sabahaddin who was said to be one of the financiers of the revolt. Riza Nur had also made possible the release from exile of one of the most influential leaders in the Gjakova area, Riza Bey Gjakova (Kryeziu). He was exiled to Sinop because of the counter-coup of 1909 known as the 31 March Incident, when religious fanatics and supporters of the then incumbent Sultan tried to overthrow the Young Turk government. This claim would be supported by later authors such as Süleyman Külçe in his book Osmanli tarihinde Arnavutluk published in 1944 but would be revived by other authors of the 21st century such as Aykut Kansu. Hasan Bey Prishtina in his memoirs after the events denied the involvement of a party dominated and organized by ethic Turks in a pamphlet published in 1920, arguing that the organization of the uprising would be impossible and dangerous if they were aware of such a plan. Hasan Prishtina in response to later claims would assert: "we were not crazy enough to inform the Turks about our Albanian plot, nor would the Turks have allowed the Albanians to take up arms against their army." adding "[We] the conspirators profited from the antagonism between the political parties but without infringing in any manner on the purely national character of the plot.".

The exact date of the beginning of the Albanian General Uprising of 1912 is difficult to determine because the insurgent actions were not organized under a top-down military hierarchy. In fact, they were local, sporadic, and unrelated to each other. Continuous attacks took place in the period between January and February. They were mainly concentrated in the suburbs of Gjakova and Peja and caused some casualties to the Ottoman forces. While in the months of March and April the electoral elections had started and the reformed government of Said Pasha had sent to the insurgent areas a commission led by Interior Minister Hacı Adil Arda to negotiate with the rebel factions. The Reform Commission, as it was called, would rather serve as a tool of electoral pressure, assisting the CUP in its eminent victory. During the two months of the campaign, there were several attacks by insurgents but without much success. At the end of the election, the CUP won an absolute majority. Almost all dissident MPs in one way or another were replaced by loyalists. The electoral process in the Albanian provinces was deeply manipulated. In several constituencies where Liberal Entente or independent candidates had won, ballot boxes were filled with pro-CUP votes, and in some cases, elections were repeated. This loss motivated the conspirators to take arms in the uprising and it would be joined by other former Albanian MPs, such as Basri Bey Dukagjini deputy of Dibra.

Although Qemali had promised in the January meeting to provide weapons and funds for the uprising, he had not yet left for Europe where he hoped to provide them. In these circumstances, Pristina saw fit to sell some warehouses in the Skopje area that were in its possession to provide the necessary weapons and funds. In mid-May, it was decided to convene another kuvend by the insurgents. The Assembly would be held from 21 to 25 May 1912, this time in Junik, and was attended by delegates from different parts of the vilayet of Kosovo such as Peja, Istog, Gjakova, Has, Gjakova Highlands, Fushë-Kosovë, Vushtrri, as well as by prominent leaders of Sanjaks of Dibra and of Shkodra. From the middle of July, desertions in the army affected the course of the uprising. On 22 July 1912 in Monastir 150 pro-monarchist soldiers and their officers led by captain Tajar Tetova deserted their garrison and fled to the mountains carrying ammunition and artillery. They demanded the dissolution of the newly formed parliament, which would later result in a coup d'état. Although most of them were Albanian, their demands and objectives seemed to differ greatly from the demands of the insurgents up to that time. The so-called the Saviour Officers would later be known as the armed wing of the Liberal Entente. Meanwhile, the central government tried to make use of religious differences and pit Catholic Mirditë against the Muslims of Shkodër and those of Krujë but attempts failed. Krujë and Tirana had been getting ready for the revolt since the end of 1911 and at the end of June, they united with the insurgents of Catholic Mirditë and Zadrima.

== Aftermath ==
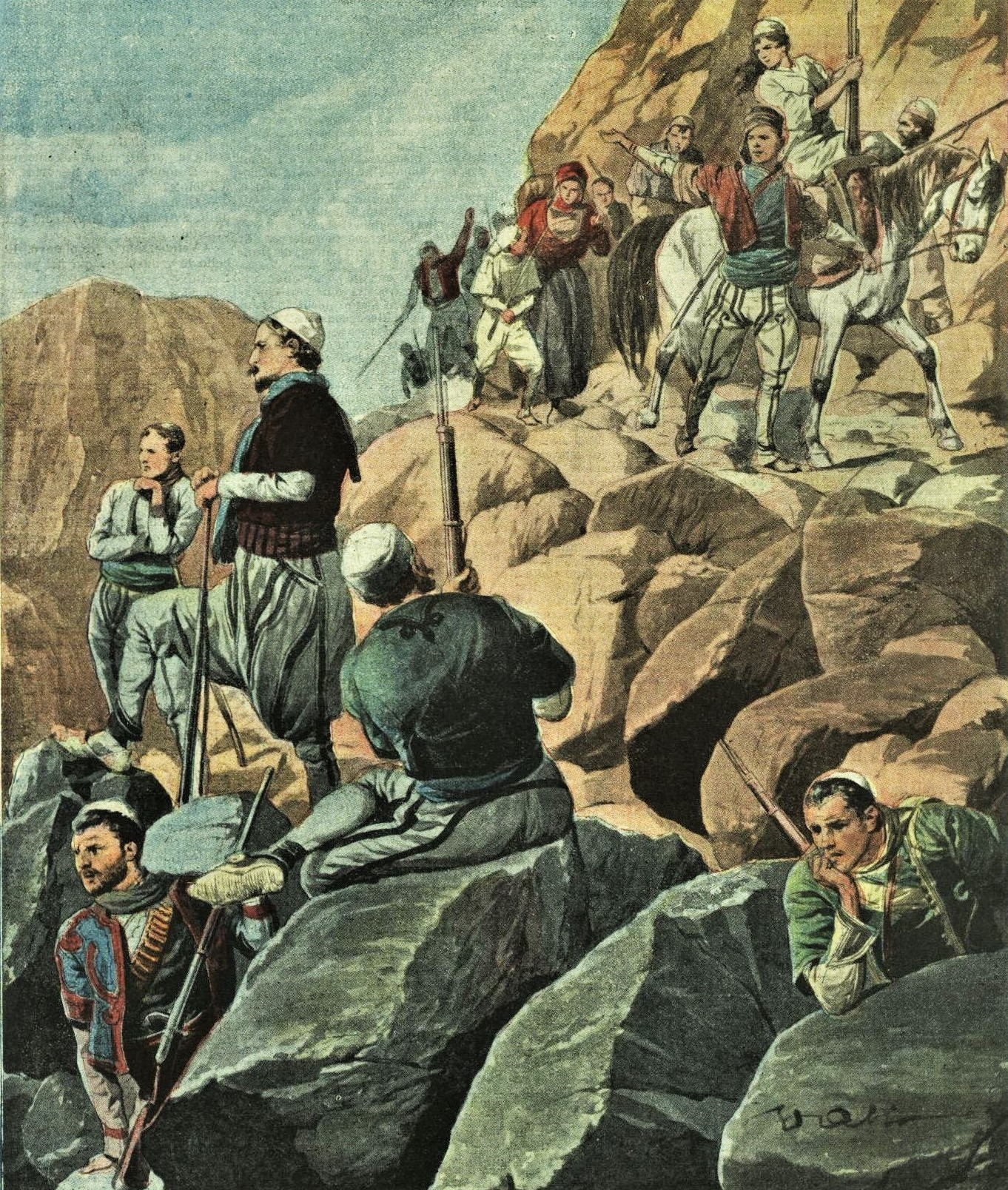
Albanian çetas watching the movements of the enemy from the mountains illustrated by the La Tribuna Illustrata in October 1912.

The Assembly of Junik re-ignited the uprising and provided better organization to the Albanian forces. After the "general besa" made by the Albanian leaders, the uprising would take on a completely different dimension from what had been seen until then. The insurgents took control of almost all cities of the Kosovo vilayet. Their activity culminated in the siege of the city of Üsküb (today Skopje) which was also the center of the vilayet. About 16,000 to 30,000 troops had joined the siege, forcing the Constantinople government to consider the insurgents' demands. The demands that were in fact formulated in the Assembly of Junik, and that were derivatives of the "Greçë Memorandum", would be widely known as the Fourteen points of Hasan Prishtina.

Meanwhile, communication between smaller çetas of insurgents with the main group of the Kosovo vilayet became increasingly difficult. The insurgents of central Albania had joined those of Mirdita, and some other groups of the Dibra area, were almost unaware of what was happening except for some telegraphs sent to the areas covered by it. Divergences between the leaders of the uprising in Kosovo vilayet also began to increase after the siege of Üsküb. Hasan Prishtina in his pamphlet of 1920 would accuse Isa Boletini and Riza bej Gjakova that after taking the city they decided to leave together with their forces and to carry out an attack on Selanik with the purpose of releasing from exile the former sultan Abdülhamid II. Such allusions would be refuted by Boletini's nephew, Tafil Boletini in his memoirs published posthumous in 1996. According to Boletini, there has never been such a plan. It was clear that the uprising was not coordinated and the insurgents' intentions were far from being the same, both those of the leaders of the main group already in Skopje, as well as those of other groups such as those of central Albania and Mirdita.

Confronted with the situation in Kosovo and growing dissent in the ranks of the Ottoman army, the Minister of War Mahmud Shevket Pasha resigned on 9 July 1912 and 8 days later the government headed by Said Pasha resigned as well. In a letter sent on 25 June 1912 to Abdi Toptani, leader of the insurgents in central Albania, Irfan bey Ohri, who was at the head of the insurgents in the Martanesh region in Dibër, asked what answer he would give if a foreign journalist came to interview him. According to him, there should have been an agreement between the insurgents, which did not happen. He did not take kindly the fact that, among the Savior Officers, some of them worked for the Liberal Entente and not for the Albanian cause. Doubts were also expressed about Hasan Prishtina himself, who in newspaper articles stated that it was an uprising against the Young Turk government. According to Irfan Ohri, some leaders from Dibra had promised in return that they would fight for Albania and not for the Liberal Entente party. At the beginning of August, Marshal Ibrahim Pasha entered into negotiations with the leaders of Albanian insurgents in Üsküb. About those days, Abdi Toptani wrote to Kosovar leaders that coordination was needed first and foremost. He complained to Hasan Prishtina that he had not received any news from him about his programme or the situation in Kosovo. They had prepared three drafts for a memorandum, ranging from autonomy to simple administrative decentralization and hoped to discuss in advance with other insurgents. According to Gawrych, beys like Nexhip Draga and Hasan Prishtina were more interested in finding a compromise with the new government because they did not enjoy the strong support that local leaders from Kosovo had among the population. That same month, the government would accept most of the demands made by Albanian leaders.

On 8 October 1912, Montenegro suddenly declared war on the Ottoman Empire, and invaded Albania, aiming to capture Shkodra, Gjakova, Peja with Prizren. Serbia, Bulgaria and Greece would soon follow Montenegro by declaring war on the Sublime Porte, which was on the verge of complete collapse. While the war was ongoing, on 28 November 1912, Albania, with the support of Austria-Hungary, would declare independence from the Ottoman Empire. In response to the occupation of the hitherto Ottoman lands by the Balkan neighbors, the new state would not take part in the fighting by maintaining a neutral stance, giving no reason to fight over now independent Albanian lands and cities. However, Albania's borders would be officially recognized only a year later by the Conference of the Ambassadors, and not include all the territory Albania claimed. The First Balkan War, would conclude with the Ottoman Empire losing the territories inhabited by an Albanian majority in favor of neighboring states. The Conference would later award Serbia almost the entire vilayet of Kosovo and a large part of the vilayet of Manastir. Greece took part of the vilayet of Ioannina and the rest of the vilayet of Manastir which it would share with Serbia and Bulgaria. Montenegro tried to take Shkodra, which it had been besieging for more than 6 months. The city was defended first by the Ottoman forces under the command of Hasan Rıza Pasha and then Essad Pasha Toptani, who handed it over about 5 months after the independence of Albania and 2 months after the Conference of Ambassadors in London. In the conference, under pressure from Austria-Hungary and Italy, Shkodra was officially recognized as part of Albania which was recognized as an independent and sovereign principality. As a result of the disintegration of the Ottoman Empire and the wars that followed it, more than half of the Albanian population would remain outside the official territory of the Albanian state.

== See also ==
- Siege of Scutari of 1912–1913

== Notes ==
=== References ===
- Blumi, Isa (2013), "Impacts of the Balkan Wars: The Uncharted Paths from Empire to Nation-State", in Yavuz, M. Hakan; Blumi, Isa (eds.), War and Nationalism: The Balkan Wars, 1912-1913, and Their Sociopolitical Implications, University of Utah Press, ISBN 978-1-60781-240-1
- Cana, Zekeria (2009), "Rreth kryengritjes së vitit 1912" [About the 1912 uprising], Gjurmime Albanologjike - Seria e Shkencave Historike (in Albanian) (39): 9–23, ISSN 0350-6258
- Clayer, Nathalie (2009), Në fillimet e nacionalizmit shqiptar: lindja e një kombi me shumicë myslimane në Evropë [The origins of Albanian nationalism: The birth of a predominantly Muslim nation in Europe] (in Albanian), translated by Puto, Artan, Botime Përpjekja, ISBN 978-99956-786-0-9; Original in French ISBN 978-2-84586-816-8
- Clayer, Nathalie (2013), "Edhe një herë mbi kryengritjet shqiptare të pasvitit 1908" [Once more on the Albanian uprisings after 1908], Përpjekja (in Albanian) (30–31): 85–122, ISSN 2073-4107
- Elsie, Robert; Destani, Bejtullah D. (2019-07-25), Kosovo, A Documentary History: From the Balkan Wars to World War II, Bloomsbury Academic, ISBN 978-1-83860-003-7
- Frashëri, Kristo (2004), Historia e Tiranës [The history of Tirana] (in Albanian), Botimet Toena, ISBN 99927-1-897-8
- Gawrych, George (2006), The Crescent and the Eagle: Ottoman rule, Islam and the Albanians, 1874–1913, London: I.B. Tauris, ISBN 978-1-84511-287-5
- Gostentschnigg, Kurt (2017-12-14), Wissenschaft im Spannungsfeld von Politik und Militär: Die österreichisch-ungarische Albanologie 1867-1918 [Science in the field of tensions between politics and the military: Austro-Hungarian Albanian Studies 1867-1918] (in German), Springer Fachmedien Wiesbaden, ISBN 978-3-658-18910-5
- Ikonomi, Ilir (2012), Pavarësia: Udhëtimi i paharruar i Ismail Qemalit [Independence: The unforgettable path of Ismail Qemali] (in Albanian), UET Press, ISBN 978-99956-39-76-1
- Kadria, Sali (2016), "Mbi disa Çështje të Kryengritjes Shqiptare të Vitit 1912" [On some issues of the Albanian revolt in 1912], Studime Historike (in Albanian) (1–02): 115–150, ISSN 0563-5799
- Kansu, Aykut (2021-11-22) [2000], Politics in Post-Revolutionary Turkey, 1908-1913, BRILL, ISBN 978-90-04-49182-3
- Malcolm, Noel (2002), Kosovo: A Short History, Pan Books, ISBN 978-0-330-41224-7
- Marku, Paulin (2017). "Përpjekja e Perandorisë Osmane për të stabilizuar situatën në viset shqiptare: Komisioni i reformave i Haxhi Adil Beut (shkurt-prill 1912)" [The Efforts of the Ottoman Empire to Stabilize the Situation in Albanian Territories: The Reforms Commission of Haxhi Adil Bey (February –April 1912)]. Studime Historike (in Albanian) (1‒02): 101‒124. ISSN 0563-5799.
- Skendi, Stavro (2015-12-08) [1967], The Albanian National Awakening, Princeton University Press, ISBN 978-1-4008-4776-1
- Vickers, Miranda (1999), The Albanians: A Modern History, Bloomsbury Academic, ISBN 978-1-86064-541-9
