= Ajdin Draga =

Albanian politician

Ajdin Draga (1864–1914) was an Albanian politician. In 1912, he was a representative of Kosovo in the Albanian Declaration of Independence and a member of the Albanian Senate.

== Life ==
Ajdin Draga was born in Mojstir, in the Vilayet of Kosovo, Ottoman Empire, today's Tutin, Serbia in 1864 to the Draga family. His father Ali Pasha Draga was a notable landowner of the region. His brothers, Nexhip and Ferhat, also activists of the Albanian National Awakening, led the Xhemijet party of Yugoslavia in the interwar period. In November 1912 he participated in the Assembly of Vlorë, in which the independence of Albania was declared and a national congress was formed. The deputies of the national congress also elected eighteen delegates of the assembly to form the Albanian Senate, of which Ajdin Draga was a member as a senator of Kosovo along with Salih Gjuka and Bedri Pejani. He died in June 1914 in a battle against Essadist forces in Rashbull, Durrës.
