= List of Albanians in Switzerland =

The following is a list of notable Swiss people of Albanian descent.

== History and politics ==
- Agron Beqiri – politician
- Arbër Bullakaj – politician
- Arife Asipi – lawyer and politician
- Hamit Zeqiri – social worker and migration specialist
- Hilmi Gashi – trade unionist and politician
- Islam Alijaj – politician and disability-rights activist
- Përparim Avdili – politician
- Qëndresa Sadriu – politician
- Skënder Zogu – author and member of the House of Zogu
- Ylli Doko – politician
- Ylfete Fanaj – politician

== Literature and journalism ==
- Albert Ramaj – author, editor and director of the Albanian Institute in St. Gallen
- Elvira Dones – writer, screenwriter and documentary filmmaker
- Etrit Hasler – poet, journalist and author
- Gülsha Adilji – journalist and television presenter
- Shqipe Sylejmani – journalist and author

== Business and economy ==
- Arben Ademi – entrepreneur and founder of Gisada Switzerland
- Avni Orllati – businessman and founder of the Orllati Group
- Behgjet Pacolli – businessman and founder of Mabetex
- Jeton Tolaj – businessman and chief executive officer of Wirz Bauunternehmungen
- Kristian Kabashi – entrepreneur and co-founder of Numarics
- Liridona Makica – entrepreneur and founder of Spitex Dona
- Rexhep Rexhepi – watchmaker and founder of Akrivia
- Vllaznim Xhiha – entrepreneur and philanthropist

== Science and academia ==
- Bashkim Iseni – political scientist and founder of Albinfo.ch
- Avdulla Krasniqi – physician and gynecologist
- Emrush Rexhaj – cardiologist and medical researcher
- Florim Cuculi – cardiologist and professor of medicine
- Hazbi Avdiji – academic and professor of information systems
- Nenad Stojanović – political scientist and professor
- Omer Xhemali – cardiac surgeon and medical researcher

== Arts and entertainment ==
- Arben Biba – actor
- Barış Arduç – actor and model
- Bendrit Bajra – comedian and actor
- Dardan Shabani – Swiss-Kosovar actor, director and writer
- Patrick Nuo – singer and actor
- Xheneta Imeri – visual artist

== Music ==
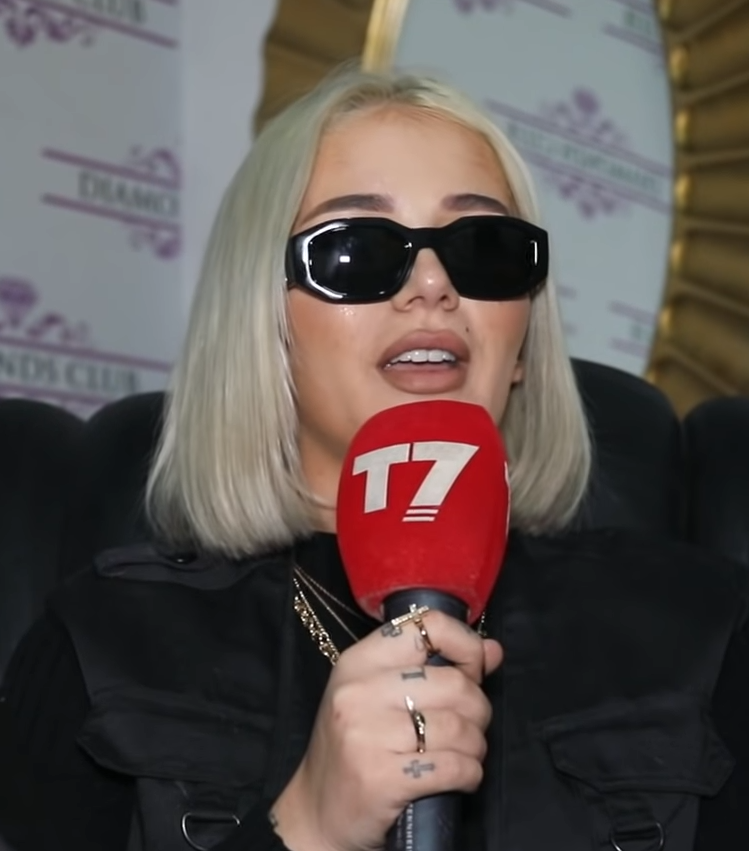
Loredana Zefi is a popular female german-speaking rapper.

- Edita Abdieski – singer
- Elina Duni – jazz singer and composer
- EAZ – rapper and singer
- Florat – rapper and producer
- Fortesa Hoti – singer
- Gjon's Tears – singer and songwriter
- Ilira – singer and songwriter
- Loredana Zefi – rapper and singer
- Marash Pulaj – rapper and television presenter
- Xen – rapper

== Fashion ==
- Angela Martini – model and beauty pageant titleholder
- Artnesa Krasniqi – model and beauty pageant titleholder
- Cendrine Berisha – model and beauty pageant contestant
- Kështjella Pepshi – model and beauty pageant titleholder

== Sports ==
=== Football ===
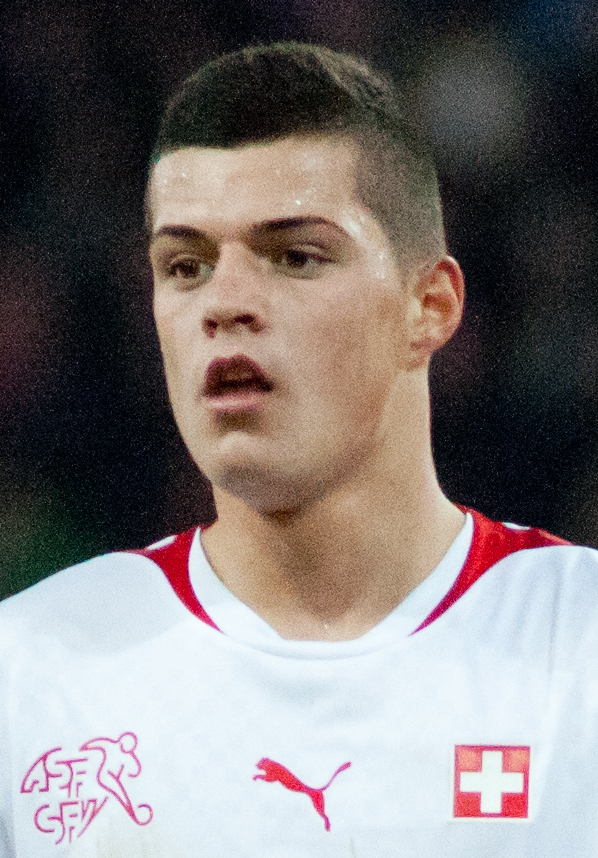
Granit Xhaka is the most capped player in the history of the Swiss national football team.

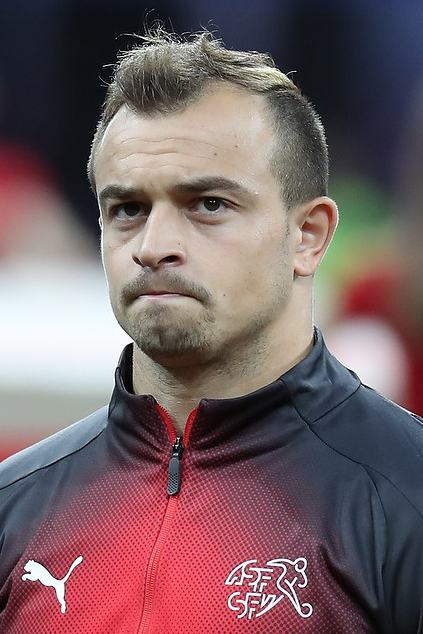
Xherdan Shaqiri playing for Switzerland.

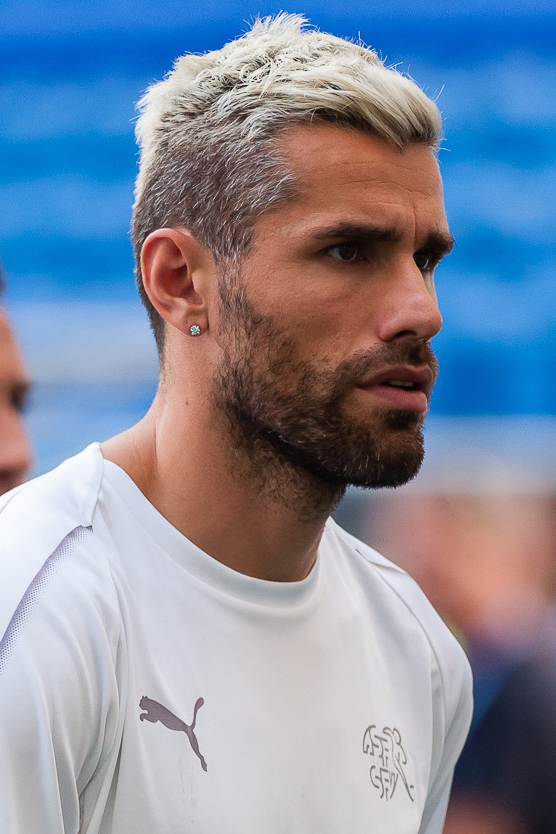
Valon Behrami was capped 83 times for the Swiss national football team.

- Admir Mehmedi – footballer
- Adrian Bajrami – footballer
- Albian Ajeti – footballer
- Almen Abdi – footballer
- Amir Abrashi – footballer
- Andi Zeqiri – footballer
- Arbenit Xhemajli – footballer
- Ardon Jashari – footballer
- Arijanet Muric – footballer
- Arlind Ajeti – footballer
- Bastien Toma – footballer
- Berat Djimsiti – footballer
- Blerim Džemaili – footballer
- Cendrim Kameraj – footballer
- Eris Abedini – footballer
- Florent Hadergjonaj – footballer
- Frédéric Veseli – footballer
- Granit Xhaka – footballer
- Hekuran Kryeziu – footballer
- Idriz Voca – footballer
- Izer Aliu – footballer
- Mërgim Brahimi – footballer
- Mirlind Kryeziu – footballer
- Milaim Rama – footballer
- Nedim Bajrami – footballer
- Pajtim Kasami – footballer
- Shani Tarashaj – footballer
- Shkelqim Demhasaj – footballer
- Shkëlzen Gashi – footballer
- Taulant Xhaka – footballer
- Valon Behrami – footballer
- Xherdan Shaqiri – footballer

=== Boxing and kickboxing ===
- Azem Maksutaj – kickboxer
- Hysni Beqiri – kickboxer
- Nuri Seferi – professional boxer
- Shemsi Beqiri – kickboxer
- Xhavit Bajrami – kickboxer
