= Capture of Pristina =

Battle in the Albanian revolt of 1912

- Part of Albanian revolt of 1912
Date	21–22 July 1912
Location	Priştine, Kosovo Vilayet, now Kosovo
Result	Albanian victory: Kosovo Vilayet under full control of the Albanian rebels

Belligerents
Albanian rebels	Ottoman Empire

Commanders and leaders
Hasan Prishtina; Bajram Curri	Ismail Fazıl Pasha (surrendered)

Units involved
Rebels from; Gjilan; Kaçanik; Prizren; Tetovo	Prishtina Garrison

Strength
10,000–12,000 rebels	60,000 soldiers

Casualties and losses
Unknown	200 Ottoman soldiers killed

The Capture of Pristina (Albanian: Pushtimi i Prishtinës) was a pivotal event during the Albanian revolt of 1912, it involved the entry of Albanian rebels into the former capital of the Kosovo vilayet.

== Background ==
=== Siege of Peja ===
In Peja, a fierce uprising unfolded as Xhafer Tajari valiantly resisted, though Turkish forces eventually broke through, forcing rebels towards Rugova and Plava. Despite setbacks, Albanian morale remained resilient.

=== Battle of Prush Pass ===
Bajram Curri's Krasniqi tribe secured a crucial victory at Prush Pass in Has, scattering four Turkish battalions. The Turks, misled about rebel intentions, returned to Gjakova demoralized. This triumph not only lifted spirits but also prompted dissatisfied officers to express opposition to the Young Turk regime, sympathizing with the Albanian cause.

== Capture ==
Within the space of a few days, over 10,000-12,000 rebels converged outside Pristina, determined to claim the town. Forces from Gjilan, Kaçanik, Prizren, and Tetova strategically secured positions.

Facing military preparations from the Pristina garrison, a daring act unfolded at the telegraph office. A group of Albanian men from Pristina confronted Ismail Fazıl Pasha, shoving a pistol into his mouth and threatening him to sign an order prohibiting the Ottoman army in the trenches from resisting if the Albanian rebels attempted to take the town. This decisive move not only avoided the risk of bloody conflict but also facilitated a seamless transition of Priştine into the epicenter of the rebellion, with the enthusiastic participation of the town's populace swelling the rebel ranks to 30,000.

== Aftermath ==
The fall of Pristina put the entire Vilayet of Kosovo under the control of the rebels, Panic spread in Istanbul and leading to the resignation of Grand Vizier Said Pasha. Kâmil Pasha formed a new cabinet, initiating negotiations with Albanian leaders.

In August 1912, less than a month after the Albanian rebels captured Pristina, they marched to Üskup and seized it, ending the Albanian revolt of 1912.
