= Sylejmani =

Sylejmani is an Albanian surname. People with the name include:

- Fadil Sylejmani (1940–2013), Albanian university professor from North Macedonia
- Hivzi Sylejmani, Yugoslav writer
- Sylejman Sylejmani (1953–2017), Albanian academic and politician
- Xhafer Sylejmani (1878–1953), Albanian physician and politician
