= Stinë dashurie =

- Genre: Drama; Romance; Telenovela; Soap opera
- Developed by: Lulzim Rexha
- Written by: Ardian Haxhaj; Arian Krasniqi
- Directed by: Gazmend Nela
- Starring: Arben Biba; Albulena Kryeziu; Edona Reshitaj; Dibran Tahiri; Myrvete Kurtishi; Bislim Muçaj; Irena Cahani; Armend Baloku; Mevlyd Osmani; Aurita Agushi; Labinot Lajçi; Muhamed Arifi; Anisa Ismaili; Florim Brajshori; Ilir Prapashtica; Lulzim Guhelli; Mybera Berisha; Blerim Qeriqi; Abdullah Gjikokaj; Donikë Ahmeti; Afrim Muçaj
- Theme music composer: Memli Kelmendi
- Opening theme: "Më rrëshqet nga dora" performed by Vita Guhelli
- Country of origin: Kosovo
- Original language: Albanian
- No. of seasons: 2
- No. of episodes: 36

Production
- Executive producers: Trim Musliu; Lulzim Guhelli
- Producer: Blerim Qeriqi
- Editor: Kreshnik Haxhidauti
- Camera setup: Amir Vitia; Arian Haliti
- Running time: 30 minutes
- Production company: Cineproduction

Original release
- Network: RTK
- Release: March 9, 2014 – April 2015

Stinë dashurie (English: Love season) is a Kosovan television soap opera, created and directed by Gazmend Nela.

The series premiered on RTK, the public service broadcaster in Kosovo, on Sunday, March 9, 2014, at 8:30 p.m. It is a production of Cineproduction. Shooting for the second season started on October 1, 2014 and ended in April 2015.

== Overview ==
The television series addresses issues that are prevalent to modern Kosovo. Alban Krasniqi (Arben Biba), who lives in Switzerland, comes to Kosovo to work for EULEX. Here, he meets an Albanian girl, Mimoza Ukaj (Albulena Kryeziu) and falls in love with her. What Alban doesn't know is that their families have been feuding for years. The series deals with concepts of ideal love, and other elements of modern Albanian society such as corruption and blood feud.

== Episodes ==
Season	Episodes	Timeslot	Season premiere	Season finale	TV channel
1	13	Sunday 20:30	March 9, 2014	Summer 2014	RTK
2	23	Sunday 20:30	October 1, 2014	April 2015	RTK
