= Gani Bey Kryeziu =

Kosovo Albanian anti-communist resistance fighter (1900-1952)

Gani Bey Kryeziu

Gani Bey Kryeziu (1900 – 1952) was a Kosovo Albanian anti-communist resistance fighter.

== Biography ==
Gani Kryeziu was born in Gjakova, Vilayet of Kosovo, Ottoman Albania, as a member of powerful Kryeziu family, a ruling family derived from the Ottoman cast. He was the brother of Ceno Bey Kryeziu, Albanian politician and diplomat known as a Serbian agent, as well as Said Bey and Hasan Bey, both resistance and anti-communists fighters, and son of Riza Bey Kryeziu, an influential local bey who had contributed in the League of Junik and was one of activists of Albanian national movements of early 20th century.

Gani grew up in Serbia, attended a military academy in Sarajevo, and served in the Serbian army in early '20s, as well as aide-de-camp for Alexander I of Yugoslavia, and for a short time in Albania during 1925 after the June Revolution and Zogu coming into power. He would become an enemy of Ahmet Zogu after the assassination of his brother Ceno in Prague in 1927 by Alkiviadh Bebi, and agent of Ahmet Zogu.

In 1932, he and his brother were sentenced to death in absence for trying to disturb the internal order.
With the Italian Invasion of Albania he joined the resistance, while keeping tight contacts with the British Intelligence. The British tried to send him in Kukës region to proclaim himself as the ruler of an autonomous Albania, in contrast with the Fascist Albanian state, but the project never came to life. The Germans caught him, imprisoned in Zemun, and later handed over to the Italians, who imprisoned him. After the invasion of Italy in 1943, he returned to Albania helped by Mehmet Bey Konica. He gathered up a group of fighters with the support of his kin, and proclaim to combat the Germans. Enver Hoxha would mention him as a Serbian agent,... he and his crew never really shot a gun against the Germans. Hoxha would consider him as an important adversary to liquidate. Gani continued to fight, as a key member of the Western-backed anti-communist subversion with the support of the British side (Sir Jocelyn Percy and Dayrell Oakley-Hil), but was caught in a fire triangle between the Germans, Albanian partisans, and Kosovo partisans of Fadil Hoxha. The Albanian partisans caught him in 1945, handed him over to the Yugoslavian communists who surprisingly sentenced him to only five years of hard labor.

In 1949, he founded the "League of Albanian Political Refugees" in Prizren, which headquarters will reside in Shkup, and a military base in Peja, together with Cen Elezi (1884 - 1949), and helped sending insurgents to Albania with the support of American, British (who had intervened to the Yugoslavian side for his release) and Yugoslavian intelligence, somehow lacking coordination with the "National Committee for a Free Albania" of Mit'hat Frashëri where his brother Said was a co-founder. Gani's and Elezi's men would cross the border in the area of Prizren, into the Albanian territory, declaring war on the communists in power and agitating for an Albanian-Yugoslavian friendship. Cen Elezi would over-trust the Yugoslavs, he got arrested by the Yugoslavian authorities, and considering the nationalist background of his family and lack of the credibility that Kryeziu had, would spend months in interrogation rooms, until his body gave up and died in 1949. On February 28, 1950, The New York Times reported that two teams of Albanian anti-communist units, trained in Malta, had landed in Albania with instructions to contact Gani's men in the north. They were ambushed and the operation failed.

Gani Kryeziu died during the course of 1952.

== See also ==
- Communism in Albania
- Communism in Yugoslavia
- Albanian Subversion
- Kryeziu Brothers
