= Albanian revolt of 1912 =

Rebellion against Ottoman rule

- Üskup (modern-day Skopje) after its capture by Albanian revolutionaries The Albanian revolt of 1912, depicted in Gazeta ilustrată
Date	January–August 1912
Location	Ottoman Albania
Result	Albanian victory; Full results: De-jure establishment of the Albanian Vilayet (4 September 1912). The establishment of an Albanian Vilayet was decided on 4 September 1912 following the Albanian revolt of 1912. The negotiations were interrupted after the outbreak of the First Balkan War in October 1912.; De-facto control of substantial territories corresponding to the proposed Albanian Vilayet by August 1912, including the entire Kosovo Vilayet and towns in central and southern Albania and Macedonia.; Captured: Kosovo Vilayet: Skopje; Pristina; Novi Pazar; Gjakova; Peja; Prizren; Mitrovica; Vučitrn; Gjilan; Ferizaj; Sjenica; Tetova Monastir Vilayet: Elbasan; Debar Janina Vilayet: Konitsa; Përmet; Leskovik; Ottoman acceptance of the rebels' "Fourteen Points" demands on 4 September 1912, including demands concerning administration, Albanian-language education, and military service.; Control maintained until the outbreak of the First Balkan War in October 1912, after which Albanian leaders declared independence on November 28, 1912.

Belligerents
Albanian rebels	Ottoman Empire

Commanders and leaders
Isa Boletini; Idriz Seferi; Ismail Qemali; Hasan Prishtina; Nexhip Draga; Bajram Curri; Haxhi Vehbi Dibra; Riza bej Gjakova; Essad Pasha Toptani; Elez Isufi; Çerçiz Topulli; Demir Lena; Xhafer Tajari	Mehmed V Ahmet Resber; Ismail Fazıl Pasha (surrendered); Ibrahim Pasha; Kara Said Pasha

Strength
15,000–30,000	60,000 (at the Capture of Pristina)

The Albanian revolt of 1912 (Albanian: Kryengritja e vitit 1912, "Uprising of 1912") was the last revolt against the Ottoman Empire's rule in Albania and lasted from January until August 1912. The revolt ended when the Ottoman government agreed to fulfill the rebels' demands on 4 September 1912. Generally, Muslim Albanians fought against the Ottomans then governed by the Committee of Union and Progress.

== Prelude ==
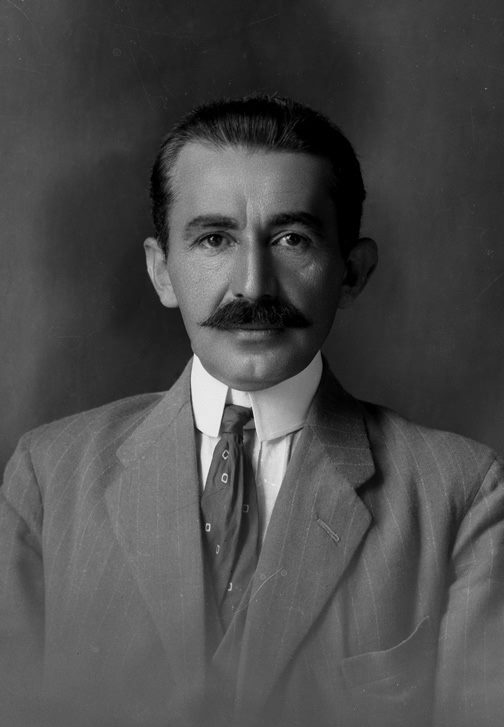
Hasan Prishtina

The main reasons for all these revolts were changes for Albanians introduced by the Committee of Union and Progress (CUP), including tax increases, conscription for Albanians in the Ottoman army, and the disarming of the Albanian civil population.

Albanians were not the only group to start a rebellion against the CUP government. There were insurgencies in Syria and on the Arab peninsula.

The first major Albanian revolt in 1910 led by Isa Boletini and Idriz Seferi was supported by Bulgaria and Montenegro. After two weeks of fierce fighting the Albanian rebels and Isa Boletini withdrew to the Drenicë region, while Idriz Seferi withdrew with his remaining soldiers to the Karadak region, where he continued his resistance. Sultan Mehmed V visited Pristina in June 1911 and declared an amnesty for all of those who had participated in the revolt, except for the ones who had committed murder. In order to calm the situation, the sultan introduced a number of concessions, including:

1. The establishment of Albanian schools.
2. Military service was to be restricted to the territory of Kosovo Vilayet.
3. Suspension of all conscription and taxes for two years.
4. Appointment of government officials who speak the Albanian language.

At the end of 1911 a group of Albanian Members, led by Ismail Qemali, started a debate in the Ottoman parliament. They requested additional rights for Albanians in the cultural and administrative spheres.

In January 1912, Hasan Prishtina, an Albanian deputy in the Ottoman parliament, publicly warned MPs that the policy of the CUP government would lead to a revolution in Albania. After that speech Qemali proposed a meeting with Prishtina. They met the same evening in Prishtina's house and agreed to organize an Albanian uprising. The following day they met in the Pera Palace Hotel in Istanbul with Mufid Bey Libohova, Essad Pasha Toptani, Aziz Pasha Vrioni and Syreja Bey Vlora. They agreed to unite their organizations and lead the Albanian uprising. Subsequently, they took an oath on this promise at a meeting in Syreja Bey's house in Taxim.

== Events ==
It was decided that Ismail Qemali should organize the delivery of 15,000 Mauser rifles to the Kosovo Vilayet via the Kingdom of Montenegro. Hassan Prishtina attempted to get the support of Bulgaria by proposing the creation of an Albanian–Macedonian state to Pavlof, the Bulgarian deputy, who met him in the British Consulate in Skopje. The British Consul from Skopje promised that the United Kingdom would provide strong support to the Albanians. Serbian representatives also supplied weapons to some Albanian rebels, including Isa Boletini and Riza Bey Gjakova. Hasan Prishtina regarded Serbian intervention as contributing to divisions among the Albanian rebels and weakening their movement. He stated that the Serbian consul and Ottoman officials had succeeded in “sowing the seeds of division” among the Albanian leadership. Prishtina describes the Serbian consul's intervention with Riza Bey and Isa Boletini, the subsequent receipt of rifles from Serbia, and the role of the Serbian consul in contributing to divisions among the Albanian leaders.

The revolt started in the western part of Kosovo Vilayet and was led by Hasan Pristina, Nexhip Draga, Bajram Curri, Riza bej Gjakova and others. Prishtina who was in the Kosovo Vilayet during the revolt, and Qemali who was in Europe gathering weapons and money and attempting to win over European public opinion to the cause of the uprising, maintained communication through the British Consulate in Skopje. Essad Pasha Toptani obliged himself to organize the uprising in Central Albania and Mirdita.

Albanian soldiers and officers deserted the Ottoman military service and joined the insurgents.

=== List of demands ===
The Albanian rebels in Kosovo Vilayet demanded a number of actions from the Young Turk administration. These demands were printed in emigrant newspapers published in Bulgaria in the middle of March 1912, including the appointment of Albanians in government administration, schools with Albanian as the medium of instruction, and the restriction of Albanians' conscription in the Ottoman Army to the Kosovo Vilayet.

Albanian rebels were divided; some supported the CUP government, others the Freedom and Accord Party, while some even wished to return to Abdul Hamid's autocracy.

On 9 August 1912, Albanian rebels presented a new list of demands (the so-called list of Fourteen Points), related to a hypothetical Albanian Vilayet, that can be summarized as follows:

- an autonomous system of administration and justice in four vilayets populated with Albanians (Albanian Vilayet),
- Albanians to perform military service only in the four principally-Albanian vilayets, except in time of war,
- employment of officials who knew local language and customs (though not necessarily Albanians),
- new lycées and agricultural schools in the bigger districts,
- reorganization and modernization of the religious schools and the use of the Albanian language in secular schools,
- freedom to establish private schools and societies,
- the development of trade, agriculture and public works,
- general amnesty for all the Albanians involved in the revolt,
- court martial of those Ottoman officers who had attempted to suppress the revolt.

On 17 July, the rebels took over Gjakova. On 21-22 they held Pristina and Novi Pazar. By the end of the month, they had also captured Mitrovica, Vucitrn, Peja, Gjilan and Ferizaj. Some 25,000 of them held Pristina while another 20,000 held the south-eastern corner of Kosovo. By 14 August, they occupied Skopje, putting additional pressure on the Ottomans.

The Ottoman government ended the Albanian revolts by accepting all demands (ignoring only the last) on 4 September 1912. Prishtina was planning to start another revolt in three or four months and then declare Albanian independence but the First Balkan War broke out soon and destroyed his plans.

== Aftermath ==
The success of the Albanian Revolt and news from the Italo-Turkish War sent a strong signal to the neighboring countries that the Ottoman Empire was weak. The members of the Balkan League decided that they could not waste such a golden opportunity to strike at a weakened Ottoman state. The prospect of Albanian autonomy was incompatible with Serbian ambitions for the annexation of these territories. The Kingdom of Serbia opposed the plan for this rather large Albanian state (whose territories are now considered to be the concept of Greater Albania). The European territory of the Ottoman Empire was eventually taken by the four Balkan allies.

== See also ==
- Taksim meeting
- Albanian Revolt of 1910
- Albanian historiography

== Sources ==
- Prishtina, Hasan (1921). Nji shkurtim kujtimesh mbi kryengritjen shqiptare të vjetit 1912. Shkrue prej Hassan Prishtinës [Hasan Bey Prishtina: Brief Memoir on the Albanian Uprising of 1912] (Translated by Robert Elsie) (in Albanian). Shkodra: Shtypshkroja Franciskane. Archived from the original on July 23, 2011.
- Shaw, Stanford J. Shaw; Shaw, Ezel Kural (2002) [1977]. "Clearing the Decks: Ending the Tripolitanian War and the Albanian Revolt". History of the Ottoman Empire and modern Turkey. Vol. 2. United Kingdom: The Press Syndicate of University of Cambridge. ISBN 978-0-521-29166-8.
