= O sa mirë =

- Genre: Sitcom
- Created by: Ard Islami
- Directed by: Ilir Bokshi; Valter Lucaj
- Starring: Enver Petrovci; Olta Daku; Luran Ahmeti; Shkelzen Veseli; Ard Islami; Jonida Vokshi; Xhevdet Jashari; Helidon Fino; Armend Ismaili; Eftiola Laçka; Edi Kastrati; Jeton Zogiani; Linda Jarani; Kushtrim Qerimi; Besnik Krapi; Anita Nikaj; Ernest Zymberi; Ema Uka; Fisnik Ademi; Ylber Bardhi
- Country of origin: Kosovo
- Original language: Albanian
- No. of seasons: 6
- No. of episodes: 183

Production
- Executive producer: Fisnik Vejsa
- Production locations: Pristina, Kosovo
- Running time: 35-40 minutes
- Production companies: K-Studio Production; Gurmania Channel; OSMGROUP

Original release
- Network: T HD
- Release: October 7, 2013 – May 16, 2016
- Network: Kohavision
- Release: October 30, 2016 – July 2, 2017
- Network: Klan Kosova
- Release: October 29, 2017 – March 17, 2020

O sa mirë (lit. 'Oh How Nice') is a Kosovan television sitcom. It premiered on T HD, on October 7, 2013. The renewed series is produced by Gurmania J.S.C. and it airs on Klan Kosova.

The series follows a group of students at the private university O sa mirë. The students come from different Albanian-speaking regions of Albania, Kosovo, North Macedonia, and Montenegro. The sitcom bases its humor on Albanian regional stereotypes and the interactions between the different sub-cultures.

== Premise ==
Students from Albanian-speaking regions of Albania, Kosovo, Macedonia, and Montenegro, attend the private university O sa mirë. Following the day-to-day life of the students, misunderstandings often occur due to different spoken Albanian dialects, as well as comical situations involving the teachers. The show focuses on the members of the Physics, History, Music, Physical Education, and English classes of the university.

== Cast ==
- Enver Petrovci as Gazmend Berisha, the Rector of the university.
- Olta Daku as Jana Hajdari, the Physics teacher who originates from Fier.
- Helidon Fino as Alfred Havolli, a student from Tirana. He is Rrahman Havolli's cousin.
- Armend Ismaili as Rron Gazuli, a student from Pristina. Used to live in Dublin.
- Jonida Vokshi as Elizabeta Berisha, a student and daughter of the Rector, Gazmend Berisha. Originates from Tirana. Used to live in Milan.
- Xhevdet Jashari as Arifhikmet Abdylmenafi, a student from Tetovo.
- Eftiola Laçka as Sara Kocaqi, a student from Korça.
- Edi Kastrati as Arbnor Ramabaja, a student from Gjakova.
- Jeton Zogiani as Haki Kurtaj, a student from Drenica. Works in the government of Kosovo.
- Shkelzen Veseli as Benjamin Shehu, the music teacher.
- Linda Jarani as Rozafa Kroi, a student from villages of Shkodër.
- Besnik Krapi as Mensur Özil, a student from Prizren.
- Kushtrim Qerimi as Rrahman Havolli, a student from Podujeva. He is Alfred Havolli's cousin.
- Luran Ahmeti as the History teacher, originates from Skopje.
- Koço Devole as Akil Boga, the History teacher. Originates from Berat. (season 1)
- Albulena Kryeziu as Tringa Belegu, a student from Peja. Used to live in New York City. (season 1)
- Ylber Bardhi as Zuka, the bartender at the schools coffeehouse, originates from Deçan.
- Ema Uka as Lyra, a student from Pristina. Used to live in California.
- Anita Nikaj as Lul Gruda, a student from Tuzi.
- Majlinda Kasumoviç as the secretary of the Rector who originates from Pristina.
- Ernest Zymberi as Llukman Avdili, a student from Bujanovac.
- Gent Hazizi as Aleks Qako, a student from Lazarat.

== Broadcast ==
The series premiered on October 7, 2013. The first season consisted of 12 episodes. The second season started broadcasting on January 27, 2014. The third season consisted of 30 episodes. The third season was supposed to be the last, but it was renewed for a fourth season; only half of the cast from the previous seasons returned. The fourth season is broadcast every Sunday evening at 20:00, on KTV.
