= Džemijet =

Džemijet Xhemijet
- Chairman: Nexhip Draga; Ferhat Draga
- Founded: 1918
- Banned: 1925
- Ideology: Islamism; Social conservatism Albanian nationalism Balkan Turks interests Muslim interests National conservatism
- Political position: Right-wing to far-right

Džemijet (Turkish: Cemiyet, "Society", Albanian: Xhemijet; full Turkish name Turkish: İslam Muhafaza-i Hukuk Cemiyeti, "Islamic Association for the Defense of Justice"/"Society for the Preservation of Muslim Rights") was a political party of the Muslim population in the Kingdom of Serbs, Croats, and Slovenes. It represented Albanians, Bosniaks and Turks in what was then "Southern Serbia" (i.e. Vardar Macedonia, Kosovo and Metohija, Sandžak). It was formed in August 1918 and officially constituted in Skopje in late 1919. The party participated in the 1920 and 1923 elections, in which it elected 8 and 14 representatives respectively. In January 1925 the party's leader Ferhat Draga, an Albanian nationalist who had previously served as mayor of Mitrovica, was arrested and soon after the party was disbanded.

== Name ==
The official name of the party was Islam Muhafazai Hukuk Cemiyeti usually translated in English as "Islamic Association for the Defense of Justice" and "Society for the Preservation of Muslim Rights". It was also referred to as the National Turkish Organization Cemiyet (Serbo-Croatian: Narodna turska organizacija Džemijet). It was popularly known by its abbreviated form: Xhemijet or Bashkimi in Albanian, Džemijet in Bosnian and Cemiyet in Turkish.

== History ==
Džemijet's election results in the 1923 parliamentary election by electoral district

Džemijet was founded in Skopje on 18 December 1919 with Nexhip Draga, who had been imprisoned in Belgrade during the Balkan Wars, as leader by Albanians, Bosniaks and Turks of Kosovo, Macedonia and Sandžak and Kenan Ziya from Bitola. Its program, included demands the protection of Muslim rights and the agrarian status of the Muslim landlords. Initially, the party followed a policy of moderation towards Serbian hegemonism within the kingdom and entered a coalition the People's Radical Party in the 1920 elections, in which it elected six deputies through a mixed-ticket and one-candidate system. Prior to the 1923 elections, Nikola Pašić, Prime Minister and leader of the Radical Party, met with the leaders of in Skopje and bargained for their support in exchange for their participation in his government, which became necessary for his party as it after the elections without Džemijet and ethnic German party, no government could be formed. Pašić agreed to legalize Albanian-language schooling, while 1924 Džemijet requested the cancellation of the colonization programmes of Kosovo. As no requirements were met by Pašić, Džemijet voted against the proposed budget by the Radical Party in 1924. The opposition of the budget marked the breakdown of relations between the parties and Džemijet's eventual suppression and illegalization. Ferhat Draga, the new leader of the party, decided that the community's interests would be best represented through the formation of a wider anti-Belgrade opposition front with the Croatian Peasant Party, whose congress he attended in October 1924 for that purpose.

However, his views weren't supported by a minority group that sought continuation of a policy of unconditional compromise with the radical party. In the meantime, another faction that covertly advocated Albanian irredentism in Kosovo and Macedonia emerged. Later in 1924, Pašić sent his strongman Puniša Račić in Kosovo to organize with local Serb officials Džemijet's suppression. In January 1925, Ferhat Draga along and other prominent leaders and journalists of the party's journal were arrested. He was sentenced to twenty years in prison, later released and then arrested and sentenced again to twenty years in prison in 1927. That same year, a leading intellectual of the party Nazim Gafurri, who was outspoken about the electoral abuses in the region, was assassinated.

== Activities ==
In the Albanian-language schools as well as teaching in Albanian were banned and Albanians were allowed only to attend religious Muslim schools or secular Serbian-language ones. While trying to get legal recognition for the opening of Albanian-language schools in the parliament, the party also operated underground secular Albanian schools. After the party's ban, the school system continued with students smuggling Albanian books in Serbian schools and mullahs introducing Albanian secretly during religious courses.

== Elections ==
Year	Popular vote	% of popular vote	Coalition	Overall seats won	Seat change
1920	30,029	1.87%	—	8 / 419	▲8
1923	71,453	3.28%	—	14 / 315	▲6
1925	12,468	0.51%	—	0 / 315	▼14

== See also ==
- Gajret
