= Enver Petrovci =

Kosovar actor and writer (1954–2025)

- Born: 28 February 1954; Pristina, FPR Yugoslavia
- Died: 22 September 2025 (aged 71); Pristina, Kosovo
- Occupation: Actor
- Years active: 1975–2025

Enver Petrovci (28 February 1954 – 22 September 2025) was a Yugoslav and Kosovar actor, writer and director.

== Life and career ==
Petrovci was born on 28 February 1954. He went to high school in Pristina and completed acting school in Belgrade.

He played Hamlet, Macbeth, Julius Caesar and other famous Shakespearean characters. He was one of the founders of the Dodona Theatre and the Acting School in Prishtina.

Petrovci provided the voice of Mufasa in the Albanian dub of The Lion King franchise.

Petrovci died on 22 September 2025, at the age of 71.

== Filmography ==
- Babai (2015) as Adem
- O sa mirë (2013) as Gazmend Berisha (TV series)
- Top je bio vreo (2011) (post-production) as Sakib
- The War Is Over (2010) as Principal Milić
- Gomaret e kufirit (2009) as Border Police Commander
- Sekretet (2008) as Mero
- Anatema (2006) as Col. Lilić
- Lost Son (2005) (short movie)
- 10 Minuta (2004) (short movie) by Burim Haliti
- Black Flowers (2003) as Nan Golemi
- Gorski vijenac (2000) (TV movie) as Skender Aga
- Three Palms for Two Punks and a Babe (1998) as Skočajić
- The Hornet (1998) as Salih
- Nekrologji (1994)
- Laksi slucaj smrti (1993) (TV movie) as Relja's father
- Bulevar revolucije (1992)
- Prokleta je Amerika (1992) as Pantić (segment from "Sangarepo, ti ne rastes lepo")
- Bolji život (1991) (TV series) as Florijan Trajković
- Krug (1991) (short)
- Djelidba (1991) (TV movie)
- Holiday in Sarajevo (1991)
- Sex-partijski neprijatelj (1990) br. 1 as Drndač
- Silent Gunpowder (1990) as Uroš
- Narodni poslanik (1990) (TV movie)
- Sekulic (1990) - Police official
- Stanica obicnih vozova (1990)
- East of East (1990) (as Enver Petrović)
- Migjeni (1990) (TV movie) as Albanian writer Millosh Gjergj Nikolla alias Migjeni
- Specijalna redakcija (1989-1990) (TV series) as Bekteši
- Hajde da se volimo 2 (1989) as Omer
- Forbidden Sun (1989) as Lt. Ionnides
- Obicna prica (1989) (TV movie)
- Sargarepo ti ne rastes lepo (1989) (TV movie)
- Manifesto (1988) as The King
- Ortaci (1988) as John Smith Fitzgerald Petrovci
- The Bizarre Country (1988) as the New Police Chief
- A Film with No Name (1988) as inspector
- Decji bic (1988) (TV movie) as Rade Pajic 'Pera'
- Rojet e mjegulles (1988)
- Uvek spremne zene (1987) as Raša
- Zivot u grobljanskoj (1987) (TV movie) as Marković (prison educator)
- Jugovizija (1986) (TV movie) as Host
- Vrenje (1986) (TV movie)
- Rade Vujovic (1985) as Liht
- Dvostruki udar (1985) (TV movie)
- Opasni trag (1984) as Cemail
- Lazar (1984)
- Stepenice za nebo (1983) as Predrag Vučković
- Krojaci dzinsa (1982) (TV movie)
- Sedam sekretara SKOJ-a (1981) (TV series) as
- Josip Kolumbo
    - Episode #1.6 (1981) ... Josip Kolumbo
    - Episode #1.4 (1981) ... Josip Kolumbo
    - Episode #1.3 (1981) ... Josip Kolumbo
    - Episode #1.2 (1981) ... Josip Kolumbo
- Kur pranvera vonohet (1980) (TV mini-series)
- Kur pranvera vonohet (1979) (Movie)
- Jutarnji disk dzokej (1979) (TV movie)
- Slom (1979) (TV series) as Slobodan Dimitrijevic
- Ti medjutim stojis na velikoj reci (1979) (TV movie)
