= Ferhat Bey Draga =

Kosovo Albanian politician

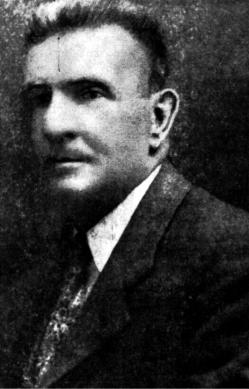
- Born: 1880; Mitrovica, Ottoman Empire (modern Kosovo)
- Died: 2 December 1944 (aged 63–64); Kralan,Gjakova, Yugoslavia (modern Kosovo)
- Other name: Ferhat Draga
- Occupation: Politician
- Known for: Džemijet Party
- Parent: Ali Pasha Draga (Father)
- Relatives: Nexhip Draga (Brother)

Ferhat Bey Draga (1880–1944) was a noted Kosovo Albanian politician during the Balkan Wars and World War I and Axis collaborator during World War II.

== Biography ==
Ferhat Draga was born in Kosovska Mitrovica, Ottoman Empire. He was the brother of Nexhip Draga, another politician mostly known as co-founder of the Džemijet party. Ferhat was educated in Istanbul, where he was active together with his brother Nexhip in the movement for the Albanian writings and schools. He supported the Latin script for writing the Albanian language. During the Young Turk Revolution, Galib Bey managed to get Albanian leaders Ferhat Draga, Nexhip Draga and Bajram Curri to attend a meeting at Firzovik (modern Ferizaj) and use their influence to sway the crowd through fears of "foreign intervention" to support constitutional restoration.
He participated in the Congress of Trieste from 27 February to 6 March 1913, where Albanian and Aromanian delegates from all Albanian territories approved a program regarding the Albanian future Sovereign, borders, and economical-political independence of the Albanian state.
During World War I, he cooperated with Austro-Hungarian forces, which controlled most of Kosovo. In 1915, he raised around 1,000 volunteers to assist the Austrians on the Eastern Front. In 1915, he became an important figure inside Džemijet, and after the death of his brother Nexhip in 1921 he became leader. The party won 14 seats in the elections of 1923. In January 1925, the Dzemijet party came to conflict with the People's Radical Party of Nikola Pašić, and several Albanian leaders including Ferhat Draga were arrested and imprisoned. On the eve of the general elections of the same month he was sentenced to 20 years in prison. He was however released soon and invited to Belgrade to reach a deal with Pašić, unsuccessfully.
In 1927, in the eve of next general elections, he was arrested again and sentenced to another 20 years. Draga still avoided the imprisonment. In the 1930s, he was active with the Muslim Religious Community of the southern Serbia. There he did what he could to oppose the deportation of Albanian Muslims to Turkey. Draga served as well as Mayor of Kosovska Mitrovica.
Ferhat Draga had good relations with King Zog of Albania. In the mid 1930s, he would become the leader of a separatist cell located in Mitrovica and composed as well by Xhafer Deva, Shaban Mustafa, and Mustafa Aliu, all from Mitrovica. The cell was in contact with Ismet Kryeziu and Salih Vuçitërni, both originating in Kosovo and trusted men of Zog inside Albanian politics. Kryeziu and Vuçitërni had enabled other cells from the Albanian side with the goal of reviving the Committee for the National Defence of Kosovo, which had gone into lethargy since the death of Hasan Prishtina and Bajram Curri. Since the Committee former leaders were not a threat for Zog, and the Albanian-Italians relations were stronger, King Zog thought of using the Committee as a leverage in the political endeavors with Yugoslavia. Despite its presence, the committee's work was limited to diplomacy, propaganda, and recruiting, rather than any military activity.
In 1941, Draga welcomed the Italian invasion and the accommodation of most of Kosovo into the Albanian state. Meanwhile, the Germans would consider him unreliable and too Italophile. Involved in fights against the Yugoslav partisans during the Albanian insurgency by the end of World War II, he was wounded and died near Kralan village of Gjakova.

== See also ==
- Ismet Bey Kryeziu
- Serbia in the Balkan Wars
- Albania during the Balkan Wars
