= Isa Blumi =

Czech historian

Isa Blumi (born 1969, in Teplice, Czechoslovakia) is a historian. He is Professor of Asian and Middle Eastern Studies at Stockholm University in Sweden.

== Career ==
During the Kosovo conflict (1998–1999), Blumi was a member of the provisional Kosovo government. After the war, he worked as a consultant for the United Nations Mission in Kosovo (UNMIK) and the Organization for Security and Operation in Europe (OSCE). Blumi completed an MA in Political Theory and Historical Studies at the New School for Social Research in New York, United States. Studying in the History, Middle Eastern and Islamic Studies departments, Blumi graduated with a Ph.D. in 2005 from New York University. His dissertation focused on the complex interactions that Ottoman authorities and inhabitants of Ottoman Albania and Yemen had with each other, with Blumi visiting regional and national archives around the world for his research while he was a Fulbright-Hayes fellow being based in Istanbul. Blumi also had a SSRC-IDRF (Social Science Research Council – International Dissertation Field Research Fellowship) fellowship for his Ph.D. research. Blumi became an assistant professor of Middle Eastern and Balkan history at Georgia State University in Atlanta, USA. During that time he was also a senior research fellow in the Centre for Area Studies at Leipzig University, Germany and a visiting professor of history at the American University of Sharjah, United Arab Emirates where his research focused on regional migration and its impact on host societies.

Blumi has written more than two dozen articles. They cover topics and focus on Ottoman rule in Albania and Yemen, migration patterns of Muslims in the Balkans to Western and Central Europe, south-eastern European history and current affairs, post First World War social history in Kosovo and Albania, the Kosovo crisis, and analysing issues relating to state centralisation and identity. His research interests include Balkan history, Political Islam, the Middle East/Persian Gulf/Red Sea regions and Muslim migration. Blumi has favoured a multi-sited comparative and interdisciplinary approach toward his research that encompasses social history, post-colonial theory and analysis of state institutions as they evolved over time. His research has also entailed a transregional approach examining sociopolitical, cultural and economic exchanges, links and fragmentation in relation to collapsing political systems and the Ottoman Empire, Habsburg Empire and their transnational impacts on the Balkans and Balkan diasporas around the globe. His other areas of research interest have included modern forms of Islam as practiced in the Balkans, Middle East, Eastern Africa and South-East Asia after the Second World War and nineteenth century Asian Muslim Emirates dealing with expanding European commercial interests within the South China Sea.

== Selected works ==
- Blumi, Isa. Destroying Yemen: What Chaos in Arabia Tells Us about the World (Berkeley: University of California Press, 2018)
- Blumi, Isa Ottoman Refugees, 1878–1939: Migration in a Post-Imperial World (London: Bloomsbury Academic, 2013).
- Blumi, Isa and Hakan Yavuz, eds. War & Nationalism: The Balkan Wars (1912–1913) and Socio-Political Implications (Salt Lake City: University of Utah Press, 2013).
- Blumi, Isa. Foundations of Modernity: Human Agency and the Imperial State (New York: Routledge, 2012).
- Blumi, Isa. Reinstating the Ottomans: Alternative Balkan Modernities, 1800–1912 (New York: Palgrave, 2011).
- Blumi, Isa. Chaos in Yemen: Societal Collapse and the New Authoritarianism (New York: Routledge, 2010).
- Blumi, Isa. Rethinking the Late Ottoman Empire: A Comparative Social and Political History of Albania and Yemen, 1878–1918 (New York: Gorgias Press, 2010).

=== Selected articles and book chapters ===
- Blumi, Isa “The Transformation of Islam in Kosovo and its Impact on Albanian Politics,” in Branislav Radeljić and Martina Topić (eds.) Religion in the Post-Yugoslav Political Context (Lexington Press, 2015).
- Blumi, Isa (with Gëzim Krasniqi). "Albanians’ Islam[s]." In Handbook for European Islam, ed. Jocelyne Caesari (New York: Oxford University Press, 2014).
- Blumi, Isa. “An Honorable Break from Besa: Reorienting Violence in the Late Ottoman Mediterranean,” European Journal of Turkish Studies, 18 (2014).
- Blumi, Isa. "Religion and Politics among Albanians of Southeastern Europe." In Religion and Politics in Central and Southeastern Europe: Challenges since 1989, ed. Sabrina P. Ramet (New York: Palgrave, 2013).
- Blumi, Isa. "Not our Kind: Generational Barriers Dividing Postwar Albanian Migrant Communities." In Walls, Borders, Boundaries: Strategies of Surveillance and Survival, eds. Marc Silberman, Karen E. Till and Janet Ward (New York: Berghahn Books, 2012): 155–172.
- Blumi, Isa. "Neither Eastern nor Welcome: The Confused Lives of Berlin’s Balkan Migrants, 1950–2000." In After the Fall: Berlin in Germany and Europe, eds. Marc Silberman, Karen E. Till and Janet Ward (New York: Palgrave-Macmillan, 2011): 183–207.
- Blumi, Isa. "Entangled Trajectories: The Interweaving Interests of the Local and the Evolution of Modern Imperialism in the Balkans." Balkanistica, 24 (2011): 25–58.
- Blumi, Isa. "Adding New Scales of History to the Eastern Mediterranean: Illicit Trade and the Albanian." In Cities of the Mediterranean: From the Ottomans to the Present Day, eds. Meltem Toksoz and Biray Kirli (London: I.B.Tauris, 2010): 116–138.
- Blumi, Isa. "Translating Imperial Failures into Smugglers' Gold: The Boundaries of State in Ottoman Albania and Yemen, 1872–1908." In Boundaries in Depth and in Motion, ed. I. William Zartman (Athens: University of Georgia Press, 2010): 73–100.
- Blumi, Isa. "The Frontier as a Measure of Imperial Power: Local Limits to Empire in Yemen, 1872 to 1914." Proceedings of the British Academy 156 (2009): 289–304.
- Blumi, Isa. “Defining Social Spaces by Way of Deletion: The Untold Story of Albanian Migration in the Post-war Period,” Journal of Ethnic and Migration Studies, 29/6, [November 2003]: 949–965.
- Blumi, Isa. “Contesting the Edges of the Ottoman Empire: Rethinking Ethnic and Sectarian Boundaries in the Malësore, 1878–1912,” International Journal of Middle East Studies, 35/2 [May 2003]: 237–256.
- Blumi, Isa. “The Islamist Challenge in Kosova,” Current History, 101/2 [March 2003]: 124–128.
- Blumi, Isa. “The commodification of otherness and the ethnic unit in the Balkans: How to think about Albanians,” East European Politics and Societies, 12/3 [September 1998]: 527–569.
