= Arben Biba =

Kosovo Albanian actor

- Born: 1976; Pristina, Yugoslavia
- Occupation: Actor
- Years active: 2005–present
- Website: Official Website

Arben Biba (born 1976 in Pristina) is a Kosovo Albanian actor. He is best known for his role as Alban Krasniqi on the Kosovan soap opera Stinë dashurie.

== Filmography ==
=== Film and television ===
Year	Title	Role	Notes
2005	Verhört	Alex	Short film
2008	Hunkeler macht Sachen	Binaku Junior	TV series
2008	Fisherman of the Rhine Falls	Paul	Short film
2010	Urban Odyssey	The stranger	
2012	Jalousie	Klaus Schmidt	Short film
2014	Stinë dashurie	Alban Krasniqi	TV series
2015	Limbus	Soldat 2	Short film
2016	Oboleo	Ben	
2016	Fuck Off	Matthias Böhler	

== See also ==
- List of Albanian actors
