= EAZ =

EAZ may refer to:

- Eastern Air (ICAO code 'EAZ'), an airline based in Zambia
- Education Action Zone, a term used for specially designated areas in England that are considered for special assistance in increasing the quality or availability of educational opportunities, instituted by the New Labour party after 1997
- Endgeräteauswahlziffer (German for 'user device selection digit'), a feature of the obsolete German national ISDN communications protocol FTZ 1 TR 6
- Ethnographisch-Archäologische Zeitschrift, a German academic journal dealing with prehistoric archaeology and ethnology.
