= Salih Gjuka =

Albanian teacher and politician

Salih Gjuka (1876-1925) was an Albanian teacher and activist of the Albanian National Awakening. The first teacher of Albanian in the Ottoman gymnasium of Uskub, in 1912 he became one of the signatories of the Albanian Declaration of Independence and member of the assembly of the Independent Albania as representative of Pejë. During its session held on 4 December 1912 the Assembly of Vlorë elected Gjuka to be a member of the Senate of Albania. In 1913 he served as the head of the education department of the district of Berat, where he died in 1925.
