= Albulena Kryeziu =

Albanian actress from Kosovo (born 1986)

- Born: August 27, 1986 (age 40); Gjakova, SFR Yugoslavia (present day Kosovo)
- Education: University of Pristina, Faculty of Arts (2008)
- Occupation: Actress
- Years active: 2003–present
- Spouse: Ilir Bokshi (m. 2016)
- Children: 1

Albulena Kryeziu (born August 27, 1986) is an Albanian actress from Kosovo. She made her acting debut in 2003 in "Debanti politik" in theater. She's best known for portraying Mimoza Ukaj in the soap opera Stinë dashurie and Tringa Belegu in the sitcom O sa mirë.

== Life and career ==
Albulena Kryeziu was born in Gjakova, Kosovo (then SFR Yugoslavia) on August 27, 1986. She finished high school at Odhise Paskali school of arts in Pejë for acting. In 2008 she graduated from the University of Pristina, Faculty of Arts also for acting, and she's currently earning her master's degree in the same field.

Albulena has played many roles in film and in theatre. She has been part of the Professional Theatre of Gjakova, Dodona Theatre in Pristina, Albanian Theatre in Skopje and in Act Productions. She won the "Best Actress" awards in "Mediterranean Film Festival" in Italy and in DC Festival, France, both in 2016.

In August 2016 she married director Ilir Bokshi. On December 25, 2017, she gave birth to their son, Don Bokshi.

== Film ==
- 2005: Anatema
- 2006: Vaska
- 2006: Tonight Is Cancelled
- 2007: Rikthimi
- 2007: E dehura
- 2009: Si Merlin
- 2009: Shiko botën
- 2009: Darka
- 2010: Këpuca
- 2010: Ashensori
- 2010: Kodi i jetës
- 2010: Sinner’s Pride
- 2010: Turpi
- 2010: Tri dritaret
- 2011: The Wedding Tape
- 2012: Kolona
- 2014: Dear Nita
- 2016: Cheating for Papers

== Television ==
- 2009: Lexi në qytet
- 2009: SpitaliKS
- 2013: O sa mirë
- 2014-15: Stinë dashurie
- 2019-20: iStar

== Theatre ==
- 2003: Debanti politik
- 2004: Lulëkuqet
- 2005: Shi në Uerto Monte
- 2005: Betohem se...
- 2005: Letër nga burgu... letër në burg
- 2005: Lumturizet
- 2006: Sekretet e dashurisë
- 2009: Tregimi zoologjik
- 2010: Vdekja dhe vasha
- 2010: Peer Gynt
- 2019: The 39 Steps
- 2020: Eshtrat që vijnë vonë
- 2020: Allo Allo!

== Music video ==
- 2014: Arsye s'kam by Vali Kuqi

== Awards ==
- Best Actress Award at Mediterranean Film Festival, Italy (2016)
- Best Actress Award at DC Festival, France (2016)
