= Kryeziu family =

Powerful family in the Ottoman Empire

The Kryeziu family was notably powerful and influential in Gjakova and other parts of Dukagjin during the 19th and 20th century. They were part of the Ottoman cast. The family name comes from the Albanian word for "Blackhead".

== Biography ==
Riza Bey Kryeziu was active during the Albanian Revolt of 1912; one of the organizers of the League of Junik and activist of Albanian national movements of the early 20th century. His sons, Gani, Ceno, Hasan, and Said were influential during the early and mid 20th century in southern Kosovo and north Albania. At a short notice, they were able to gather men and logistics for constructing guerrillas.

The Kryeziu brothers were Ceno Bey, Gani Bey, Said Bey, Ali, Rada, and Hasan Bey Kryeziu from the Gjakova region in Kosovo.

Ceno Bey became the brother-in-law of Ahmet Zogu. He was the first widely accepted Yugoslav spy in Albanian political leadership. Due to the pro-Italian orientation of King Zog I, Yugoslav authorities pinpointed Ceno as a near replacement for Ahmet Zogu, who became aware of the connection between Ceno and the Yugoslavs and paid one of his agents to assassinate him in Prague in 1927.

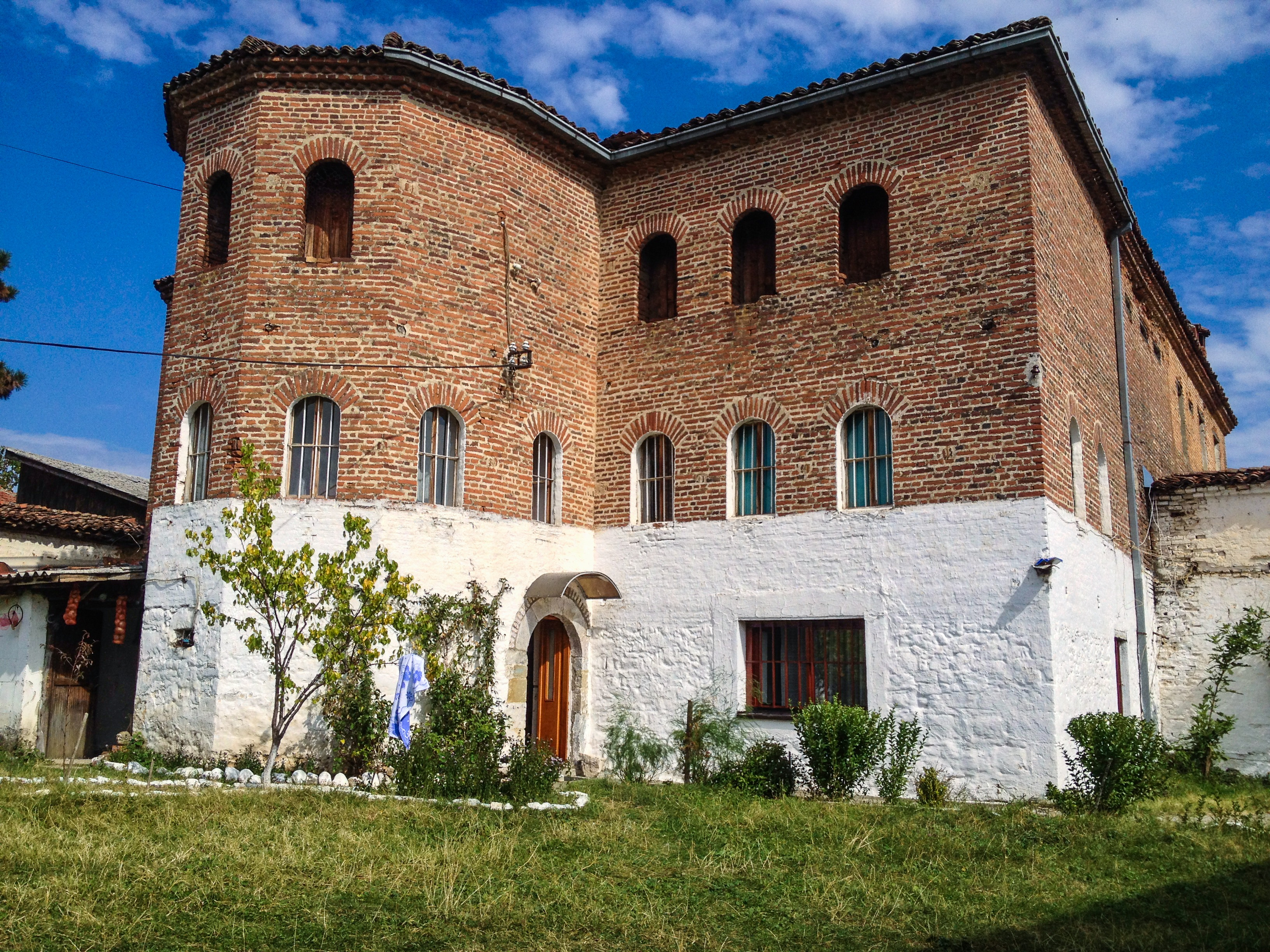
Kulla tower of the Kryeziu Brothers in Gjakova

The other three brothers were less famous than Ceno until World War II, but still respectably influential. They became the leaders of the partisan anti-communist guerrillas in Albania, fighting against the Italians, followed by the Germans, and later the strong communist fraction of the National Liberation Movement. During this time they kept formidable relationships with Yugoslav secret services and Allied Headquarters, collaborating with American and British officers. Enver Hoxha later called them, in disdain, "British and Yugoslav agents".

== See also ==
- Albanian Subversion
- Communism in Albania
