= Said Bey Kryeziu =

Kosovo Albanian anti-communist resistance fighter (1911-1993)

Said Bey Kryeziu (10 April 1911 – 16 May 1993), also known as Seit Bey or Seit Beg, was a Kosovo Albanian anti-communist resistance fighter.

== Biography ==
Said Bey was born in Gjakova, Vilayet of Kosovo, Ottoman Empire (modern Kosovo). He was a member of the influential Kryeziu family. His father, Riza Bey Kryeziu, was one of the activists of Albanian national movements during the early 20th century.

In 1933 he went to Paris, where he studied diplomacy for a short time. He returned from France and resided in Belgrade from 1939 to 1941, where he was supervised by the Yugoslav authorities and helped Albanians to go back and fight against the Italians. In 1941, after trying to launch an uprising in Albania, he was arrested together with his two brothers, Hasan and Gani, and imprisoned in Italy. He was released in September 1943, and made it back to Kosovo where he came into contact with other anti-communist resistance fighters such as Llazar Fundo. During all this time he was in contact with British intelligence, in particular with Julian Amery.

He was captured by the Albanian partisans, but he was released through the intervention of Allied Headquarters in Bari. He then fled to Greece and reached Rome in November 1944.

Said was one of the co-founders, on 26 August 1949, of the "Free Albania" National Committee in Paris, led by Mit'hat Frashëri, a parallel anti-communist government in exile. The committee ceased effectively functioning in 1955, after Albania joined the United Nations. Said moved to New York City in 1959 where he worked as a bank clerk, and he died there in 1993.

== See also ==
- Communism in Albania
- Albanian Subversion
- Albanian Americans
- Kryeziu Brothers
