= Clirim Kryeziu =

Albanian-Swiss footballer (born 1989)

Çlirim Kryeziu
Personal information
- Full name: Çlirim Kryeziu
- Date of birth: 15 February 1989 (age 37)
- Place of birth: Albania
- Height: 1.89 m (6 ft 2 1/2 in)
- Position: Midfielder

Youth career
- 2006–2008: FC Winterthur

Senior career*
Years	Team	Apps	(Gls)
2008–2009	Kreuzlingen	25	(0)
2009–2010	APEP Pitsilia	17	(1)
2010–2013	United Zürich		
2013–2015	Sirnach	9	(1)
2016–2017	United Zürich		
2017–2018	Kosova		
- * Club domestic league appearances and goals as of 30 September 2009

Çlirim Kryeziu (born 15 February 1989) is a Swiss of Albanian ethnicity retired footballer.
