= Hivzi Sylejmani =

Albanian poet and scholar

- Born: July 5, 1910; Tutin, Kingdom of Serbia
- Died: July 10, 1975 (aged 65); Pristina, FR Yugoslavia
- Citizenship: Yugoslav
- Education: University of Belgrade
- Writing career
- Language: Albanian

Hivzi Sylejmani was a Yugoslav writer of Albanian origin. He also translated his own works into Serbian. The library of the city of Pristina bore his name for a long time and there is still a library bearing his name. He graduated from the madrasa in Skopje and studied mechanical engineering in Belgrade. He was a participant in the National Liberation War of the people of Yugoslavia. He is the first Albanian writer in the former Yugoslavia to have his collected works published. In addition, he wrote fairy tales.
