= Riza Bey Gjakova =

Albanian nationalist figure and military commander

Riza Kryeziu (1847-1917), known as Riza Bey Gjakova (Albanian: Riza bej Gjakova, Turkish: Yakovalı Rıza Bey), was an Albanian nationalist figure and guerrilla fighter, an influential bey in the Gjakova region, then part of the Vilayet of Kosovo, Ottoman Empire, and one of the activists of Albanian national movements of early 20th century.

== Life ==
Riza Bey was a member of the League of Prizren. According to Ekrem Vlora's memories, Riza Bey was the involved in the Attack against Mehmed Ali Pasha, performed by the Gjakova Committee of the League of Prizren, which resulted in the assassination of Abdullah Pasha Dreni-Kyeziu (his distant cousin), and Marshal Mehmed Ali Pasha. The Ottoman marshal had been sent to overview the cession of Plav-Gusinje to the Principality of Montenegro, which had caused the ensuing Battle of Novšiće. On September 5, 1878, Riza Bey approached the house of Abdullah Pasha and gave him a 24-hour ultimatum to leave the area and get back to Istanbul. The other part refused, and the next day the Gjakova Committee Albanians attacked and killed Mehmed Ali Pasha, Abdullah Pasha, as well as 20 of his house members. Riza Bey would be later arrested and exiled for 12 years in Sinop, northern edge of the Turkish side of the Black Sea coast. Between 1885 and 1886, he got into a feud with Bajram Curri that lasted for a decade and was only ended through an envoy sent by the sultan who conferred upon each man a military command and rank with Riza Bey becoming a major of the gendarmerie in Shkodër. To govern, Sultan Abdulhamid II used patronage networks by awarding privileges and government positions to co opt local leaders such as Riza Bey into the Ottoman system.

In November 1897, a rebellion led by Riza Bey and Haxhi Zeka occurred in Kosovo aiming to reduce taxes and for the allowance of Albanian schools. The uprising lasted until January 1898 when Riza was invited to Istanbul to discuss terms.

In 1912, due to the deteriorating situation between Albanians and Ottoman authorities, Riza Bey alongside other Albanian leaders were present at a meeting in Junik on 20 May where a besa (pledge) was given to wage war on the Young Turk government. Riza Bey was a guerrilla leader during the Albanian Revolt of 1912, and was one of the main figures of the League of Junik. During the 1912 uprising, while waiting for an Ottoman response to the demands of the rebels, Riza Bey and other leaders of the rebellion ordered their forces to advance toward Üsküb (modern Skopje) which was captured during August 12–15. On August 18, the moderate faction led by Prishtina managed to convince Riza Bey, and other leaders Idriz Seferi, Bajram Curri and Isa Boletini of the conservative group to accept the agreement with the Ottomans for Albanian sociopolitical and cultural rights.

Riza was the father of Ceno Bey, Gani Bey, Said Bey, Ali, Rada, and Hasan Bey Kryeziu. Hasan Prishtina, in his memoirs of 1921, mentions him as a "religious fanatic" who was obsessed with the idea of liberating Sultan Hamid from prison. Riza Bey died in Shkodra in 1917.

== See also ==
- Kryeziu Brothers
