= Ceno Kryeziu =

Albanian politician

Ceno Kryeziu Bej
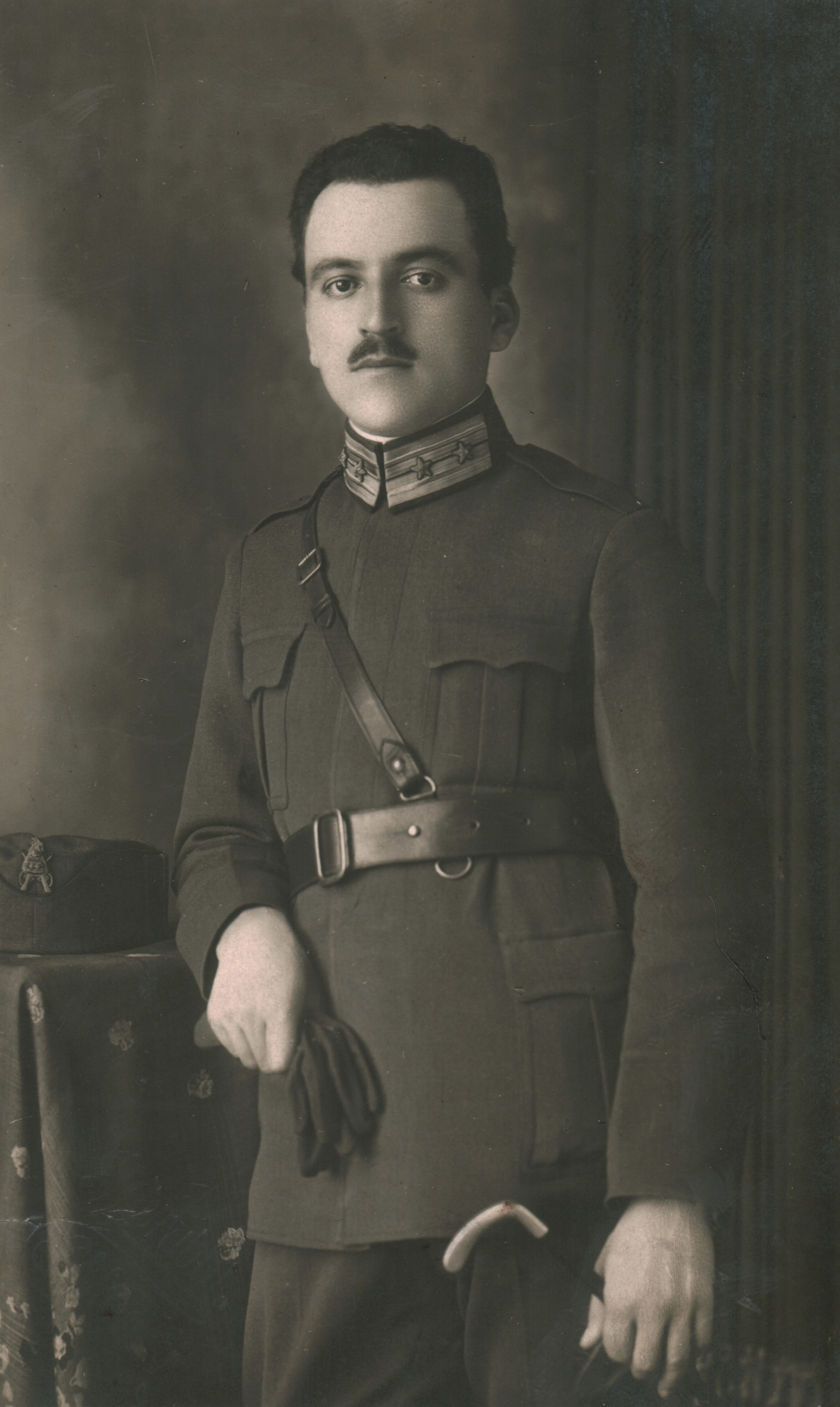

Minister of Interior
- In office 1 February 1925 – 23 September 1925
- Prime Minister: Ahmet Zogu
- Preceded by: Ahmet Zogu
- Succeeded by: Musa Juka

Personal details
- Born: June 23, 1895 Gjakova, Kosovo vilayet
- Died: October 14, 1927 (32 years old) Prague, Czechoslovakia
- Cause of death: Assassinated
- Spouse: Princess Nafije Zogu
- Children: Tati, Prince of Kosovo
- Parent: Riza Bey Kryeziu (father)

Ceno Kryeziu (June 23, 1895 – October 14, 1927), also known as Ceno beg (Bey) Jakova, was an Albanian political figure of the 1910s, 1920s. He was a member of the notable Kryeziu family from Gjakova, known to be trusted by Yugoslav authorities inside Albanian political circles.

== Biography ==
Ceno Kryeziu was the son of Riza Bey Kryeziu, a well known leader in the Gjakova region and activist of Albanian national movements of the early 20th century. During the First Balkan War, Ceno fought against Montenegrins, collaborated with Esat Toptani, and was vice prefect in Kruma. In 1915 he was arrested by the Austrians and imprisoned. He would later serve as a mayor in Gjakova due to an excellent relationship with Yugoslav authorities, not in synchrony with the most other Kosovo Albanians. Things would change in 1922, when he married Nafije, sister of Ahmed Zogu, later to be proclaimed Zog I, King of Albania. During the June Revolution he left Albania. A special court in Tirana sentenced him to death on December 12, 1924, in absentia together with many other political figures. It was later converted to a life sentence. Kryeziu assisted Ahmed Zogu and others in their escape to Yugoslavia, and established connections between Zog and the Yugoslav side. He proved useful for Ahmet Zogu due to his membership in Nikola Pašić's Radical Party and having a good relationship with Ljubomir Davidović. After the return of Zog in Albania, he was given the rank of colonel and put in charge of the Albanian army stationary in Shkodër, where he showed extreme diligence in persecuting and eliminating members of the former Democratic Opposition and people who contributed in the June Revolution. During this time he was a regular informant to the Yugoslav secret services. Kryeziu was directly responsible for the assassination of Asllan Curri, Zija Dibra, and the Montenegrin nationalist and anti-Yugoslav Marko Raspopović. He is mentioned in the newspaper "Ora e Shqypnisë", having allegedly stated to the Yugoslavs: "You see, I kept my promise. I have captured and killed your enemy Marko Raspopović. I got rid of Gurakuqi, Curri, Dibra, for the sake of our peace and yours". In late 1925, he was elected Minister of Interior, resulting in him giving up Yugoslav citizenship. In 1925, after his relations with the Yugoslavs were exposed due to the confrontation with the special emissary of Nikola Pašić in Tirana, Branko Lazarević, Zog suspected that he might be involved in a plot against him and exiled him to France. Zog however later called him back and delegated him as Ambassador to Belgrade − he presented his credentials in October 1926. There were rumors circulating about Yugoslavs having elected him as the most trusted man to replace Zog in Albania, due to Zog's affiliation with Italy and distancing from his Yugoslav support.

== Assassination ==
On July 26, 1927, Kryeziu was selected Ambassador of Albania to Czechoslovakia. He went to Prague in October of that year. On October 14 he was shot after coming out of a restaurant, Café Passage. The assailant was an Albanian student residing in Prague, Alkibijad Bebi (Albanian: Alqiviadh Bebi), born in Elbasan. Alqiviadh Bebi had been following Ceno Beg in Belgrade. He had even been stopped by Yugoslav police but released in absence of conclusive evidence. After shooting Kryeziu, Bebi stayed calm and surrendered to the local police. It is still not completely clear who was responsible for the assassination's plan. Many hypothetical suggestions have been made, including Kryeziu blood feuds, or rival clans, and most likely the Italians, who feared the Yugoslavs strengthening their influence over Albania.

King Zog, who ruled Albania, publicly showed that Ceno's death had caused him sadness and despair. During his police interview, Bebi testified: "I killed Ceno Bey, because he is a Serbophile, and was trying to sell Albania to Yugoslavia". Bebi was killed during his proceedings inside a courtroom by Yugoslav agent Zijah Vushtria. Vushtria was a Kosovo Albanian, and allegedly a former bodyguard of Kryeziu. He was arrested but released soon after with an intervention from Yugoslav authorities.

== Legacy ==
Ceno Bey was the father of Tati Kryeziu, who, for a short period, was the successor of the Royal crown, until the birth of Leka I in 1939.

== See also ==
- Albania–Serbia relations
- Foreign relations of Albania
- Kingdom of Albania (1928–39)
- Kryeziu Brothers
