= Ismail Fazıl Pasha =

Turkish politician

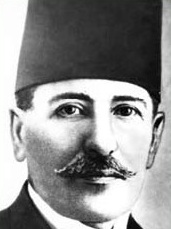
- Born: 1856; Istanbul, Ottoman Empire
- Died: 18 April 1921 (aged 64–65); Ankara, Ottoman Empire
- Burial place: Hacı Bayram Dergâhı
- Military career
- Allegiance: Ottoman Empire
- Service years: 1873 – 6 February 1914
- Rank: Lieutenant general
- Commands: Chief aide-de-camp of Abdul Hamid II, 14th Refif Division, Sixth Regular Inspectorate, VII Corps, Izmir General Forces, Cavalry Department of the War Ministry
- Conflicts: Balkan Wars
- Other work: Governor of Syria Vilayet; Member of Chamber of Deputies (Yozgat); Member of the GNAT (Cebel-i Bereket); Minister of Public Works

Ismail Fazıl Pasha (Turkish: İsmail Fazıl Paşa; 1856 – 18 April 1921), the son of Mustafa Fazl Pasha was an Ottoman general. He was commander of the Ottoman Army, a politician, statesman of the Ottoman Empire and the government of the Grand National Assembly of Turkey. He married Zekiye Hatice Hanim, who was daughter of Mehmed Ali Pasha. They had two sons, Ali Fuat Cebesoy and Mehmet Ali Cebesoy.
