= Nexhip Draga =

Albanian politician and activist involved in the Albanian National Awakening

Bey Nexhip Draga
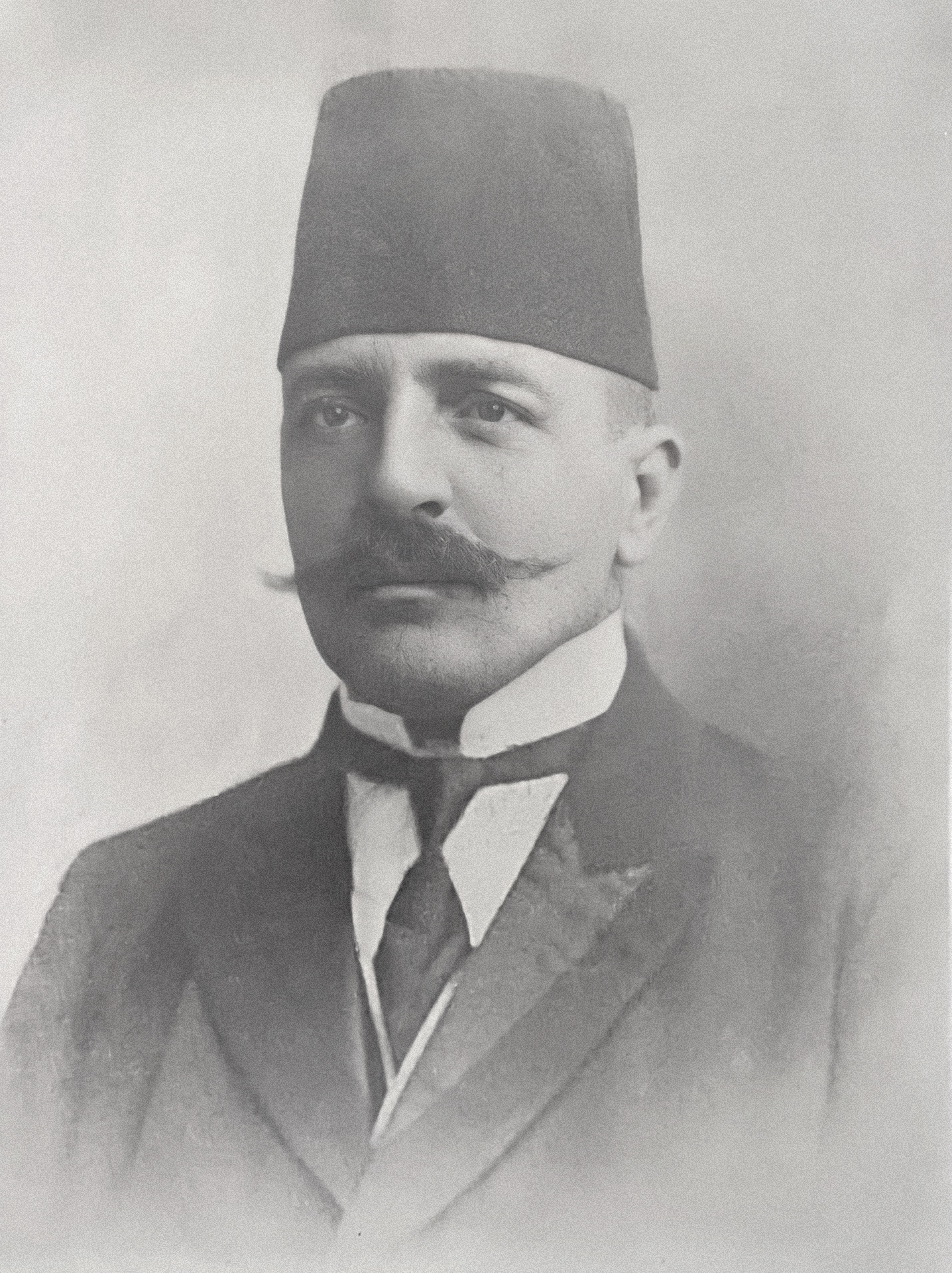
- Photographic portrait of Nexhip Draga

Member of the Chamber of Deputies
- In office 23 December 1908 – 17 January 1912
- Sultan: Abdul Hamid II (r. 1876–1909); Mehmed V (r. 1909–1918)
- Constituency: Sanjak of Üsküp

Personal details
- Born: 1867 Mitrovicë, Ottoman Empire (modern Kosovo)
- Died: 1920 Vienna, Austria
- Party: CUP (until 1910)
- Relations: Ferhat Draga (Brother)
- Parent: Ali Pasha Draga (Father)
- Occupation: Politician

Mehmet Nexhip bej Draga (Turkish: Mehmet Necip bey Draga; 1867–1920) was an Albanian politician who was an important figure of the Albanian National Awakening.

== Biography ==
Nexhip Draga was born in 1867 in Mitrovica (now Kosovo) then a town of the Ottoman Empire. His brother was Ferhat Draga and their father was Ali Pasha Draga, a notable local of Mitrovica who owned lands in the Sanjak of Novi Pazar. He finished his elementary studies in his home town before going to Constantinople (Istanbul), where he studied at an idadiye school and the Mekteb-i Mülkiye (modern Ankara University). While in Istanbul Draga was recruited as one of the first members of the Committee of Union and Progress (CUP) by its founder and fellow Albanian Ibrahim Temo. During his lifetime Draga was well educated and had a reputation of being a cultured man. Apart from Albanian Draga spoke and wrote French, Ottoman Turkish, Serbian and Bulgarian. He owned large landholdings in the Mitrovica area and in the town had a modern German manufactured steam powered sawmill.

He completed his administrative studies in Üsküp (Skopje), Monastir Province. From 1896 to 1902 he was kaymakam (sub-governor) at Kratovo, Yeni Pazar (Novi Pazar) and Köprülü (Veles). Draga was one of the leaders of the Committee of Union and Progress in Üsküp. He had been approached by one of the Young Turk organisations The Ottoman Freedom Society to establish in Üsküp a local branch. Draga at his house along with Adjutant-Major Cafer Tayyar (Eğilmez), Colonel Galib (Pasinler) Bey, Süreyya Bey, a clerk of the Üsküp court, Islam Bey, a tax office director and Mazhar Bey the general secretary to the governor's office founded a local CUP branch. The Üsküp CUP branch pushed for restoration of the Ottoman constitution and it became an important centre due to the involvement of many Albanian notables with its membership by April 1908 exceeding 100 people. In Üsküp, Draga was also an influential figure of the Albanian club (founded 1908).

During the Young Turk Revolution (1908), Galib Bey managed to get Albanian leaders Nexhip Draga, Ferhat Draga and Bajram Curri to attend a meeting at Firzovik (modern Ferizaj) and use their influence to sway the crowd through fears of "foreign intervention" to support constitutional restoration. Draga's CUP branch played a prominent role in rousing Albanians at the Albanian assembly of Firzovik (1908). The same year, during the Second Constitutional Era of the Ottoman Empire, he was elected deputy for Skopje, Monastir Province. Along with Ismail Qemali, Hasan Prishtina and Shahin Kolonja he was a member of the group of deputies promoting Albanian issues such as the use of a Latin character based Albanian alphabet in the Ottoman parliament and opposing the Young Turks. Toward the end of 1908 Draga and other notables in Kosovo viewed Isa Boletini as a nuisance, threat and loyalist of sultan Abdulhamid II and lobbied the new Young Turk government for his arrest and destruction of his kulla (tower house). Class differences of Draga, a landowner wanting law and order and Boletini, a chieftain preferring maintenance of old privileges and autonomy along with the disagreement in Ferizoviç about the restoration of the constitution resulted in the rift. Unable to convince CUP members in Mitrovica to take action, Draga traveled to Salonika and pleaded his case to the local CUP committee who approved and got the Ottoman government to act against Boletini. On 10 April 1910, Rexhep Bey and others left the CUP due to disagreement and clashes in parliament over the repressive actions that the government and the army were carrying out in Kosovo. Like some educated Albanians with nationalist sentiments of the time, Draga supported the unity of Albanians from different religions under the banner of Skanderbeg and was in favour of government reforms that benefited Albanians.

In 1912, due to the deteriorating situation between Albanians and Ottoman authorities, Draga alongside other Albanian leaders were present at a meeting in Junik on 20 May where a besa (pledge) was given to wage war on the Young Turk government. In 1912 he became a prominent member of the Albanian Revolt of 1912. On 18 August 1912, Draga was part of the moderate faction that managed to convince other leaders of the revolt Idriz Seferi, Curri and Boletini of the conservative group to accept the agreement with the Ottomans for extending Albanian sociopolitical rights and legal autonomy. During the Balkan Wars he was imprisoned in Belgrade by the Kingdom of Serbia and then was released in 1914. In 1920 he formed a political organization named Džemijet and was elected deputy in the Yugoslav parliament along with six other members of his party. He died a few months later in Vienna, Austria, after undergoing an operation for cancer. After Draga's death, the leadership of the party was assumed by his brother Ferhat, under whose leadership the party managed to get fourteen deputies elected in the 1923 elections.
