= Ali Kelmendi =

Albanian communist leader

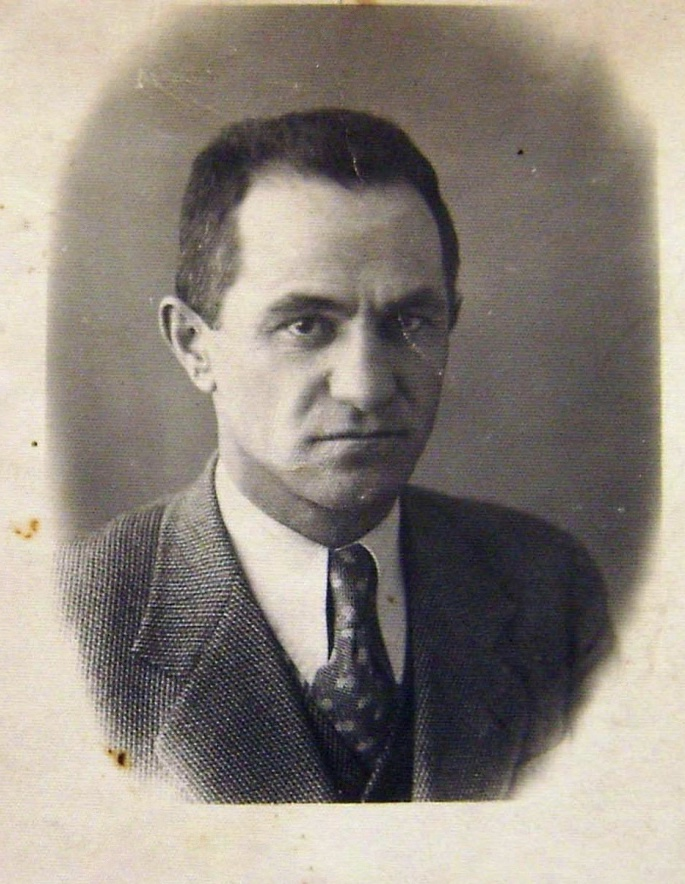
- Born: 3 November 1900; Ipek, Kosovo Vilayet, Ottoman Empire
- Died: 11 February 1939 (aged 38); Paris, France
- Known for: Communist activity Participation in the Spanish Civil War; June Revolution
- Awards: Hero of the People

Ali Kelmendi (3 November 1900 – 11 February 1939) was an Albanian communist, an organizer of the communist movement in Albania and was posthumously a Hero of Albania under the communist government.

== Life and career ==
Ali Kelmendi was born on 3 November 1900 in a poor peasant family in the town of İpek in the Kosovo Vilayet of the Ottoman Empire (in present-day Kosovo), son of Sulejman Kelmendi. In 1920 he fled to Albania after all communist activities were banned in Kingdom of Yugoslavia. There he joined the left-wing political movement "Bashkimi" (English:Unity) of Avni Rustemi, Llazar Fundo, and Fuat Asllani.

In June 1924, he participated in the resurgence led by Fan Noli in Albania as a fighter. After the fall of Noli's regime (December 1924) he emigrated to Brindisi, Italy, thereafter to Austria. Kelmendi joined the anti-Zogist group KONARE (English: Revolutionary National Committee, Albanian: Komiteti Nacional Revolucionar) founded by Noli.

On 8 October 1925 Kelmendi went then to the Soviet Union together with other 13 Albanians based on a study-related invitation from Comintern. He passed one year in the Dzerzhinsky Academy in Leningrad (today's "Grand Duke Mikhail Pavlovich"), and after that he moved to Odessa to work as customs official. There he joined the Albanian communist group affiliated to the Balkan Confederation of Communist Parties belonging to the Communist International.

In 1930, the Communist International sent Kelmendi to Albania as an organizer of the communist movement. He also made some organizational work in Kosovo. However, his work bore no considerable fruit since Marxism hadn't found any favorable soil in Albania and the clandestine work was very difficult because of the activity of the security police. Kelmendi was arrested several times and in 1936 he was exiled. He went shortly back to Russia in March 1932, and after the exile from Albania to Greece and then Moscow. He later server as an intermediary between Comintern and Albanian communist groups. Kelmendi participated in the Spanish Civil War, fighting with the Garibaldi International Brigade.

In 1939, he edited a propagandist newspaper in France together with other Albanian communists. He died in Paris, France, on 11 February 1939 after complications from a stomach surgery, while suffering from tuberculosis.

== See also ==
- History of Albania
