= Riza Dani =

Albanian politician

Riza Dani (1887–1949) was an Albanian politician and activist of the 20th century.

== Biography ==
Dani was born in a Muslim family in Shkodër, at the time part of the Ottoman Empire, son of Hasan and Baftje. His family traced their origin from Gojan in Mirdita region. After finishing the ruzhdije (secondary school) in his hometown in Turkish, he went to study at Istanbul. There he came in contact with the Albanian patriotic circles. In 1912, he participated in the Albanian revolt against the Ottomans.

Together with Ndoc Çoba and Luigj Gurakuqi, he represented Shkodër in the Congress of Durrës of December 1918. From 1921 to 1924 he was elected in the Albanian Parliament. A supporter of Fan Noli, he participated in the June Revolution and was appointed Prefect of Durrës. With the suppression of the Noli's movement and return in power of Ahmet Zogu, he fled Albania, first to Italy, then to Zadar in Yugoslavia and settled in Vienna. There he became part of Noli's revolutionary committee KONARE from its foundation. Meanwhile, a special court in Tirana sentenced him to death for his implications in the June Revolution.

Dani returned to Albania in 1939, after the Italian invasion and the overthrow of Zog's regime. He was involved in the Albanian resistance affiliated with the National Liberation Movement. In October 1943 he was elected chairman of the National Liberation Anti-Fascist Council in Shkodër. In 1945, after the liberation of Albanian and end of World War II, he was elected Chairman of the Executive Committee of the Shkodër District. On 2 December 1945, he was elected representative in the Constitutional Assembly of Albania. According to Enver Hoxha, he opposed from the very beginning many of the proposals and stance that came from Hoxha and his cast. Involved in serious debates with Hoxha and Nako Spiru, he would be pinpointed and placed in the "black list". From the very beginning, he objected the list of the Assembly's Presidium candidates proposed by Kahreman Ylli, submitting an alternative one. Most importantly, he criticized the project-Constitution, as it contained non-democratic elements, and "it spun around a ideological axis, not a national one". Dani was one of the main figures of the so-called "Grupi i deputeteve" (Group of representatives), 17 in total, which would be later arrested, imprisoned, and/or executed. The communists claimed that intelligence reports had placed Dani inside the committee that organized the failed Rebellion of Postribe in September 1945. Dani categorically denied it and said that his participation at that time was simply improbable due to family reasons. The Soviet representative in Albania, Dmitri Chuvakhin, was also not convinced by the allegations presented to him on this matter in a report by Koçi Xoxe. Nevertheless, on 14 May 1947, 10 representatives were arrested, Dani one of them. The court sentenced him to death on 31 December 1947. He was executed two years later.

== See also ==
- Special Court of Albania, 1945
- Albanian Subversion
