= Kol Tromara =

Albanian pharmacist (1882–1945)

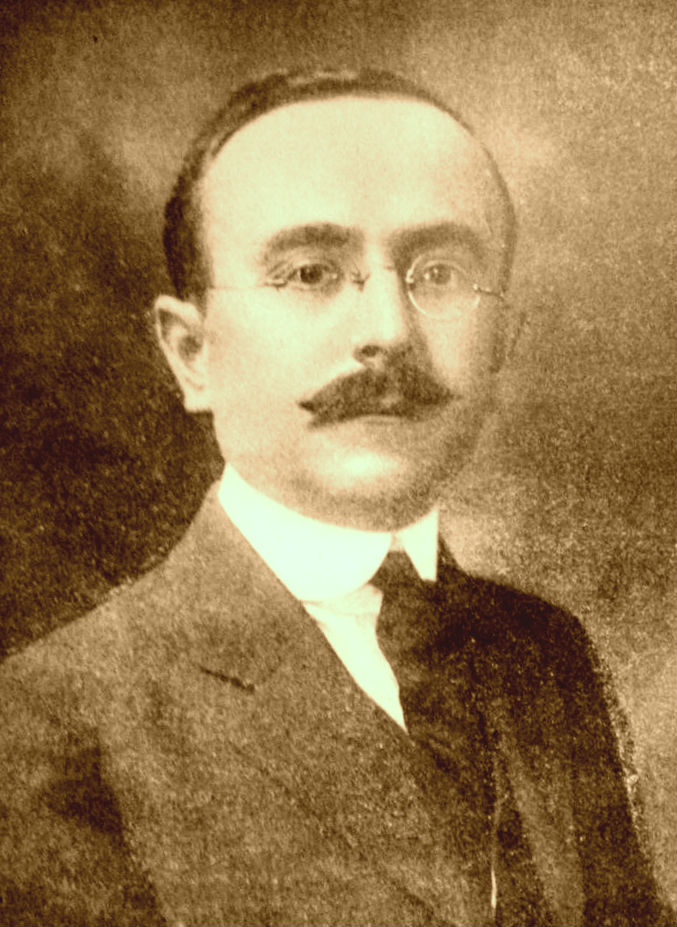
- Born: 1882; Qytezë, Ottoman Empire nowadays Albania
- Died: 1945 (aged 62/63) near Tirana
- Cause of death: Execution by firing squad
- Occupations: Jurist, Pharmacist, government official, politician
- Years active: 1906-1944
- Known for: Chairman of Vatra; Balli Kombëtar

Kol Tromara (1882–1945) was an Albanian nationalist and political figure of the first half of the 20th century.

Tromara was born in Albanian Orthodox Qytezë, a town in today's Devoll municipality, back then part of the Ottoman Empire, son of Thanas and Kostandina Tromara. Tromara pursued his elementary studies in nearby Korçë, and higher ones in Greece. He started working after then as a pharmacist in Korçë, but due to economical difficulties and political oppression from the Ottomans decided to emigrate in US, quite common at the time for the Orthodox community members. Tromara settled in Boston, Massachusetts in 1906 and was immediately involved in the patriotic circles of the Albanian community there. In 1907, he became secretary of the Besa-Besën society in Boston. In 1915, he became General Secretary of Vatra, the Pan-Albanian Federation of America. A year later, he was elected acting chairman of Vatra; in 1917 he co-founded the "Vatra Musical Band", and organized the Congress of Diaspora for raising funds in support of the Vatra's delegation (part of which Tramara was) in the Paris Peace Conference of 1919. Meanwhile, his mother had been executed in his native village by the Greek andarts of Zografos.
In 1920, he returned to Albania where he founded the "Federata e Madhe Atdheu" (Homeland Wide Federation) in Vlorë together with Avni Rustemi, Luigj Gurakuqi, Ahmet Dakli, and Bedri Pejani. In 1923, as Prefect of Gjirokastër Prefecture, Tromara reported constantly on the attempts of the Greek government to exchange the Cham Albanian population and send them to Turkey. Through the sub-prefecture of Chameria which was under his jurisdiction, he tried convincing the Cham population to stay and not leave. Together with Koço Muka he denounced on 27 August 1923 the scenario of the assassination of Enrico Tellini, Italian emissary dealing with Albania-Greece border delimitation, murdered by unknown assailants. He also made an attempt for the electrification of the region, by getting in contact with American companies.
On 27 December 1923 he became member of the Albanian Parliament, representing Korçë. As an active supporter of Fan Noli and the June Revolution, he left Albania in December 1924 when Ahmet Zogu suppressed Noli's movement with the financial and military aid of Kingdom of Yugoslavia and Greece. As many Albanian political emigre members of that time, Tromara settled in Vienna where he joined the "Bashkimi Kombëtar" (National Union) society. Meanwhile, a political court in Albanian sentenced him to 15 years of imprisonment. After the failed assassination attempt on King Zog in 1933, he settled in Paris, still being one of the most active Albanian political emigrants.
With the Italian invasion of Albania in 1939, Tromara returned and became member of the Council of State (Albanian: Këshilli i Shtetit). He was a founding member of the Balli Kombëtar political fraction. During 1942-1943 he served as Prefect of Korçë. In 1943, following his resignation from Balli Kombëtar, he joined the Cabinet of Rexhep Mitrovica as Minister of Culture.
With the end of World War II and the rise of the Communists in power, he was arrested and prosecuted in the Special Court of 1945. The court sentenced him to death on 13 April 1945. Tromara was executed by the Communists in 1945 at the age of 63.

Tromara is the author of an Albanian patriotic song, Sa te rrojë gjithësia (As long as the universe lives), quite known between Albanians though the name of the author was hidden during communism.
