= Kostandin Boshnjaku =

Albanian politician and translator (1888–1953)

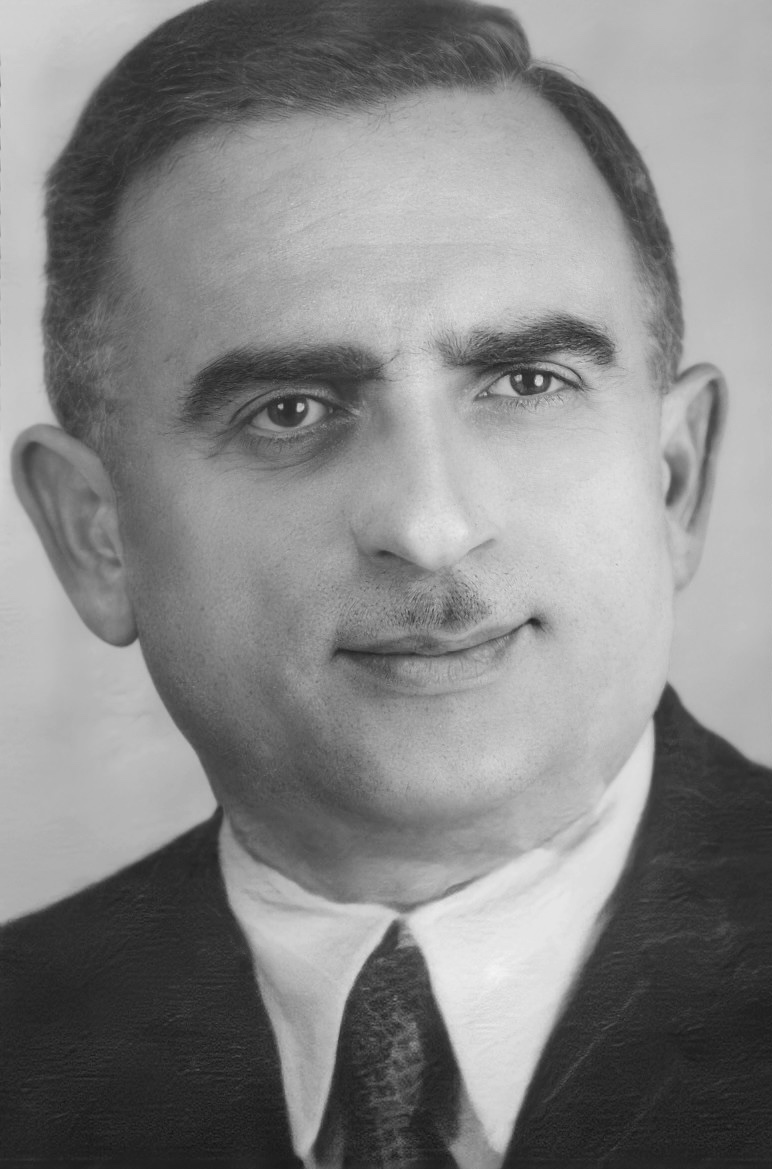
- Born: 20 October 1888; Stegopull, Ottoman Empire (now Gjirokastër, Albania)
- Died: 22 December 1953 (aged 65); Durrës, People's Republic of Albania
- Occupations: Banker, politician, diplomat and translator
- Spouse: Margarete Schmid

Kostandin Boshnjaku (20 October 1888 – 22 December 1953) was an Albanian banker, politician, diplomat and in the last years of his life as a translator of books. Even though he was one of the earliest Albanian communists, he was arrested and convicted on 31 December 1947 by the Supreme Military Court with life imprisonment due to the divergences he had with the communist regime. In 1949, he was released from prison by an amnesty, while unofficially it was said to have been released with the direct intervention of Soviet ambassador Dmitry Chuvakhin. He spent the last years of his live in Durrës serving as a translator of books in several languages.

== Biography ==
=== Early life ===
Kostandin Boshnjaku was born in Stegopull, Lunxhëri region, Ottoman Albania, which is today Gjirokastër County, Albania, in 1888 to an Albanian Orthodox family. His family may have been Albanian Muhaxhirs from the Sandzak region hence his surname, or have Bosniak roots, they may have converted to Orthodox Christianity once arriving to Gjirokastër. He finished his studies in the Commercial Institute of Piraeus, Greece. He was an economist, publisher, and diplomat, as well as a polyglot, knowing (beside his native Albanian in the Tosk dialect) Greek, Old Greek, Russian, Turkish, English, French, and German. He worked for many years in Odessa and St. Peterburg in French and international banks.

=== Early involvement in politics ===
In 1914, the government of Prince Wied put him in charge of the Treasury of the newly created Albanian state. His name appears as co-founder of the Albanian Nationalist Party, Albanian: Partia Nacionaliste Shqiptare, a short-lived party during 1913–1915. All this was interrupted by the Islamic Revolt in Albania, and World War I.

=== Communist ideology and interbellum ===
Kostandin was in Russia during the October Revolution, probably the only Albanian intellectual to have lived the events. During this time, he kept friendship with other Albanian patriots and intellectuals as Fan Noli, Ymer Dishnica, Mirash Ivanaj, Halim Xhelo, Sejfulla Malëshova, Asdreni, Faik Konica, etc. Konica would even suggest later his name to Noli, as the best fit candidate for the role of Ambassador to Greece. He was sent as ambassador to Sofia, Bulgaria (probably with Soviet support) but was recalled back in Albania prior to presenting his letter of credence to Bulgarian authorities; all this would remain an unclear and dubious situation. Boshnjaku brought in Albania the revolutionary ideas of Bolshevism, and people from Comintern were in contact with him for establishing a communist party in the country, though he did not get directly involved in any local communist group. During 1919-20 he widened his range of contacts with liberal and left-wing politicians within the country, and spread the pro-Soviet sentiments. He propagandized the fact that the Soviets prohibited a new partition of Albanian territories by making public the text of the Secret Treaty of London. His effort did not have any big effect on the Albanian masses, which were mostly illiterate, but did influence young politicians and activists, especially the "Bashkimi" (Unity) youth society founded in 1922 and led by Avni Rustemi. By 1923, it was clear that a communist party was far from possible. Comintern sent to Albania Dimitri Pentchev in order to persuade the authorities to set up diplomatic relations with Soviet Union. Therefore, Boshnjaku stopped from his side, but re-assumed his activities on late 1923 after Pentchev left Albania. He was instrumental in passing the resolution of the Albanian National Assembly to honor Lenin, who had recently died, in February 1924. Ali Këlcyra, in his memoirs of 1959, would mention that the pro-soviet and leftist positioning of Noli and many other leaders of the democratic opposition in Albania, would come mostly as a consequence of the propaganda and persuading work of Boshnjaku.

After the June Revolution in 1924, Boshnjaku fled to Austria, leaving Albania together with many other democratic political personalities. According to Sejfi Vllamasi's memories, Boshnjaku served as an intermediary between the newly exiled community and Comintern. With his initiative, they reached an agreement with Comintern which then provide monetary support for Noli's and Boshnjaku's organization KONARE (Revolutionary National Committee) and even for the members of the Committee for the National Defence of Kosovo. King Zog's tribunal condemned him in 1927 with life sentence, in absence. He got arrested in Vienna in 1929, allegedly for implication in the failed murder attempt on Ahmet Zogu. His reputation and connections made possible for him to get released, Fan Noli, Henri Barbusse, even Albert Einstein, were some of the names who ran in his defense.

In 1932, Boshnjaku appears in an Albanian anti-Monarchist committee in Constanța, Romania, together with other Albanian emigre members settled there (see:Albanians in Romania).

=== World War II ===
He returned in Albania in 1939, joining soon the communist side of National Liberation Movement (Albanian: Lëvizja Nacional Çlirimtare or Lëvizja Antifashiste Nacional Çlirimtare, LANÇ). According to Albanian "Nacional" newspaper article of 2011, referring to some extracts from a British Intelligence report on Albanian communist leaders of early post-WWII, Kostandin was openly a pro-German before the war, changing his position only after Germany attacked Soviet Union.

=== Aftermath in Communist Albania ===
After World War II, he was elected a representative in the new Constitutional Assembly which came out of the general elections of December 2, 1945, following with being elected the General Director of the Albanian State Bank. During this time would come the first shuttering of relations with Hoxha and the rest of Hoxha's clan which would strongly weaken his position inside the Communist Party. In May 1945, Joseph Earle Jacobs (1893-1971) as the representative of the US Civil Mission in Albania, would meet with Hoxha who back then was presenting himself simply as General-Colonel. The discussion was upon several topics. One of them was a permission for the United States Department of the Treasury representative Gardner Patterson (1916-1998) to visit Albania as part of his Balkan tour and place contacts with the Central Bank of the country. Another topic was establishing an account at Chase Bank of New York as an intermediary of the Albanian State Bank. This would make possible to the Albanian diaspora to send remittances back home, as the US still did not recognize the government of Albania at the moment. As came out from the discussions, Boshnjaku (back then governor) and Kolë Kuqali (Boshnjaku's deputy) had previously discussed and agreed with Jacobs. Kolë Kuqali would be arrested later together with Boshnjaku, and hang himself in his cell in dubious circumstances.

Another contradiction raised during the attempts to unify the Albanian lek with Yugoslav dinar, and to agree on Yugoslav requests for establishing the Albanian State Bank under the sovereignty of the National Bank of Yugoslavia. Boshnjaku opposed this idea. This time Nako Spiru (1918-1947) shared consequences with him.

Hoxha's dislike over Boshnjaku are visible through how he mentions him in his correspondence of that time. Hoxha simply mentions him as "B." or even ironically calls him "Dear Bosnian Comrade" ("I dashur shok Boshnjak" - in Albanian "Boshnjak" means Bosnian, a national of Bosnia, instead of "I dashur shoku Boshnjaku" - which would mean "Dear Comrade Boshnjaku").

On December 22, 1945, he wrote a memo to Hoxha, criticizing the strong measures of the communist government against private sector. Though he was a supporter of the Agrarian Reform which had recently been completed, Boshnjaku was against any collectivization or accumulation of land as state property.

Without the private sector, meaning without the work of all people, there is no production, neither reconstruction, nor construction, and no progress in our economy.

— Extract from the Memo 1945

This public stance would cost him a lot. In 1947, he was arrested by the communist government, which accused him of implications with Anglo-American intelligence, and giving another life sentence. The arrest and trial went on the same time the so-called "Group of the representatives" (Alb: Grupi i Deputetëve), several opposition members being sentenced, although Boshnjaku was not connected to them. This time, the attempts of amnesty were in vain. After an amnesty in 1949, he came out of prison, still living under surveillance, deprived of any pension or economical help, in total poverty. Kostandin died in 1953.

His name and contribution were annihilated in the People's Socialist Republic of Albania, together with his memo. He was shortly as a "pro-bourgeois and opportunist element, trying to harm the communist economy".

Boshnjaku was rehabilitated after fall of communism in Albania, though he remained enigmatic and unknown to most of the Albanians.

== Family ==
In 1940, Boshnjaku married to Margarete Schmid, an Austrian woman he had met in Vienna. They had lived together since 1925. The couple did not have any children.

== See also ==
- Communism in Albania
- Communist economy
