= Zogist counter–revolution in Albania (1924) =

Coup in Albania

Zogist counter-revolution in Albania
- Part of Interwar period
Date	13–24 December 1924 (11 days)
Location	Principality of Albania
Result	Zogist-Yugoslav victory: Overthrow of Fan Noli's government; Principality abolished and Republic established

Belligerents
Noli’s Government; Kachaks under Hasan Prishtina; Kelmendi tribesmen; Tribesmen from Dibër under Elez Isufi; Chetas from Southern Albania under Riza Cerova	(Albania) Ahmet Zogu‘s forces; Mati tribesmen under Ahmet Zogu; Kingdom of Yugoslavia; (Russia) White Army

Commanders and leaders
(Albania) Fan Noli (surrendered); Elez Isufi †; Hasan Prishtina (Albania) Bajram Curri (Albania) Riza Cerova	(Albania) Ahmet Zogu; Alexander I (Russia) Ilja Miklashevsky

Units involved
Kelmendi and Dibran tribesmen Kachaks; Cheta of Dishnicë; Volunteers from Lushnjë, Skrapari, Përmet and Vlora	Mati tribesmen Royal Yugoslav Army (Russia) White Movement

Strength
(Albania) Unknown	1,000+

The Zogist counter-revolution in Albania was a counter-coup in Albania after the June Revolution, where Fan Noli overthrew Ahmet Zogu‘s Government. After six months, Zogu, along with his Mati tribesmen, Yugoslav forces and White Russian troops, would re-enter Albania to take control of the country.

== Background and June Revolution in Albania ==
The June Uprising was split into two fronts: The Northern Front organized by the Committee of Kosovo and led by Kachak leader Hasan Prishtina which had supported Noli due to the rivalry between them and the government of Zogu, and the southern front which was led by Riza Cerova. The Uprising was strongly supported by Albanian Peasants. The Albanian peasantry appeared diverse. Part of them dreamed of owning a piece of land or expanding the small amount of land they owned. The rest wanted to be freed from heavy and numerous state obligations, such as the tithe, the jalap tax, the slavery tax, and other wastes of the feudal system. The Southern Front was composed of the Përmet Garrison and Volunteers from Skrapar. Following several Skirmishes against the government forces, Riza Cerova leading an armed group of ~120 men would take over Berat and would make his way to Tirana. In Kozare he encountered Osman Gazep who was sent from Tirana with a battalion to suppress the uprising. Following the Battle of Kozare, Cerova would defeat the Government Forces and would occupy Lushnje where he was attacked by Osman's forces again but managed to defeat them. Around this time the Vlora volunteers would arrive to assist the Uprising. With all of the southern forces, the rebels would occupy Tirana as Ahmet Zogu would flee to Yugoslavia. According to US estimates, 20 people were killed and 35 were injured on the northern front, while 6 people were killed and 15 were injured on the southern front.

== Zogist counter-coup ==
In December 1924, Ahmet Zogu launched an invasion from Yugoslav territory to overthrow Fan Noli's government, relying heavily on the support of the Kingdom of Yugoslavia. Believing that Albania was on the verge of embracing Bolshevism due to Noli's diplomatic relations with the Soviet Union, Belgrade actively backed the counter-revolution. To mount the invasion, Belgrade provided Zogu with weapons, Russian White Emigres, and approximately 1,000 regular soldiers from the Yugoslav army.

The first confrontation of the Zogist Invasion occurred in the Peshkopi area, where Noli’s reserve army was headquartered. It resulted in the capture of Peshkopi and Elez Isufi getting wounded, where he eventually died. After capturing Peshkopi and taking a short rest, the same Russian division, along with Ahmet Zogu‘s Mati tribesmen and Yugoslav forces, launched an offensive on the country’s capital, Tirana. Noli’s demoralized troops were only able to put up minimal resistance. By December 24, Zogu’s forces had captured Tirana and Fan Noli had fled from Albania to Italy, along with some of his supporters. After Zogu had retaken Tirana, Zogu restored power in Albania. Although Zogu was initially reliant on Yugoslav political and military support, from 1925 onwards he became increasingly obliged to depend on Italy.

== Aftermath ==
After the counter-coup, Ahmet Zogu and his supporters managed to overthrow Noli's government, making use of the financial and military support from the Kingdom of Yugoslavia. Most of the former democratic opposition fled to Italy, settling later in western Europe, mainly in Vienna. Two organizations were formed there; KONARE and "Bashkimi Kombëtar" (National Union). The second consisted of patriotic-democratic anti-Zogist figures, while KONARE comprised also strong left-wing ideology. Beside being the main anti-Zogist opposition during 1925–30, it showed anti-feudal, anti-imperialist, and pro-Soviet nuances. KONARE managed to retrieve financial support by the Comintern with the intermediation of Kosta Boshnjaku, one of the first Communist emissaries deployed by the soviets in Albania with the task of establishing communist cells, and possibly a Communist Party. In addition to young revolutionary activists, KONARE also attracted the members of the irredentist Committee of Kosovo, who were the sworn enemies of Ahmet Zogu and vice versa. Noli and Boshnjaku managed to procure some financial support for the Committee through Comintern, affiliating them with the Balkan Federation.

== Sources ==
- Banac, Ivo (1988). The National Question in Yugoslavia: Origins, History, Politics. Cornell University Press. ISBN 978-0801494932.
- Ersoy, Ahmet; Górny, Maciej; Kechriotis, Vangelis, eds. (2010). Modernism: Representations of National Culture. Discourses of collective identity in Central and Southeast Europe (1770–1945). Vol. III. Central European University Press. ISBN 9789637326646. OCLC 704274944.
- Fischer, Bernd Jürgen (1999). Albania at War, 1939–1945. Central European studies. West Lafayette, Ind.: Purdue University Press. ISBN 9780585063881. OCLC 42922446.
- Pano, Nicholas (1992). Joseph Held (ed.). The Columbia History of Eastern Europe in the Twentieth Century. New York: Columbia University Press. ISBN 9780231076968. OCLC 24320546.
- Vllamasi, Sejfi; Verli, Marenglen (2000). Ballafaqime Politike në Shqipëri (1897–1942): Kujtime dhe Vlerësime Historike. Tirana: Shtëpia Botuese "Neraida". ISBN 999-2-77-131-3.
