= Bedri Pejani =

Albanian politician (1885–1946)

Bedri Bey Pejani
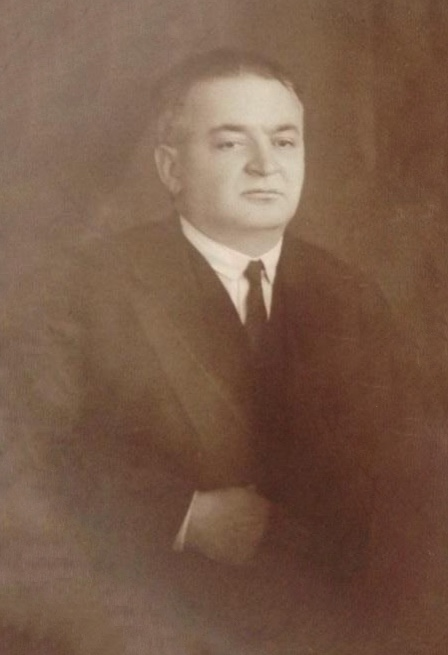

Member of the Chamber of Deputies in the General Assembly of the Ottoman Empire
- In office 23 December 1908 – 17 January 1912
- Sultan: Abdülhamid II; Mehmed V
- Grand Vizier: Kâmil Pasha; Hüseyin Hilmi Pasha; Ahmet Tevfik Pasha; Ibrahim Hakki Pasha; Mehmed Said Pasha
- Constituency: Sanjak of İpek

Personal details
- Born: Bedri Abdi Thaçi; 10 October 1885 Peja, Kosovo Vilayet, Ottoman Empire (now Kosovo)
- Died: 6 July 1946 (aged 60) Prizren, FPR Yugoslavia (now Kosovo)
- Parent: Abdi Thaçi-Pejani (father)
- Occupation: Politician
- Awards: Order of Freedom (Kosovo)

Bedri Pejani (or Bedri bej Ipeku; 10 October 1885 – 6 July 1946) was 20th century Albanian politician. During World War II, he was one of the founders of the Second League of Prizren.

== Biography ==
Pejani was born in the city of Peja in the Kosovo Vilayet of the Ottoman Empire, modern day Kosovo, into an Albanian family on the 10th of October 1885 with the name Bedri Thaçi, son of Abdi Thaçi (Pejani). A family which spoke using the Gheg dialect of the Albanian language. To refer to his family origin he used the last name Pejani (from Peja) as was custom for that period. His family were a part of the Thaçi tribe.

Pejani was active in the Nationalist Movement of Albanians in the Skopje region against the Young Turk administration in 1908. He was condemned to death by the Ottoman military court, and according to Sejfi Vllamasi's memories he passed a psychological shock which would affect him later. He was a delegate at the Congress of Monastir of 1908, and President of the Second Congress of Manastir. At the age of 27 Pejani became a signatory of the Albanian Declaration of Independence. He represented there the regions of Plav, Gusinje, Gjakova, and Peja, and signed under the name "Bedri Pejani". Elected at the first Albanian senate, he represented Kosovo at the Conference of Versailles in 1919.

Pejani was one of the founding members of the Committee for the National Defence of Kosovo, founded in Shkodër in November 1918.

In 1920 he became editor-in-chief of Populli ("The people") after the assassination of Sali Nivica, a newspaper based in Shkodër. During the 1921-1923 period he was head of the People's Party (Albanian: Partia e Popullit) formed by Fan Noli and other liberal-nationalists and member of the Albanian Parliament.

In 1922, after failing to become Minister of the Interior, his relationship with Ahmet Zogu would aggravate. Pejani feared an assassination attempt from Zog's side and had another psychological breakdown. He was sent in a psychiatric hospital in Naples, returning shortly after being recovered.
Pejani was one of the main participants of the June Revolution in 1924, fleeing Albania after the Conservative forces overthrew Noli's government. When Ahmet Zogu came to power, he was condemned again to death in absentia by Zogu's regime, which subsequently amnestied him. Pejani joined KONARE founded by Fan Noli in Vienna. While in exile, Pejani moved up as Head of the Committee for the National Defence of Kosovo, together with Ibrahim Gjakova and Qamil Bala. During this time the committee would receive some financial support from Comintern, same as did KONARE due to Noli's and Kosta Boshnjaku's connections. Pejani was a member of Comintern and kept continuous correspondence with it under the nickname Emoraj.^{[a]}

The Italian Invasion of Albania in April 1939 would find Pejani as part of the Albanian exile community in Paris. Though an old opponent of Zogu, Pejani together with other Albanian activists and French politicians (such as Justin Godart) organized a protest meeting in Paris on April 8, 1939. The meeting strongly opposed the invasion of Albania and called for western democracies to react. He had previously forwarded a memorandum to Neville Chamberlain, British Prime Minister of the time through the French authorities as leader of the Popular Party (French: Parti Populaire) and the Albanian community of France on April 5.

Pejani came back to Albania where he was arrested for anti-fascist and bolshevist activity and imprisoned in Porto-Romano near Durrës. He was released after Italy's capitulation.

During the Nazi Occupation, Mustafa Kruja and Shefqet Vërlaci would encourage him of taking a more active role. Assisted by the German emissary of Nazi Germany, Franz von Schweiger, and along with Xhafer Deva, Pejani created in 1943 the Second League of Prizren in order to protect Greater Albania, which, created in May 1941, was now in danger, because of political vacuum. Pejani's idea was that "the Albanians should be armed, so the end of the war, which was near, didn't find them unprepared and with hands up". In a document sent to the Führer from the position of the President of the Second League of Prizren, he took over to mobilize 120,000 - 150,000 Albanians under Nazi command. The German side would call the numbers "demographically impossible" and Pejani as "abnormal".

In 1946, Pejani was captured by the Albanian partisans and handed over to the Yugoslav side after having confessed in 13 pages his actions and beliefs and handed over to Petro Marko. Due to health issues he was hospitalized in Prizren, where allegedly he was poisoned, and died on July 6, 1946.

== Notes and references ==
Notes:

a.	The archive of Comintern in Moscow was digitalized in 2004 after a long cooperation between International Council on Archives, Federal Archives of Switzerland, and State Archive of the Russian Federation. Stephen Schwartz, Bernhart Bayerlyen, and Shaban Sinani assisted for the transliteration and precising of the Albanian personalities. Material about Pejani found under "Albania: Collection nr. 495, Inventory nr. 188".
