= Llazar Fundo =

Albanian journalist and writer (1899–1944)

Llazar (Zai) Fundo
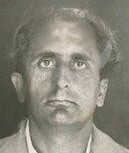
- Born: March 20, 1899; Korçë, Albania (then Ottoman Empire)
- Died: September 20, 1944 (aged 45); Kolesjan, Kukës, Albanian Kingdom

Llazar (Zai) Fundo (March 20, 1899 – September 20, 1944) was an Albanian Communist, later social-democratic journalist and writer. He was a former member of the Comintern and the Balkan Communist Federation. He was associated with the Fan S. Noli government in 1924 and became the leader of the Bashkimi organization after the death of Avni Rustemi in 1924. In 1928 he helped establish the Korçë Communist Group. In the fierce rivalry for power control within the Communist Party, he was branded a Trotskyist and purged from the party.

== Biography ==
Fundo was born in Korçë, Albania to a family originating from Moscopole, of Aromanian origin. He attended the French Lycée of Salonica and later studied law in Paris, France. He was the mentor to other Albanian Communist students in Paris, including future Albanian leader Enver Hoxha, to whom he taught law.

=== Return to Albania in 1924 ===
Upon returning to Albania he was a member of Avni Rustemi's Bashkimi organization which he later took over upon Rustemi's death by assassination in April 1924. Fundo developed connections with Orthodox Bishop Fan S. Noli and played an active role in forcing then-Prime Minister Ahmet Zogu's exile to Yugoslavia that same year. Upon the overthrow of Noli's government in November 1924, Fundo emigrated to Vienna, Austria, becoming member of KONARE thus acquainted with the Balkan Communist Federation, and then emigrated to the Soviet Union where he became a member of the Comintern.

=== Organization of the Korçë Albanian Communist Group ===
In 1929 he took part in the 8th Congress of the Balkan Communist Federation where he discussed the founding of a Communist Party in Albania, having helped establish the Albanian Communist Group in 1928 in Korçë. From 1930 to 1931 he served as a journalist for the Vienna-based magazine The Balkan Federation.

=== 1933-1939: anti-Stalinism and expulsion from Comintern ===
In 1933 while in Germany he was a partial observer of the Reichstag fire events and traveled with Leipzig Trial participant Georgi Dimitrov (whom he befriended) back to Moscow. During the Spanish Civil War he organized Albanian volunteers for the International Brigades. During these years Fundo began criticizing the pro-Stalin wing of the Communist Party of the Soviet Union as "Stalinist", gravitating more towards the views of Leon Trotsky. During the Great Purge he was expelled from the Comintern in 1938 as a "bourgeois deviationist" and a death sentence was announced against him. However, the intercession of Georgi Dimitrov, then leader of the Comintern, resulted in this sentence being dropped.

=== Return to Albania in 1939 ===
Following the Italian invasion of Albania in 1939, Fundo returned to Albania and served as a secondary school teacher in his hometown of Korçë until his dismissal a year later, as he was a participant in the underground struggles against the Italians. By this time he had become disillusioned with Communism and embraced social-democracy. He was subsequently arrested in 1941 and sent to the island of Ventotene. Fundo became acquainted with Altiero Spinelli and Sandro Pertini during this period, the latter urging Fundo to stay and fight with the Italian resistance. As the Fascist government began to fall in 1943 however, Fundo was able to return to Albania.

=== Death in 1944 by Albanian Communists ===
In September 1944 he was captured in southern Yugoslavia, then allegedly handed over by Josip Broz Tito to the guerrillas of the Communist Party of Albania under Enver Hoxha. He was accused of Trotskyism and collaboration with British Intelligence. He was then either lashed or beaten to death. According to Enver Hoxha in his memoirs, however, he was found by the Albanian National Liberation Army in the company of a "gang of bandits" led by anti-communist partisan Kryeziu Brothers and a British officer, an account that has since been substantiated. The Yugoslav partisans, who in 1942 had told their Albanian counterparts to "expose" Fundo, then allegedly came out in Fundo's defense and demanded that Hoxha's army hand Fundo over to them, but by then their letter had arrived too late as Fundo had already been executed.
