= KONARE =

Albanian left-wing political émigré group

Komiteti Nacional Revolucionar
- Abbreviation: KONARE
- Formation: March 25, 1925
- Founder: Fan Noli
- Founded at: Vienna
- Dissolved: mid '30s
- Type: Political
- Purpose: Overthrowing the political regime in Albania
- Key people: Fan Noli; Kostandin Boshnjaku
- Main organ: Liria Kombëtare (National Freedom)

KONARE or Komiteti Nacional Revolucionar (Revolutionary National Committee) was a left-wing revolutionary committee of the Albanian political émigrés in Europe, from 1925 till mid-30s. Its central political figure was Bishop Fan Noli.

After the June Revolution, Ahmet Zogu and his supporters managed to overthrow Noli's government, making also use of the financials and military support from Kingdom of Yugoslavia and Greece. Most of the former democratic opposition fled to Italy, settling later in the western Europe, mainly in Vienna. Two organizations were formed there; KONARE and "Bashkimi Kombëtar" (National Union). The second consisted of patriotic-democratic anti-Zogist figures, while KONARE comprised also strong left-wing ideology. Beside being the main anti-Zogist opposition during 1925–30, it showed was anti-feudal, anti-imperialist, and pro-Soviet nuances. KONARE managed to retrieve financial support by the COMINTERN with the intermediation of Kosta Boshnjaku, one of the first Communist emissaries deployed by the soviets in Albania with the task of establishing communist cells, and possibly a Communist Party. In addition to young revolutionary activists, KONARE also attracted the members of the irredentist Committee of Kosovo, who were the sworn enemies of Ahmet Zogu and vice versa. Noli and Boshnjaku managed to procure some financial support for the Committee through Comintern, affiliating them with the Balkan Federation.
According to Sejfi Vllamasi's memoirs, the founder of KONARE beside Fan Noli were: Qazim Koculi, Mustafa Kruja, Riza Dani, and Xhevat Korça from the former "Krahu Kombëtar" political fraction of the Albanian Parliament, other civilians and officers as Kol Tromara, Qazim Kokoshi, Llano Borshi, Major Shefqet Korça, captains Aziz Çami and Riza Cerova; and most of the youth members of "Bashkimi" (The Union) - a former political group founded by Avni Rustemi, such as Halim Xhelo, Sejfulla Malëshova, Llazar Fundo, Qamil Çela, Demir Godelli, Selim Shpuza, Haki Stërmilli, Reshat Këlliçi, etc.
The main press organ of KONARE was Liria Kombëtare (National Freedom). Early revolutionary figures like Halim Xhelo and Riza Cerova would crystallize their political persona through this newspaper. In April 1927, KONARE changed the name to Komiteti i Çlirimit Kombëtar (National Liberation Committee). By 1928, it came de facto under the control of Comintern; 24 young Albanians were sent to Moscow to follow their studies in high-end Soviet institutions.

Despite the efforts, the committee did not pose any real threats to Zogu's regime, who from his side was elected President of Albania in 1925 (thus ending the era of the Principality of Albania), while on 1 September 1928 became Zog I, King of Albania, establishing a constitutional monarchy.
Disappointed by the political overturns, Noli decided to retire from political life and move back to the US. This would start the end of the committee, which would practically cease by mid 1930s. Many of its political figures moved into the parallel "National Union" organization which would continue to oppose the Zogu's regime in Albania, culminating with the assassination attempt of 1931.

== Sources ==
- Banac, Ivo (1988). The National Question in Yugoslavia: Origins, History, Politics. Cornell University Press. ISBN 978-0801494932.
- Ersoy, Ahmet; Górny, Maciej; Kechriotis, Vangelis, eds. (2010). Modernism: Representations of National Culture. Discourses of collective identity in Central and Southeast Europe (1770–1945). Vol. III. Central European University Press. ISBN 9789637326646. OCLC 704274944.
- Fischer, Bernd Jürgen (1999). Albania at War, 1939–1945. Central European studies. West Lafayette, Ind.: Purdue University Press. ISBN 9780585063881. OCLC 42922446.
- Pano, Nicholas (1992). Joseph Held (ed.). The Columbia History of Eastern Europe in the Twentieth Century. New York: Columbia University Press. ISBN 9780231076968. OCLC 24320546.
- Vllamasi, Sejfi; Verli, Marenglen (2000). Ballafaqime Politike në Shqipëri (1897–1942): Kujtime dhe Vlerësime Historike. Tirana: Shtëpia Botuese "Neraida". ISBN 999-2-77-131-3.
