= Sejfulla Malëshova =

Albanian politician and writer

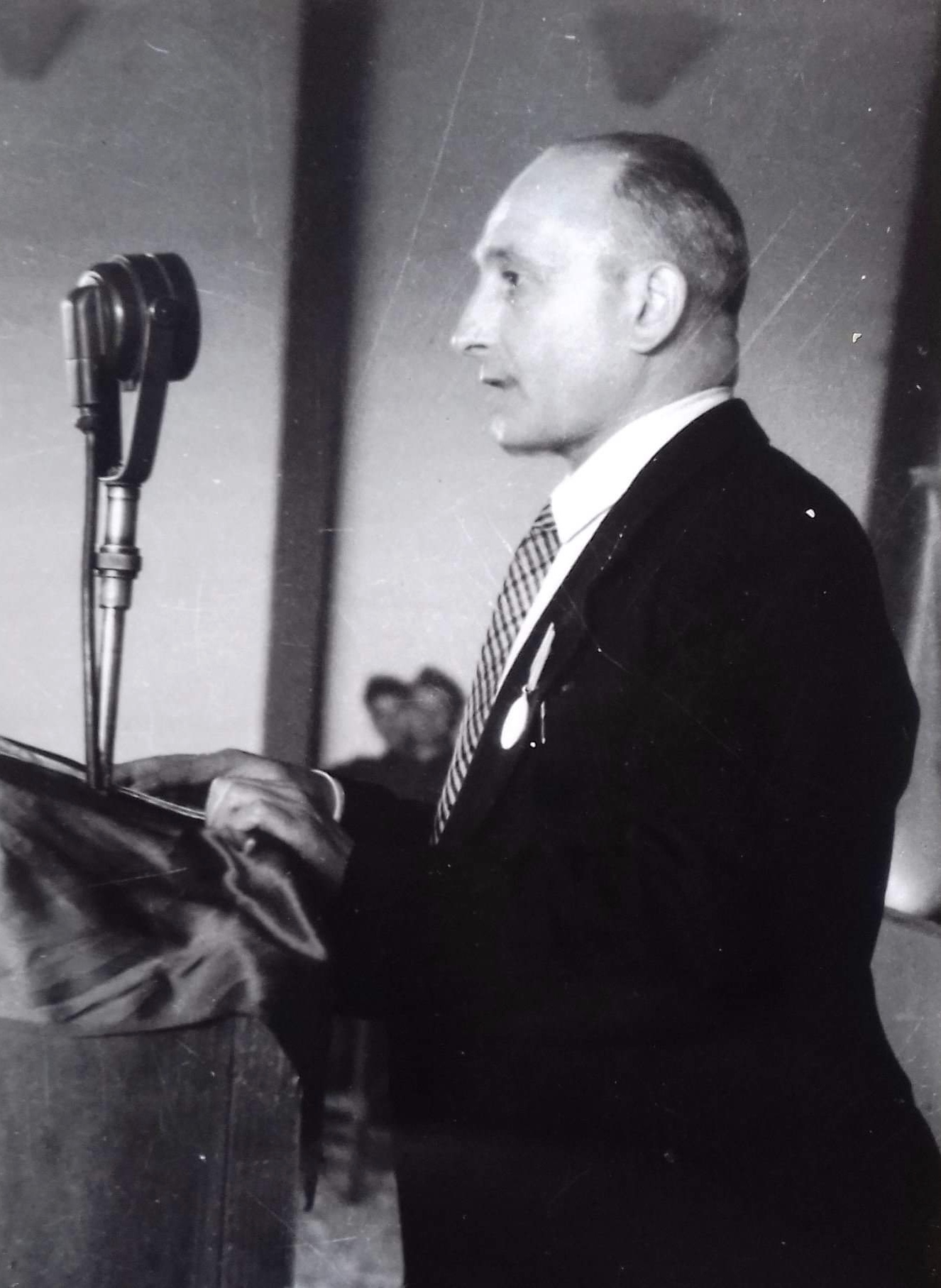
- Sejfulla Malëshova giving a speech
- Born: Sejfulla Malëshova; 2 March 1900; Këlcyrë, Ottoman Empire (modern Albania)
- Died: 9 June 1971 (aged 71); Fier, Albania
- Citizenship: Ottoman, Albanian
- Occupations: Writer, politician
- Relatives: Tasim Hoxha and Pashako Hoxha (Parents)
- Writing career
- Pen name: Lame Kodra
- Language: Albanian

Sejfulla Malëshova (2 March 1900 – 9 June 1971) was an Albanian politician, writer and translator. He was an early member of the Communist leadership in post-World War II Albania and served as the Ministry of Culture and Propaganda.

== Biography ==
Malëshova was born in Këlcyrë as the son of Tasim and Pashako Hoxha. His family was of Gheg Albanian descent. He was educated in Vlorë and later studied medicine in Italy. During studies, together with his friend Odhis Paskalin, he started publishing in "Studenti Shqiptar" his first poems. In 1924, a 23-year-old Malëshova became Fan Noli's personal secretary. After Noli's government was overthrown, Malëshova fled to Vienna, where he joined KONARE, a revolutionary organization founded by Albanian leftists. He went to Moscow and Leningrad with a delegation of the group where he translated the Communist Manifesto into Albanian. In 1930–1932, he joined the Communist Party of the Soviet Union, but was subsequently expelled as a Bukharinist. He joined the Albanian Communist Party and was a member of its Politburo before 1946. After Moscow, he moved to Paris where other Albanian revolutionaries like Llazar Fundo had settled. There was a rivalry between the two and twice Malëshova denounced Fundo as a Bukharinist. In 1938, after the Comintern ordered Fundo's death, Malëshova attempted to murder him with an axe.

During World War II, he became known under the name Lame Kodra, and described himself as a rebel poet. In 1946, he was appointed Minister of Culture and Propaganda and elected president of the nascent League of Writers and Artists of AlbaniaThe League took over the publication of well-known Albanian literature Drita magazine.

Malëshova became known as a moderate communist, putting him at odds with Enver Hoxha. In 1946, Koçi Xoxe, working under orders from Yugoslavia purged a number of members of the party, including Malëshova, who was denounced as a "right-wing opportunist". In 1947, he was tried for subversive activities and imprisoned.

After leaving prison, Malëshova spent the rest of his life as a warehouseman in Fier, shunned by almost all his fellow citizens. If anyone dared speak to him, he would pinch his lips with his fingers, to remind them of the vow of eternal silence which would ensure his survival. He died there, an outcast, in 1971. His funeral was attended only by his sister, the gravedigger and two Sigurimi agents.
