= Qytezë =

- Village
- Location within Albania
- Coordinates: 40°29′51″N 20°53′41″E
- Country: Albania
- County: Korçë
- Municipality: Devoll
- Administrative unit: Miras
- Time zone: UTC+1 (CET)
  - Summer (DST): UTC+2 (CEST)

Qytezë (or Qyteza in its definite form in Albanian) is a community in Korçë County, southern Albania. At the 2015 local government reform it became part of the municipality Devoll. The settlement is known for being the birthplace of Adam Anastas Beloushi, the father of comedian/actor/musicians, John and James Belushi.

Qyteza (Albanian: little town) was formed during the 18th century from the Orthodox settlers of nearby abandoned villages, wrecked from the Ottoman oppression. Local people have contributed to the Albanian National Awakening, June Revolution, and the National Liberation Movement (Albania).

Vasil Tromara, an Albanian patriot, is remembered for raising the Albanian flag in Korçë, on November 28, 1920, marking the end of the inter-dependencies of the region and final incorporation in Albania.

Migration has always characterized the village; nowadays only a few families are still residing in it.

== People ==
- Belushi family (see John and James Belushi)
- John Papajani, former Washington State Senator
- Aristotel Samsuri, Albanian footballer and Communist partisan, proclaimed national martyr in 1981 having died in German captivity in World War II
- Petraq Samsuri, Albanian writer
- Kolë Tromara, patriot, Vatra activist, leader of Balli Kombëtar
- Vasil Tromara, Albanian patriot and freedom fighter
