= Anës lumejve =

1928 Albanian poem by Fan Noli

Anës lumenjve (By the rivers)
- Author: Fan S. Noli
- Language: Albanian
- Publication place: Albania

Anës lumenjve (By the rivers) is a poem in the Albanian language by Fan S. Noli, in which the history of Albania is described. The poem was released in 1928, after Noli himself had been ousted from his position of Prime Minister by Ahmed Zogu's coup, which would later make a monarchy of the country, a republic since its independence in 1912.

The poem is mainly an exile's lamentation for how close the country came to modernisation (the title is thus to be interpreted: most of the rivers along which the action is set are Albanian, yet the country itself is "along" the Elbe and the Spree, that is, next to Central and Western Europe, and it is all the more painful to see it fall short of political, social and cultural maturity as it is an integral part of that continent and culture from which those ideals hail), which leads the narrating voice to a point of despair until, as if a natural phenomenon, he can hear (or, rather, predict), the people rising up in arms, as they had when fighting for independence, in order to expel the tyrant (Zog himself insofar as he has throttled the reformist atmosphere of the post-independence period, and all the foreign aims and interests the future King, helped to power by the Yugoslavs and ultimately ousted, in 1939, by the Italians); this expectation, although far from completion, allows the poet to close with the same words as in the beginning, in the same condition, yet in a hopeful, rejuvenated mood.

Notable about the style is a frenetic rhythm, a rich, heterogeneous language and imagery, and a very strong musical frame; the second stanza, especially, is filled with Turkish loanwords, common yet noticeable to an Albanian speaker's ear for their "foreignness", which, so tightly clustered, suggestively hint at the country's recent past as a mere province of a large and indifferent Empire. Also notable is the repetition of the first four lines, minimally altered, at the end, and the way the proximity to the Elbe and the Spree, that is, the West and all hopes of modernisation, is a source for grief to the desperate exile of the poem's beginning, and yet one more reason for hope and solace once his "faith" in his own countrymen's action is restored.

== Poem ==
Original Albanian

Arratisur, syrgjynosur,
Rraskapitur dhe katosur
Po vajtonj pa funt, pa shpresë,
Anës Elbë-s, anës Spree-së.
Ku e lam' e ku na mbeti,
Vaj-vatani e mjer mileti,
Anës detit i palarë,
Anës dritës i paparë,
Pranë sofrës i pangrënë,
Pranë dijes i panxënë,
Lakuriq dhe i dregosur,
Trup e shpirt i sakatosur.

Se ç'e shempnë derbederët,
Mercenarët dhe bejlerët,
Se ç'e shtypnë jabanxhinjtë,
Se ç'e shtrythnë fajdexhinjtë,
Se ç'e pren' e se ç'e vranë,
Ç'e shkretuan anembanë,
Nënë thundrën e përdhunës
Anës Vjosës, anës Bunës.

Çirrem, digjem i vrerosur,
Sakatosur, çarmatosur,
As i gjall', as i varrosur,
Pres një shenj' e pres një dritë,
Pres me vjet' e pres me ditë,
Se ç'u tera, se ç'u mpaka,
Se ç'u çora, se ç'u mplaka,
Larg prej vatrës dhe prej punës,
Anës Rinit, anës Tunës.
Çakërdisur, batërdisur,
Përpëlitur dhe zalisur,
Ëndërronj pa fund, pa shpresë,
Anës Elbë-s, anës Spree-së.

Dhe një zë vengon nga lumi,
Më buçet, më zgjon nga gjumi,
Se mileti po gatitet,
Se tirani lebetitet,
Se pëlcet, kërcet furtuna,
Fryhet Vjosa, derdhet Buna,
Skuqet Semani dhe Drini,
Dridhet beu dhe zengjini,
Se pas vdekjes ndriti jeta
Dhe kudo gjëmon trumbeta.
Ngrehuni dhe bjeruni,
Korini dhe shtypini,
Katundar' e punëtorë,
Që nga Shkodra gjer në Vlorë!

Ky ilaç e ky kushtrim
më bën djal' e më bën trim,
më jep forc' e më jep shpresë,
anës Elbë-s, anës Spree-së.
Se pas dimrit vjen një verë,
që do kthehemi njëherë,
pranë vatrës, pranë punës,
Anës Vjosës, anës Bunës.

Arratisur, syrgjynosur,
Raskapitur e katosur,
brohoras me bes' e shpresë,
anës Elbë-s, anës Spree-së.

English translation

Fugitive, banished,
Distraught and exhausted,
I grieve endlessly, hopelessly,
Along the Elbe, along the Spree.
How far we got, and how little we got,
Woe the country, the wretched people!
Along the sea, yet unwashed,
Along the light, yet unseen,
Near the table, yet starving,
Near knowledge, yet unschooled,
Naked and unaware,
Body and soul crippled.

How the beggars humiliated it,
The mercenaries, and the lords!
How the outlanders crushed it,
How the usurers throttled it,
How they cut it, how they wounded it
And made a wasteland of it,
Under the heel of aggression,
Along the Vjosa, along the Buna.

I wail, I burn, disheartened,
Crippled, disarmed,
Neither alive, nor yet buried,
I wait for a sign, and I wait for a light,
I wait for years, and I wait for days,
And how I've dried out, how I have waned,
How I've got blinder, and how I've grown older,
Far from the hearth and from work,
Along the Rhine, along the Thun.
Twisted, distraught,
Writhing and fainting,
I dream endlessly, hopelessly,
Along the Elbe, along the Spree.

And a voice grows from the river,
It rings, wakes me up from sleep,
Tells that th' countryside's uprising,
That the tyrant's growing pale,
That storm's gathering, exploding,
Swells the Vjosa, floods the Buna,
The Seman's blood red, so is the Drin,
Beys and landlords start to shudder,
Tells that come death, there'll be life
And the alarm blows through the country –
Get up and sound it,
Reap and revolt,
Peasants and workers,
Up from Shkodra South to Vlorë!

Such a drug and such a drill
Makes me young, it makes me brave,
Gives me strength and gives me hope,
Along the Elbe, along the Spree;
For, gone Winter, comes a Summer,
which will see one day our return,
back to our hearth, back to work,
Along the Vjosa, along the Buna.

Fugitive, banished,
Distraught and exhausted,
I cherish with faith and hope,
Along the Elbe, along the Spree.

== See also ==
- Albanian literature
