= Koçi Xoxe =

Albanian politician (1911–1949)

General Koçi Xoxe
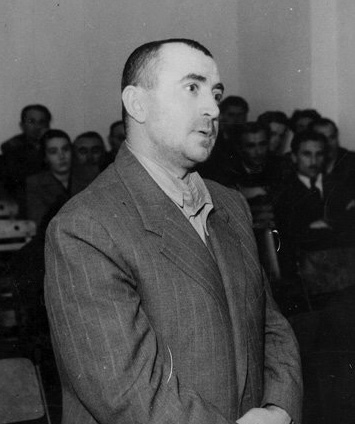

Deputy Prime Minister of Albania
- In office 22 March 1946 – 2 October 1948
- President: Enver Hoxha
- Succeeded by: Mehmet Shehu

Minister of the Interior
- In office 22 March 1946 – 2 October 1948
- President: Enver Hoxha
- Preceded by: Haxhi Lleshi
- Succeeded by: Nesti Kerënxhi

Personal details
- Pronunciation: [ˈkɔtʃi ˈdzɔdzɛ]
- Born: 1 May 1911 Negovan, Manastir Vilayet, Ottoman Empire (modern Flampouro, Florina, Greece)
- Died: 11 June 1949 (aged 38) Tirana, Albania
- Cause of death: Execution by firing squad
- Party: Party of Labour of Albania
- Spouse: Sofika Xoxe

Military service
- Allegiance: People's Republic of Albania
- Branch/service: Albanian People's Army
- Rank: General

Koçi Xoxe (pronounced [ˈkɔtʃi ˈdzɔdzɛ]; 1 May 1911 – 11 June 1949) was an Albanian politician who served as Deputy Prime Minister and Minister of the Interior of the People's Socialist Republic of Albania. He was supported by Yugoslav leader Josip Broz Tito during efforts to bring Albania into the Yugoslav federation. After Albania's leader, Enver Hoxha, established the country's independence with the support of the Soviet Union, Xoxe was arrested, tried on charges of treason, and executed.

== Life ==
Xoxe was born in 1911 in Negovani (modern Flampouro), near Florina in Greece, back then part of the Manastir Vilayet of the Ottoman Empire. He was of Tosk Albanian descent. Some sources say he is of Slav Macedonian origin His family originated from Kolonjë, and due to economic circumstances in the 19th century moved to the village of Plikati and later relocated to Negovani.

His father was Dhimitër Xoxe (1883–1971) who died in Tirana and Vasillo was his mother. Sotir Xoxe was his grandfather, a founder of the Albanian school in Negovani and a teacher who was involved in the Albanian National Awakening. In his youth Xoxe was educated by his grandfather in the village school, later he attended the gymnasium of Thessaloniki and achieved high grades, graduating in 1929. His grandfather and several family members moved to Constanța, Romania in the 1930s where he owned and ran Dituria, an Albanian printing press.

Xoxe was a footballer for the Negovani village football team, an avid reader of Albanian and Greek books and a fluent speaker of Albanian, Greek, Bulgarian and Romanian. Following his education, Xoxe arrived in Korçë where he encountered communist ideas and literature. In the 1930s, he became co–founder of the Korçë Communist Group and its first chairman. Around 1937 he emerged among others, such as Enver Hoxha and Koço Tashko, as prominent communists of Albania.

In the post-World War II era, Yugoslav leader Josip Broz Tito sought to exert his country’s influence over Albania through military support to Hoxha in an attempt to absorb Albania. Xoxe, who headed the Ministry of the Interior and the secret police, the Sigurimi, was supported by Tito. Joseph Stalin reportedly told Milovan Djilas, a leading figure in Yugoslavia, that Yugoslavia should “swallow up” Albania.

Hoxha began to fear Xoxe as a rival to his own power. After Xoxe ordered the arrest of moderates with anti-Yugoslav sentiments, including Sejfulla Malëshova, Tito attacked Hoxha in a letter to the Albanian Politburo. Hoxha responded by traveling to Moscow with Nako Spiru and returning with a formal trade agreement with the Soviet Union without consulting Tito.

Tito began to develop a more assertive policy towards the Soviets, which angered Stalin. Over time, Stalin began to side with Albania as a supportive bulwark against Tito. The Soviet Union began to increase Moscow’s presence in the country, spending specialists in mining and oil refining. Xoxe accused Spiru of subversion and, eventually, Spiru was found dead of a gunshot wound in his apartment under suspicious circumstances.

Tito attempted to deploy two army divisions into Albania's territory under the pretext of protecting it from a Greek invasion, despite this being in contravention of the Albanian government's wishes. Tito then pushed Xoxe to convene a meeting of the Central Committee, where he expelled a number of Hoxha’s supporters and proposed a motion to merge Albania’s economy and military with Yugoslavia’s. Hoxha, with support from the Soviets, fought back, with him abrogating the treaties agreed to with Yugoslavia and expelling Yugoslav advisors in Albania. Hoxha argued that Xoxe was engaged in a plot to transform Albania into a colony of Yugoslavia, pointing to the attempts of the Yugoslav army to deploy into Albania, and the various treaties which subordinated Albanian economic planning to the national plan of Yugoslavia. Xoxe attempted to save himself by declaring his support for the Soviet Union and arresting supporters of Tito in the government. The Central Committee, however, flipped on Xoxe, stripping him of his posts and expelling him from the party. In November 1948, he and many others were arrested.

Enver Hoxha, and later Joseph Stalin, argued that Tito was the mastermind of multiple anti-Marxist and anti-Albanian activities across the Balkans, with the trials of Xoxe and his allies being the first of multiple purges against "Titoites" in the Eastern Bloc. Xoxe admitted to conspiring with Tito against the Albanian government. In May 1949, he was placed on trial where he confessed to having been recruited by Zog I of Albania, as well as British intelligence. At trial he also stated that he was part of a Tito-backed plot among the pro-Yugoslav faction of the Albanian Communist Party to assassinate Enver Hoxha. Xoxe was sentenced to death and was hanged on June 11, 1949.

== Personal life ==
Xoxe was married to Sofika and had six children, Genc, Fatos, Shpresa, Liria, Çlirim and Besnik.
