= Nako Spiru =

Albanian politician

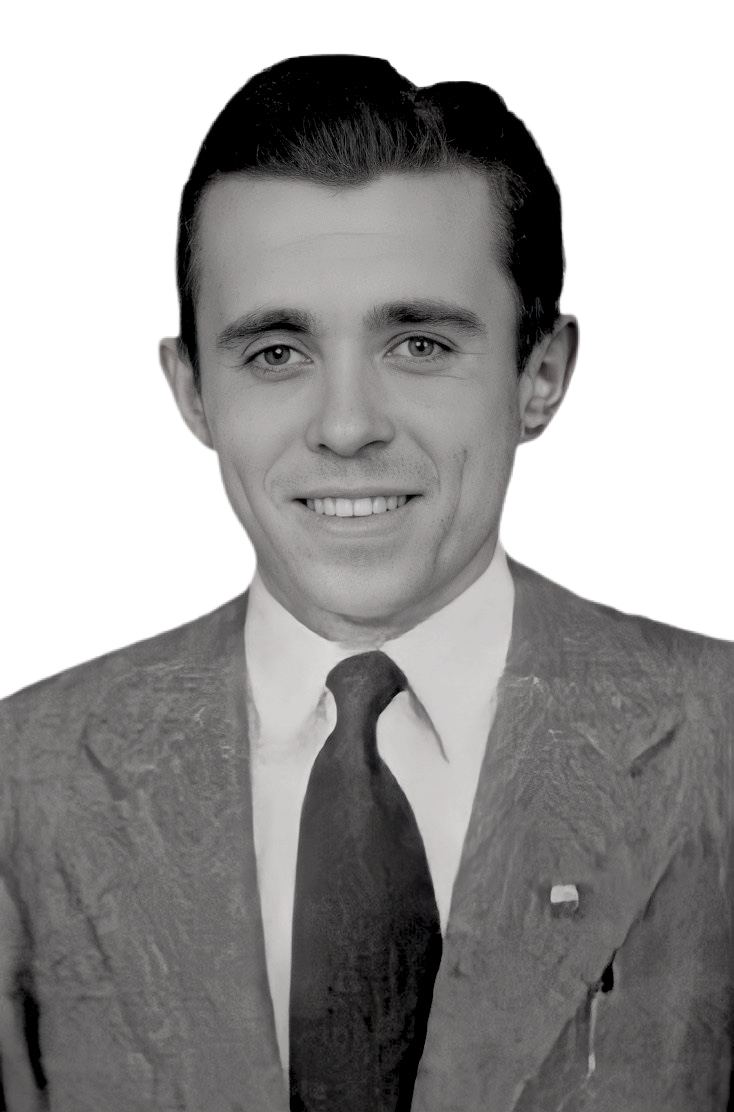

Minister of Economy and Industry
- In office 22 March 1946 – 20 November 1947

Personal details
- Born: January 4, 1918 Durrës, Albania
- Died: November 20, 1947 (aged 29) Tirana, PR Albania
- Cause of death: Assassinated
- Spouse: Liri Belishova
- Awards: Honor of the Nation

Athanas Spiru, known as Nako Spiru (4 January 1918 – 20 November 1947), was an Albanian politician and high-ranking official of the Communist Party of Albania (PKSh). He served as Minister of Economy and Industry from 1946 until his untimely death the following year.

== Early life ==
Nako Spiru was born on 4 January 1918 to a wealthy Orthodox family in the port city of Durrës. He was the third of four children born to teacher Perikli Spiru and Kasiani Papa. He had two older sisters (Titika and Eleonora), and a younger brother (Kristaq). Spiru completed boys' primary school in his hometown during the years 1926‒1929. He studied in the Italian Commercial College of Corfu and later economics at the University of Turin.

== Life ==
After the Italian invasion of Albania in 1939, he joined the resistance and served as the right hand of Enver Hoxha in the National Liberation Movement. In 1941, he became member of the newly founded Communist Party of Albania. After the assassination of Qemal Stafa, he came in charge of the Youth section of the Party.

After the end of World War II, Spiru was elected to lead the "State Planning Commission", the highest entity in the economical sphere in Albania. Soon he would become one of the victims of the factional war inside the Party: on one hand, the so-called "intellectuals" or "moderates" led by Mehmet Shehu and Sejfulla Malëshova and on the other hand the so-called "workers" under the leadership of Koçi Xoxe, Deputy Prime Minister and Minister of Interior, also head of the State Security Service Sigurimi. They first pushed towards relationship with the Soviet Union, then later with Yugoslavia.

Spiru opposed Xoxe's friendship and economic agreement of July 1946, which imposed a merger of the economies of Albania and Yugoslavia, with the ultimate goal the integration of Albania into the Yugoslav Federation as one of the republics. Communist Party General Secretary and Prime Minister Enver Hoxha feared a switch controlled by Tito on the Albanian Communist Party, and took the side of Xoxe's faction. In April 1947, Spiru led new negotiations in Belgrade, where he asked for the conclusion of a revised trade agreement and increased economic aid. The Yugoslavs refused and called instead for the immediate coordination of the economic plans of both states. With the backing of Hoxha, Spiru refused. Instead Hoxha and Spiru flew in July 1947 to Moscow and concluded a trade agreement with the Soviet Union, which guaranteed to Albania safe-ground for the refusal of the Yugoslavian support.

Supported by Tito, Xoxe began a smear campaign against Spiru. In November 1947, Xoxe accused him at a meeting of the Central Committee for "anti-Party, nationalist activity". The next day he was found shot in his office. One initial official explanation for his death was that he killed himself accidentally while handling his gun, a second official announcement declared the death as suicide from "remorse over his betrayal". After the demise of Xoxe for being a "spy" and "Titoist", things changed. Spiru's figure was rehabilitated and it was said "to have been murdered by the Sigurimi on behalf of Xoxe, or been forced to suicide". Spiru was married to Liri Belishova, a member of the Politburo of the Party of Labour of Albania who would be expelled and persecuted in 1960 for her pro-Soviet stance during the Albanian–Soviet split.
