= Riza Cerova =

Albanian politician

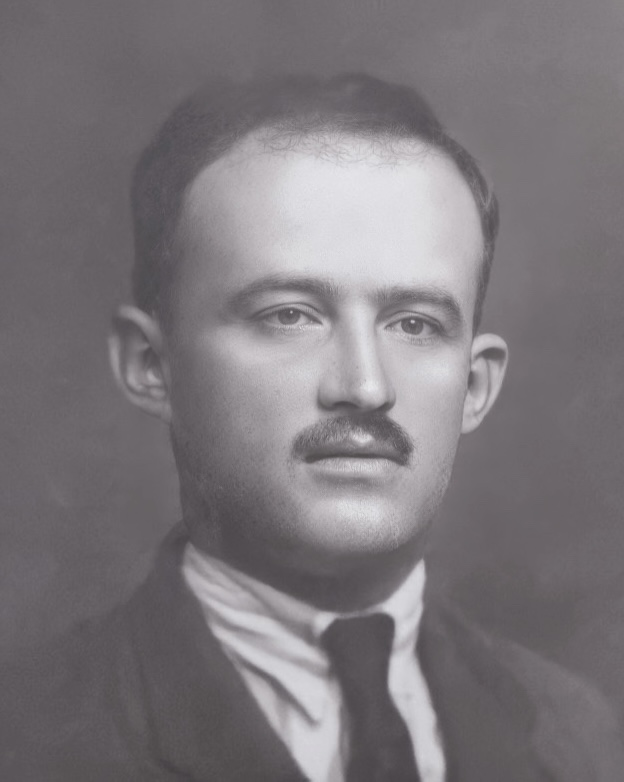
Portrait of Riza Cerova

Riza Cerova (1896–1935) was an Albanian political figure of the early 20th century. He is mostly known for his role during June Revolution of 1924 and Fier uprising of 1935.

== Early life and migration ==
Riza Cerova was born in the village of Cerovë in Skrapar region, then part of the Ottoman Empire. In his early youth he attended school first in Thessaloniki and then in Constantinople. He returned in the area that is today Albania (these travels had not at the time taken him outside the Ottoman Empire) in 1911. During 1913-1914 he participated in fights against Greek troops in southern Albania. He was enlisted in the Albanian army, and participated in the skirmish against the rebels of Elez Isufi in 1922. Riza Cerova was one of the leading figures of June Revolution of 1924, which overthrew the regime of Iliaz Vrioni and installed an authoritarian government under Fan Noli. Following the defeat of June Revolution he migrated and joined the Communist Party of Germany in 1930. During that period he wrote many articles against King Zog I. Cerova's articles were published in media like Liria Kombëtare, a journal published by KONARE (Komiteti Nacional Revolucionar, National Revolutionary Committee), an organization founded by Fan Noli in Vienna with other participants of the 1924 revolution.

== 1935 Uprising ==
In March 1935 he returned to Albania from the Soviet Union and was one of the main leaders of Fier uprising. Cerova in the following months enrolled many peasants of the Mallakastra and Skrapar regions in the anti-Zogist movement. He was killed in a clash against government forces in the Mokra region in August 1935.

== Legacy ==
After World War II and the establishment of Communism in Albania he became a hero figure. Several institutions are named after him and a documentary about his life was produced in 1978 He was rewarded People's Hero of Albania title.

== See also ==
- History of Albania
