= Avni Rustemi =

Hero of Albania

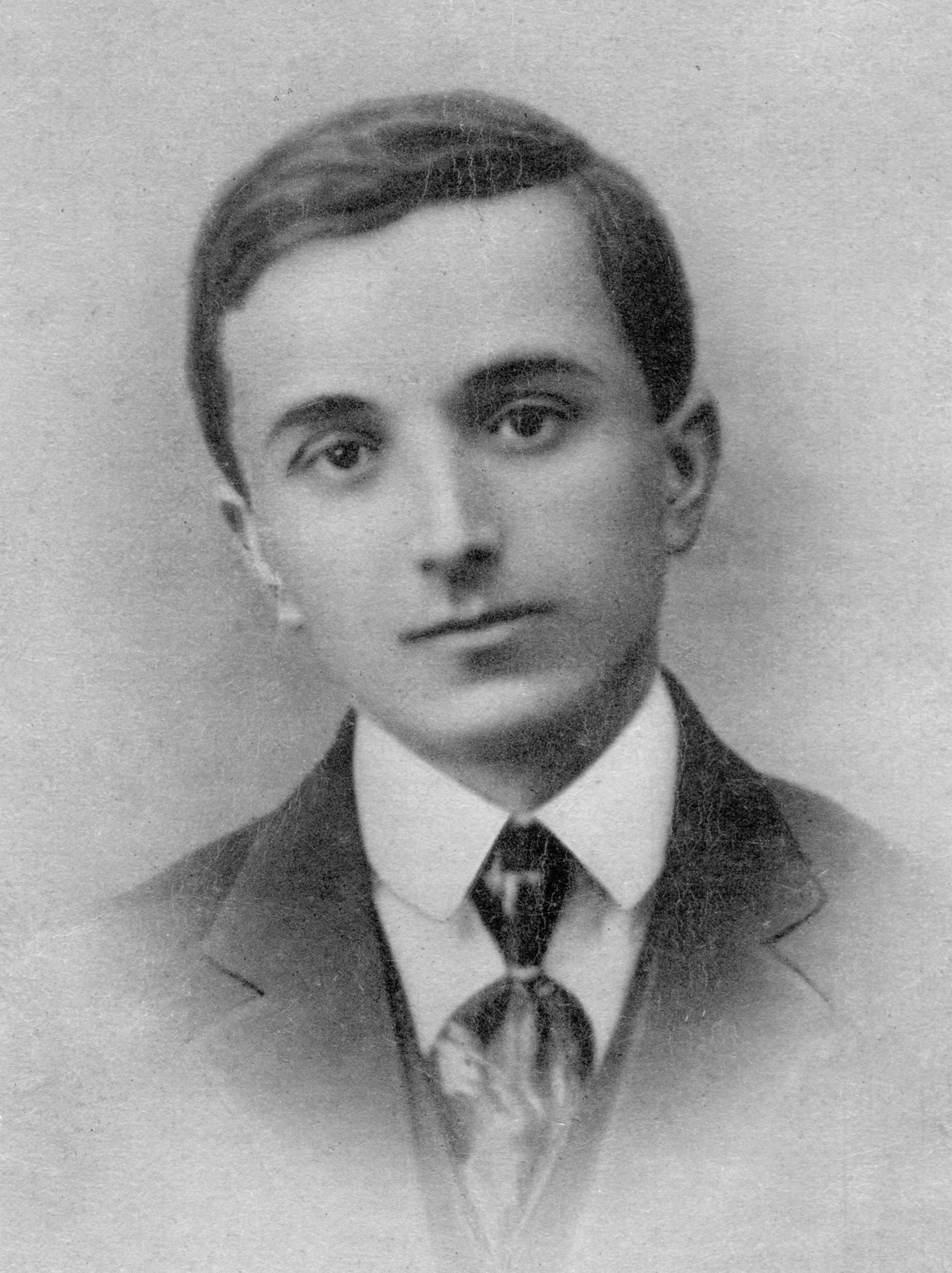
- Avni Rustemi in the 1920s
- Born: 22 September 1895; Libohovë, Gjirokastër, Janina Vilayet, Ottoman Empire (modern Albania)
- Died: 22 April 1924 (aged 28); Tirana, Principality of Albania
- Cause of death: Assassinated by Jusuf Reçi
- Occupations: Member of Parliament, Writer, Politician
- Awards: Hero of the People

Avni Rustemi (22 September 1895 – 22 April 1924) was an Albanian patriot, revolutionary, teacher, activist and member of the Albanian parliament. Rustemi was the leader of numerous patriotic societies and associations and also a member of the democratic opposition in the Albanian National Assembly preceding the Revolution of June 1924. He is most well-known and celebrated for having assassinated Essad Pasha Toptani - an Albanian politician who is remembered amongst Albanians as a symbol of treason and as one of the most negative historical figures of the 20th century - and his founding and leadership of the Bashkimi association, which played an important role in Albanian politics during the June Revolution.

== Biography ==
=== Early life ===
Avni Rustemi was born into an Muslim family in Libohovë on 26 September 1895. His father was the steward of the estates of a prominent landowner in the region. Some biographers claim that he left school at the age of 13 to join the çeta of Çerçiz Topulli, whilst others do not mention this series of events. According to his own statements, Rustemi studied within the Ottoman provincial school network, attending the secondary school of Janina from 1907 onwards before attending high school in Istanbul from 1910 onwards. In 1912-1913, he studied at a teaching college in Geneva, and is reported to have fought against Greek forces in southern Albania in 1914.

Rustemi would continue his studies again in Janina in 1917. He also attended the teachers' training school in Elbasan before going on to teach at numerous places, with his teaching career beginning in 1917 during the Italian occupation of Albania. He would continue his studies in Italy by attending the College of Saint Adrian in the Arbëreshë town of San Demetrio Corone in Calabria in 1919, but he did not graduate from there, and finally at the University of Rome in 1920. Rustemi was close to the Mbrojtja Kombëtare ("Defense of the Homeland") committees of Vlorë, Përmet, and Tepelenë, and he also reportedly founded the Vlora Youth Association in Albania in 1918, and then, in 1919 or 1920, the League of Albanian Youths in Italy (either at San Demetrio Corone or Rome).

=== Assassination of Essad Pasha ===
On 13 June 1920, Rustemi assassinated Essad Pasha Toptani outside the Hotel Continental in Paris. Essad Pasha was an unscrupulous opportunist and a close collaborator of the Serbians and Montenegrins, who he aided in partitioning Albanian territories during the Balkan Wars. Rustemi was immediately arrested by French police, and the assassination caught the attention of the European press. Rustemi was acquitted for the crime before a French court on 20 December after his lawyer passionately pleaded his case as an act of patriotism. When he returned to Albania, he was lauded by his countrymen as a national hero and thus began his political career as a member of parliament.

=== Independent Albania ===
Rustemi's teaching career continued in independent Albania from 1920 onwards. In April 1921, Rustemi gathered representatives from 25 different associations across the country and officially co-founded the Atdheu ("Fatherland") society in Vlorë on 3 May. The federation had about thirty branches, and although its statutes called for political neutrality, it maintained close ties with the authorities, receiving financial support from the government. In that same year, a professional association of Albanian teachers was formed under the leadership of Rustemi. Known as the Lidhja e Mësuesve, the association was based in the region of Gjirokastër and intended on defending the teaching profession, developing national education and cooperating with other associations to promote the democratic unity of the Albanians. Rustemi was also one of the leaders of the Committee for the National Defence of Kosovo, which supported the Kachak Movement and campaigned for the unification of Albania and Kosovo and for the protection of the rights of Kosovo Albanians.

Funding was soon suspended for the Atdheu society a few months after its establishment, and civil servants were prohibited from becoming members. By August 1922, the Atdheu society was forced to cease its activities by the government, which at this time was dominated by Essad Pasha Toptani's nephew Ahmet Zogu and his feudal landowning supporters, who ordered the police to close all of Atdheu's branches. Rustemi then co-founded the Western-leaning Bashkimi ('Union') society in Tirana, initially with the goal of mobilizing the youth. However, the Bashkimi society eventually came to constitute the anti-Zogist political opposition, which was led by Fan Noli. Rustemi would also become a leader of Fan Noli's Democratic Party. The Bashkimi society, whose motto was "First, correct oneself", promoted a military-like discipline whilst remaining civilian in nature. The association was reinforced by figures such as Kol Tromara, Bedri Pejani and Seit Qemali, who were part of the earlier Krahu Kombëtar movement of 1908, although most of its members were younger and largely educated at the secondary level. Its members mainly came from the former Vilayet of Ioannina, particularly the regions of Vlorë and Gjirokastër, which were not predominantly integrated into the new central state administration of independent Albania. The Bashkimi society emphasised ideals of patriotism, sacrifice, discipline and self-improvement, encouraging youth to develop folklore, history, morality, physical fitness, agriculture and industry through non-violent means. However, with the growing tensions on the Albanian political scene from 1923 onwards, Rustemi and the Bashkimi association were thrust into increasingly violent political developments.

=== Death and aftermath ===
Parliamentary tensions between Ahmet Zogu's feudal landowning conservatives and Fan Noli's politically liberal and democratic faction continued to rise. An unsuccessful assassination attempt was carried out against Ahmet Zogu in parliament on 23 February 1924, by a man by the name of Beqir Valteri. Although Ahmet Zogu implicated Rustemi's involvement, Valteri was acting on his own accord in order to exact revenge as part of a blood feud. Two months later, on 20 April, Rustemi was shot in Tirana and eventually died from his wounds two days later on the 22nd. Most scholars agree that Ahmet Zogu ordered Rustemi's assassination. Rustemi's funeral was held in Vlorë on 30 April and attended by over 10,000 people, and Fan Noli delivered a speech so powerful that it provoked the liberal opposition into an all-out uprising. They blamed Ahmet Zogu for Rustemi's death and decided to overthrow the Zogist government by force, resulting in protests and eventually the June Revolution. Zogu was ousted from power by Fan Noli and his supporters and fled to Yugoslavia, but eventually returned and defeated the revolutionaries with the help of the Yugoslavs, who provided Zogu with military support.

Zogu's return to power caused many Albanian democrats and intellectuals to leave the country. Like Rustemi, many teachers from the Lidhja e Mësuesve took an active part in politics, and after the June Revolution, the school inspector provided a list of teachers from Gjirokastër and Përmet who participated in the revolution to the Zogist authorities. Throughout the June Revolution, the nature of the Bashkimi association was dramatically transformed as members of Bashkimi joined forces with numerous deputies and army officers against the pro-Zogist authorities. Bashkimi had issued an ultimatum to the government and called on the youth to rise in revolt, and in late May 1924, they had even formed a battalion to join the rebel forces and march on Tirana. The association would adopt a highly hierarchical structure and rallied around the figure of Rustemi as a martyr. Nonetheless, after Zogu's return to power, their activities were outlawed and members of the association were forced into exile.

== Perception ==
Rustemi is lauded and celebrated by the Albanians as a national hero for the assassination of Essad Pasha Toptani, who is remembered among Albanians as a traitor and one of the most negative historical figures of the 20th century. After his acquittal for the murder of Essad Pasha, Rustemi played a central role in mobilizing civil society in the new Albanian state. He was also known for his strong participation in cultural societies, believing that associations should serve the cause of democracy and patriotism.

Rustemi's assassination provided the Bashkimi association with a martyr-like figure. Entry into Bashkimi required taking an oath, in which prospective members would swear on their honour and the spirit of Rustemi. Bashkimi's commemorative days also included the anniversary of its founding and the date of Rustemi’s death. Bashkimi, however, cannot be classified as a communist organisation in spite of the efforts of Communist-era Albanian historiography to depict it as such and despite the fact that some of its exiled members would eventually pass through the USSR.

== Film ==
Rustemi has also been the subject of numerous feature films, in most of which he appears as a national hero who killed the traitor of the nation. Two shots in Paris (sq:Dy krisma në Paris) is a drama by Sheri Mita, Pëllumb Kulla with the subject of Essad Pasha Toptani's murder in Paris and Rustemi's trial.
