= Fan Noli =

Prime Minister of Albania in 1924 and writer (1882–1965)

Theofan Stilian Noli
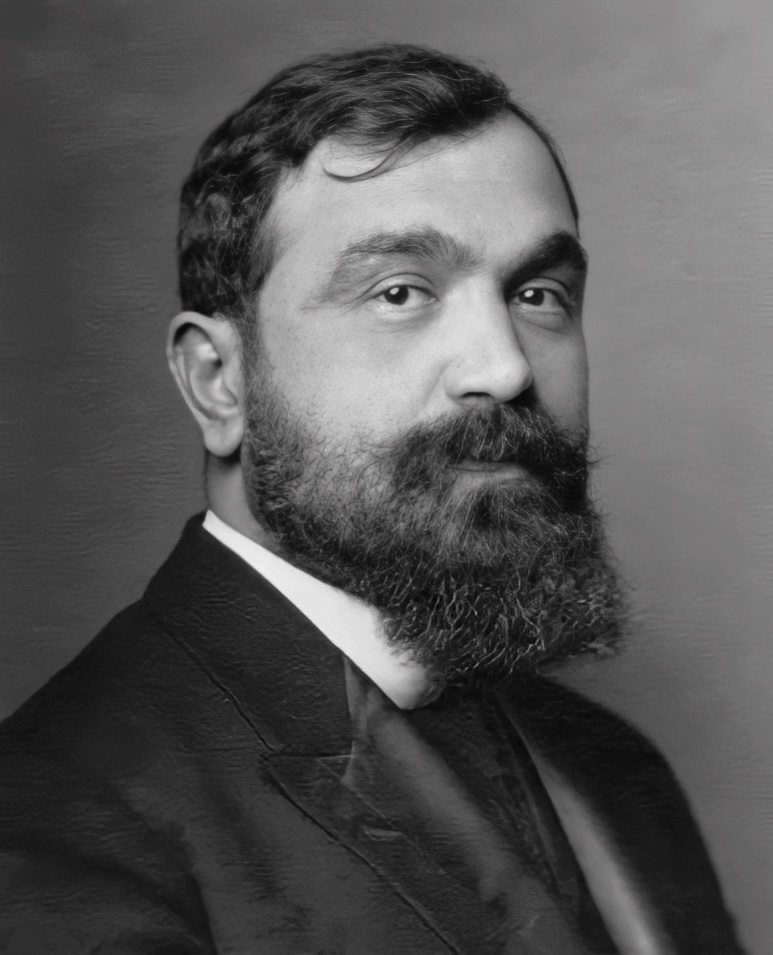
- Noli in c. 1924

13th Prime Minister of Albania
- In office 16 June 1924 – 23 December 1924
- Monarch: Wilhelm I
- Preceded by: Ilias Vrioni
- Succeeded by: Ilias Vrioni

Metropolitan of Durrës
- In office 21 November 1923 – January 1925 (exiled)
- Preceded by: Iakovos of Durrës (under Ecumenical Patriarchate of Constantinople)
- Succeeded by: Visarion of Albania

Personal details
- Born: 6 January 1882 İbriktepe, Vilayet of Adrianople, Ottoman Empire
- Died: 13 March 1965 (aged 83) Fort Lauderdale, Florida, United States
- Party: Albanian Peoples Party; Democratic People’s Party of Albania
- Education: Harvard; Boston University
- Occupation: Writer, priest, Bishop, translator, composer, politician
- Profession: Priest and politician
- Awards: Honor of the Nation

Theofan Stilian Noli, known as Fan Noli (6 January 1882 – 13 March 1965), was an Albanian-American writer, scholar, diplomat, politician, historian, orator, bishop, and founder of the Albanian Orthodox Church and the Albanian Orthodox Archdiocese in America who served as Prime Minister and regent of Albania in 1924 during the June Revolution.

Fan Noli is venerated in Albania as a champion of literature, history, theology, diplomacy, journalism, music, national unity and ecumenism. He played an important role in the consolidation of Albanian as the national language of Albania with numerous translations of world literature masterpieces. He also wrote extensively in English: as a scholar and author of a series of publications on Skanderbeg, Shakespeare, Beethoven, religious texts and translations. He produced a translation of the New Testament in English, The New Testament of our Lord and Savior Jesus Christ from the approved Greek text of the Church of Constantinople and the Church of Greece, published in 1961.

Noli earned degrees at Harvard (1912), the New England Conservatory of Music (1938), and finally his Ph.D. from Boston University (1945). He was ordained a priest in 1908, establishing thereby the Albanian Church and elevating the Albanian language to ecclesiastic use. He briefly resided in Albania after the 1912 declaration of independence. After World War I, Noli led the diplomatic efforts for the reunification of Albania and received the support of US President Woodrow Wilson. Later he pursued a diplomatic-political career in Albania, successfully leading the Albanian bid for membership in the League of Nations.

A respected figure who remained critical of corruption and injustice in the Albanian government, Fan Noli was asked to lead the 1924 June Revolution. He then served as prime minister until his revolutionary government was overthrown by Ahmet Zogu. He was exiled to Italy and permanently settled in the United States in the 1930s, acquiring US citizenship and agreeing to end his political involvement. He spent the rest of his life as an academician, religious leader, and writer.

== Background ==
Fan Noli was born Theofanis Stylianos Mavromatis 1882 in İbriktepe, a small village situated in the Thracian Ottoman Vilayet of Adrianople (modern Turkey) which was originally settled by Albanians from Qyteza. Qyteza is a village in the County of Kolonjë, and İbriktepe was known to the local townspeople as Qyteza at the time. He was an Albanian of the Eastern Orthodox faith. Noli was a descendant of these Orthodox Christian Albanian settlers who fled what is today southern Albania and resettled in Thrace in areas that had been depopulated due to regional conflicts. During his youth, Noli received his education from Greek elementary and secondary schools. As a young man, Noli wandered throughout the Mediterranean Basin, living in Athens in Greece, Alexandria in Egypt and Odessa in Russia, and supported himself as an actor and translator. As well as his native Albanian, he spoke many languages such as Greek, English, French, Turkish, Russian or Arabic. He went to Athens to become a teacher, and there he used the name Theofanis Mavromattis. Thereafter he went as a teacher or a member of a theater in the Albanian diaspora in Egypt, where he followed the Albanian national program. Through his contacts with the Albanian expatriate movement, he became an ardent supporter of his country's nationalist movement and moved to the United States in 1906. He first worked in Buffalo, New York, in a lumber mill and then moved to Boston, Massachusetts, and worked as an operator on a machine which stamped labels on cans. The Young Turks (CUP) had a hostile view of Albanian leaders such as Fan Noli who were doing political activities with the assistance of outside powers.

=== Hudson Incident ===
The earliest Orthodox Christian Albanian immigrants to Boston were communicants of the Greek Orthodox Church, the leadership of which was vehemently opposed to the Albanian nationalist cause. When Kristaq Dishnica, a young factory worker who had died of influenza, was refused burial on the grounds that, as an Orthodox Christian who identified as an Albanian, he was therefore automatically excommunicated from the Greek Orthodox Church, Fan Noli and a group of Albanian émigrés in New England set about laying the groundwork for an independent, autocephalous Albanian Orthodox Church. The event, which came to be known as the Hudson Incident, was a seminal moment in the establishment of an independent Albanian Orthodox Christian religious consciousness. Noli, the new church's first clergyman, was ordained as a priest in 1908 by Archbishop Platon (Rozhdestvensky) of the Russian Church in the United States. By achieving Patriarchal recognition for the autocephaly of the Albanian Orthodox Church and the full translation of the Orthodox liturgy from the original Greek text into Tosk Albanian, Noli aimed to peacefully neutralize and dismantle the ideological platform of Greek irredentism promoted by reactionaries within the Orthodox Church in Albania and to defend the right of Orthodox Christian Albanians to coexist with their Greek neighbors in a secular Republic immune to the sectarian Megali Idea. Noli was a staunch supporter of Albanian patriotic unity and a separation of religion from the state and moreover, considered it important for religious office to be held by clergy fluent in Albanian and possessing Albanian citizenship.

== Political and religious activities ==
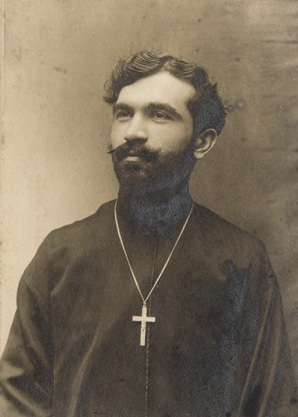
Portrait of a young Fan Noli.

In 1908, Noli began studying at Harvard, completing his Bachelor of Arts degree in 1912. During April 1912 Vatra (Hearth) an Albanian American diaspora organisation was founded with Noli and Faik Konica serving as its leaders and advocating for Albanian sociopolitical self determination with the Ottoman Empire. He returned to Europe to promote Albanian independence, setting foot in Albania for the first time in 1913. Noli returned to the United States during World War I, serving as head of the Vatra organization, which effectively made him leader of the Albanian diaspora. His diplomatic efforts in the United States and Geneva won the support of President Woodrow Wilson for an independent Albania and, in 1920, earned the new national membership in the fledgling League of Nations. Though Albania had already declared its independence in 1912, membership in the League of Nations provided the country with the international recognition it had failed to obtain until then.

In 1921, Noli entered the Albanian Parliament as a representative of the liberal pro-British "People's Party" (Albanian: Partia e Popullit), the chief liberal movement in the country. The other parties were the conservative pro-Italian "Progressive Party" (Albanian: Partia Përparimtare) founded by Mehdi Frashëri and led by Ahmet Zogu, and "Popular Party" (Albanian: Partia Popullore) of Xhafer Ypi. The conservatives of Zogu would dominate the political scene. A Congress of Berat in 1922 was convened to formally lay the foundations of an Albanian Orthodox Church which consecrated Fan Noli as Bishop of Korçë and primate of all Albania while the establishment of the church was seen as important for maintaining Albanian national unity.

Noli served briefly as Foreign Minister in the government of Xhafer Ypi. This was a period of intense turmoil in the country between the liberals and the conservatives. After a botched assassination attempt against Zogu, the conservatives revenged themselves by assassinating another popular liberal politician, Avni Rustemi. Noli's speech at Rustemi's funeral was so powerful that liberal supporters rose up against Zogu and forced him to flee to Yugoslavia (March 1924). Zogu was succeeded briefly by his father-in-law, Shefqet Vërlaci, and by the liberal politician Iliaz Vrioni; Noli was named prime minister and regent on 16 June 1924.

== Downfall and exile ==
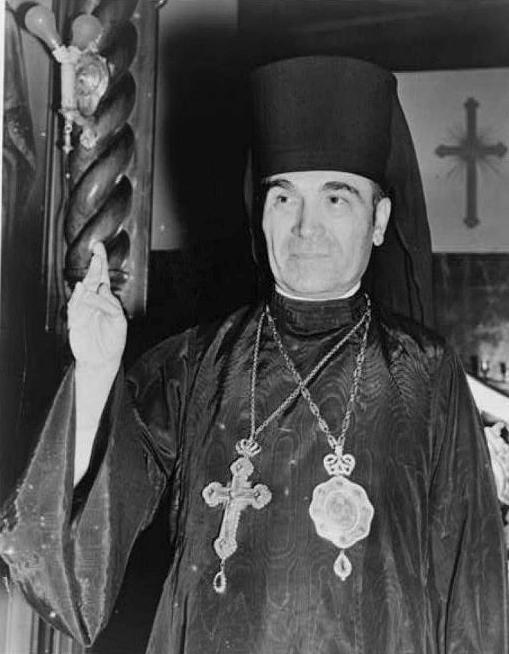
Bishop Fan Noli, founder of the Orthodox Autocephalous Church of Albania (1939).

Despite his efforts to reform the country, Noli's "Twenty Point Program" was unpopular, and his government was overthrown by groups loyal to Zogu on Christmas Eve of that year. Two weeks later, Zogu returned to Albania, and Noli fled to Italy under sentence of death.

Conscious of his fragile position, Zogu took drastic measures to consolidate his return to power. By the end of winter, two of the main leaders of the opposition, Bajram Curri and Luigj Gurakuqi, were assassinated, while others were imprisoned.

Noli founded the "National Committee" (Albanian: Komiteti Nacional Revolucionar) also known as KONARE in Vienna. The committee published the periodical called "National Freedom" (Albanian: Liria Kombëtare). Some of the early Albanian communists as Halim Xhelo or Riza Cerova would start their publishing activities here. The committee aimed in overthrowing Zogu and his cast and restoring democracy. Despite the efforts, the committee's access and influence in Albania would be limited. With the intervention of Kosta Boshnjaku, an old communist and KONARE member, the organization would receive unconditioned monetary support from the Comintern. Also Noli and Boshnjaku would make possible for exile members of the Committee for the National Defence of Kosovo (outlawed by Zogu) to get the same financial support.

In 1928, KONARE changed its name to "Committee of National Liberation" (Albanian: Komiteti i Çlirimit Kombëtar). Meanwhile, in Albania, after three years of republican regime, the "National Council" declared Albania a Constitutional Monarchy, and Ahmet Zogu became king. Noli moved back to the United States in 1932 and formed a republican opposition to Zogu, who had since proclaimed himself "King Zog I". Over the next years, he continued his education, studying and later teaching Byzantine music, and continued developing and promoting the autocephalous Albanian Orthodox Church he had helped to found.

After the war, Noli established some ties with the communist government of Enver Hoxha, which seized power in 1944. He unsuccessfully urged the U.S. government to recognize the regime, but Hoxha's increasing persecution of all religions prevented Noli's church from maintaining ties with the Orthodox hierarchy in Albania. Despite the Hoxha regime's anticlerical bent, Noli's ardent Albanian nationalism brought the bishop to the attention of the U.S. Federal Bureau of Investigation (FBI). The FBI's Boston office kept the bishop under investigation for more than a decade with no final outcome to the probe.

In 1945, Fan S. Noli received a doctor's degree (Ph.D.) in history from Boston University, writing a dissertation on Skanderbeg. In the meantime, he also conducted research at Boston University Music Department, publishing a biography on Ludwig van Beethoven. He also composed a one-movement symphony called Scanderbeg in 1947. Toward the end of his life, Noli retired to Fort Lauderdale, Florida, where he died in 1965.

Fan Noli is interred in Forest Hills Cemetery, situated in the southern part of Boston's Jamaica Plain neighborhood.

The Albanian Orthodox Archdiocese in America founded by Noli went on to join the Orthodox Church in America, today led by Metropolitan Tikhon Mollard as the Albanian Archdiocese. Until recently overseen by Archbishop Nikon of Boston and the Very Reverend Arthur E. Liolin, the Albanian Archdiocese of the Orthodox Church in America is currently headed by Bishop Nikodhim (Preston). It consists of eleven urban and suburban parishes situated primarily in the urban centers of the Northeastern United States and the Midwestern United States. The Autocephalous Orthodox Church of Albania, which Noli served in Albania, is presided over by Archbishop Joani of Albania following the repose of Archbishop Anastasios of Albania, headquartered in the Albanian capital city of Tirana and a member of the World Council of Churches. In addition, the Greek Orthodox Archdiocese of America administers two Albanian Orthodox parishes in Boston and Chicago. All Albanian Orthodox parishes are today in full communion with one another and with the broader worldwide body of the Orthodox Church and fully recognized by the Ecumenical Patriarchate of Constantinople.

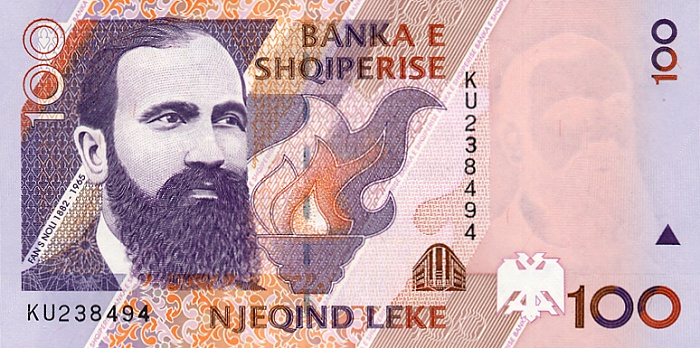
Noli on a 1996 100 lekë banknote.

Writing in his diary two days after Noli's death, Albanian leader Enver Hoxha gave his analysis of Noli's work:

As we are informed, Fan S. Noli died from an operation done last week in which, because of his age, he did not survive. A cerebral hemorrhage caused a quick death. Noli was one of the prominent political and literary figures of the beginning of this century. The balance sheet of his life was positive ... Fan Noli today enjoys a great popularity in our country, deserved as a literary translator and music critic. He was a prominent promoter of the Albanian language. His original works and translations, especially of Shakespeare, of Omar Khayyám and Blasco Ibáñez, are immortal. But especially his anti-Zogist, anti-feudal elegies and poems are beautiful jewels that have inspired and will inspire our youth, especially in creativity. He was also respected as a realistic politician, as a revolutionary democrat in ideology and politics. The Party has assessed the figure of Noli. As is deserved, we have had a patriotic duty to point out the really great merits of his in literature, the history of the arts, and his merits and weaknesses in politics. I think we will do our best in bringing his body to Albania, as this distinguished son of the people, the revolutionary patriot, deserves to bask in his homeland, which he loved and fought for his entire life.

— Enver Hoxha

Fan S. Noli is depicted on the obverse of the Albanian 100 lekë banknote issued in 1996. It remained in use until 2008 when it was replaced by a coin.

== Poems ==
The following poems were written by Fan Noli:

- Hymni i Flamurit
- Thomsoni dhe Kuçedra
- Jepni për Nënën
- Moisiu në mal
- Marshi i Krishtit
- Krishti me kamçikun
- Shën Pjetrin në Mangall
- Marshi i Barabbajt
- Marshi i Kryqësmit
- Kirenari
- Kryqësmi
- Kënga e Salep-Sulltanit
- Syrgjyn-vdekur
- Shpell' e Dragobisë
- Rent, or Marathonomak!
- Anës lumejve
- Plak, topall dhe ashik
- Sofokliu
- Tallja përpara Kryqit
- Sulltani dhe kabineti
- Saga e Sermajesë
- Lidhje e paçkëputur
- Çepelitja
- Vdekja e Sulltanit

== See also ==
- History of Albania
- Religion in Albania
- Solomon Goldstein

Political offices
Preceded by Iliaz Vrioni	Prime Minister of Albania; 16 June 1924 – 26 December 1924	Succeeded by Iliaz Vrioni
