= June Revolution =

Coup in Albania

- Part of the Interwar period
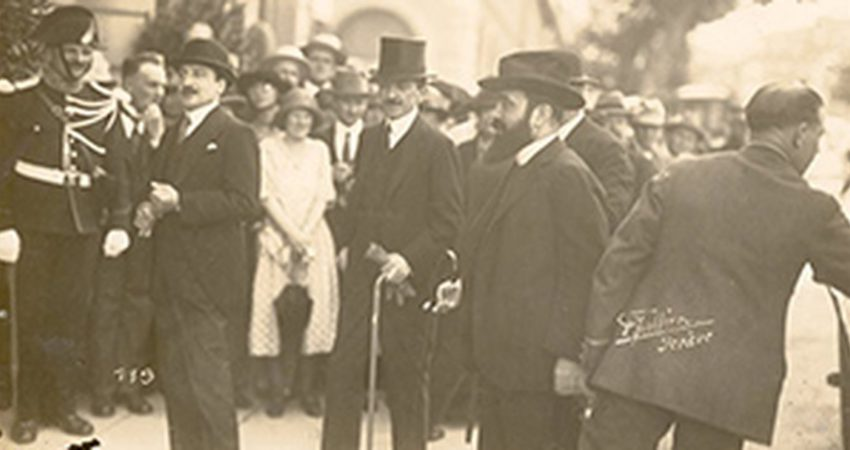
- Fan Noli in Tirana after taking power
Date	June 1924
Location	Albania
Result	Noli victory: Exile of Ahmet Zogu; Fan Noli becomes the Prime Minister of Albania; Six months later Zogu with Great Powers and Yugoslav support would coup the government

Belligerents
Noli Supporters: The Kachaks; Kelmendi tribesmen; Tribesmen from Dibër; Chetas from Southern Albania	Government of Albania: Mati tribesmen; (Russia) White Army Royal Yugoslav Army

Commanders and leaders
Fan Noli; Riza Cerova; Bajram Curri; Luigj Gurakuqi; Elez Isufi; Hasan Prishtina; Llazar Bozo	(Albania) Ahmet Zogu (Albania) Ceno Kryeziu (Albania) Osman Gazep (Albania) Iliaz Vrioni (Russia) Ilja Miklashevsky

Units involved
Kachaks; Cheta of Dishnicë; Volunteers from Lushnjë, Skrapari, Përmet and Vlora	Albanian Armed Forces

Strength
Unknown	117 soldiers

Casualties and losses
- 26 killed, 50 wounded

The June Revolution (Albanian: Lëvizja e Qershorit) was a popular uprising in Albania that temporarily overthrew the Zogist regime following the 1923 Albanian parliamentary election and the assassination of popular Albanian activist and politician Avni Rustemi. A new government was established under Fan Noli that sought to implement a series of radical and liberal reforms, much to the dismay of Albania's traditional landowning class, and Ahmet Zogu would return to power after staging a counter-coup six months later with the help of the Kingdom of Yugoslavia.

== Background ==
=== Zog's rise to power ===
Albanian chieftain and politician Ahmet Zogu, or simply 'Zog', who would come to establish an authoritarian regime over Albania, had become increasingly involved in the Albanian political scene since after the establishment of Independent Albania in 1912. An opportunist with a lack of concern for political scruples, Zog fought both for and against the Turks, the Austro-Hungarians, Prince William of Wied, Essad Pasha Toptani and the Serbs to advance his own political aspirations.

Zog had come to take an important position in Albanian politics during the Congress of Lushnjë, which resulted in the establishment of a temporary government that would function as an important foundational development in the new post-World War I Albanian state. Although the congress resulted in the presidency of Sulejman Delvina, Zogu and Aqif Pasha Elbasani were actually the dominant political figures, and the new capital of Tirana was also conveniently situated near Zog's powerbase in the Mati region of north-central Albania. Zog was named Minister of the Interior in Delvina's cabinet, taking control of the police and the gendarmerie as well as establishing himself as commander-in-chief of the Albanian armed forces. The armed forces were completely lacklustre, save for Zog's personal retainer of around 2,000 fellow tribesmen. Albanian politics continued to be dominated by the traditional landowning aristocracy, and this ruling class of conservatives was determined to maintain the traditional system of landownership, meaning that Albania was the only country in Europe that was still primarily feudal. This gave rise to a political conflict between the conservatives and the progressives, which consisted primarily of the marginalised Catholic and Orthodox minorities, Kosovo Albanians and careerists.

With his new role, Zog engineered the fall of Delvina's government and established a clique whose primary purposes were to oppose those in power and acquire wealth and power for its own members by any means available. The clique destroyed the next government, which was led by Ilias Vrioni, and Zog settled for a military command under Pandeli Evangjeli's new regime in 1921. Evangjeli was deposed by Aqif Pasha Elbasani, who installed Kosovo Albanian politician Hasan Prishtina as the new prime minister. Prishtina and Elbasani were deposed by Zog after only 5 days following Zog's march on Tirana and his encirclement of the city. In December alone, four different cabinets were formed in the span of 18 days. Zog appointed a puppet - Xhafer Bey Ypi - in Prishtina's place whilst consolidating his own political position, while rising political figure Fan Noli was named Minister of Foreign Affairs due to his proven skill and success as a diplomat and foreign contacts. As Minister of the Interior, Zog brought increasing internal stability at the cost of increasing authoritarianism.

Zog's divided opponents were brought together by the cumulative effect of nearly two years of his rule, which only underlined the vast problems of the nation that still required solutions. The Western-educated Albanian intelligentsia feared Zog as an undereducated and unscrupulous man prone to despotism, whilst the Kosovo Albanians did not appreciate his lack of enthusiasm in supporting Albanian irredentist movements in Kosovo. Zog did not consider Kosovo to be an important issue and prioritised a normalisation of relations with the Yugoslavs over support for the Committee for the National Defence of Kosovo, which he considered to be a significant obstacle. The Kosovo Committee, which pushed for the unification of Kosovo with Albania, viewed Zog as the second coming of his distant relative Essad Pasha Toptani, a leader who was always willing to collaborate with the Serbs in return for political support. Essad Pasha was an ally to the Yugoslavs, and Zog had quickly assumed that role. This left Zog with the traditional, landowning feudal beys of central and southern Albania and a handful of northern chieftains as his only means of support in Albania. He established closer ties with prominent beys and gave the chieftains important roles in the military, paying them on a regular basis to stop them from attacking his new government. Zog had these chieftains swear loyalty to him instead of the Albanian state, but the Kosovo Albanians and other irredentist elements could not be so easily bought. Nonetheless, legislative achievements were meagre as parliament was continuously stalled by the conflicts between the progressive party and the Zog-dominated popular party.

As Minister of the Interior, Zog attempted to disarm the highlander tribes that he deemed as threats to his position, as well as the Albanians aligned with the Kosovo Committee. Zog's program of disarmament was selective, as he did not try to disarm his allies in the Mati region, and Zog's political opponents were convinced that he had undertaken the attempt at the behest of Yugoslav agents who sought to eliminate Albanian support for the Albanians of Kosovo. This culminated in a revolt in March 1922. The tribes - led by Bajram Curri, Hasan Prishtina and Elez Isufi - marched on Tirana, and even though Zog would have most certainly been overwhelmed, the attempt was unsuccessful following the intervention of the British minister Harry Eyres, who convinced the rebels to withdraw. For his part, Fan Noli resigned from his position as Minister of Foreign Affairs, citing Zog's dictatorial tendencies and his reactionary policies. Zog established a military court and hastily dispatched 32 of the rebel leaders as Xhafer Ypi, Zog's personal puppet, was reconstituted as prime minister. Ypi, who was extremely incompetent and severely lacking in intelligence, had once again begun to lose control of the country, prompting Zog to step in and replace Ypi as prime minister in December 1922 whilst retaining the position of Minister of the Interior.

=== 1923 elections ===
As prime minister, Zogu's primary goal was to remain in power and establish a more authoritarian state to end the political chaos in Albania, and with the support of the landowning beys, Zog attempted to eliminate the republican political elements within the state. Zog's personal conflicts with the Kosovo Albanian leaders made him a fierce opponent of the Kosovo Albanians and the Kachak Movement, and his rise to power resulted in the end of Albanian governmental support for Kosovo.

In January 1923, Curri and Prishtina led another unsuccessful attempt at overthrowing Zog, and in between the two unsuccessful attempts of 1922 and 1923, Zog entered into a secret agreement with the Yugoslavs in which he promised to destroy the Kachak bands, among other things. In that same month, Zog's forces, in coordination with the Yugoslavs, invaded the Neutral Zone of Junik; the Kachaks left the zone and moved further into Kosovo, and the area was ceded to the Yugoslavs. The lack of support for the Kachaks was due to both the reactionary and anti-democratic policies of Zog and his supporters, and also due to the fact that the Neutral Zone of Junik, which functioned as a powerbase for the Kachaks, represented a possible threat to Albania's security regarding a possible invasion from Yugoslavia. The Yugoslavs enabled Zog's rise to power by destabilising Albania's internal political situation, allowing them to win over individual northern Albanian tribal leaders and to advance their own objectives, particularly those regarding Kosovo. Ultimately, international pressure and the lack of governmental support from Albania are the primary reasons for the failure of the Kachak Movement in Kosovo.

Elections for a constituent assembly were finally called in the summer of 1923, with the first round of voting to be held in September and the second in December. This election was to also decide the structure of the state, as the constituent assembly was to function as both a parliament and as a body in charge of drafting a new constitution to replace the statutes outlined in the Congress of Lushnjë. Once this agenda had been filled, the assembly was expected to resign before new elections were held for a regular parliament. Fan Noli, who had entered a self-imposed exile, re-entered Albanian politics to run against Zog, founding the Liberal Party in Korçë in September 1923 and establishing himself as the leading figure among the southern anti-Zogist progressives. The political scene, which had been dominated by the Popular and Progressive parties since the 1921 elections, began to diversify with the rise of new movements; reformist groups from the south and Catholic factions from the region of Shkodër established new political formations aimed at reducing the influence of the old party structures. Zog chose not to align himself with these groups and instead continued to champion himself as the only guarantor of national stability.

Zog's progressive opponents, which consisted of Avni Rustemi's Bashkimi movement, Vatra supporters from the Albanian diaspora and former Popular party members, were unified as a result of their hostility to Zog's increasing dominance, ultimately campaigning together as the Opposition Party. This was a coalition of Noli's Liberals, the Gjirokastër-based Democrats, the Vlorë-based National Democrats and Ora e Malëve from Shkodër. Bashkimi did not put forward candidates as they technically were not a political party, but their leader, Avni Rustemi, ran as a candidate for the prefecture of Kosovo (Kukës). Regionalism was possibly the greatest cause for the lack of unity between these groups, as the Opposition Party was a collection of different parties that lacked support beyond their religious or regional bases. Deep-seated differences among the progressives proved to be the major obstacle in removing Zog from power, as these groups had only appeared with the call for the 1923 elections and maintained only superficial influence.

Noli and the progressives viewed the system of indirect voting as a significant disadvantage and attempted to impose a new electoral law that would override the electoral regulations. Viewing this as the only way to counter Zog's path to dictatorship, the progressives argued that direct voting was more democratic and would lead to a more representative assembly, eliminating the opportunities for corruption and fraud that would be inherent in a second round of voting. The progressives also sought to expand the role of women in the government and to curb the political influence of the military and gendarmerie, as well as amnesties for those in charge of the rebellion in March 1922. However, Zogu and his supporters rejected these democratic efforts and refused to make concessions, resulting in the electoral law's failure to pass in a parliamentary vote.

A fierce election campaign ensued in which Noli and the progressives preached Westernisation, modernisation and democratisation. Noli's Liberals advocated for the "retention of the four-man regency council, universal voting rights in secret, full independence of the judiciary, a constitution that guaranteed fundamental freedoms of speech, press and property, constitutional guarantees against dictatorship, occidental [Western] ... administration and a simplification of the government bureaucracy". They felt that the type of government for the nation - be it a republic or a monarchy - should be decided by the people in a referendum. Likewise, the Democrats - represented by some of Albania's leading progressives, such as Avni Rustemi - possessed a similar agenda, stressing the need for vigorous agrarian reform and anti-monarchism. The Shkodër-based 'Ora e Malëve' remained pro-monarchist and felt loyal to Prince William of Wied, but since they were a Catholic organisation, their influence did not exceed regional bounds.

Noli's campaign was focused in the disaffected southern districts of Korçë and Gjirokastër. He strongly criticized the government, invoking Western democratic ideals and denouncing Zog’s claims of modernization, instead insisting that Zog's mindset remained fundamentally oriental. He emphasized his party's goal to uplift the people rather than to subjugate them, promising respect for liberty, transparency in financial governance and a rejection of corruption and excessive taxation. On the other hand, Zog's power base lied in the northeast, where his tribal loyalties ran deep, and in the central lowlands, which was dominated by the traditional landowning elites. His message of stability over reform resonated in these regions. Zog considered Noli to be a serious and concerning threat, and the Interior Ministry closely monitored the Opposition's southern campaign.

Claims of electoral fraud were made against Zog, but the primary issue seemed to be the funding and interference from external parties - Zog was most probably funded by Yugoslavia, Greece and Italy, in contrast to Noli, who was funded by the Vatra organisation thanks to the efforts of Faik Konica. Ultimately, both parties failed to secure a majority, and after the second round of voting in December had concluded, the Opposition managed to obtain 39 seats, whilst Zog secured 44 seats, some of which belonged people who were not devout Zogists and needed convincing to join Zog's party. Using his connections, Zog managed to rally the support of some of the remaining landowning independent beys who believed that he would keep their privileges intact. This allowed him to secure a majority and thereby retain his position as prime minister. The Opposition party were outraged at the results and argued that their impressive showing in the first round should have ended with them receiving a majority vote by the second, claiming that indirect voting had cheated them of their victory.

=== Rising tensions and assassinations ===
The assembly that convened on 21 January 1924 neglected the mandate for a new constitution, and Zog's attempts at centralisation at the cost of regional and personal independence only served to unite his opponents. Zog's most active opponents still included the Kosovo Albanians, as well as an increasing number of influential military and police personnel, which caused a cabinet crisis. In an attempt to buy himself more time, Zog compromised by resigning from his post as Interior Minister whilst retaining the position of prime minister, and incorporated members of the opposition into his cabinet.

On 23 February 1924, an unsuccessful assassination attempt was carried out against Zog as he walked up the steps of parliament. He was shot several times by Beqir Valteri, a youth from Mati who was trying to exact revenge on Zog as part of a blood feud. Nonetheless, even though the assassination was an attempt at personal revenge, Zog framed it as a political act undertaken by a member of Avni Rustemi's Bashkimi organisation. Zog resigned as prime minister to supposedly recover from his wounds, appointing his prospective father-in-law and ally Shefqet Vërlaci in his place. Yet again, the new cabinet failed to include members of the Opposition and exclusively represented the interests of the landowning beys, resulting in the Opposition denouncing this cabinet as little more than a tool for Zog. Zog's reasons for resignation went beyond recovery; he opted out of power to avoid being associated with the nation's growing financial crisis and general unrest, hoping to return when the situation was most desperate so as to position himself yet again as the nation's saviour.

Discontent grew across the nation, which was undergoing a famine and a financial crisis that only exacerbated the hostility of the populace to Vërlaci's cabinet. Military leaders, who were vital in keeping the Zogists in power, began to turn on the government, which could no longer afford to pay them, and their financial situation continuously embarrassed them on the global stage as their diplomats and representatives could not even afford to sustain themselves. Zog wished to create chaos within the nation so that he may declare a state of emergency that would allow him to deal with the Opposition once and for all. Two Americans were soon murdered on Albanian soil, and although the culprits were unidentified, many suspected the involvement of Zog or Albania's hostile neighbours, and this situation only served to heighten the growing tensions within the country.

Tensions continued to rise until 20 April, when Avni Rustemi himself was shot in Tirana and eventually died from his wounds. The majority of scholars agree that Zog had ordered Rustemi's assassination. Rustemi's funeral was held in Vlorë on 30 April and attended by around 10,000 people, as well as 26 members of the national assembly and members of Rustemi's Bashkimi organisation. Multiple speeches denouncing Zogist influence in Albania and the pro-Zogist regime were made, including by Fan Noli himself, and they provoked the opposition into an all-out uprising. The Opposition blamed Zog for Rustemi's death and decided to overthrow the Zogist government by force if necessary, resulting in protests and eventually a revolution.

== Events ==
The uprising was split into two fronts: the Northern Front organized by the Committee of Kosovo and led by Bajram Curri which supported Noli due to the rivalry between them and the government of Zogu, and the southern front which was led by Riza Cerova. The uprising was strongly supported by Albanian peasants. The Albanian peasantry appeared diverse. Part of them dreamed of owning a piece of land or expanding the small amount of land they owned. The rest wanted to be freed from heavy and numerous state obligations, such as the tithe, the jalap tax, the slavery tax, and other wastes of the feudal system. The Southern Front was composed of the Përmet garrison and volunteers from Skrapar. Following several Skirmishes against the government forces, Riza Cerova leading an armed group of ~120 men would take over Berat and would make his way to Tirana. In Kozare he encountered Osman Gazep who was sent from Tirana with a battalion to suppress the uprising. Following the Battle of Kozare, Cerova defeated the Government forces and occupied Lushnje. In Lushnje, he was attacked by Osman's forces again but managed to defeat them. Around this time, the Vlora volunteers arrived to assist the uprising. With all of the southern forces, the rebels would occupy Tirana as Ahmet Zogu fled to Yugoslavia. According to US estimates, 20 people were killed and 35 were injured on the northern front, while 6 people were killed and 15 were injured on the southern front.

== Aftermath ==
Following the occupation of Tirana on June 10, Fan Noli became the Prime Minister on June 16. Noli, an idealist, rejected demands for new elections on the grounds that Albania needed a "paternal" government. Noli's coalition proposed his "Twenty Points Program" that would see the implementation of radical reforms in Albania. Fan Noli as politician had left-wing views based on collectivism, egalitarianism and nationalism but all of them failed. He also failed to gather the financial support that was necessary to implement it. The United States, United Kingdom and other European countries did not recognize Noli's government and they kept affairs only with Soviet Union that under Joseph Stalin. The Yugoslav kingdom also became alarmed at the established relations between Albania and the Soviet Union.

On 13 December 1924, Ahmet Zogu led an army of 1,000 Dibran and Matjan tribesmen with White Russian volunteers financed by Belgrade into Albania. Noli's supporters clashed with them where Elez Isufi a famous highlander tribesman from Dibra as Noli's supporter got injured during fighting in Peshkopi and died later. On Christmas Eve, Zog's forces reclaimed the capital, and Noli fled to Italy. Noli's government only lasted for six months. The exiled members of the revolution went on to form KONARE.
