= Deputy Prime Minister of Albania =

Position in the Albanian government

Deputy Prime Minister of Republic of Albania
- Zëvëndëskryeministri i Shqipërisë

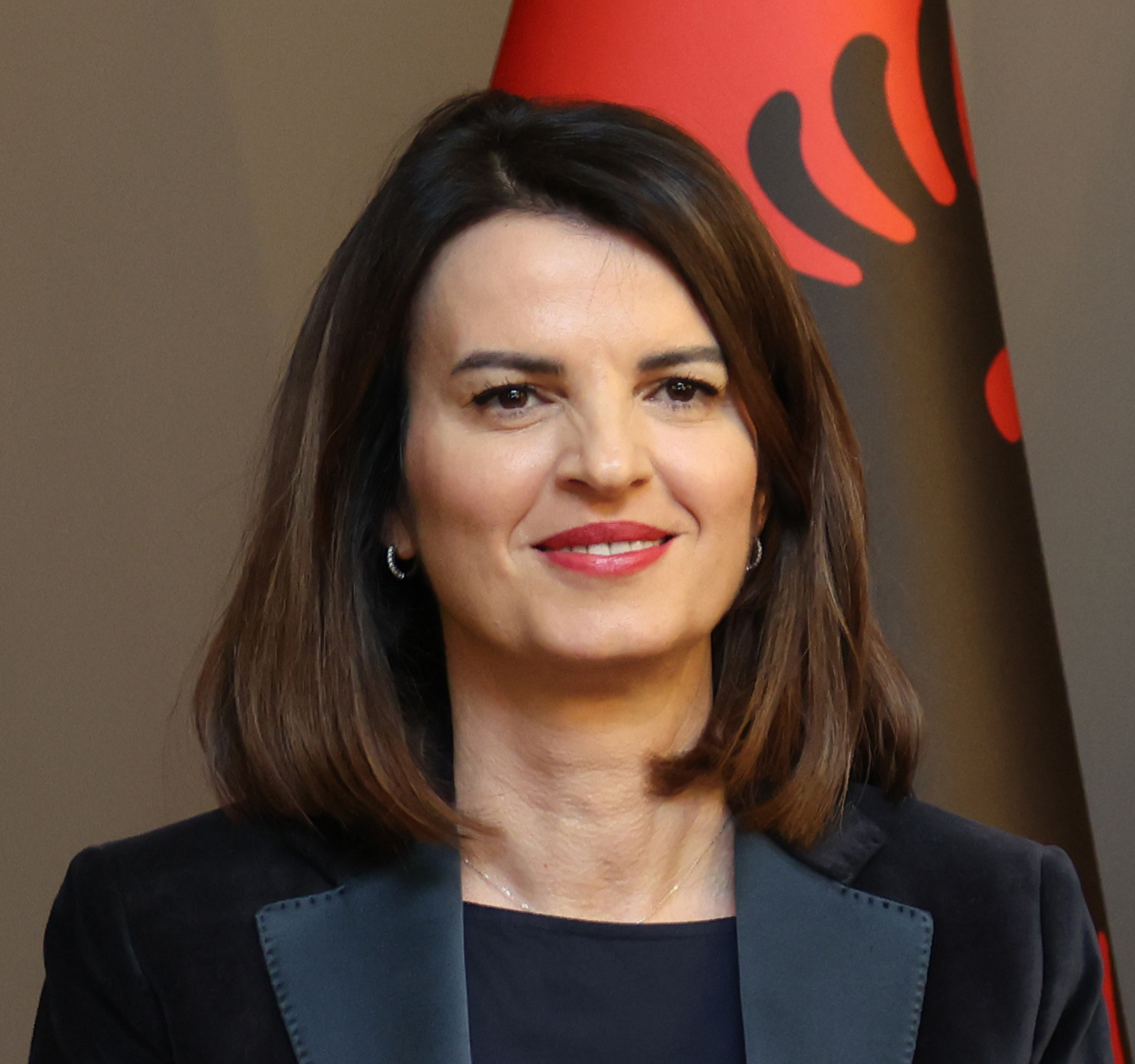
- Incumbent; Albana Koçiu since 26 February 2026
- Appointer: President
- Inaugural holder: Nikollë Kaçorri
- Formation: 29 November 1912
- Website: kryeministria.al

The deputy prime minister of Albania (Albanian: Zëvendëskryeministri i Shqipërise), officially styled the deputy prime minister of the Republic of Albania (Albanian: Zëvendëskryeministri i Republikës së Shqipërisë), is the deputy head of government of Albania. In the absence of the prime minister, the deputy prime minister takes over the functions of chairman of the council of ministers. The office is the second senior minister of the cabinet in the executive branch of the government in the parliamentary system in the Republic of Albania.

Although Albania has always had a deputy prime minister since its independence in 1912. A prime minister may choose not to appoint a deputy prime minister. As per the Constitution of Albania, the president of Albania appoints the deputy prime minister and swears before starting duties in front of the President. The deputy prime minister can take the position of acting prime minister, when the prime minister is temporarily absent or incapable of exercising its executive power. The deputy prime minister is often asked to succeed the prime minister's term of office, following the prime minister's sudden death or unexpected resignation. However, that is not necessarily mandated by the Constitution of the nation.

== Officeholders (1912–present) ==
Since the inception of the Fourth Republic, nineteen individuals have occupied the post. The shortest-serving deputy premier was Pali Miska, lasting for 2 months between 22 December 1990 and 22 February 1991. The longest-serving deputy prime minister was Niko Peleshi, who held the deputy premiership continuously from 15 September 2013 to 22 May 2017. of the officeholders after the fall of communism in Albania:

No.	Name	Term in office	
1	Nikoll Kaçorri	4 December 1912	30 March 1913
2	Prenk Bib Doda	30 March 1913	25 December 1913
–	Prenk Bib Doda	25 December 1918	29 January 1920
3	Eshref Frashëri	30 January 1920	14 November 1920
4	Iljas Agushi	12 February 1943	10 September 1943
5	Myslim Peza	23 October 1944	21 March 1946
6	Koçi Xoxe	22 March 1946	1 October 1948
7	Mehmet Shehu	23 November 1948	19 July 1954
8	Spiro Koleka	17 November 1949	31 July 1953
9	Tuk Jakova	5 July 1950	31 July 1953
10	Hysni Kapo	5 July 1950	31 July 1953
11	Spiro Pano	5 July 1950	4 March 1951
12	Manush Myftiu	5 July 1950	9 April 1952
13	Gogo Nushi	6 September 1951	31 July 1953
14	Bedri Spahiu	10 April 1952	31 July 1953
15	Beqir Balluku	19 July 1954	28 October 1974
–	Manush Myftiu	19 July 1954	16 March 1966
–	Tuk Jakova	19 July 1954	21 June 1955
16	Koço Theodhosi	21 June 1955	16 March 1966
–	Gogo Nushi	4 June 1956	3 June 1958
–	Spiro Koleka	4 June 1956	16 March 1966
17	Abdyl Këllezi	4 June 1956	16 March 1966
18	Haki Toska	17 March 1966	18 November 1970
19	Adil Çarçani	17 March 1966	18 December 1981
–	Spiro Koleka	19 November 1970	11 November 1976
20	Xhafer Spahiu	19 November 1970	26 December 1978
–	Abdyl Këllezi	28 October 1974	11 November 1976
21	Petro Dode	28 October 1974	26 December 1978
–	Manush Myftiu	12 November 1976	7 July 1990
22	Pali Miska	12 November 1976	June 1982
23	Qirjako Mihali	27 December 1978	23 November 1982
24	Besnik Bekteshi	23 November 1982	2 February 1989
25	Hekuran Isai	20 February 1987	21 February 1991
26	Vangjel Çërrava	20 February 1987	1 February 1989
–	Pali Miska	2 February 1989	21 February 1991
27	Simon Stefani	2 February 1989	7 July 1990
–	Hekuran Isai	8 July 1990	21 February 1991
28	Fatos Nano	31 January 1991	21 February 1991
29	Shkëlqim Cani	31 January 1991	21 February 1991
–	Shkëlqim Cani	22 February 1991	4 June 1991
30	Gramoz Pashko	11 June 1991	6 December 1991
31	Zyhdi Pepa	11 June 1991	13 April 1992
32	Abdyl Xhaja	18 December 1991	13 April 1992
33	Bashkim Kopliku	13 April 1992	3 December 1994
34	Rexhep Uka	13 April 1992	6 August 1993
35	Dashamir Shehi	4 December 1994	10 July 1996
36	Dylber Vrioni	4 December 1994	10 July 1996
37	Tritan Shehu	11 July 1996	1 March 1997
38	Bashkim Fino	25 July 1997	28 September 1998
39	Ilir Meta	2 October 1998	25 October 1999
40	Makbule Çeço	28 October 1999	6 September 2001
41	Skënder Gjinushi	6 September 2001	25 July 2002
–	Ilir Meta	29 July 2002	29 December 2003
42	Ermelinda Meksi	29 July 2002	29 December 2003
43	Namik Dokle	29 December 2003	1 September 2005
44	Ilir Rusmali	9 September 2005	10 September 2009
–	Ilir Meta	16 September 2009	10 September 2013
45	Niko Peleshi	15 September 2013	21 May 2017
46	Ledina Mandia	22 May 2017	11 September 2017
47	Senida Mesi	13 September 2017	17 January 2019
48	Erion Braçe	17 January 2019	18 September 2021
49	Arben Ahmetaj	18 September 2021	28 July 2022
50	Belinda Balluku	28 July 2022	26 February 2026
51	Albana Koçiu	26 February 2026	Incumbent

== See also ==
- Politics of Albania
- Council of Ministers of Albania
- Prime Minister of Albania
