= 6th Congress of the Party of Labour of Albania =

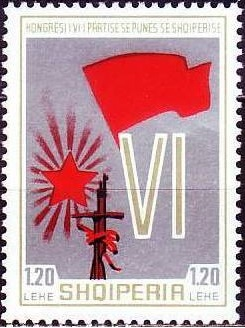
Albanian postage stamp, commemorating the 6th party congress

The 6th Congress of the Party of Labour of Albania was held in Tirana 1–7 November 1971. The party congress coincided with the 30th foundation anniversary of the party.

== Agenda and proceedings ==
The congress was held at the Palace of Culture of Tirana. Upon opening the congress, the delegates elected a congress presidium, credentials committee and congress secretariat. The congress adopted an agenda with four main agenda points; report on the activity of the Central Committee of the Party, presented by First Secretary of the Central Committee Enver Hoxha, report on the work of the party Central Control and Auditing Commission presented by Control and Auditing Commission chairman Ibrahim Sina, report by Politburo Member Mehmet Shehu on the directives for the fifth five-year plan, followed by elections to the central leadership structures of the party.

Following the speeches by Hoxha and Sina, 39 delegates addressed the plenary. Afterwards Hoxha's and Sina's reports were approved unanimously. Following Shehu's report on the five-year plan, 25 delegates addressed the plenary after which the report was approved unanimously. All elections to leadership bodies were done unanimously.

The congress concluded on 7 November 1971. Hoxha held a concluding speech, after which The Internationale was played.

== Documents and decisions ==
The 6th party congress adopted directives for the fifth five-year plan. The directives called for the transformation of Albania from an agrarian-industrial to an industrial-agrarian country. In December the National Assembly adopted the fifth five-year plan, based on the directives of the 6th party congress.

The 6th congress adopted a decision to replace the constitution of the People's Republic of Albania. The subsequent 7th party congress, held in 1976, adopted a new constitution which declared Albania as a socialist state.

== Central Committee ==
The 6th congress elected a Central Committee with 71 full members and 39 alternate members. Following the congress, the following Politburo was elected; Ramiz Alia, Beqir Balluku, Adil Çarçani, Kadri Hazbiu, Enver Hoxha, Hysni Kapo, Abdyl Këllezi, Spiro Koleka, Rita Marko, Manush Myftiu, Mehmet Shehu, Haki Toska, Koço Theodhosi, with the following candidate members Pirro Dodbiba, Petrit Dume, Pilo Peristeri and Xhafer Spahiu.

== Central Control and Auditing Commission ==
The 6th congress elected a new 21-member Central Control and Auditing Commission, with Ibrahim Sina as chairman and Gafur Cuci and Hajdar Aranitasi as vice chairmen.

== Foreign guests ==
Foreign delegations (delegation heads in brackets) at the congress included the Workers Party of Vietnam (Nguyễn Văn Trân), the National Liberation Front of South Vietnam (Prof. Nguyễn Văn Hiệu), the Communist Party of Australia (Marxist-Leninist) (E. Hill), the Communist Party of New Zealand (Vic Wilcox), the Communist Party of Indonesia (Jusuf Ajitorop), the Communist Party of Poland (Kazimierz Mijal), the Communist Party of Malaya, the Communist Party of Brazil, the Communist Party of Italy (Marxist-Leninist) (Fosco Dinucci), the Communist Party of Peru (Rafael Kaline), the Marxist-Leninist Communist Party of France (Jean Ferre), the Communist Party of Britain (Marxist-Leninist) (Reg Birch), the Communist Party of Japan (Left) (Takayuki Anasako), the Revolutionary Communist Party of Chile (Ernesto González), the Communist Party of Spain (Marxist-Leninist) (Raúl Marco), the Communist Party of Ceylon (M.C.N. Shafi), the Marxist-Leninist Communist Party of Ecuador (Alfonso Jaramillo), the Sudanese Communist Party (Revolutionary Leadership) ('Xhabir'), the Marxist-Leninist Party of Austria (Franz Strobl), the Communist Party of Germany/Marxist-Leninist (Ernst Aust), the Marxist-Leninist Party of the Netherlands ('Chris Petersen'), the Marxist-Leninist Communist League of Sweden (Kurt Lundgren), Marxist-Leninist Communist Party of Belgium (Fernand Lefebvre), the Communist Vanguard of Argentina, the Marxist-Leninist Communist League of Denmark (Benito Scocozza) and the Marxist-Leninist Groups of Norway (Sigurd Allern).

Notably there was no representation of the Chinese Communist Party at the congress. Reportedly the Chinese ambassador to Tirana Liu Zhenhua was occupied touring the country with a Chinese electricity group. Nevertheless, the Chinese Communist Party, along with the Communist Party of Burma, the Workers' Party of Korea and the Communist Party of Thailand, sent written messages that were read up to the congress delegates.

== Documentary ==
A 90-minute documentary, 30 vjet PPSH, Kongresi VI i PPSh ('30 years of the PPSh, VI Congress of PPSh'), was produced from the party congress by Kinostudio Shqiperia e Re.
