= Ministry of Industry and Mines (Albania) =

Former government ministry of Albania

- Ministria e Industrisë dhe Minierave

Department overview
- Formed: 12 February 1943
- Dissolved: 10 September 2005
- Superseding Department: Ministry of Economy, Trade and Energy
- Jurisdiction: Council of Ministers
- Status: Dissolved
- Headquarters: Tirana, Albania

The Ministry of Industry and Mines (Albanian: Ministria e Industrisë dhe Minierave) was a department of the Government of Albania responsible for the proposal and execution of government policies on the country's industry and the promotion and defence of industrial property.

Currently, the duties of this department are exercised by the Ministry of Infrastructure and Energy.

== History ==
From the creation of the Albanian state in 1912, this department was included under the Ministry of Economy and did not enjoy any special importance because the Albanian industry at that time was very underdeveloped. However, it gained importance during the period of the second Albanian kingdom under King Zog I, when investments with foreign capital, especially Italian ones, began to increase in the oil industry.

However, for the first time this department was established during the period of occupation of the country by fascist Italy, where under the puppet government of Maliq Bushati the Ministry of Industry and Trade was established on 12 February 1943. Zef Shiroka was appointed Minister of State of Industry and Trade.

=== Reorganization ===
Throughout history, the department has sometimes served as a separate ministry or as the main department, and sometimes as an integral part of a ministry with several departments. The last time the name of the department was included under the name of the relevant ministry was in the Nano's government (2002–2005) where it was part of the Ministry of Industry and Energy and its minister was Viktor Doda. Since then this department has been under the competence of the Ministry of Infrastructure and Energy.

- Ministry of Industry and Trade (1943)
- Ministry of Industry (1948–1953)
- Ministry of Industry and Construction (1953–1954)
- Ministry of Industry and Mining (1954–1959)
- Ministry of Industry (1959–1966)
- Ministry of Industry and Mining (1966–1991)
- Ministry of Industry, Mines and Energy (1991)
- Ministry of Mines and Energy Resources (1991)
- Ministry of Industry (1991)
- Ministry of Industry, Mining and Energy Resources (1991–1993)
- Ministry of Industry and Trade (1993–1994)
- Ministry of Industry, Transport and Trade (1994–1997)
- Ministry of Industry and Energy (2002–2005)
- Ministry of Energy and Industry (2013–2017)

== Officeholders (1943–2005) ==
No.	Name	Term in office
Ministers of Industry (1943–2005)
1	Zef Shiroka	12 February 1943	28 April 1943
2	Nexhip Basha	11 May 1943	10 September 1943
3	Gogo Nushi	23 November 1948	29 October 1949
4	Abedin Shehu	29 October 1949	8 March 1950
5	Rita Marko	5 July 1950	5 March 1951
6	Adil Çarçani	5 March 1951	31 July 1953
7	Spiro Koleka	1 August 1953	19 July 1954
8	Xhafer Spahiu	25 December 1959	16 March 1966
9	Vilson Ahmeti	11 May 1991	4 June 1991
10	Jordan Misja	11 June 1991	6 December 1991
11	Iljaz Mehmeti	18 December 1991	13 April 1992
12	Selim Belortaja	9 November 1993	3 December 1994
13	Albert Brojka	4 December 1994	16 August 1995
14	Suzana Panariti	16 August 1995	1 March 1997
15	Foto Dhuka	11 March 1997	24 July 1997
16	Viktor Doda	22 February 2002	10 September 2005
Ministers of Mines (1953–1997)
1	Spiro Koleka	1 August 1953	19 July 1954
2	Zenel Hamiti	5 July 1950	27 November 1951
3	Shefqet Peçi	27 November 1951	31 July 1953
4	Adil Çarçani	25 December 1959	28 December 1965
–	Zenel Hamiti	28 December 1965	16 March 1966
5	Drini Mezini	11 May 1991	6 December 1991
6	Abdyl Xhaja	18 December 1991	13 April 1992
–	Abdyl Xhaja	4 December 1994	1 March 1997
7	Kastriot Shtylla	11 March 1997	24 July 1997
Ministers of Industry and Mines (1954–1993)
1	Koço Theodhosi	20 July 1954	21 June 1955
–	Adil Çarçani	21 June 1955	25 December 1959
–	Koço Theodhosi	17 March 1966	29 Maj 1975
2	Pali Miska	29 Maj 1975	12 Nentor 1976
–	Xhafer Spahiu	12 Nentor 1976	26 April 1980
3	Prokop Murra	26 April 1980	27 March 1981
4	Llambi Gegprifti	27 March 1981	23 November 1982
–	Hajredin Çeliku	23 November 1982	19 February 1987
–	Llambi Gegprifti	20 February 1987	1 February 1989
5	Besnik Bekteshi	2 February 1989	21 February 1991
–	Drini Mezini	22 February 1991	10 May 1991
–	Abdyl Xhaja	13 April 1992	23 November 1993
Ministers of Energy and Industry (2013–2017)
1	Damian Gjiknuri	15 September 2013	13 September 2017

== Notes ==
- The title "Substitutive" (gheg albanian: Zavëndësisht), often using the acronym "Zav.", references to the temporary exercise of duty by an official who was not formally appointed by the prime minister but occupied the interim role of the vacant minister. These officials are labeled in the list with an asterisk.

== Sources ==
- Dervishi, Kastriot [in Albanian] (2005), Historia e shtetit shqiptar 1912–2005: organizimi shtetëror, jeta politike, ngjarjet kryesore, të gjithë ligjvënësit, ministrat dhe kryetarët e shtetit shqiptar në historinë 93-vjeçare të tij (in Albanian), Shtëpia Botuese 55, OCLC 123286739
