= Xhafer Spahiu =

Albanian politician (1923–1999)

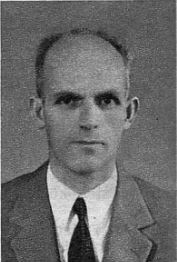

Minister of Industry and Mines
- In office 13 November 1976 – 26 April 1980
- Prime Minister: Mehmet Shehu
- Preceded by: Pali Miska
- Succeeded by: Prokop Murra

Deputy Prime Minister
- In office 23 November 1970 – 13 November 1976 Serving with Beqir Balluku, Adil Çarçani, Spiro Koleka, Abdyl Këllezi, and Petro Dode
- Prime Minister: Mehmet Shehu
- Preceded by: Haki Toska

Personal details
- Born: 5 June 1923 Gjakova, Yugoslavia (now Kosovo)
- Died: 19 May 1999 (aged 75) Tirana, Albania
- Party: Albanian Party of Labour

Military service
- Allegiance: National Liberation Movement
- Battles/wars: World War II; World War II in Albania
- Central institution membership: ?–?: Candidate member, Central Committee; 1961–1970: Full member, Central Committee; 1971–1976: Candidate member, 6th Politburo; 1958–1991: Member, People's Assembly of Albania (Durrës District)

Xhafer Spahiu (5 June 1923 – 19 May 1999) was an Albanian politician of the Albanian Party of Labour (PPSh). He was the only Kosovar Albanian of the higher ranks of the Communist Albania leadership after 1948.

== Life ==
Spahiu was born in Gjakova, Kosovo, at that time part of the Kingdom of Yugoslavia. He was one of the many communist Kosovo Albanians who came from the same town, such as Emin Duraku, Fadil Hoxha, Sadik Stavaleci, Elham Nimani, etc. During World War II he was part of the guerrilla movement in Albania in charge of the information and communications to the public. As such in 1944 he was arrested and sent to the Nazi concentration camp in Pristina. After his release, he went to Tirana, Albania.

In 1945, one of his brothers, the great patriot Halim Spahiu was arrested, jailed and killed by the Yugoslav Communist authorities because of his political views against Yugoslav regime and especially for being in favor of uniting Kosova with Albania.

Spahiu was initially a civil servant and among others, from 1957 to 1959, he served as Director of the State Geological Service (Alb: Shërbimi Gjeologjik Shqiptar). While a candidate member of the Central Committee (CC) of the Party, in April 1957 he was next to Enver Hoxha, Mehmet Shehu, Gogo Nushi, Rita Marko, Ramiz Alia, Spiro Koleka, and Behar Shtylla within a delegation visiting the Soviet Union as part of the Albanian-Soviet relationship.

In 1958, he was elected for the first time as representative at the People's Assembly (Alb: Kuvendi Popullor), representing the Durres District. He remained such from the fourth to the end of the eleventh legislative period in 1991. At the 4th Congress of the Party in February 1961, Spahiu was elected a member of the Central Committee.

At the 5th Congress of the Party in November 1966, he became Secretary of the Central Committee and held that post until November 1970. At the same time he was temporarily a member of the Presidium of the People's Assembly, the collective body of counseling for the Presidency. As such, he was one of the members of the Albanian government delegation at the celebrations marking the 20th anniversary of establishing the People's Republic of China.

Subsequently, on 23 November 1970, he became Deputy Chairman of the Council of Ministers in the government of Prime Minister Mehmet Shehu and remained in this position until 13 November 1976. He exchanged his previous post as Central Committee Secretary with Haki Toska, who served as Deputy Prime Minister responsible for agriculture, while dealing mainly with industry.

At the subsequent 6th Party Congress in November 1971, he became a candidate member of the Politburo of the Party of Labour of Albania. He held this function until November 1976. On 13 November 1976 he was appointed Minister of Industry and Mines in the seventh Shehu government, a post he remained in until 26 April 1980.

In April 1985, he was among the participants at the state funeral of the late First Secretary of the PPSh Enver Hoxha.

He was Deputy Chairman of the Presidium of the People's Assembly and thus alongside Rita Marko and Emine Guri one of the counselors of Ramiz Alia.

Spahiu was married to the sister of Reis Malile, former Foreign Minister of Albania.

He died on 19 May 1999 in Tirana.
