= Kiço Mustaqi =

Albanian general and politician (1938–2019)

Minister of Defence
- In office 22 February 1991 – 10 May 1991
- President: Ramiz Alia
- Prime Minister: Fatos Nano
- Preceded by: Prokop Murra
- Succeeded by: Ndriçim Karakaçi

Personal details
- Born: March 22, 1938 Pecë, Sarandë, Albania
- Died: January 24, 2019 (aged 80) Tirana, Albania
- Party: Party of Labour of Albania

Kiço Mustaqi (22 March 1938 – 24 January 2019) was a former Albanian general and politician of the Albanian Party of Labour. He served as Chief of the General Staff of Albanian People's Army, the last Minister of Defence of the communist era in Albania, and was a member of the Politburo.

== Biography ==
Mustaqi was born in Pecë, a village of the Sarandë District (today's Finiq municipality). He was of Greek ethnicity. He left the village at the age of 13, moving initially in Kuçovë to follow the school there, and later entered the Skanderbeg Military High School in Tirana where he graduated as a military officer in 1960, at the eve of the Soviet-Albanian split. He immediately joined the Albanian People's Army, initially serving in a remote military establishment, and then returning to Tirana where he worked for 4 years at the same military school he graduated from. During 1964-1967, he studied at the "Mehmet Shehu Military Academy". He worked in later in Tropojë by the end of 1966, Chief of Staff of the Offensive Brigade and later Commander of the Offensive Brigade in 1968-1969, following in Vau i Dejës as Commander of the Infantry Brigade. In 1974, he became Director of the Military Praparation in the Ministry of Defence. Two years later, Commander of the Military Command of Tirana. Following three years he served as Operative Commander of the Albanian Army, and Deputy Chief of the General Staff of the Albanian Army. In 1982, he became Chief of the General Staff, replacing Veli Llakaj.

In 1974, Mustaqi was selected for the first time as a representative in the People's Assembly as part of the eighth legislative term until the 12th legislature in 1992. During mid-80's, he was appointed First Deputy Minister of Defence. During the 9th Congress of the Party in November 1986, he succeeded as candidate-member of the Politburo of the Party of Labour of Albania, and eventually rose in July 1990 as member of the Politburo, where he remained until June 1991.

On 9 July 1990, he became the successor of Prokop Murra as Minister of Defense in the government of Prime Minister Adil Çarçani. He held this position until 22 February 1991, but was elected again in the successive government of Fatos Nano until May 12, 1991. During this time, he sought in the course of political events and the upcoming collapse of communism to a closer association with the actual military to the political leadership, so as to preserve the power of the Party. However, after emerging riots in February 1991 by the democratic opposition, Mustaqi was replaced by a civilian politician at the same time with the Minister of Internal Affairs Hekuran Isai, of Foreign Affairs Reis Malile, and of Justice Enver Halili. Mustaqi emigrated soon-after in Greece, and worked there simply as a premises security personnel for a private security company in Athens, before returning to Albania together with his two sons.

In June 1996, a special court was brought in Tirana against him (in absence). He was accused of inciting a military coup-d'etat in the Military Academy of Tirana on 22 February 1991. Co-defendants were the commander Arsen Stroka, and the former political commissar of the Military Academy Ksenofon Coni. Allegedly, the defendants were responsible having commanded on 20 February 1991 the students of the Military Academy an intervention against the crackdown on riots that spread after the fall of the statue of Enver Hoxha. Three people were killed while 37 others were injured at that time. In addition, he was accused of corruption and espionage on behalf of Greece. On July 19, 1996, he finally received a prison sentence of five years, which he never served anyway.
