= Pilo Peristeri =

Albanian politician

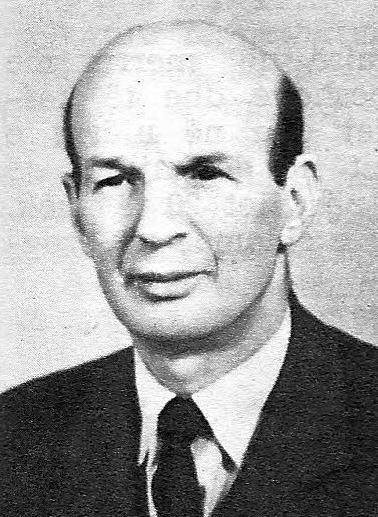

Pilo Peristeri (10 December 1909 – 5 August 2009) was an Albanian politician of the Albanian Party of Labour (PPSh).

== Biography ==
Peristeri was born in Korçë, at that time still part of the Ottoman Empire, to an Albanian family of the Eastern Orthodox rite. Initially, he worked as a tinsmith, and later as a professional soccer player. He was involved with the Communist Group of Korçë, one of the earliest in Albania. He was one of the founding members of the Albanian Communist Party in 1941, and took an active part in World War II as a partisan of the National Liberation Movement (LANC). After the founding of the People's Republic of Albania on 11 January 1946, Peristeri was elected in the People's Assembly (Alb: Kuvendi Popullor) in 1950. He retained this membership until the eleventh legislative period which would end in 1991. He was a representative of the Pogradec District. In addition, he was a member of the Central Committee (CC) of the PPSh.

In 1951 he became the successor of Gogo Nushi as Chairman of the General Council of Albanian Trade Unions (Alb: Bashkimi Sindikal i Shqipërisë, BSSh).

At the 2nd Congress of the PPSh in April 1952, he became a candidate-member of the Politburo of the Party of Labour of Albania. He retained candidate membership within this highest body of the Party leadership until November 1981.

Peristeri was re-confirmed at the 4th Congress of BSSH in February 1955 as the Chairman of the General Council of Trade Unions. On June 22, 1958, he was succeeded by Gogo Nushi. Nevertheless, Peristeri himself remained a member of the Secretariat of BSSh and was also elected chairman of the Party Control Commission of the PPSh. On the 5th Congress of Trade Unions in April 1961, he succeeded as member of the Presidium of the General Council, but withdrew from the Secretariat.

In addition, he was temporarily Deputy Chairman of the Presidium of the People's Assembly, and thus representative of President Haxhi Lleshi. Peristeri, who belonged to the inner circle of the so-called "old guard" of the party, was also a companion of Enver Hoxha, First Secretary of the PPSh, and Prime Minister Mehmet Shehu during business trips in the country, as well as social events.

After retiring from the Politburo, he remained together with Spiro Koleka and Haki Toska as a member of the Central Committee of the Party.

He was the brother-in-law of the Politburo member Manush Myftiu, and was related by marriage to the other Politburo member Rita Marko. He remained influential even after the fall of communism.

Peristeri was in charge of a tractor-production plant in Tirana.
