= Foto Çami =

Albanian academic and politician

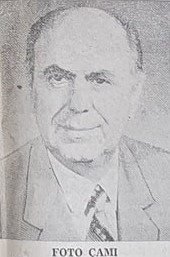

Foto Çami (born 4 October 1925, date of death unknown) was an Albanian academic and politician of Albanian Party of Labour (PPSh).

== Biography ==
Çami was born on 4 October 1925 in the village of Labovë of Gjirokastër District in Albania. He joined the partisans of the National Liberation Movement and served as a political commissar. After World War II he studied philosophy in the University of Tirana. His career in this field would culminate with the honorary title "Professor" (similar to PhD).

Çami was first elected as member of the People's Assembly (Alb: Kuvendi Popullor) in 1970. He held the position until the seventh parliamentary term ending in 1974. He became member of the Central Committee of the Party in 1971.

Çami served for several years as First Secretary of the Party of Tirana District. At the 8th Congress of the Party in November 1981, he was added to the candidate-member list of the Politburo of the Party of Labour of Albania. Between 1982 and 1991, he served again as representative in the National Assembly during the tenth and eleventh legislature.

In July 1985, he was elected as the successor of the First Secretary of the PPSh Ramiz Alia, as Secretary of the Central Committee of the Party. He was succeeded as First Secretary of Tirana by Pirro Kondi, a hardliner and brother-in-law of the late 1979 influential Central Committee Secretary Hysni Kapo, who moreover as Hoxha's confident wrote in the party's newspaper Zëri i Popullit articles about the 1985 deceased former First Secretary Enver Hoxha, in which he attacked factional opponents of Hoxha as Koçi Xoxe, Beqir Balluku, Mehmet Shehu, and others. At the 9th Congress of the PPSh in November 1986, he was elected member of the Politburo. Çami remained within this supreme organ of the Party until his retirement in December 1990.

In 1993 a special court was brought in Tirana against Çami and nine other former high-ranking officials (Muho Asllani, Besnik Bekteshi, Vangjel Çërrava, Hajredin Çeliku, Lenka Çuko, Llambi Gegprifti, Qirjako Mihali, Pali Miska, and Prokop Murra) being charged for "abuse of public funds". The following sentences were given: Mihali and Gegprifti eight years each, Miska and Çuko seven years each, Çami, Çeliku, and Bekteshi six years each, and Çërrava, Murra and Asllani five years each. In June 1996 he was against sentenced. This time he got a life-sentence for "crimes against humanity", considering his position as local First Secretary of the Party. Çami was a member of the Academy of Sciences of Albania during the period 1973–1991, in the philosophy field.
