= Spiro Koleka =

Albanian statesman, politician, and military commander (1908–2001)

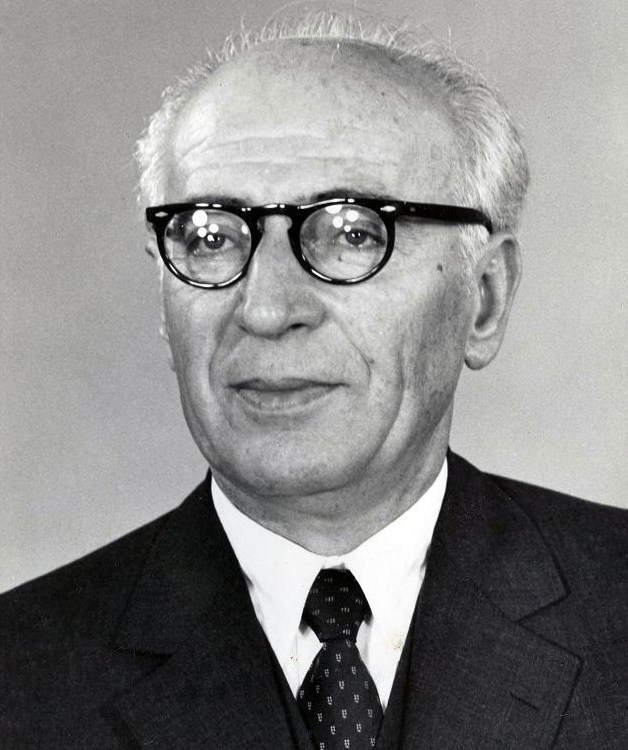

Minister of Industry and Construction
- In office 24 July 1953 – 23 July 1954
- Prime Minister: Enver Hoxha
- Preceded by: Adil Çarçani
- Succeeded by: Xhafer Spahiu

Minister of Communications
- In office October 1948 – ?
- Prime Minister: Enver Hoxha
Other positions
Deputy Prime Minister of Albania
In office 1 November 1968 – 13 November 1976 Serving with Beqir Balluku, Haki Toska, Adil Çarçani, Xhafer Spahiu, Abdyl Këllezi, and Petro Dode
Prime Minister	Mehmet Shehu
In office 4 July 1956 – 18 March 1966 Serving with Beqir Balluku, Manush Myftiu, and Gogo Nushi
Prime Minister	Mehmet Shehu
In office 1 November 1949 – 24 September 1953 Serving with Mehmet Shehu, Tuk Jakova, Hysni Kapo, Spiro Pano, Manush Myftiu, Gogo Nushi, and Bedri Spahiu
Prime Minister	Enver Hoxha
Chairman of the State Planning Commission
In office 18 March 1966 – 1 March 1968
In office 23 July 1954 – 21 June 1958
In office 1 November 1949 – 5 July 1950

Personal details
- Born: 7 July 1908 Vuno, Janina Vilayet, Ottoman Empire (now Albania)
- Died: 22 August 2001 (aged 93) Tirana, Albania
- Party: Party of Labour of Albania
- Spouse: Lica Koleka
- Relatives: Spiro Jorgo Koleka (cousin); Aneta Koleka (grandniece); Edi Rama (great-grandnephew); Olsi Rama (great-grandnephew)
- Education: University of Pisa
- Central institution membership: 1948–1981: Full member, 1st, 2nd, 3rd, 4th, 5th, 6th, 7th Politburo; 1944–1990: Member, People's Assembly of Albania

Spiro Koleka (7 July 1908 – 22 August 2001) was an Albanian statesman, communist politician and a high-ranking military officer during World War II. He was a civil engineer by profession. Spiro Koleka served as a parliament member in all legislatures from 1944 until 1990. Koleka was a member of the Politburo of the Party of Labor of Albania during the years 1948 to 1981. As part of his political career he also served as Chairman of the State Planning Commission, Minister of Industry and Construction of Albania, as well as Vice Prime Minister.

== Ethnicity ==
Spiro Koleka's family was from the village of Vuno, and his clan has had a patriotic Albanian background. In particular, a member of the Koleka clan was Spiro Jorgo Koleka (1879 or 1880–1940), a leader of the Albanian national movement and later interwar government minister.

Edi Rama, a maternal descendant of the Koleka family, has said that the family originates from Mirdita, and that the surname was derived from an ancestor named Kol Leka.

== Life and career ==
Koleka was born in the village of Vuno. After completing his secondary education in the Italo–Albanian college of San Demetrio Corone (Collegio of Sant'Adriano), in the Italian province of Cosenza, Spiro Koleka continued his higher education at the University of Pisa (1930–1934) where he graduated as a civil engineer. After his return to Albania, he was involved in anti-Zogist and anti-Italian activities; in 1935 he participated in the Fier rebellion against King Zog and shortly after found himself arrested by the authorities.

During 1937–39 Spiro Koleka travelled extensively in Italy while taking an active part in the resistance against the Italian occupation of Albania. Upon the Italian occupation (7 April 1939) he fled to Yugoslavia, but returned to Albania in December 1939. During 1940–41 he began cooperating with the communist resistance underground while at the same time co-founding and running the Mani and Koleka Engineering Company. Koleka was elected as a member of the General Council and of the General Staff of the Communist Party of Albania at the Labinot Conference (1943). In May 1944, he was appointed Minister of Public Works at the Pennet Conference, officially in October as part of the first of Hoxha's governments.

In October 1948 he became Minister of Communications, and then also President of the State Planning Commission in November 1948. He was a member of the Politburo. Koleka was part of the Trade Delegation's visit to Moscow in 1949. In November 1949 he became Deputy Prime Minister. In the capacity of Deputy Prime Minister, Koleka presented in 1952 the very first Five-Year Plan for the economy.

Koleka was often accused by various members of the Greek minority for its role in the forced dislocation of their compatriots.

In 1966, he was again appointed chairman of the State Planning Commission.

Koleka's background and experience as a technocrat allowed him to lead numerous economic and political delegations of the time to many East European countries, including the Soviet Union. Moreover, he was reported by the national and international press to be the chief architect of Albanian industrial development which was the backbone of the program of the Albanian Workers' Party after the Second World War.

== Awards ==
- Albanian Medal of Freedom, First Class
- Yugoslav Partisan Star
