= Vangjel Çërrava =

Albanian politician (born 1941)

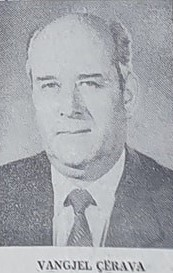

Personal details
- Born: 4 February 1941 (age 85) Korçë, Albania
- Party: Party of Labour

Vangjel Çërrava (born 4 February 1941) is an Albanian politician of the former Albanian Party of Labour (PPSh). He was member of the Albanian Parliament, Deputy Chairman of the Cabinet of Albania, and for a short time member of the Politburo of the Party.

== Biography ==
Çërrava, who initially carried over functions in the economic sector, became in 1978 a representative in the People's Assembly (Alb: Kuvendi Popullor). He remained on this function during the ninth to the eleventh legislative terms which ended in 1991 with the fall of communism in Albania.

In October 1982, he became a member of the Secretariat of the Central Committee of the Party. In this position, he took part in 1985 at the state funeral of Enver Hoxha.

In addition, during the 9th Congress of the Party in November 1986, he was elected candidate-member of the Politburo of the Party of Labour of Albania. Çërrava became member in July 1990. He held this position until the dissolution of the PPSh and the establishment of the Albanian Socialist Party (Alb: Partia Socialiste e Shqipërisë) in June 1991.

Between 20 February 1987 to 2 February 1989, he was also Deputy Chairman of the Council of Ministers in the Government of Adil Çarçani.

In 1993, a special court was established in Tirana against Çërrava and nine other former high-ranking officials (Muho Asllani, Besnik Bekteshi, Foto Çami, Hajredin Çeliku, Lenka Çuko, Llambi Gegprifti, Qirjako Mihali, Pali Miska, and Prokop Murra). They were accused of "abuse of public funds". The following sentences were given: Mihali and Gegprifti eight years each, Miska and Çuko seven years each, Çami, Çeliku and Bekteshi six years each, and Çërrava, Murra and Asllani five years each. All were released shortly-after the turmoils of 1997.
