= Muho Asllani =

Albanian politician (1937–2025)

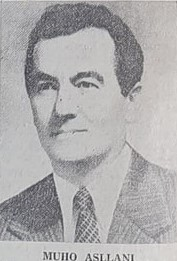
- Asllani in 1986

Personal details
- Born: 17 October 1937 Bërdicë, Shkodër County, Albania
- Died: 4 December 2025 (aged 88)
- Party: Party of Labour of Albania

Muho Asllani (17 October 1937 – 4 December 2025) was an Albanian politician of the Albanian Party of Labour (PPSh). He was a member of the Politburo, a representative in the Albanian Parliament for many years, First Secretary of Party in several districts, and member of the Cabinet of Albania during 1976–1979.

== Early life ==
Asllani was born on 17 October 1937 in Bërdicë near Shkodër, in a poor family. After attending the agricultural technical school in Shkodër, he studied during 1961–1964 at the Agricultural Institute, now the Agricultural University of Tirana (Alb: Universiteti Bujqësor Tiranës).

== Political career ==
The 6th Congress of the PPSh in 1968 found him following the "V.Lenin" Party School in Tirana. In that congress, he became a member of the Central Committee of the Party, although he was not previously a candidate. The next year he served as Secretary of the Party in Shkodër, switching with Prokop Murra.

On 3 January 1974, he was appointed First Secretary of the Party in Mat District, before being sent as First Secretary of the Party in Kukës District. After working as a Deputy Minister of Agriculture from May 1976 to March 1979, Asllani was then First Secretary in Burrel. Shortly thereafter, he was reappointed in Shkodër. Asllani led the front line of the reconstruction work that brought the Shkodër town back to life after the earthquake of 1979, which destroyed and damaged a considerable number of buildings and houses.

At the 8th Congress of the party in November 1981, Asllani became a member of the Politburo of the Party of Labour of Albania. He remained inside the Politburo until December 1990, when he was shifted away by Ramiz Alia, together with Lenka Çuko and Simon Stefani. During the 1980s, Asllani served as First Secretary of the Party in Durrës, the main port city of Albania.

Between 1982 and 1991, respectively during the tenth and eleventh legislature, he was elected representative in the People's Assembly (Alb: Kuvendi Popullor).

There were rumors that Asllani's son was one of many that entered the foreign embassies during summer 1990, thus seeking political-economical refuge in the German embassy. The rumors were never verified.

=== Post-communist era ===
In 1993, a special court rose in Tirana against Asllani and nine other former high-ranking officials (Besnik Bekteshi, Foto Çami, Vangjel Çërrava, Hajredin Çeliku, Lenka Çuko, Llambi Gegprifti, Qirjako Mihali, Pali Miska, and Prokop Murra). They were accused of "abuse of public funds". The following sentences were given: Mihali and Gegprifti eight years each, Miska and Çuko seven years each, Çami, Çeliku and Bekteshi six years each, and Çërrava, Murra and Asllani five years.

Another case against was brought in June 1996, this time for "crimes against humanity". Other co-defendants were the former Politburo members Prokop Murra, Foto Çami, Gaqo Nesho (former First Secretaries of PPSh of Vlora and Tirana), Zef Loka (former director in the Ministry of Internal Affairs), and Dilaver Bengasi, former Deputy Minister of the Interior. The verdict was carried out in August 1996. Murra received 20 year in prison, Asllani and Loka 18, Nesho 16 years and Bengasi 12 years. They were all released shortly after the turmoils of 1997.

Lately, Asllani was member of the Reorganised Party of Labour of Albania, and its Politburo. Nevertheless, he was expelled in May 2013 because his stance against party's decision to stand pro gay rights in Albania.

== Death ==
Asllani died on 4 December 2025, at the age of 88.
