= Politburo of the Party of Labour of Albania =

Politics of Albania

The Politburo (Albanian: Byroja politike) was the leading organ of the Party of Labour of Albania. It comprised key government ministers and Central Committee secretaries and served as the main administrative and policy-making body, convening on a weekly basis.

The following is the composition of the Politburo that would be formed after every Congress of the Party. The politburo for the 1941–48 period is not included.

== Politburo members ==
1st Congress

(8-22.11.1948)
1. Enver Hoxha
2. Mehmet Shehu
3. Hysni Kapo
4. Beqir Balluku
5. Gogo Nushi
6. Spiro Koleka
7. Tuk Jakova (1951)
8. Bedri Spahiu
9. Liri Belishova

2nd Congress

(3-6.4.1952)
1. Enver Hoxha
2. Mehmet Shehu
3. Hysni Kapo
4. Beqir Balluku
5. Gogo Nushi
6. Spiro Koleka
7. Liri Belishova
Candidate members
1. Manush Myftiu
2. Rita Marko
3. Pilo Peristeri

3rd Congress

(3-5.6.1956)
1. Beqir Balluku
2. Enver Hoxha
3. Gogo Nushi
4. Hysni Kapo
5. Liri Belishova (9.9.1960)
6. Manush Myftiu
7. Mehmet Shehu
8. Rita Marko
9. Spiro Koleka
10.Ramiz Alia
Candidate members
1. Koço Theodhosi
2. Pilo Peristeri
3. Adil Çarçani
4. Haki Toska
5. Rrapo Dervishi
6. Ramiz Alia (9.9.1960)

4th Congress

(13-20.2.1961)
1. Enver Hoxha
2. Beqir Balluku
3. Gogo Nushi
4. Hysni Kapo
5. Manush Myftiu
6. Mehmet Shehu
7. Rita Marko
8. Spiro Koleka
9. Ramiz Alia
10.Adil Çarçani
11.Haki Toska
Candidate members
1. Koço Theodhosi
2. Petrit Dume
3. Pilo Peristeri
4. Kadri Hazbiu

5th Congress

(1-8.11.1966)
1. Adil Çarçani
2. Beqir Balluku
3. Enver Hoxha
4. Gogo Nushi
5. Haki Toska
6. Hysni Kapo
7. Manush Myftiu
8. Mehmet Shehu
9. Ramiz Alia
10.Rita Marko
11.Spiro Koleka
Candidate members
1. Kadri Hazbiu (7.11.1971)
2. Koço Theodhosi (7.11.1971)
3. Petrit Dume
4. Abdyl Këllezi (7.11.1971)
5. Pilo Peristeri

Generally, the Central Committee approved Politburo reports and policy decisions. The Secretariat was responsible for guiding the day-to-day affairs of the Party, in particular for organising the execution of Politburo decisions and for selecting Party and government cadres.

6th Congress

(1-7.11.1971)
1. Ramiz Alia
2. Beqir Balluku (10.7.1974)
3. Adil Çarçani
4. Kadri Hazbiu
5. Enver Hoxha
6. Hysni Kapo
7. Abdyl Këllezi (Sep 1975)
8. Spiro Koleka
9. Rita Marko
10.Manush Myftiu
11.Mehmet Shehu
12.Haki Toska
13.Koço Theodhosi (Sep 1975)
Candidate members
1. Pirro Dodbiba (Apr 1976)
2. Petrit Dume (1974)
3. Pilo Peristeri
4. Xhafer Spahiu (7.11.1976)

7th Congress

(1-7.11.1976)
1. Ramiz Alia
2. Adil Çarçani
3. Llambi Gegprifti
4. Kadri Hazbiu
5. Enver Hoxha
6. Hekuran Isai
7. Hysni Kapo (23.9.1979)
8. Spiro Koleka
9. Rita Marko
10.Pali Miska
11.Manush Myftiu
12.Haki Toska
Candidate members
1. Lenka Çuko
2. Qirjako Mihali
3. Pilo Peristeri
4. Simon Stefani

8th Congress

(1.7.11.1981)
1. Enver Hoxha
2. Adil Çarçani
3. Hajredin Çeliku
4. Hekuran Isai
5. Kadri Hazbiu
6. Lenka Çuko
7. Manush Myftiu
8. Mehmet Shehu
9. Muho Asllani
10.Pali Miska
11.Ramiz Alia
12.Rita Marko
13.Simon Stefani
Candidate members
1. Besnik Bekteshi
2. Foto Çami
3. Llambi Gegprifti
4. Prokop Murra
5. Qirjako Mihali

9th Congress

(3-8.11.1986)
1. Adil Çarçani
2. Hajredin Çeliku
3. Hekuran Isai
4. Lenka Çuko
5. Manush Myftiu
6. Muho Asllani
7. Pali Miska
8. Ramiz Alia
9. Rita Marko
10.Simon Stefani
11.Prokop Murra
12.Besnik Bekteshi
13.Foto Çami
Candidate members
1. Kiço Mustaqi
2. Pirro Kondi
3. Llambi Gegprifti
4. Vangjel Çërrava
5. Qirjako Mihali

10th Congress

(11-13.6.1991)
1. Ramiz Alia
2. Muho Asllani
3. Besnik Bekteshi
4. Foto Çami
5. Adil Çarçani
6. Hajredin Çeliku
7. Vangjel Çërrava
8. Lenka Çuko
9. Xhelil Gjoni
10.Hekuran Isai
11.Pali Miska
12.Kiço Mustaqi
13.Simon Stefani
Candidate members
1. Xhemal Dymylja
2. Llambi Gegprifti
3. Niko Gjyzari
4. Pirro Kondi
5. Qirjako Mihali

== See also ==
- Politburo
- Enver Hoxha
- Party of Labour of Albania
- Eastern Bloc politics
