= Movement for Solidarity =

Political party in Albania

Movement for Solidarity is an Albanian political party, the formation of which was announced on September 19, 2007, by former Prime Minister of Albania and former Socialist Party of Albania leader Fatos Nano. He stated he wanted to rebuild and reform the Socialist Party through his new movement.
