= Order and Medal for Distinguished Work in Mining and Geology =

Order and medal of the People's Socialist Republic of Albania

- Native name: Urdhri dhe Medalja "Për punë të shquar në miniera dhe gjeologji"
- Type: State order and medal
- Awarded for: Distinguished achievements in production, geological research, organization and technical-scientific development.
- Country: People's Socialist Republic of Albania
- Presented by: Presidium of the People's Assembly
- Eligibility: Workers in the mining, petroleum, metallurgy and geology sectors
- Status: Discontinued
- Established: 18 January 1965
- Order ribbon

The Order and Medal for Distinguished Work in Mining and Geology (Albanian: Urdhri dhe Medalja "Për punë të shquar në miniera dhe gjeologji") was a state decoration of the People's Socialist Republic of Albania. Awarded for outstanding service and achievements in the fields of mining, petroleum, metallurgy and geology, it comprised three classes along with a separate medal.

== Award criteria ==
The order and medal were awarded to workers in the fields of petroleum, mining, metallurgy and geology, as well as to personnel of the Ministry of Industry and Mines, industrial enterprises, factories and geological research institutions. Collective awards could also be made to expeditions, brigades, work groups and other units.

The decoration recognised exemplary results in production and geological exploration and additional contributions in improving the organization of work, introducing technical and scientific advances, making effective use of machinery and protecting socialist property.

== Insignia ==
=== Order ===
The order had an irregular pentagonal badge measuring approximately 36 mm across. At its center was a circular medallion depicting an industrial landscape with an oil derrick and two crossed hammers.

The First Class badge had a gilt finish, including the central medallion, which was surrounded by a dark border. The reverse was plain and could be either flat or slightly concave. The badge was usually attached directly to clothing with a horizontal pin, although examples with a vertical pin are also known. The insignia was manufactured in Albania.

The Second Class had the same design and dimensions as the First Class but was silver-colored. Its ribbon bar featured two red stripes.

The Third Class followed the same design but was made from a reddish copper-colored metal. Its ribbon bar featured three red stripes. Examples are known with either a flat or concave reverse.

=== Medal ===
The medal was circular and measured approximately 32 mm in diameter. The obverse depicted the profile of a miner wearing a helmet with a headlamp, alongside an oil derrick. The reverse was plain.

The medal was attached to a small pentagonal suspension covered with a yellow silk ribbon featuring five narrow blue stripes. The matching ribbon bar had the same yellow and blue design.

== See also ==
- Orders, decorations, and medals of Albania
