= Prokop Murra =

Albanian politician

Minister of People's Defence
- In office 23 November 1982 – 9 July 1990
- President: Enver Hoxha; Ramiz Alia
- Prime Minister: Adil Çarçani
- Preceded by: Kadri Hazbiu
- Succeeded by: Kiço Mustaqi

Personal details
- Born: 24 November 1921 Tirana, Albania
- Died: 9 September 2005 (aged 83) Tirana, Albania
- Party: Party of Labour of Albania

Prokop Murra (24 November 1921 – 9 September 2005) was an Albanian politician of the Albanian Party of Labour (PPSh).

== Early life ==
Murra was born on 24 November 1921 in Tirana and studied economics. He joined the Albanian Communist Party in 1943 and fought during World War II as a partisan of the National Liberation Movement. He initially worked as a functionary of the party in the economic sector, and petroleum industry. In 1956 he became a member of the Central Committee of the Party.

== Rise in the party ==
In 1962, he was elected for the first time as a representative in the People's Assembly, and remained such until the fifth legislature ending in 1966. In the '70s, he was temporarily First Secretary of PPSh in Shkodra. Furthermore, he was temporarily Deputy Chairman of the State Planning Commission 1980–1981.

At the 7th Congress of the Party which took place in November 1976, Murra was elected a member of the Secretariat of the Central Committee of the Party. He held this position until April 1980.

Between 1978 and 1991, he served again from the ninth to eleventh legislature as representative in the National Assembly.

On April 26, 1980, he was Minister of Industry and Mines in the last government of Prime Minister Mehmet Shehu.

Murra succeeded at the 8th Party Congress in November 1981 to become a candidate member of the Politburo of the Party of Labour of Albania, but was removed from the Secretariat of the Central Committee. In the subsequent government of Adil Çarçani, he served as Minister of Energy (the Ministry of Industry and Mines was split) until 1 July 1982, when he was replaced by Pali Miska.

== Defence Minister (1982–1990) ==
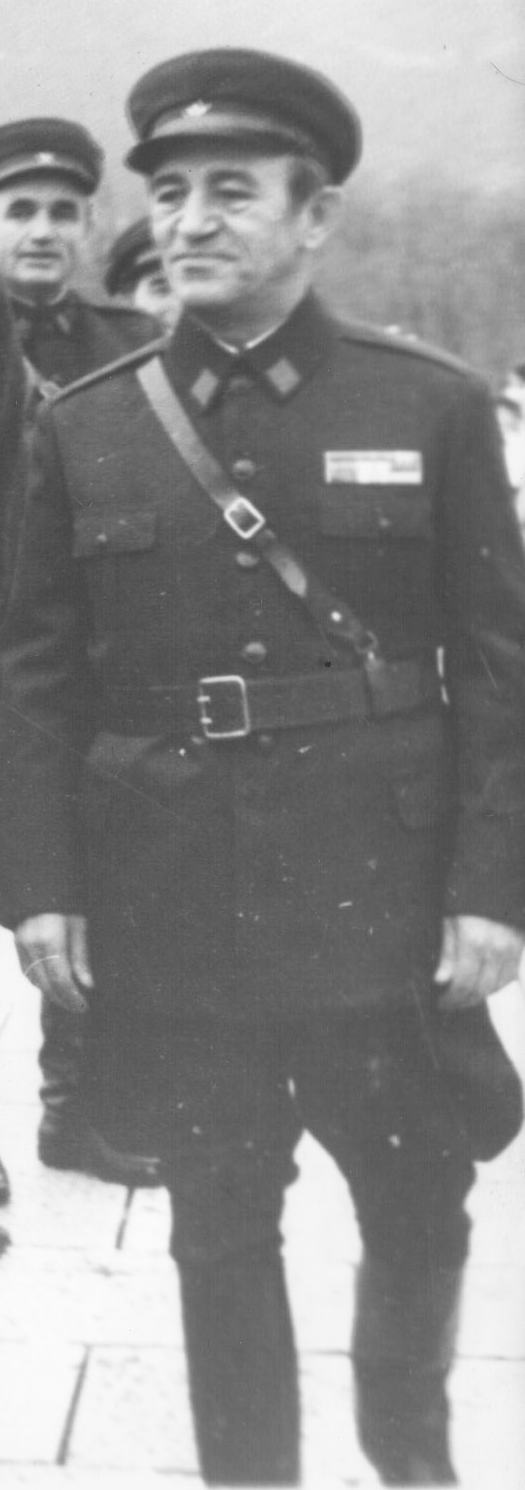
Prokop Murra visiting the National Martyrs' Cemetery of Albania during his tenure as Minister of Defense, dressed in the uniform of the Albanian People's Army.

He served shortly as Party's Secretary in Tirana District, before being replaced by Gaqo "Gogo" Nesho and becoming Minister of People's Defence (Albanian: Minister i Mbrojtjes Popullore) on November 23, 1982. His appointment as Defense Minister was surprising, since he was the first civilian in this position since the founding of the People's Republic of Albania on 11 January 1946. In a speech he gave shortly after the death of Enver Hoxha, he stated that Albania would never establish relations with the superpowers as United States and Soviet Union, and focus on "self-reliance". At the 9th Congress of the Party in 1986, he became member of the Politburo. With Ramiz Alia coming into power after Hoxha's death, he was later removed from the Politburo as a "hard-liner", thus not Alia's favorite. After retiring from the government on July 9, 1990, he was replaced by Kiço Mustaqi as Minister of Defense.

== Post-politics ==
In 1993, a court process came up against Murra and nine other former high-ranking officials (Muho Asllani, Besnik Bekteshi, Foto Çami, Hajredin Çeliku, Lenka Çuko, Llambi Gegprifti, Qirjako Mihali, Pali Miska, and Vangjel Çërrava). They were accused of "abuse of funds". The court in Tirana came up with the following sentences: Mihali and Gegprifti eight years each, Miska and Çuko seven years each, Çami, Çeliku, and Bekteshi six years each, and Çërrava, Murra and Asllani five years each.

Another case rose against him and others in June 1996, this time for "crimes against humanity", according to Art. 74, 67, and 25 of the Albanian Penal Code. Other co-defendants were the former Party local-level politicians as Muho Asllani, Foto Çami, Gaqo Nesho, former 1st secretary of the PPSh in Vlora and Tirana, Zef Loka, former director in the Ministry of Internal Affairs, and Dilaver Benghazi, former Deputy Minister of the Interior. Decision was carried out in August 1996. Murra received a 20-year prison sentence, Asllani and Loka 18, Nesho 16 years, and Benghazi 12 years. They would serve their terms partially. An amnesty came out after the turmoils of 1997.
