= Niko Gjyzari =

Albanian economist and politician

34th Finance Minister of Albania
- In office 16 February 1984 – 19 February 1987
- Prime Minister: Adil Çarçani
- Preceded by: Qirjako Mihali
- Succeeded by: Andrea Nako

Director-General of the Albanian State Bank
- In office 1 January 1991 – 31 August 1991
- Preceded by: Qirjako Mihali
- Succeeded by: Ilir Hoti

Personal details
- Born: 10 November 1934 (age 91) Vlorë, Albanian Kingdom

Niko Gjyzari (born 10 November 1934) is a former Albanian economist and politician who served as Minister of Finances in the Çarçani II Government and later as Director-General of the Albanian State Bank. He was selected as a member candidate of the Politburo of the Labour Party of Albania at the 10th party congress.

== Biography ==
Niko Gjyzari was born on November 10, 1934, in Vlorë, Albanian Kingdom. He finished his primary education in his hometown and later attended the financial technical school "January 11" in Tirana. In 1961, he graduated from the Faculty of Economics at the University of Tirana. From 1956 to 1974, he worked as inspector and chief of finance at the executive committee in Vlorë District. Between 1974 and 1975, he served as budget director inside the Ministry of Finances. From 1975 to 1984 he was Deputy Minister of Finances and from 1984 to 1985 was elevated to the post of Minister of Finances. After his short tenure in charge of the ministry, he was appointed chairman of the State Planning Commission, a post he held until 1990. In that same year, he was named Secretary General of the Council of Ministers. In January 1991, Gjyzari took the important role of Director-General of the Albanian State Bank. In June 1991, he became a candidate member of the Politburo of the Labour Party at the 10th party congress. From August 1991 to May 1992, he served as Deputy Director-General of the State Bank.
