= Mine Guri =

Albanian politician (born 1937)

People's Assembly
- In office 1970–1990

Personal details
- Born: Emine Guri; 15 March 1937 (age 89) Përmet, Albania
- Children: 5
- Occupation: Politician

Emine Guri (born 15 March 1937) is an Albanian politician who served as deputy chair of the Presidium of the People's Assembly.

She was a lathe worker before involving in politics. In 1961 she joined the ruling party of the Communist Albania, Albanian Workers' Party. She became its first secretary in Kuçovë and Berat and a member of People's Assembly in 1970 and served there until 1990. She was made a member of the central committee of the ruling party, Albanian Workers' Party, in November 1976. She was appointed deputy chair of the Presidium of the People's Assembly in November 1982 under the presidency of Ramiz Alia. She also held the post in the last communist government formed in September 1990. The other deputy chair in the same government was Xhafer Spahiu.

Guri married in October 1961 and has five children. As of 2011 Guri was living in Berat.
