= Hekuran Isai =

Albanian politician (1933–2008)

Minister of Interior of the People's Republic of Albania
- In office 15 January 1982 – 1 February 1989
- President: Haxhi Lleshi, Ramiz Alia
- Prime Minister: Adil Çarçani
- Preceded by: Feçor Shehu
- Succeeded by: Simon Stefani
- In office 8 July 1990 – 21 February 1991
- Preceded by: Simon Stefani
- Succeeded by: Gramoz Ruçi

Personal details
- Born: May 7, 1933 Peqin, Albania
- Died: March 26, 2008 (aged 74) Tirana, Albania
- Party: Party of Labour of Albania

Hekuran Isai (7 May 1933 – 26 March 2008) was an Albanian politician of the Albanian Party of Labour (PPSh).

== Life ==
After joining the Albanian Party of Labour (Alb: Partia e Punes së Shqipërisë) in 1957, he studied in the Soviet Union from 1957 to 1960. On his return Isai served as a specialist in a petroleum refinery in Cërrik. In 1962, he was elected first-deputy of the People's Assembly (Alb: Kuvendi Popullor) and was also elected as a member of the parliament from the fifth until the end of the eleventh legislative, ending in 1991. He served initially as member of the Committee on Industry, Mining and Construction.

At the 5th Congress of the Party in November 1966, he was elected first-candidate of the Central Committee (CC) of the Party. In 1967 he started studying at the Party's School "Vladimir Ilyich Lenin" in Tirana, majoring in Political Economy.

Isai worked afterwards as First Secretary of the PPSh in Elbasan District, which at that time included his native town of Peqin, later as First Secretary in Librazhd District from 1970 to 1975, and for a short time First Secretary of the Party in the Dibër District. At the 6th Party Congress in November 1971, he was also elected a member of the Central Committee.

In June 1975 he became a member of the Secretariat of the Central Committee of the PPSh and held this function until November 1986. A few months later, in September 1975, he was elevated as member of the Politburo of the Party, as substitute for the recently purged Deputy Prime Minister and Chairman of the State Planning Commission Abdyl Këllezi. Isai, together with Qirjako Mihali, Pali Miska, and Llambi Gegprifti, represented a new generation of leaders within the Party, which emerged with the termination of relations with the People's Republic of China.

On January 15, 1982 Isai was appointed Minister of the Interior in the government of Prime Minister Adil Çarçani, succeeding another purged figure, Feçor Shehu. As interior minister, he was also head of the secret service Sigurimi and held these two positions until February 2, 1989. Between February 1987 and February 1989 he was also Deputy Chairman of the Council of Ministers.

Between February 1989 and July 1990, he was a member of the Secretariat of the Central Committee. He then took over again on July 9, 1990 until February 22, 1991 as Deputy Prime Minister and Minister of Interior. Most recently, he stated that he opposed the command of the First Secretary of the PPSh (Ramiz Alia) who had ordered shooting at protesters in Tirana during the collapse of communism in February 1991. This claim was however rejected by Alia as untrue.

After the dissolution of the PPSh and the establishment of the Socialist Party of Albania (Alb: Partia Socialiste e Shqipërisë) in June 1991, Isai finally retired from the Politburo.

In 1994, a special court was formed in Tirana against him and former officials Ramiz Alia, Simon Stefani, and Adil Çarçani. They were indicted for "abuse of authority and violation of civil rights". In July 1994 the following sentences were issued: Alia, nine years of imprisonment; Stefani, eight years; Isai, five years; and Çarcani, five years. A similar trial was brought in 1996 for a list of 36 former officials. Isai's name appeared again.

All were released soon after the civil unrest in Albania during 1997.

== See also ==
- Sino-Albanian split
- Sigurimi
- Mehmet Shehu
