= Themie Thomai =

Albanian politician (1945–2020)

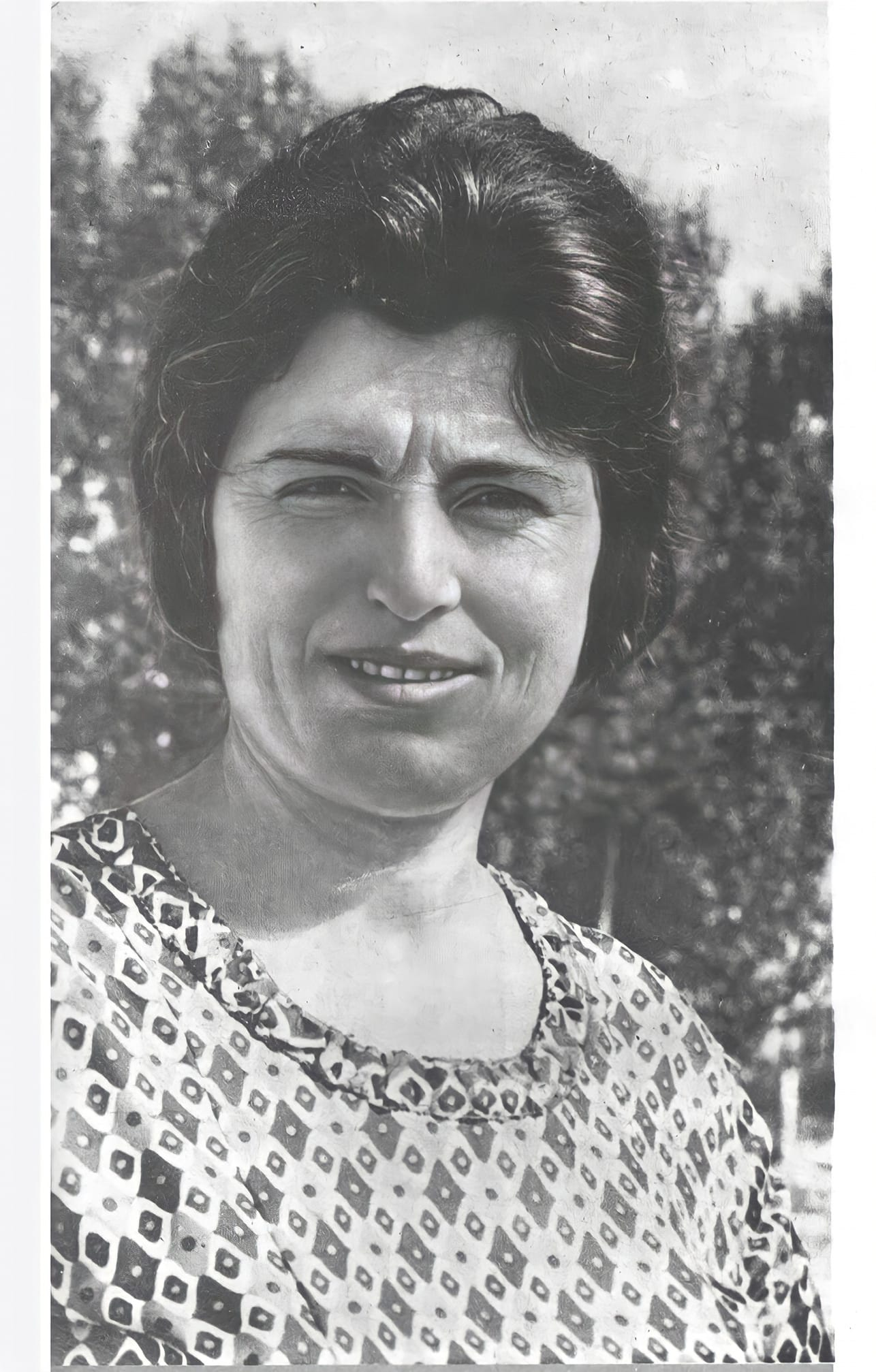
- Themie Thomai in 1975
- Prime Minister: Mehmet Shehu Adil Carcani
- Leader: Enver Hoxha (First Secretary)

Minister of Agriculture
- Preceded by: Pirro Dodbiba
- Succeeded by: Pali Miska

Personal details
- Born: October 31, 1945 Lushnjë, Albania
- Died: December 19, 2020 (aged 75) Tirana, Albania
- Party: Party of Labour
- Children: 2
- Education: Agricultural University of Tirana
- Occupation: Politician

Themie Thomai Prifti (October 31, 1945 – December 19, 2020) was an Albanian politician of the Albanian Party of Labour.

She served as a Minister of Agriculture from 1986 to 1987.

== Career ==
Themie Thomai initially worked as an agricultural worker and then completed a degree in Agricultural Sciences at the Agricultural University of Tirana. After graduating, she worked as an agricultural economist before becoming chairman of an agricultural cooperative with over 4,000 members in 1972. On October 28, 1974, Themie Thomai became for the Party of Labor of Albania PPSh (Partia e Punës e Shqipërisë) for the first time a member of the People's Assembly (Kuvendi Popullor) chosen who she from the eighth to the end of the twelfth Legislative period on February 4, 1992.

As the successor to Pirro Dodbiba she became Minister of Agriculture on (Ministre e Bujqësisë) April 29, 1976 into the sixth government of Prime Minister Mehmet Shehu called. The reason for Dodbiba's dismissal as minister in April 1976 was “professional failure” in the implementation of the party's production goals in agriculture. In 1983 it published a seven-point program for the intensification of agriculture with the subtitle "The constant main path to the development of agricultural production". She held the ministerial office until she was replaced Pali Miska on February 2, 1989. After her dismissal as minister, she became first secretary of the PPSh party committee in February 1989 Lushnja district. At the same time she was vice-chairman of the Democratic Front from 1979 to 1984 (Fronti Democracy), a mass organization to draw up the lists of candidates for the elections to the People's Assembly

== Later life and death ==
Themie Thomai died from COVID-19 in Tirana, Albania, on December 19, 2020, at age 75. She is survived by her daughter, son, and grandchildren.
