= Hajredin Çeliku =

Albanian politician (1927–2005)

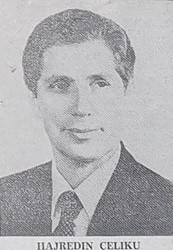

Hajredin Çeliku (May 4, 1927 – June 2005) was a former Albanian politician of the Albanian Party of Labour. He was a member of the Albanian Parliament, Politburo of the Party of Labour of Albania, and served as member of the Cabinet of Albania.

== Life ==
Çeliku was born in Peshkopi, Diber District in the Albanian Republic on 4 May 1927. During World War II he was active in the Young Communist Movement; after the war became member of Albanian Worker Party in 1947. He completed studies in mechanical engineering at University of Tirana.

In 1966, he was Deputy Chairman of the People's Assembly (Alb: Kuvendi Popullor). He served as representative in the sixth parliamentary term until 1970. In the following years he worked as a functionary of the Party in the economic sector, and Secretary of the Party for Tirana.

At the 8th Congress of the Party in November 1981, he was elected member of the Politburo of the party without being a candidate-member first. Çeliku remained member of this supreme governing body until December 1990.

Between 1982 and 1991, he served again as representative during the tenth and eleventh legislature of the People's Assembly.

On November 23, 1982, Prime Minister Adil Çarçani appointed him the Minister of Mines and Energy in his government. After that, he was in 1989 a member of the Secretariat of the Central Committee of the Party. He was Minister of Transports again 1987-1989, and the next Çarçani government until 23 December 1990.

In 1993, a special court rose in Tirana against Çeliku and nine other former high-ranking officials (Besnik Bekteshi, Foto Çami, Vangjel Çërrava, Muho Asllani, Lenka Çuko, Llambi Gegprifti, Qirjako Mihali, Pali Miska, and Prokop Murra). They were accused of "abuse of public funds". The following sentences were given: Mihali and Gegprifti eight years each, Miska and Çuko seven years each, Çami, Çeliku and Bekteshi six years each, and Çërrava, Murra and Asllani five years each.
