= Shkelqim Meta =

Albanian politician

Shkelqim Meta is an Albanian politician.

He was President of the Socialist Party of Skrapar, (1992–1996) and candidate for President of the Albanian Socialist Party. He ran for the presidency of the Albanian Socialist Party against Fatos Nano in 1999 and Edi Rama in 2007. He is also a former General Directorate of Prisons in Albania.
