= Qirjako Mihali =

Albanian politician (1929–2009)

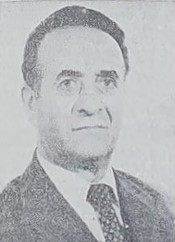

Minister of Finance
- In office 1982–1984

Personal details
- Born: 13 May 1929 Korçë, Albania
- Died: 7 April 2009 (aged 79) Milan, Italy
- Party: Party of Labour

Qirjako Mihali (13 May 1929 – 7 April 2009) was an Albanian politician of the Albanian Party of Labour. He was a candidate-member of the Politburo of the Party of Labour of Albania, Minister of Finance, and member of the Albanian Parliament.

== Biography ==
Mihali began his career as a functionary of the Party of Labour in the business sector, most recently from 1967 to 1975 he was Director of Nitrogen Producing Plant ("Azotik") in Fier.

In January 1975, he became for candidate-member of the Politburo of the Party. He held this position until his retirement in December 1990. Together with Hekuran Isai, Pali Miska, and Llambi Gegprifti, Mihali represented a new generation of leaders within the Party, which gain power with the termination of relations with the People's Republic of China.

On 26 November 1977 he was appointed Deputy Chairman of the Council of Ministers in the government of Prime Minister Mehmet Shehu.
In 1978, he was elected for the first time as representative in the People's Assembly (Alb: Kuvendi Popullor). Mihali was member of the parliament during the ninth to eleventh legislative term.

After the death of Mehmet Shehu, he was also considered as a possible successor as Chairman of the Council of Ministers. However, on 15 January 1982, he was chosen to succeed Haki Toska as Minister of Finance. He held this office until his replacement by Niko Gjyzari on 17 February 1984.

Mihali regained his position as Deputy Prime Minister in the following cabinet of Prime Minister Adil Çarçani starting on 20 February 1987. In 1986, he took over also as Chairman of the State Planning Commission.

Later he served from March 1989 to December 1990 as Director-General of the Albanian State Bank.

A special court was established in Tirana in 1993 against Mihali and nine other former high-ranking officials (Muho Asllani, Besnik Bekteshi, Foto Çami, Hajredin Çeliku, Vangjel Çërrava, Lenka Çuko, Pali Miska and Prokop Murra), accused of "abuse of public funds". The following sentences were given: Mihali and Gegprifti eight years each, Miska and Çuko seven years each, Çami, Çeliku and Bekteshi six years each, and Çërrava, Murra and Asllani five years each.

Together with Pirro Kondi and Sulejman Bushati, Mihali was brought in front of another court session in August 1996, this time for "crimes against humanity". The sentence this time was 17 years. The court verdict remained below the request of the prosecutor, who had requested 20 years in prison for him. All were released short-after the turmoils of 1997.
