= Trade Unions of Albania =

Trade unions in Albania

The Trade Unions of Albania (Albanian: Bashkimet Profesionale të Shqipërisë, BPSh) was a mass organization of the Party of Labour of Albania during the socialist period which represented the interests of the working class in industry. Like other mass organizations it was a member of the Democratic Front.

== History ==
Shortly after the liberation of Albania from Nazi German occupation on November 29, 1944, prewar labor leaders began campaigning for the establishment of a postwar trade union organization. On February 11, 1945, a national conference bringing together representatives of various labor groups formed the Provisional General Council of Workers' Syndicates of Albania. It was tasked with becoming "the pillar of the Democratic Front and the people's power." (Note: Quoted by the Institute of Marxist-Leninist Studies at the Central Committee of the Party of Labor of Albania.) In October that same year it held its First National Congress in which it adopted the name Syndicate Union of Albania, and at its Second National Congress in October 1949 changed its name to the Trade Unions of Albania. At the time of its Third National Congress in August 1952 it was noted that it was composed of unions in industry, mining, state farm agriculture, forestry, transport, administration, trade, health, education and culture. Its newspaper was known as Puna which carried "articles on various aspects from the life of the Albanian working class, as well as materials expressing the attitude of the Trade Unions of Albania towards problems of the international worker['s] movement." In 1945 it joined the World Federation of Trade Unions, although after 1965 it de facto ceased to participate (despite not formally withdrawing from the organization) owing to worsening relations with the Soviet Union and the Sino-Soviet split, though it did mend relations as a result of the restoration of Albania's diplomatic relations with the Soviet Government in 1990.

National Congresses were held every five years in which a General Council was elected which in turn elected a Presidium; the Presidents of the General Council were:

Term	Name
1945–1947	Tuk Jakova
1949–1951	Gogo Nushi
1951–1958	Pilo Peristeri
1958–1970	Gogo Nushi
1970–1982	Rita Marko
1982–1991	Sotir Koçollari

Some membership dates of the BPSh are as follows: (Note: For the 1965 membership claim see U.S. Department of Labor. Directory of Labor Organizations: Europe Vol. 1. Washington, DC: Government Printing Office. 1965. p. xxviii.)

Year	Membership
1945	23,000
1952	88,105
1965	153,000
1970	400,000
1982	610,000
1990	840,000

In April 1991 Koçollari resigned as leader of the BPSh and an interim executive committee headed by Kastriot Muço was formed, which at the 11th National Congress established the Confederation of Trade Unions as the non-communist successor organization of the BPSh.

== Functions ==
The role of the trade unions was defined in Article 6 of the 1966 Labor Code as follows: "The workers and employees have the right to organize in trade unions. The trade unions of Albania are social organizations of the masses. They unite the workers and employees on a voluntary basis, and operate as a school of communist education under the leadership of the Party of Labor of Albania in accordance with its statutes." Article 7 further states that, "Organized into trade unions and conscious of the working-class mission to build socialism, the workers and employees participate in directing the economy, in drafting and realizing the state plans for economic development, in solving the problems of work and production, and in cultural activities and the increased well-being of the people. The workers, employees, and their trade union organizations fight to strengthen discipline in the state and at work to continuously increase production, and to preserve and maintain state property. They control the administrative activity of enterprises, institutions, and organizations with the result that these groups function better, the people's government becomes stronger, and bureaucratic excesses may be avoided."

The July 1945 Law for the Protection of Workers and Regulations of Work gave the trade unions "sweeping powers to regulate hours, wages, working conditions, and the hiring and dismissal of manual and professional workers." Among the tasks of the unions was "to make and approve collective contracts and to control their execution" and to promote socialist emulation in enterprises. One sympathetic author noted that, "Manager, Party and trade union run the enterprise in compliance with the directives of the current plan on the basis of democratic centralism combining centralised leadership with the maximum creative participation of workers engaged directly in production." A critical work, meanwhile, describes their functions as follows: "Throughout their existence the unions have been, for all practical purposes, an appendage of the party machine, performing such set tasks as fulfilling the government's economic plans, maintaining labour discipline, spreading the official gospel among their members."

A 1982 Government work noted that the trade unions participated in the "drafting and editing of laws on labour and wages; supervise the application of rules on safety at work and technical security; exercise social control on behalf of the masses over the execution of housing construction plans and participate in the allocation of houses; control the activity of commercial enterprises and public catering," and that, "Through the trade-unions the workers exercise their control over the rates of utilization of state social insurance funds, the accommodation of the workers and their children in rest-homes, check the execution of plans for the construction of health and prophylactic institutions, the work of health services, etc."

The trade unions also managed holiday houses and other vacation and recreational areas for workers.
