= Lenka Çuko =

Albanian former politician

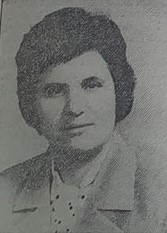

Personal details
- Born: 8 July 1938 (age 87); Lushnje, Albanian Kingdom
- Political party: Party of Labour
- Occupation: Politician

Lenka Çuko (born 8 July 1938) is an Albanian former politician of the Albanian Party of Labour (PPSh).

== Biography ==
Çuko was born in Lushnjë to a family of partial Aromanian origins.

In 1970, she was elected first-deputy of the People's Assembly (Albanian: Kuvendi Popullor). She was in member of the parliament from the seventh to the eleventh legislative term which ended in 1991. Moreover, at the 6th Party Congress in November 1971, she was elected member of the Central Committee (CC) of the PPSh, making it one of the few female members of this body. In addition, she worked for several years in the 1st Secretary of the PPSh in Lushnjë District.

At the 7th Congress of the Labour Party in November 1976, she was elected candidate-member to the Politburo of the Party. She was the first woman on the politburo since the dismissal of Liri Belishova in September 1960. Women comprised about 20% of the Central Committee of the Party in 1981.

At the 8th Congress of the Labour Party in November 1981, she succeeded as member of the Politburo of the Labour Party and remained within this supreme governing body of the party until December 1990. On 25 January 1983, she was also secretary of the Central Committee of the Party and also exercised this function until December 1990. As a Central Committee secretary, she was responsible for the party organization.

In 1993, a special court was brought against Çuko, and nine other former senior officials of the Party: Muho Asllani, Besnik Bekteshi, Foto Çami, Hajredin Çeliku, Vangjel Çërrava, Llambi Gegprifti, Qirjako Mihali, Pali Miska, and Prokop Murra. They were accused of "abuse of funds". The court (in Tirana) gave the following sentences: Mihali and Gegprifti eight years, Miska and Çuko each seven years, Çami, Çeliku and Bekteshi of six years, and Çërrava, Murra and Asllani five years.

In July 1996, another charge for "crimes against humanity" was brought against Çuko, Llambi Gegprifti, and Irakli Vero and others, all high rank officials who had served as first secretary in local government bodies. In September 1996, the court sentenced to 20 years Gegprifti, Vero to 16 years, and Çuko to 15 years' imprisonment. The six other defendants also received prison sentences of between 15 and 20 years. The Supreme Court of Albania confirmed these convictions in November 1996. All were briefly released after the turmoils of 1997.
