= Pali Miska =

Albanian politician (1931–2009)

28th Speaker of the Parliament of Albania
- In office 22 November 1982 – 19 February 1987
- Preceded by: Simon Stefani
- Succeeded by: Petro Dode

Personal details
- Born: 19 May 1931; Bradvicë, Albania
- Died: September 2009 (aged 78)
- Political party: Party of Labour of Albania

Pali Miska (19 May 1931 – September 2009) was an Albanian politician of the Communist Era. He served as Chairman of the Assembly of the Republic of Albania from 22 November 1982 to 19 February 1987.

Miska was first as a party functionary in Fushë Arrëz, the largest Albanian state enterprise for timber production.

In 1970, he was elected first-deputy of the People's Assembly (Alb: Kuvendi Popullor), and served as member from the seventh to the end of the eleventh legislative term until 1991. In 1971, he became candidate of the Central Committee (CC) of the selected PPSh, and simultaneously the First Party Secretary in Pukë District in northern Albania.

In September 1975, Miska succeeded the demised Koço Theodhosi as member of the Politburo of the Party of Labour of Albania without previous candidate status. He became also member of the Central Committee of the Party. He had these positions until the metamorphosis of the Labour Party to Socialist Party (Alb: Partia Socialiste e Shqipërisë) in June 1991. Together with Hekuran Isai, Qirjako Mihali, and Llambi Gegprifti, Miska was part of a new generation of leaders within the party, which emerged and gained influence with the termination of relations with the People's Republic of China. (see Sino-Albanian split)

Miska held also government positions. On 1 September 1975, he succeeded Theodhosi as well as Minister of Industry and Mines in the Government of Prime Minister Mehmet Shehu. As part of a government reshuffle which took place on 13 November 1976, Miska was appointment Deputy Chairman of the Council of Ministers, succeeding Spiro Koleka. He held his function until 23 November 1982.

On 1 July 1982, the newly elected prime minister Adil Çarçani, appointed him Minister of Energy, thus succeeding Prokop Murra. He held the position until 23 November 1982. He was subsequently appointed as successor to Simon Stefani as Chairman of the National Assembly, and therefore Parliament Speaker, from 22 November 1982 to 19 February 1987 before being succeeded by Petro Dode. In this capacity, he also participated in the state funeral for the late First Secretary of the PPSh Enver Hoxha in April 1985.

On 2 February 1989, Albanian prime minister Çarçani chose him to replace Besnik Bekteshi and Themie Thomai as deputy prime minister and Minister of Agriculture, positions he held until 21 February 1991.

In 1993, Miska would be sentenced together with other nine former high-ranking officials (Muho Asllani, Besnik Bekteshi, Foto Çami, Hajredin Çeliku, Vangjel Çërrava, Lenka Çuko, Qirjako Mihali, and Prokop Murra), being accused of "funds abuse". He got sentenced to eight years in prison by a court in Tirana. Miska would serve only part of the sentence.
