= Pecë =

Pecë Πετσά
- Village
- Location within Albania
- Coordinates: 39°56′N 20°10′E
- Country: Albania
- County: Vlorë
- Municipality: Finiq
- Administrative unit: Mesopotam
- Time zone: UTC+1 (CET)
  - Summer (DST): UTC+2 (CEST)
- Postal Code: 9717

Pecë (Albanian definite form: Peca; Greek: Πετσά), is a village of the administrative unit of Mesopotam, Finiq, southern Albania.

Pecë is among the villages in which members of the ethnic Greek minority reside. A fieldwork of 1995 showed that it is one of the two villages, together with Muzinë, of the former Mesopotam commune that is inhabited solely by the Albanian Orthodox population, while the other villages of the commune are inhabited by the Greek community in Albania.

At 1873-1874 a Greek school was operating in the village.

== Notable people ==
- Kiço Mustaqi, Albanian general; served as Chief of the General Staff and as Minister of Defence
