= Sudanese Communist Party – Revolutionary Leadership =

Sudanese Communist Party – Revolutionary Leadership الحزب الشيوعي السوداني – القيادة الثورية
- Founded: 1965
- Split from: SCP
- Ideology: Communism; Marxism–Leninism; Mao Zedong Thought; Anti-revisionism
- Political position: Far-left

The Sudanese Communist Party – Revolutionary Leadership (Arabic: الحزب الشيوعي السوداني – القيادة الثورية) was a communist party in Sudan. It emerged as a pro-Chinese split, after internal division inside the Sudanese Communist Party in August 1964.

The split in the Sudanese Communist Party was provoked by the Sino-Soviet split. Whilst the Sudanese Communist Party leadership supported participating in Central Council election under the regime of Ibrahim Abboud in 1963, the faction that created the Revolutionary Leadership rejected electoral politics and called for armed struggle. Some of the founders of the new party had been expelled from the Sudanese Communist Party after accusing the party general secretary for misappropriation of funds provided by the Soviet embassy. Others had left voluntarily. The Revolutionary Leadership was led by Yusuf Abd' al-Majid. On 12 November 1965 the Sudanese Communist Party denounced the Revolutionary Leadership as an "agent organization", citing Chinese interference.

The Revolutionary Leadership sent a delegation to the 1966 5th Party Congress of the Party of Labour of Albania.

The party failed to gain a mass following. By 1966 it had split into three factions, "A", "B" and "C". The party called for boycott of the 1968 elections. After the 25 May 1969 coup, state repression virtually paralysed the workings of all the remnants of the party. Commenting on the post-coup repression the Chinese news agency Hsinhua stated that "[j]ust as the Soviet Social-Imperialists abandoned the heroic Greek freedom fighters to the Hitlerite dictatorial rule of the royalist-fascist runnings dogs of U.S. imperialism, so they have now delivered the militant elements of the Revolutionary Leaders factions of the Sudan Communist Party into the hands of the depraved Nimeiry".

The Revolutionary Leadership sent a delegation to the 1971 6th Congress of the Party of Labour of Albania.

In the mid-1980s, the party joined the Progressive Democratic Front. As of 1999 Ahmed Mohamed Shamy was a leader of the party.

== See also ==
- List of anti-revisionist groups
