= Besnik Bekteshi =

Albanian politician (born 1941)

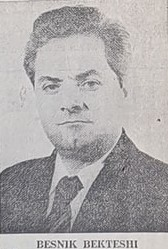

Personal details
- Born: 11 August 1941 (age 84) Shkodër, Albania
- Party: Party of Labour of Albania

Besnik Bekteshi (born 11 August 1941) is an Albanian politician of the former Albanian Party of Labour (PPSh). He has served as Deputy Prime Minister and Minister of Industry of Communist Albania.

== Biography ==
Bekteshi was born on 11 August 1941 in Shkodër. He studied construction engineering in the University of Tirana. He actively participated in the construction of "Light of the Party" (Alb: Drita e Partisë) Fierza Hydroelectric Power Station, one of the largest built on the Drin river, and one of the major works of the Communist Albania.

Bekteshi became member of the Party of Labour in 1973. He worked within the PPSh as a functionary in the economic sector. At the 8th Congress of the PPSh in November 1981, he was chosen as a candidate-member of the Politburo of PPSh.

On 23 November 1982, he became Deputy Chairman of the Council of Ministers in the government of Prime Minister Adil Çarçani. He held this position until February 2, 1989. Between 1982 and 1991, he served as representative the People's Assembly (Alb: Kuvendi Popullor), respectively in the tenth and eleventh legislature as representative of Shkodër District.

Finally, on the 9th Congress of the Party in November 1986, he was elected member of the Politburo. Bekteshi remained such until the dissolution of the party and the establishment of the Socialist Party of Albania (Alb: Partia Socialiste e Shqipërisë) on in June 1991. Moreover, Bekteshi was involved a government reshuffle between 2 February 1989 and 22 February 1991 as Minister of Industries and Mines and Minister of Energy in the 3rd Çarçani Government, succeeding the previously incumbents Llambi Gegprifti and Lavdosh Hametaj.

In 1993, a special court was staged in Tirana against Bekteshi and nine other former high-ranking officials (Muho Asllani, Foto Çami, Vangjel Çërrava, Hajredin Çeliku, Lenka Çuko, Llambi Gegprifti, Qirjako Mihali, Pali Miska, and Prokop Murra). They were accused of "abuse of public funds". The following sentences were given: Mihali and Gegprifti eight years each, Miska and Çuko seven years each, Çami, Çeliku and Bekteshi six years each, and Çërrava, Murra, and Asllani five years.

Bekteshi is the father-in-law of the Albanian singer and producer Ardit Gjebrea.
