= Manush Myftiu =

Albanian politician

Deputy Prime Minister of Albania
- In office 12 November 1976 – 7 July 1990
- Prime Minister: Mehmet Shehu; Adil Çarçani
- In office 5 March 1951 – 11 April 1952
- Prime Minister: Enver Hoxha

Member of the Politboro
- In office 1956–1990
- Chair of the Presidium: Haxhi Lleshi (1956-1982); Ramiz Alia (1982-1990)

Minister of Education of Albania
- In office 22 June 1958 – 22 June 1965
- Prime Minister: Mehmet Shehu
- Preceded by: Ramiz Alia
- Succeeded by: Thoma Deliana

Minister of Health of Albania
- In office 4 June 1956 – 4 February 1958
- Prime Minister: Mehmet Shehu
- Preceded by: Ibrahim Dervishi
- Succeeded by: Taqi Skëndi

Deputy Minister of Foreign Affairs
- In office May 1950 – April 1951
- Prime Minister: Enver Hoxha
- Foreign Minister: Enver Hoxha

15th Speaker of the Parliament of Albania
- In office 1947–1949
- Preceded by: Ymer Dishnica
- Succeeded by: Gogo Nushi

Personal details
- Born: 16 January 1919 Vlora, Principality of Albania
- Died: 20 October 1997 (aged 78)
- Party: Party of Labour of Albania

Manush Myftiu (16 January 1919 – 20 October 1997) was an Albanian politician during the country's socialist period. He served in a number of positions, most recently as the deputy prime minister.

== Early life ==
Myftiu was born in Vlora to a family of Albanian Muslim landowners. In 1939, he graduated from a Classical Lycée in Rome, Italy and while in his hometown, joined a communist cell. From 1940 to 1941 he studied at the Medical Faculty of the University of Turin but did not complete his studies, returning to Vlora where he was obliged to join the Albanian Fascist Youth. While a member of it, he simultaneously remained a member of a communist cell, carrying out clandestine activities against fascism and becoming a member of the Communist Party of Albania (from 1948, the Party of Labour of Albania) after it was founded. During the war he became Commissar of the Fifth Partisan Brigade, commissar of the First Combat Division, and was attached to the Fifth and Eighth Brigades of the First Army Corps.

During the war, he served as a member of the Vlora District Party Committee.

== Political career ==
After the war, Myftiu was active in the Communist political structure and became a protégé of Mehmet Shehu. From 1947 to 1949, he served as Chair of the People's Assembly of Albania. He then served as Minister without portfolio from 1949 to 1950.

In November 1948, he became a member of the central committee of the Party of Labour of Albania. He remained a member of the central committee until it was disbanded when the party transitioned into the Socialist Party of Albania.

From May 1950 to April 1951, he served as Deputy Minister of Foreign Affairs.

On 4 July 1950, Myftiu was appointed President of the Control Commission. He served in this position until 5 March 1951, replaced by Mehmet Shehu.

On 5 March 1951, Myftiu was made a vice-premier and replaced Manol Konomi as the Minister of Justice as part of a series of changes to the cabinet. He held this post until 6 September 1951, when he was dismissed and replaced by Bilbil Klosi as part of a cabinet reshuffle.

On 11 April 1952, it was announced that Myftiu was dismissed as vice-premier. On 12 July 1954, following a reorganization of the Party of Labour of Albania, Myftiu and Josif Pashko were replaced in their party posts by Gogo Nushi and Liri Belishova. On 20 July 1954, Myftiu became vice-premier once again.

He became a candidate member of the Politburo in 1952 and a full member of the Politburo from 1956 to 1990.

From 1956 to 1958, Myftiu served as Minister of Health. From 1958 to 1965, he served as Minister of Education.

From 1966 to 1976, he was First Secretary of the Tirana District Party Committee. From 1976 to 1990, he served as deputy prime minister.

== Later life ==
On 2 July 1994, Myftiu was sentenced to five years in prison on the charge of abusing his powers during his time in office, but was released on account of his advanced age.

== Additional References ==
- Elsie, Robert. A Biographical Dictionary of Albanian History. London: I.B. Tauris. 2012. p. 324.
- Skendi, Stavro (ed). Albania. New York: Frederick A. Praeger. 1956. pp. 334–335.
