= Petro Dode =

Albanian politician

29th Speaker of the Parliament of Albania
- In office 19 February 1987 – 17 April 1990
- Preceded by: Pali Miska
- Succeeded by: Kastriot Islami

Personal details
- Born: 17 April 1924; Pobicjë, Kolonjë, Principality of Albania
- Died: Tirana, Albania
- Political party: Party of Labour of Albania

Petro Dode (born 17 April 1924, date of death unknown) was an Albanian politician. He served as Chairman of the Assembly of the Republic of Albania from 19 February 1987 to 17 April 1990.

Dode was a party functionary. He authored technical and political books, such as: 20 Vjet Shqipëri socialiste (20 years of Socialist Albania) in 1964, Revizionizmi jugosllav dhe pasojat e tij në ekonominë bujqësore të Jugosllavisë (Yugoslav revisionism and its effects on the Yugoslav agricultural economy) of 1962, and Probleme të planifikimit dhe të zhvillimit ekonomisë bujqësore në RPSH (Topics on planning and agricultural economy development in the PSR of Albania) of 1965.

In addition, he was also first candidate of the Central Committee (CC) of the Party of Labour of Albania (PPSh).

In 1966, he was first-deputy of the People's Assembly (Alb: Kuvendi Popullor). Dode was member of the parliament from the sixth to the end of the eleventh legislative term ending in 1991.

After the demise of Abdyl Këllezi, he succeeded on 1 September 1975 as Deputy Chairman of the Council of Ministers led by Prime Minister Mehmet Shehu, position he held until January 14, 1982. At the same time, on 1 September 1975, Dode also succeeded Këllezi as Chairman of the State Planning Commission until 23 November 1982. He was succeeded by Harilla Papajorgji as Chairman of the State Planning Commission in the Çarçani II Government.

On February 19, 1987, he was elected President of the People's Assembly of the People's Socialist Republic of Albania, position previously held by Pali Miska. He held this position until 17 April 1990 and was therefore the last officeholder of the position of President of the People's Assembly of the People's Republic of Albania.

Throughout his life, Petro Dode was known to be a smart man with an affinity for gardening. His house was located on the infamous Block reserved only for Albania’s elite government officials.
