= Haki Toska =

Albanian politician (1920–1994)

- Born: May 8, 1920; Gjirokastër, Albania
- Died: December 27, 1994 (aged 74); Tirana, Albania
- Occupation: Politician
- Known for: Senior official in the Albanian communist regime
- Political party: Albanian Party of Labour

Haki Toska (May 8, 1920 – December 27, 1994) was an Albanian politician of the Albanian Party of Labour.

== Biography ==
Toska was born on 8 May 1920 in Gjirokastër to Albanian parents who spoke with the Tosk dialect of Albanian hence the surname Toska. He participated during the Second World War from 1942 to 1944 as member of the National Liberation Movement (LANC). By the end of the war he was the political commissar of the 6th Brigade of LANC.

In 1954, he was elected first-deputy of the People's Assembly (Alb: Kuvendi Popullor), while being a representative of Gjirokastër District for a long time; from the third until the end of the eleventh legislative period ending in 1991. In addition, he was a member of the Central Committee (CC) of the Party.

At the 3rd Congress of the Party in June 1956, he was a candidate-member of the Politburo of the Party of Labour of Albania. He was also elected Secretary of the Central Committee of the Party, a very high rank. At the 4th Congress in February 1961, he was elected member of the Politburo, position he held until 1981.

In November 1966, he resigned from his position as Central Committee Secretary. Toska had already become Deputy Prime Minister in the government of Mehmet Shehu on 18 March 1966. As such, he was head of the Albanian government delegation at the ceremony the 20th anniversary of establishment the People's Republic of China. He held the deputy position until November 23, 1970. He dealt mainly agricultural part of the economy. Toska was elected again, from November 1970 to November 1976, Secretary of the Central Committee of the Party. He exchanged his former office (as Deputy PM) with Xhafer Spahiu, which would focus more on the industrial issues.

Subsequently, Toska was elected on 13 November 1976 as a successor to Lefter Goga as Minister of Finance of the cabinet of Mehmet Shehu, position he held until 14 January 1982. He was succeeded by Qirjako Mihali. He died on 27 December 1994 in Tirana.
