= Fatos Nano =

Albanian politician (1952–2025)

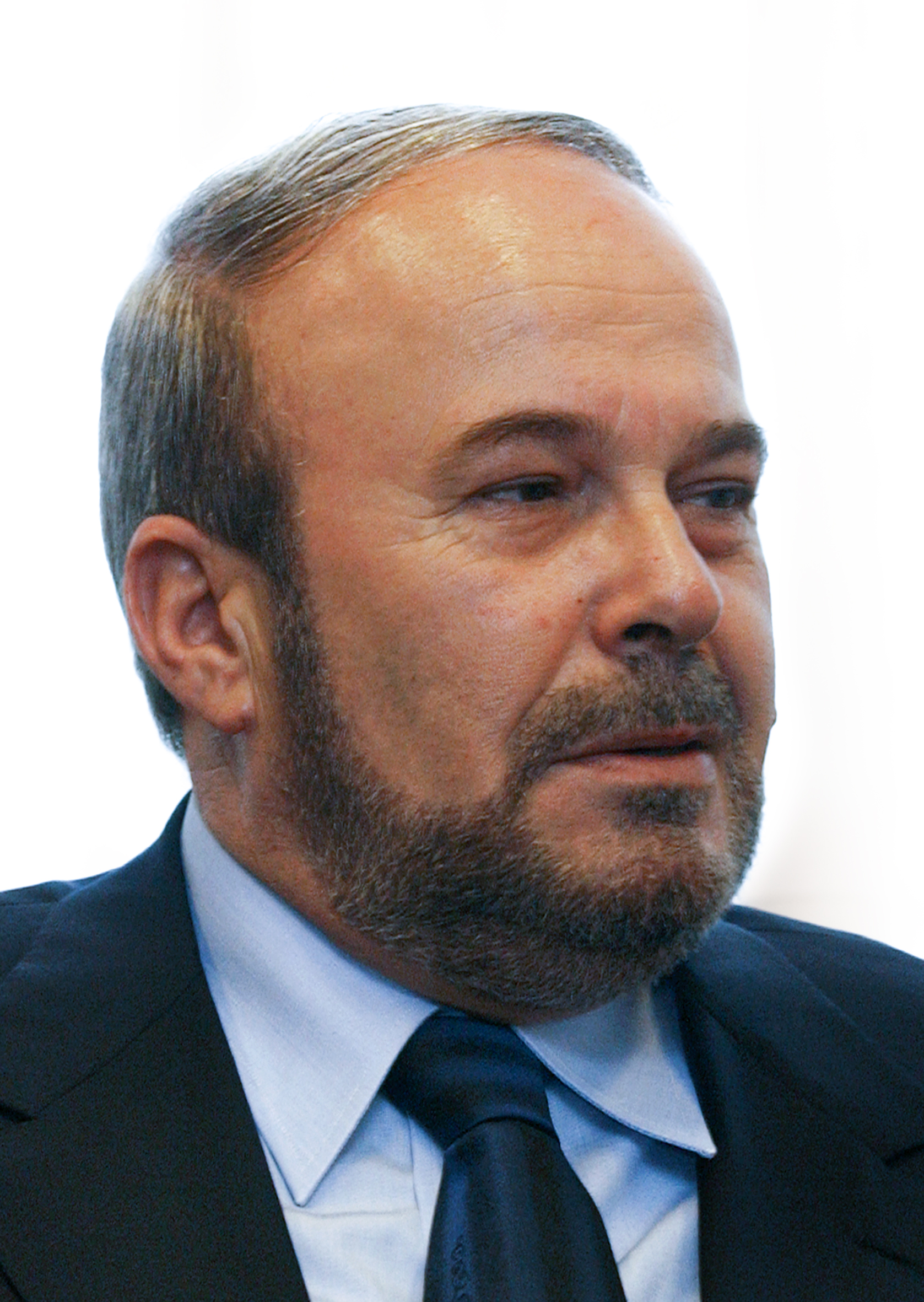
- Nano in 2004

25th Prime Minister of Albania
- In office 31 July 2002 – 10 September 2005
- President: Alfred Moisiu
- Preceded by: Pandeli Majko
- Succeeded by: Sali Berisha
- In office 25 July 1997 – 28 September 1998
- President: Rexhep Meidani
- Preceded by: Bashkim Fino
- Succeeded by: Pandeli Majko
- In office 22 February 1991 – 5 June 1991
- President: Ramiz Alia
- Preceded by: Adil Çarçani
- Succeeded by: Ylli Bufi

Leader of the Opposition
- In office 9 April 1992 – 25 July 1997
- Preceded by: Sali Berisha
- Succeeded by: Sali Berisha

Chairman of the Socialist Party of Albania
- In office 13 June 1991 – 10 October 2005
- Preceded by: Office established
- Succeeded by: Edi Rama

Personal details
- Born: Fatos Thanas Nano; 16 September 1952 Tirana, Albania
- Died: 31 October 2025 (aged 73) Tirana, Albania
- Party: Socialist Party
- Spouse(s): Rexhina Nano (m. 1976; div. 2001) Xhoana Nano (m. 2002)
- Children: Sokol Nano; Klajdi Nano (stepson)
- Education: University of Tirana

Fatos Thanas Nano (16 September 1952 – 31 October 2025) was an Albanian socialist politician who served as Prime Minister of Albania in 1991, from 1997 to 1998 and from 2002 to 2005. Nano was the first leader and founder of the Socialist Party of Albania and a member of the Albanian Parliament from 1991 to 1993 and 1997 to 2009. He reformed the anti-revisionist Marxist-Leninist ideology of the Labour Party of Albania into social democracy for its successor, the Socialist Party.

During his leadership, the Socialist Party, as a result of reforms, joined the Socialist International and Party of European Socialists. Nano was a candidate in the 2007 presidential election but did not win. He again tried in the 2012 presidential election, but he did not even qualify as a candidate, because the leaders of parties in Parliament obstructed their respective MPs to elect him as candidate in the elections.

== Early life ==
Fatos Nano was born in Tirana on 16 September 1952. His parents were Thanas Nano, a former director of Albanian Radio Television, and Maria Nano (née Shuteriqi), a government official from the same family as Dhimitër Shuteriqi. He was the only male child among female siblings in the family. He grew up on Hoxha Tahsim Street in East Tirana, attended and graduated from Sami Frasheri High School, reserved for the children of the nomenklatura.

In the early years of adolescence, Nano was eager to learn foreign languages and used to play the guitar. In his second year of high school, he founded a rock group of which he was the lead singer; they played the music of the Beatles, strictly forbidden to the general public at the time. He graduated in Political Economy from the University of Tirana in 1974. After graduation in 1978, Nano worked in the management of the metallurgical mills of Elbasan until 1981.

From 1981 until 1984, Nano served as an economist at Priska's Agricultural Farm in Tirana. In 1984, he was appointed as a researcher of socio-economic problems and reforms of market economies of Eastern Bloc countries at the Institute of Marxist–Leninist Studies in Tirana, where he worked until 1990. When Nano was working at the Marxist–Leninist Institute, he was under the observation of Nexhmije Hoxha, Enver Hoxha's wife. He was singled out as "one of her favorites" during this time.

== Career ==
=== Early political career ===
Nano began his political career in December 1990, where he was first appointed Secretary General of the Council of Ministers. In January 1991, he was promoted to the position of deputy prime Minister, still in the government of Adil Çarçani. The fall of the communist regimes in various Central and Eastern European countries forced President Ramiz Alia to gradually remove the old communist nomenklatura from power and government, so in the end of February 1991, Alia appointed Nano as prime minister of the transitional government with the purpose of organizing the first post-communist democratic elections in the country being held that year and to prepare the transition of the country towards liberal democracy and a market economy.

The Parliamentary Elections were held on 31 March 1991 where the Labour Party of Albania won the majority. Ramiz Alia appointed Nano for the second time as the new prime Minister. However, his new government did not last longer than the first as one week after a general strike organized by the independent unions forced him to resign a couple of weeks later. The 10th Congress of the Labor Party was held in June 1991, which took three important decisions; first it changed the name of Labour Party to Socialist Party, then it expelled all the members of the Politburo, and then it elected Nano as the new leader of the Socialist Party on 13 June 1991.

=== Imprisonment ===
After the Democratic Party of Albania won the parliamentary election of 22 March 1992, the Parliament set up a commission in early 1993 to investigate the activity of Fatos Nano for alleged corruption and abuse with management of humanitarian aid given by the Italian state during the economic crisis that lasted from 1990 until early 1992. On 27 July 1993 the Albanian Parliament approved the request of the General Attorney, Alush Dragoshi to take off the legislative immunity for Nano. On 30 July 1993 Nano was arrested in the office of the Prosecutor, and charged with "abuse of duty and the falsification of official documents in connection with Italian aid" following the use of a single vendor which overcharged and delivered foodstuffs which were unfit for consumption. On 3 April 1994, Nano was sentenced to twelve years in prison.

From the prison, his ex-wife, Rexhina Nano, helped him continue leading the party, and served as an intermediate to other party members, sometimes verbally, sometimes in written form. After imprisonment, Nano decided that the party should be led by three deputy chairmen and one Secretary General to continue the party's political battle.

In 1996, Nano wrote a letter the 2nd Congress of the Party (Keshilli i Pergjithshem Drejtues), held on July–August 1996, to initiate a "Motion for Debate" to remove from the top positions of party anyone who was affiliated in any way with the Labour Party, because Nano thought that the top positions, i.e. the leadership of the party, should be held by intellectuals, like Rexhep Meidani, Pandeli Majko, Kastriot Islami, etc. This was an imperative because it was part of the ongoing process to reform the party in order to join the Socialist International and the Party of European Socialists. The "Motion for Debate", requested by Nano, also required, to implement the recommendations made by State Department, European Parliament and European Council, for the solution of the political and institutional crisis, as official stance of the Socialist Party, also to propose the Congress to remove Marxist and statist concepts from the party's statute and programme, also to deny Vladimir Lenin and Comintern and rehabilitate Karl Kautsky and Second Internationale. The motion was supported by the majority of the socialist members and also by the civil society, and was approved as a consequence by the congress.

In 1997, the collapse of Ponzi schemes marked the beginning of an armed popular revolt against President Berisha, who was forced to resign in July 1997. Berisha called early parliamentary elections on 29 June and he decreed a general amnesty to all prisoners in March 1997; Nano too was released from prison. Nano was found innocent by a court in Tirana for his alleged abuse of power and corruption in 1999.

=== Second and third premierships ===
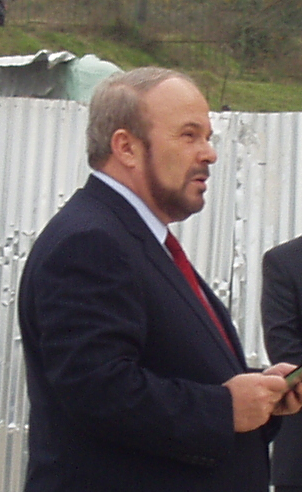
Fatos Nano in 2004

The parliamentary elections of 29 June 1997 were an overwhelming victory for the Socialist Party of Albania. Nano was appointed prime minister by President Rexhep Meidani. The goal of Nano and the socialist government was to rebuild the ruined country, strengthen its economy and reconcile its people divided by political beliefs. On 14 September 1998, during the funeral of Azem Hajdari, leaders and radical followers of the Democratic Party of Albania took part in unrest in Tirana. The events were described by some observers as resembling a "semi coup d’état," though opinions differed on whether they constituted an actual attempt to seize power. The government accused Sali Berisha and his supporters of attempting a coup, while Berisha denied the allegation. To avoid his murder by the angry mob, Nano decided to flee to the government residence in Pogradec.

In the 1990s, Greece preferred and assisted Nano as Albanian leader due to him being Orthodox over Sali Berisha, a Muslim, as Nano was seen as being friendlier to Greek interests. The government of Fatos Nano was viewed by Turkey as having a pro-Greek orientation and expressed some dissatisfaction, though during that time it still maintained close military relations with Albania in rebuilding its armed forces and a military base. During 1998, Albania's Organisation of Islamic Cooperation (OIC) membership was suspended and temporarily withdrawn by Prime Minister Nano, who viewed it as inhibiting Albania's European aspirations. On 28 September 1998 Nano chose to resign and retired from political life.

After the Socialist Party won for the second time, in the parliamentary elections on 24 June 2001, Nano returned to politics again after 2 years of inactivity by starting the movement called Catharsis, with the goal to cripple the agreement between Rama and Meta to share the political power between them for the next 10 years.

In early 2002, Nano unsuccessfully tried to run for President of Albania, but on 25 July 2002, he was appointed by newly elected president Alfred Moisiu as prime minister for the third time. Just days after retaking office in August 2002, Nano came under attack by leading Italian weekly L'Espresso, which accused him of having ties to international organized-crime groups, and having been involved in a cigarette-smuggling ring with Naples-based mobsters. Nano sued the magazine in a court in Rome which ruled in favor of Nano. The court found the article to contain untrue information and speculations with the purpose of harming Nano during his term in office. The news magazine was ordered to pay Nano €3 million, and sentenced the magazine's director Daniela Hamaoi and the authors of the article Claudio Papayani, Dina Nasecti and Giuseppe Roli to 18 months in jail for groundlessly connecting Nano to the crime and mafia in Albania.

In 2004, a number of protests with over 20,000 people were organized by the opposition led by Sali Berisha demanding Nano to resign as prime minister, which came known as the "Nano Go Away" Movement. In 2004, the civil society group Mjaft! protested in front of Nano's office against the alleged import of waste from Italy to Albania.

=== Resignation ===
On 3 July 2005, the Socialist Party lost the elections and its majority in parliament. Nano resigned as prime minister and also as the chairman of the Socialist Party on 1 September 2005. Thereafter, he retired from public and political life. He rarely appeared for interviews on any political talk shows.

=== Presidential candidacy ===
In early 2007, Nano met with Sali Berisha to counter appeals from the Socialist Party to boycott the 2007 local government elections, which would have triggered early parliamentary elections. Nano was elected candidate for president in the Presidential Elections of 2007 by the request of 20 Socialist MPs. Most members of the opposition coalition led by the Socialist Party did not support him, however, and choose to boycott this Presidential Election. Nano received only three votes, while Bamir Topi of the Democratic Party won 75 votes. Topi did not receive enough votes to be elected, however. The second round of voting was held on 10 July. However, the parliament still failed to elect a president, with Nano getting five votes and Topi receiving 74. Continued failure to elect a president would have resulted in an early parliamentary election, but on 20 July, Topi was elected. In late August, it appeared likely that Nano would found a new political party. Nano tried again to run for president in 2012, but he did not even qualify for candidacy because the leaders parties in Parliament obstructed their respective MPs to elect him as a candidate.

=== New movement inside Socialist Party ===
After the election of the President of Albania in June 2012, Nano formed a movement called "Nano Movement for the victory of socialist" with the goal of retaking the leadership of the Socialist Party.

== Death ==
A life-long heavy smoker, Nano died in Tirana on 31 October 2025, at the age of 73, after battling chronic obstructive pulmonary disease for over five years. The Government of Albania, led by Edi Rama, declared Sunday, 2 November 2025, a day of national mourning, during his funeral ceremony. Family members, friends, citizens, representatives of state institutions, religious communities, and the diplomatic corps attended the ceremony. Hundreds of participants placed white carnations on the coffin, which was covered with a national flag. The funeral included a performance of "My Way" by Frank Sinatra, reported to have been Nano's favorite song.

== Bibliography ==
The early life of Nano was narrated in the only biography for him, the Albanian language Të jetosh kohën, written by his ex-wife Rexhina Nano and published in early 2008, and also by Nano himself in his interview with journalist Blendi Fevziu during two episodes of the Opinion talk show, which aired on TV Klan (Episode 1 and Episode 2). Nano had a degree in political economy and a Ph.D. in economics from the University of Tirana. He published three books:

- Socialimperializmi sovjetik në ekonominë kapitaliste botërore (1987)
- Die Sowjetunion: ein kapitalistisches, imperialistisches Land (1988)
- Dosja Nano (1994)

== See also ==
- Fall of communism in Albania

Party political offices
New office	Leader of the Socialist Party; 1991–2005	Succeeded by Edi Rama
Political offices
Preceded by Adil Çarçani	Prime Minister of Albania; 1991	Succeeded by Ylli Bufi
Preceded by Bashkim Fino	Prime Minister of Albania; 1997–1998	Succeeded by Pandeli Majko
Preceded by Pandeli Majko	Prime Minister of Albania; 2002–2005	Succeeded by Sali Berisha
