= Beqir Balluku =

Albanian politician (1917–1975)

Minister of People's Defence
- In office 1 August 1953 – 28 October 1974
- Prime Minister: Mehmet Shehu; Enver Hoxha
- Preceded by: Enver Hoxha
- Succeeded by: Mehmet Shehu

Personal details
- Born: Beqir Ali Balluku; 14 February 1917 Tirana, Principality of Albania
- Died: 5 November 1975 (aged 58) Tirana, PR Albania

Military service
- Branch/service: Albanian People's Army
- Years of service: 32
- Rank: Lieutenant General
- Battles/wars: World War II in Albania; Greek Civil War; Vietnam War; Albanian–Soviet split

Beqir Ali Balluku (14 February 1917 – 5 November 1975) was an Albanian politician, military leader, and Minister of Defense of Albania. Balluku assisted Enver Hoxha in carrying out the 1956 purge within the Party of Labour. However, in 1974, Balluku himself, along with a group of other government members was accused by Hoxha of an attempted coup d'état against the People's Republic of Albania. He was executed the next year.

== Biography ==
Balluku was born on 14 February 1917 in Tirana, Albania. He studied at a technical high school in Tirana. While he was doing his military service, he joined the ranks of the Albanian resistance against the Axis during the partisan war in Albania.

On 20 May 1943 he was appointed commander of the Communist partisan battalion "Krujë Ishëm", and on 18 September 1943 he was named commissar of the third brigade. Later he was appointed commander of the second brigade.

On 28 January 1948 Balluku was named Chief of the Head Command of the Albanian Army. In 1948, in the first Congress of the Party of Labour of Albania (formerly the Communist Party of Albania), he was elected as a member of the Politburo, a post he held until his arrest, and in 1952 he was named Minister of Defense. One year later he gained the military rank of Lieutenant General. From 1948 to 1974 he was a member of the Albanian parliament.

In 1953 he graduated from the Marshal Voroshilov Military Academy of the USSR Army General Staff. Earlier, in December 1952 the Yugoslav State radio of Belgrade and the newspaper Politika had announced that he had been killed and his family interned, but it turned out that it was just speculation: he had been busy with his studies in Moscow.

In 1956 Balluku was presiding over the municipality of Tirana Conference of the Communist Party when the opponents of the Enver Hoxha - Mehmet Shehu regime nearly overthrew the government. Balluku informed Nexhmije Hoxha (Hoxha's wife) that Enver Hoxha should return from the holidays and keep the situation under control.

Shehu and Balluku's intervention helped cause the 1956 purge of the Albanian Communist Party. After Hoxha returned to Tirana, he first tried to be conciliatory towards his critics and then he retaliated by ordering the arrest of all of those who had spoken up. The troika Hoxha-Shehu-Balluku was so described by Nikita Khrushchev, then First Secretary of the Communist Party of the Soviet Union:

The Albanians are worse than beasts – they are monsters. Only later did we learn how the Albanian Communist leaders punished and eliminated members of their own Party. They had a sort of troika: Hoxha, Shehu and Balluku. These three used to bring someone to trial, and Enver Hoxha and Mehmet Shehu would sentence the accused to death themselves, without ever putting anything in writing; then they would look for an opportunity to have their victim murdered secretly, and Balluku would personally carry out the execution. It was all very similar to the system used by Joseph Stalin and Lavrentiy Beria.

In 1960, following the Sino-Soviet split, Balluku, as a representative of the Albanian Party of Labour, took a strong pro-China and anti-Soviet stand in his speech at the Congress of the North Vietnam Communist Party.

== Coup d'état accusation, arrest, and execution ==
In July 1974, after 22 uninterrupted years of service as the Minister of Defense of the People's Republic of Albania, Balluku himself was accused by Enver Hoxha of instigating revisionist ideas and was put on trial, accused of a military coup d'état and high treason against his own country. Balluku was sentenced to death along with Petrit Dume, Hito Çako and Rrahman Perrllaku.

Political analysts and scholars seem to agree that Hoxha was aware of the military establishment's desire to decrease the Party's influence in the areas of the military and the economy. Their attempt to downgrade Hoxha's concept of the people's war was rewarded when Hoxha deposed the entire top level of the military establishment, including the Minister of Defense, Balluku. Hoxha seems to have feared a coup d'état. Balluku was then ranked as the fourth member of the ruling Communist Party (after Enver Hoxha, Mehmet Shehu and Hysni Kapo)

In the 6 October 1974 elections for the People's Assembly, Balluku was the only leading Albanian politician not reelected (in his home district of Shkodër). The removal of Balluku from the Albanian Politburo had already been disclosed in a report from Belgrade on 11 September 1974.

Twelve days later, John A. Volpe, the US Ambassador to Italy, reported through a telegram sent to Washington that it was possible that Balluku and other high defense functionaries had been removed from their posts. The first indication was a discrepancy between Hoxha's and Balluku's opinions on the defense system of Albania; the second was a request from Beijing to Hoxha that he remove Balluku, who was making too many requests on weapons imports from People's Republic of China. The third possibility was the coup d'état intent of Balluku, possibly endorsed by the other pro-Soviet Union defense high functionaries.

Balluku was executed by firing squad on 5 November 1975.

Balluku's remains were retrieved only 26 years later, on 18 July 2000, on request of his family members. He had been put in a secret common grave in Vranisht, Vlorë County, together with the other two former Albanian generals (Dume and Çako) who had also been accused by Hoxha in 1974.

In 1979, following the ideological split of the Party of Labour of Albania from the Chinese Communist Party, Enver Hoxha wrote in his memoirs that the "enemy groups" of Abdyl Këllezi (Minister of the Economy) and Beqir Balluku (Minister of Defense) had drafted their inimical plan based on suggestions from Zhou Enlai, who was Premier of the People's Republic of China.

== Sources ==
- Pearson, Owen (2007). Albania in the Twentieth Century, A History: Volume III: Albania as Dictatorship and Democracy, 1945–99. IB Taurus. ISBN 9781845111052.
- Boriçi, Kujtim (November 2007). "Enver: For high Treason, Balluku, Dume e Çako to Military Trial! (Albanian: Enveri: Për tradhti të lartë, Balluku, Dume e Çako në gjyq ushtarak!)". Shekulli (November 3, 2007). Archived from the original on 2008-02-07.
- Boriçi, Kujtim (October 2007). "Enver Hoxha: Here's why Beqir Balluku is an Enemy (Albanian: Enver Hoxha: "Ja pse është armik Beqir Balluku!")". Shekulli (October 8, 2007). Archived from the original on March 30, 2010.
- Boriçi, Kujtim (January 2010). "Enver Hoxha: Here's how Beqir Balluku was a hypocrite (Albanian: Enver Hoxha: Si ma dridhte llafin Beqir Balluku)". Shekulli (January 28, 2010). Archived from the original on January 13, 2011.
- Boriçi, Kujtim (January 2010). "Hoxha: Here's how we are going to heal Beqir Balluku (Albanian: Hoxha: Ja si do ta shërojmë ne Beqirin)". Shekulli (January 29, 2010). Archived from the original on March 28, 2010.
- Boriçi, Kujtim (February 2010). "The Accuse: Dume's Plan to Annichilate the Central Committee and the Party's Leadership (Albanian: Akuza: Plani i Dumes për të asgjësuar Komitetin Qendror dhe udhëheqjen)". Shekulli (February 1, 2010). Archived from the original on March 13, 2010.
- Boriçi, Kujtim (February 2010). "Hoxha: Here are the Sentences for the Traitor Generals (Albanian: Hoxha: Ja dënimet për gjeneralët tradhtarë)". Shekulli (February 2, 2010). Archived from the original on March 30, 2010.
