= Llambi Gegprifti =

Albanian politician (1942–2023)

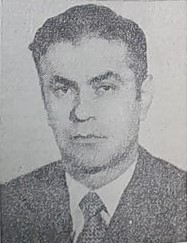

Llambi Gegprifti (14 February 1942 – 1 May 2023) was an Albanian politician who was the mayor of Tirana (precisely Chairman of the Executive Committee of the People's Council of Tirana District) from 1986 through 1987 and 1989 through 1990. He was candidate-member of the Politburo of the Party of Labour of Albania for terms of 1971, 1976, 1981, and 1986 (the last one).

== Life and career ==
Llambi Gegprifti was born in Pogradec on 14 February 1942.

In July 1974, Gegprifti was elected Deputy Minister of Defense. Together with Hekuran Isai, Pali Miska, and Qirjako Mihali he was one of the new generation of leaders within the Party of Labour of Albania. In 1978 he was elected member (representing Pogradec District) and first deputy of the People's Assembly (Alb: Kuvendi Popullor). On 15 January 1982 he was appointed as Minister of Industry and Mines in the first government of Prime Minister Adil Çarçani, position he held until 23 November 1982. From 20 February 1987 to 2 February 1989, he was again Minister of Industry and Mines in the third Çarçani Government. On 13 December 1993 he has sentenced to 8 years in prison by a special court in Post-communist Albania for "funds abuse". He served only one year in prison and was released by the Court of Appeal on 30 November 1994. Gegprifti left Albania in 1995.

On September 29, 1996, the Tirana district court accused nine former senior PPSH of "having committed crimes against humanity in cooperation with one another", specifically "...being in high Party and state posts, they have acted not on the basis of laws but have satisfied their passions and unjust instructions". The nine defendants received the following sentences: Llambi Gegprifti, Shkelqim Bajraktari and Nazmi Domi 20 years in jail, Irakli Vero and Veiz Haderi 16 years in jail, Suljeman Abazi, Idajet Beqiri, Lenka Çuko and Agron Tafa with 15 years of imprisonment. Gegprifti and four others were sentenced in absentia. All received the minimum term of sentences after the law on the crimes against humanity in cooperation with one other. The charges were dropped later after the turmoils of 1997.

Llambi Gegprifti died on 1 May 2023, at the age of 81.
