= Rita Marko =

Albanian politician (1920–2018)

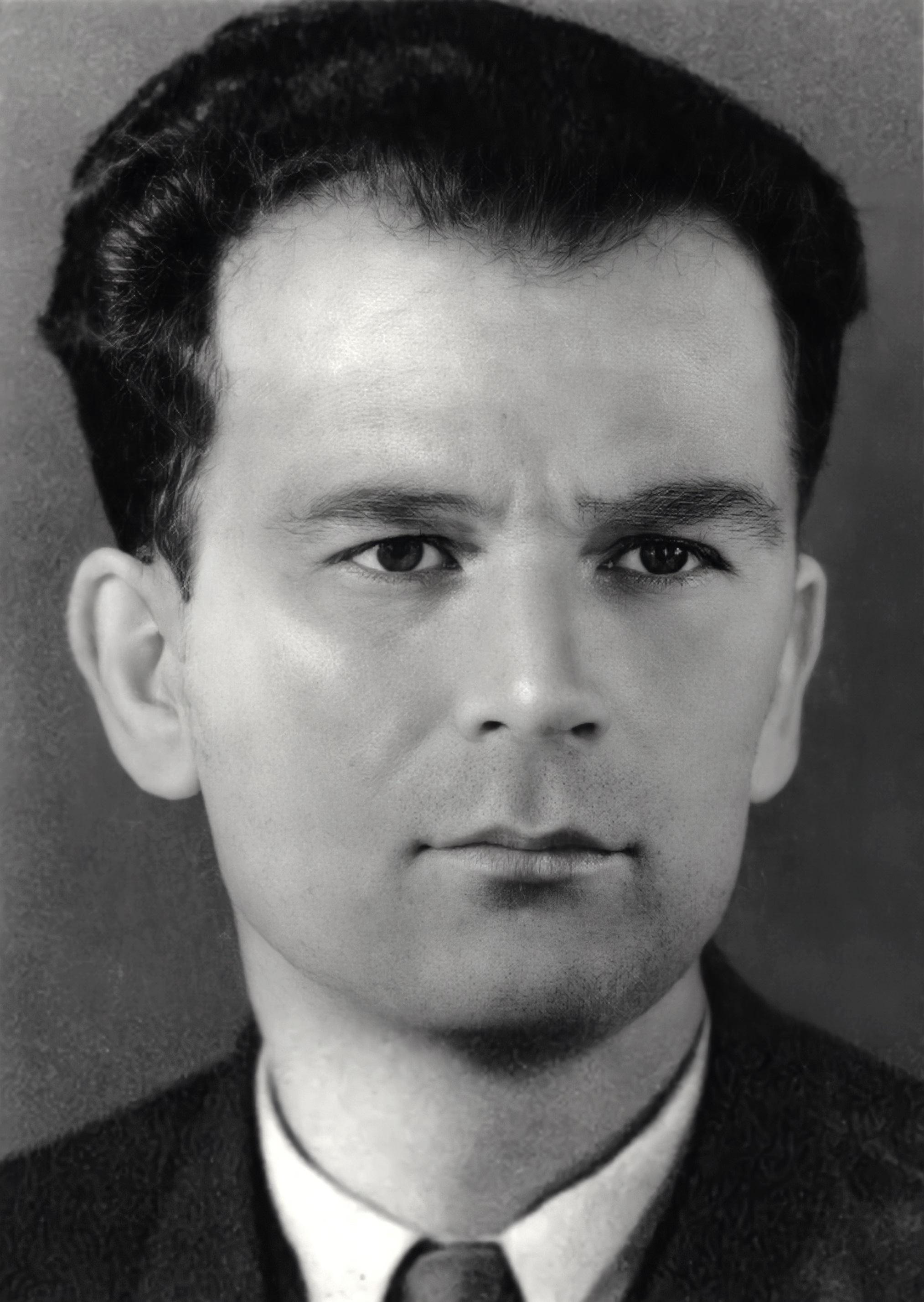

19th Speaker of the Parliament of Albania
- In office 1956–1958
- Preceded by: Gogo Nushi
- Succeeded by: Medar Shtylla

Personal details
- Born: 17 February 1920 Dishnicë, Korçë, Principality of Albania
- Died: 15 June 2018 (aged 98) Tirana, Albania
- Party: Party of Labour of Albania
- Relations: Anastas Mihallari (Grandfather), Pushi (Uncle)
- Parent(s): Sterjos Marko (Father), Parashqevi Marko (nee Mihallari) (Mother)

Rita Marko (17 February 1920 – 15 June 2018) was an Albanian politician who served in a number of positions in Albania during its socialist period.

== Biography ==
Rita Marko was of Aromanian origin, with his father hailing from Bunavi in Vlorë County of pro-Albanian leanings. Later they settled in Voskopojë. He was a shepherd. Rita's mother, Parashqevi, was the daughter of teacher Anastas Mihallari, and her family originated from Ioannina, now in Greece. Rita's family was victim of raids on Voskopojë by marauding bands, in which many local civilians, including his uncle Pushi, were killed. His family had to flee Voskopojë as a result, and he would later describe his lament for the destruction of the "cultural monument" that Voskopojë was as he described it.

In 1936, Marko partook in a strike of petroleum workers organized by the Puna (Work) trade union in the area, which was associated with the Korçë Communist Group. He joined the resistance forces after the Italian invasion of Albania in 1939 and joined the Communist Party of Albania (from 1948 the Party of Labour of Albania) in 1942. During the war he served in secession as company and later battalion commissar of the Fourth Partisan Brigade, commissar of the Twelfth Partisan Brigade, commissar of the Eighth People's Defense Brigade and up to 1948 regimental commissar in the Security Forces with the rank of Major.

He became a deputy to the People's Assembly in 1950 and a member of its Presidium in 1952. From 1956 to 1958 he served as Chairman of the Assembly and Vice-Chairman from 1966 to 1976. From July 1950 to March 1951 he served as Minister of Industry. In 1952 he became a member of the General Council of the Trade Unions of Albania and served as its Chairman from 1970 to 1982.

In April 1950 he became a candidate member of the Central Committee of the PLA, full member at the Second Party Congress in 1952 and a member of the Politburo at the Third Congress in 1956. He served as First Secretary of the Party committee in Korçë district from 1949 to 1950 and of the Durrës Party committee from 1966 to 1970. In March 1951 he became Secretary of the Party's Central Committee.

In December 1991 he was arrested and put on trial in July 1994 alongside some other prominent PLA leaders, being sentenced to eight years in prison after being accused of abuse of power. He was released in July 1995.

== Sources ==
- Zholi, Albert (2018). "Rita Marko dhe fjala "bolshevizëm" [Rita Marko and the word "bolshevism"] (Excerpts from the published notebooks of Rita Marko)". Albanian Free Press.
