= Fall of communism in Albania =

Collapse of communist control of Albania in the early 1990s

- Part of Revolutions of 1989
- The toppling of Enver Hoxha's statue in Skanderbeg Square, Tirana (20 February 1991)
- Date: January 1990 – 22 March 1992
- Location: Albania

Territory of former Eastern Bloc states with the years when their communist rule ended. For the former republics of the Soviet Union, years in which they declared independence.

The fall of communism in Albania, sometimes called "De-Enverization", the last such event in Europe outside the Soviet Union, started in December 1990 with student demonstrations in the capital, Tirana, although protests started in January that year in other cities like Shkodër and Kavajë. The Central Committee of the communist Party of Labour of Albania allowed political pluralism on 11 December and the largest opposition party, the Democratic Party, was founded the next day. March 1991 elections left the Party of Labour in power, but a general strike and urban opposition led to the formation of a "stability government" that included non-communists. Albania's former communists were routed in elections in March 1992 amid economic collapse and social unrest, with the Democratic Party winning most seats and its party head, Sali Berisha, becoming president.

== Background ==
Enver Hoxha, who ruled the People's Socialist Republic of Albania for four decades, died on 11 April 1985. Ramiz Alia succeeded Hoxha as the First Secretary of the Party of Labour, and gradually softened the edges of what had been one of the most unreconstructed Communist regimes in Europe. Alia introduced economic reforms and opened diplomatic ties with Western European countries.

During the revolutions of 1989, many Albanians remained unaware of events because of state controlled information in the isolated country. Some Albanians did not know that the Berlin Wall had fallen in November 1989.

In January 1990, the first revolts started in Shkodra, where a few hundred people wanted to demolish Joseph Stalin's statue, and from there they spread to a few other cities. Eventually, the existing regime introduced some liberalization, including measures in 1990 providing for freedom to travel abroad. Efforts were begun to improve ties with the outside world. Nevertheless, it was clear that the transition to democracy could not be stopped.

Mikhail Gorbachev had adopted new policies of glasnost and perestroika in the Soviet Union in 1985. After Nicolae Ceaușescu, the communist leader of Romania, was executed during the Romanian Revolution of 1989, Alia knew that he might be next if radical changes were not made. He then signed the Helsinki Agreement which then forced conformity to Western European human rights standards. Alia also organized a meeting with leading intellectuals of the time on ways to reform the Albanian political system. In December 1990, the Party of Labour gave up its "leading role," clearing the way for the first pluralist elections since the communists took power in Albania in 1944. Alia's party won the election of 31 March 1991.

Many leading members of the newly formed Democratic Party wore light trench coats during demonstrations, while Sali Berisha, then still a Party of Labour member, was heard thanking Ramiz Alia when addressing the students protests, and was seen driving around Skanderbeg Square with a government vehicle. Meanwhile, a student demonstration was crushed by the state police in Tirana's Student City dormitories. Ramiz Alia invited a delegation of University of Tirana students to discuss their concerns and come up with a compromise.

The communists managed to retain control of the government in the first round of elections, but fell two months later during a general strike. A committee of "national salvation" took over but also collapsed within six months. Alia resigned as president and was succeeded by Berisha, the first democratically elected leader of Albania since Bishop Fan Noli.

== Post-communist government ==
The change from communism to capitalism had many challenges. The Democratic Party had to implement the reforms it had promised, but they were either too slow or did not solve the nation's problems, resulting in people disappointed when their hopes for fast prosperity went unfulfilled. Many Albanians were also frustrated by Sali Berisha's growing authoritarianism, including pressure on the opposition, media and civil society. In the general elections of June 1996, the Democratic Party tried to win an absolute majority and manipulated the results.

The 1997 Albanian civil unrest caused the government to fall after the collapse of a number of large "pyramid schemes" (more accurately, Ponzi schemes) and widespread corruption in Albania, which caused disorder and rebellion throughout the country. The government attempted to suppress the revolt by force but the attempt failed, due to low morale and corruption in the military of Albania. With the help of international mediation led by OSCE special envoy Franz Vranitzky, the ruling and opposition parties agreed to form a Reconciliation Government and to hold new elections. To secure calm and to prevent an outward refugee flow, nine states contributed military forces to an international force called Operation Alba.

The 1997 Albanian parliamentary elections in June brought the opposition Socialist Party (former Communist Party) to power, and it ruled under various Prime Ministers until 2005. The Democratic Party won parliamentary elections in 2005 and 2009, and Albania was governed again by Sali Berisha, this time as Prime Minister. The Socialist Party won the elections in 2013, and is governed by its party leader and Prime Minister Edi Rama.

According to the constitution, approved by referendum on 22 November 1998, promulgated on 28 November 1998, and amended in January 2007, Albania has a democratic system of government with separation of powers and protection of fundamental human rights.

Since the end of Communism, the country became more aligned towards the West than its, albeit unenthused, relations with Russia or China. Albania joined NATO in 2009 and began formal negotiations to join the European Union in 2022.

== See also ==
- 1991 Albanian Exodus to Italy
- Fatos Nano
- Lamerica
