= Gogo Nushi =

Albanian politician (1913–1970)

18th Speaker of the Parliament of Albania
- In office 15 July 1954 – 14 November 1956
- Preceded by: Mihal Prifti
- Succeeded by: Rita Marko

Personal details
- Born: January 15, 1913 Vuno, Himara, Albania
- Died: December 4, 1970 (aged 57) Tirana, Albania

Gogo Nushi (February 15, 1913 – December 4, 1970) was an Albanian politician who served in a number of positions in Albania during its socialist period. His brother was Kozma Nushi.

== Biography ==
Nushi was born in Vuno a village in the Himara region in 1913. He attended a grammar school in his youth. In 1928 he became an emigrant with his father for reasons of economic difficulties at home, settling in Lyon, France, where he worked as a factory laborer. In these conditions he involved himself in left-wing activity among émigré Albanian intellectuals and in 1935 became a member of the French Communist Party. In response to the Italian invasion of Albania in 1939 he returned to the country a year later, where he became a founding member of the Communist Party of Albania and played an active role in the partisan resistance during World War II. He headed the Party organization of Tirana throughout this period, using his prior experience among the French working class to organize Albanian workers and youth for the resistance, and was intermittently arrested and released by the occupation authorities in the process. He later served in political positions within the First, Second and Fourth Combat Divisions.

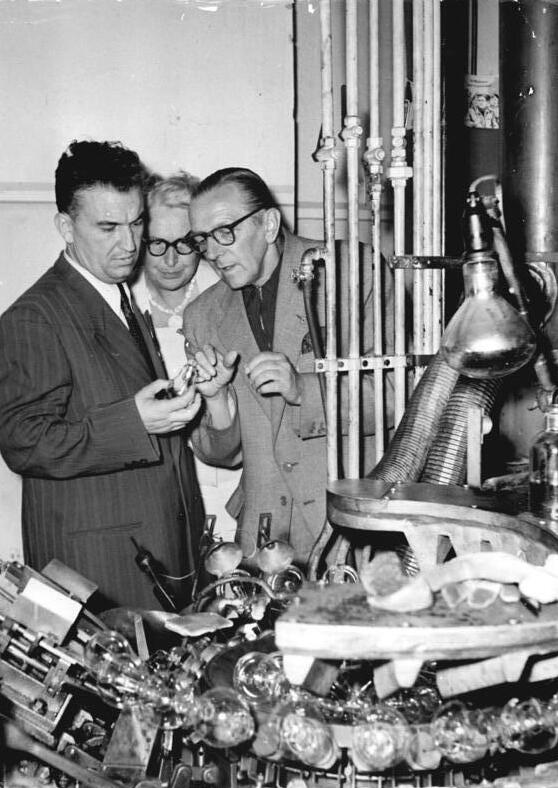
Gogo Nushi (left), during a tour of the Berlin lightbulb factory.

In May 1944 he was elected to the Presidium of the Anti-Fascist National Liberation Council at the Congress of Përmet. In 1945 he became a member of the Provisional General Council of the Workers' Syndicates of Albania and a deputy to the Constituent (later People's) Assembly from Tirana, becoming a member of its Presidium in 1950. He served as Chairman of the Assembly from 1950–56 and Vice-Chairman from 1962-70. From 1951 to 1958 he served as Vice-Chairman of the Council of Ministers. In 1946 he became a member of the General Council of the Democratic Front and its Vice-Chairman from 1950 onwards. From 1947-48 and 1953-62 he was Minister of Trade and from 1948-49 he served as Minister of Industry. He was President of the Trade Unions of Albania from 1949 to 1951 and again from 1958 to 1970.

In 1943, he was a participant at the Labinot Conference of the Party where he became a member of its Central Committee. Later in 1948, he was elected to the Politburo on the occasion of the Party's First Congress. In 1954, he became Secretary of the Central Committee.

From 1980 to 1982, a three-volume Vepra të zgjedhura (Selected Works) of his writings and speeches from 1943 onwards was published.
