= Ramiz Alia =

Head of state of Albania from 1982 to 1992

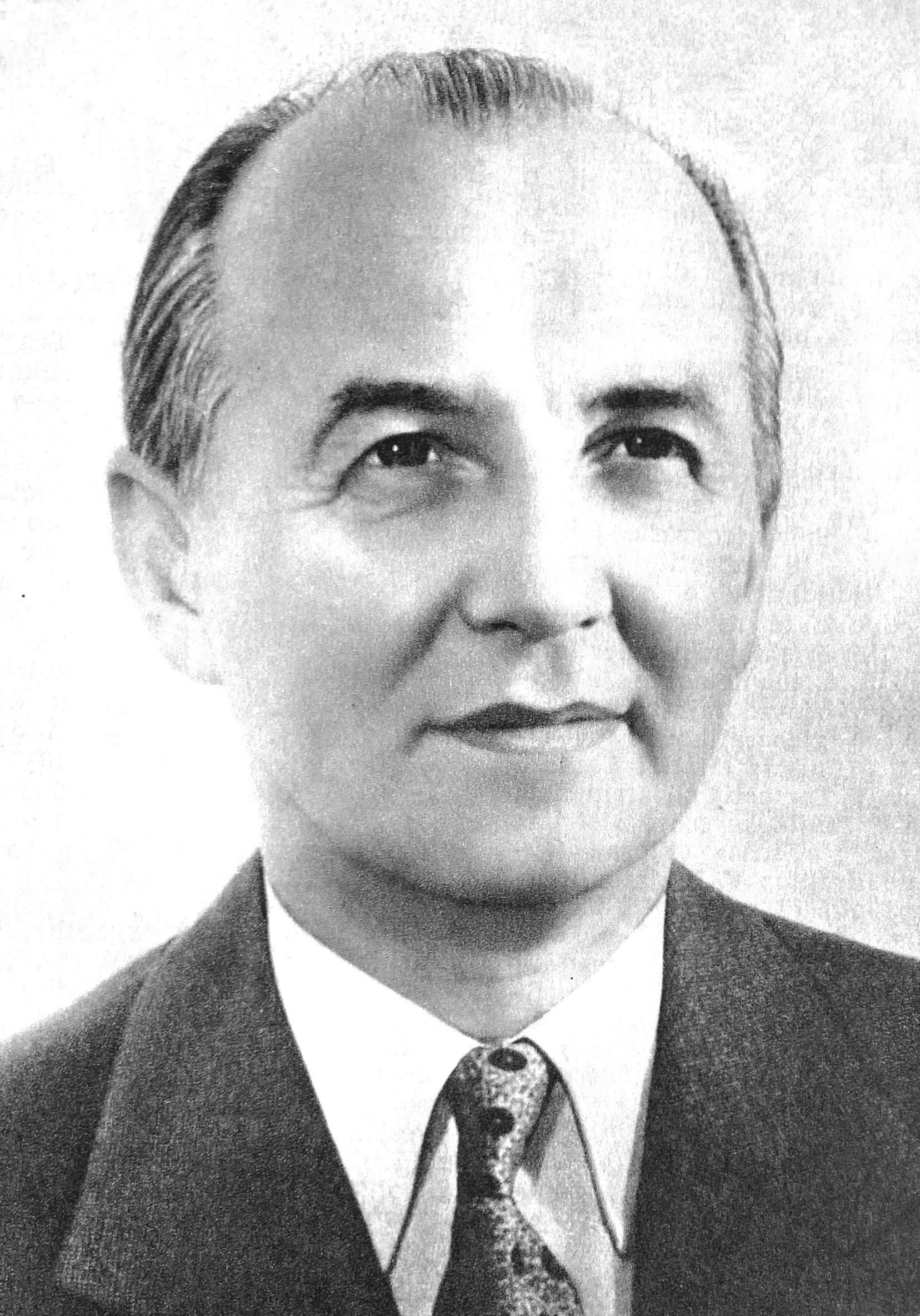
- Official portrait, 1985

First Secretary of the Party of Labour of Albania
- In office 13 April 1985 – 13 June 1991
- Preceded by: Enver Hoxha
- Succeeded by: Position abolished

Chairman of the Presidium of the Albanian People's Assembly
- In office 22 November 1982 – 30 April 1991
- Leader: Enver Hoxha (First Secretary)
- Preceded by: Haxhi Lleshi
- Succeeded by: Himself as President

President of Albania
- In office 30 April 1991 – 3 April 1992
- Prime Minister: Fatos Nano; Ylli Bufi; Vilson Ahmeti
- Preceded by: Himself as Chairman of the Presidium of the People's Assembly
- Succeeded by: Sali Berisha

Personal details
- Born: 18 October 1925 Shkodër, First Albanian Republic
- Died: 7 October 2011 (aged 85) Tirana, Albania
- Party: Party of Labour (1943–1991); Socialist Party (1991–2011)
- Spouse: Semiramis Xhuvani (died 1986)
- Children: 3
- Relatives: Aleksandër Xhuvani (father-in-law)
- De facto leader of Albania: ← Enver Hoxha; (Last in role) →

Ramiz Alia (Note: Albanian pronunciation: [ɾaˈmiz aˈli.a]) (18 October 1925 – 7 October 2011) was an Albanian politician serving as the second and last leader of the People's Socialist Republic of Albania from 1985 to 1991, serving as First Secretary of the Party of Labour of Albania. He was also the country's head of state from 1982 to 1992. He had been seen as a successor by Enver Hoxha and took power after Hoxha died.

== Early life and politics ==
Alia was born on 18 October 1925, in Shkodër to Gheg Albanian parents who were Muslim. They fled persecution in Yugoslavia. He grew up and spent his childhood in Tirana. In the early part of World War II, Alia was a member of a fascist youth organisation known as the Fascist Lictor Youth Organisation but joined the underground Albanian Communist Youth Organisation in 1941. In 1943, he became a member of the Albanian Communist Party. He had risen rapidly under Hoxha's patronage, and was elected to the Central Committee in 1948, and in 1956, was named a candidate member of the Politburo. By 1961, he was made a full member of the Politburo (Politburo of the Party of Labour of Albania). Alia distinguished himself as the chief ideologist in the social and cultural fields for the Party of Labour of Albania, specifically during the years of the Cultural and Ideological Revolution.

Although Hoxha never designated an official successor, there were clear signs that he favoured Alia. In introducing Alia to one of his doctors, Hoxha said "My friend, I'm getting old, and my health is not the best it could be. Younger comrades, like this one [Alia], will step in."

== Political career ==
=== First Secretary of the Albanian Labour Party ===
After World War II, Alia resumed his duties in the Communist Youth Organisation, and at the First Congress of the Albanian Party of Labour in November 1948, he was elected to its Central Committee and was assigned to the department of agitation and propaganda.

As late as 1988, Alia had continued insisting that Hoxha was the only statesman in decades who stayed loyal to Marxism-Leninism, claiming in his speech at the unveiling of Hoxha's statue in Skanderbeg Square: "Enver Hoxha has been and remains to this day the only name among the communist leaders of the last 4 to 5 decades who defended the teachings of Marxism-Leninism, the ideals of the revolution and socialism, both in theory and practice."

=== Transition to multi-party system and presidency ===
Despite Alia's efforts to proceed with change on a limited, cautious basis, reform from above threatened to turn into reform from below, largely because of the increasingly vocal demands of Albania's youth. On 9 December 1990, student demonstrators marched from the Enver Hoxha University (now University of Tirana) at Tirana through the streets of the capital shouting slogans and demanding reforms. By 11 December, the number of participants had reached almost 3,000. In an effort to quell the student unrest, which had led to clashes with riot police, Alia met with the students and agreed to take further steps toward democratization. The students informed Alia that they wanted to create an independent political organisation of students and youth. Alia's response was that such an organisation had to be registered with the Ministry of Justice.

In his traditional New Year's message to the Albanian people, Alia welcomed the changes that had been occurring in the country and claimed that 1991 would be a turning point in terms of the economy.

Alia was a crucial figure in the peaceful political transition of the early 1990s. Many believe that he helped the rise to power of the anti-communist opposition forces, thus eliminating possible bloodshed. He managed to remain a key political figure throughout several political crises. Nonetheless, with Albania in the throes of a grave economic crisis, Alia had to face challenges that he could not surmount. On 12 December 1990, he signed a law allowing political pluralism, on which he would later comment as his life's greatest failure. In the 1991 elections, the first democratic elections in the country, where Alia ran for Member of National Parliament in a constituency in the capital, which was a stronghold of the communist party, he was badly defeated by a surprising majority of 61% by the renowned mining engineer in the country, Franko Kroqi. Kroqi ran as a candidate of the newly formed Democratic Party of Albania, although he never became a party member.

After this loss, and later on the Democratic Party of Albania's landslide victory in the spring 1992 general election, he resigned as president on 3 April 1992. On 9 April the People's Assembly elected DPA leader Sali Berisha as Albania's new head of state.

== Arrest ==
On 21 May 1994, senior officials from the Communist government, including Ramiz Alia, went on trial. Alia was charged with abuse of power and misappropriation of state funds, as was prime minister Adil Çarçani, deputy prime minister Manush Myftiu, and Rita Marko who was a vice-president.

Alia had been placed under house arrest in August 1992 and his detention was converted into imprisonment in August 1993. In court he claimed he was the victim of a political show trial and demanded that the trial be broadcast on television, a request denied by the presiding judge. The trial was monitored by a Human Rights Watch representative and proceeded with only minor due process irregularities. The ten defendants were found guilty as charged and sentenced to between three and nine years in prison; Alia received a nine-year sentence.

A court of appeals subsequently reduced some of the sentences, notably Alia's to five years. Alia, Myftiu, Carçani, Stefani and Isai were also ordered to repay various sums to the state. On 30 November, the Court of Cassation reduced Alia's term by an additional three years. On 7 July 1995, Ramiz Alia was freed from prison. However, his freedom was short-lived and in 1996 he was charged with committing crimes against humanity during his term, and was imprisoned anew in March. The trial against him began on 18 February 1997, but he escaped from the prison following the unrest in the country and the desertion of the guards. Amid the unrest he appeared on state TV in an exclusive interview with Blendi Fevziu. In December 1997 he returned to Albania after escaping briefly to France to join his family during the Albanian unrest. In the late 2000s, he was sometimes seen travelling to Albania from Dubai to give interviews or publicize his books.

== Personal life and death ==
Alia was married to Semiramis Xhuvani, with whom he had three children: Zana, Besa, and Arben. Xhuvani, who was the daughter of Aleksandër Xhuvani, died in 1986.

Alia died on 7 October 2011 in Tirana.

== Legacy ==
Alia's legacy remains polarizing with some dissidents accusing him of continuing on Hoxha's repressive practices (such as the execution of dissidents in labour camps) while others have praised him for peacefully dissolving the monopolistic hold of power of the Party of Labour and avoiding bloodshed and civil war as seen in Romania previously. Some Western observers compared Alia to Mikhail Gorbachev of the Soviet Union for his failed attempts at reforming the stagnant economy of Albania during his tenure.

== See also ==
- List of presidents of Albania

== Bibliography ==
- Alia, Ramiz. Jeta ime: Kujtime, Tirana, Toena: 2010

Political offices
Preceded by	Minister of Education and Culture; 1955–1958	Succeeded by
Preceded by Enver Hoxha	First Secretary of the Albanian Party of Labour; 1985–1991	Succeeded by End of Communist rule
Preceded by Haxhi Lleshi	Chairman of the Presidium of the Albanian People's Assembly; 1982–1991	Succeeded by Himself as President
Preceded by Himself as Chairman of the Presidium of the People's Assembly	President of Albania; 1991–1992	Succeeded by Sali Berisha
