= Adil Çarçani =

Albanian politician (1922–1997)

24th Prime Minister of Albania
- In office 18 December 1981 – 22 February 1991
- Preceded by: Mehmet Shehu
- Succeeded by: Fatos Nano

Personal details
- Born: 5 May 1922 Fushëbardhë, Albania
- Died: 13 October 1997 (aged 75) Tirana, Albania
- Party: Party of Labour of Albania

Adil Çarçani (5 May 1922 – 13 October 1997) was an Albanian politician who served as the 24th Prime Minister of Albania during the Communist era led by Enver Hoxha. He served as the titular head of the Albanian government in the years immediately preceding the fall of Communism.

== Biography ==
Çarçani was born on 5 May 1922, in the village of Fushëbardhë, near Gjirokastër. During World War II, he fought for Partisan forces against the Italian fascists, and joined the Communist Party and the government that it set up after the war. He became mining minister in the 1950s, joined the Politburo of the Party of Labour of Albania in the 1960s, and by 1981 had become First Deputy Prime Minister.

On 18 December 1981, immediately after the violent death of Mehmet Shehu, Çarçani became the 24th Prime Minister of Albania. He remained in that position until February 1991, two months after Communism started falling in Albania, when he resigned after mobs tore down the statue of Enver Hoxha, the founder and leader of Communist Albania from 1946 to 1985. Çarçani was, however, elected to parliament that year, and gave the opening speech.

== Post-1991 ==
On 21 May 1994, Çarçani was tried for and abuse of power, alongside Ramiz Alia. He was tried, found guilty and sentenced to prison. His sentence was commuted to five years of house arrest, however, as he was beginning to suffer from health problems. He died under house arrest in Tirana.

Political offices
Preceded by Mehmet Shehu	Chairman of the Council of Ministers of Albania; 1981–1991	Succeeded by Fatos Nano
