= Xhixho =

Xhixho is an Albanian surname. Notable people with the surname include:

- Erisa Xhixho (born 1985), Albanian politician and deputy
- Pano Xhixho (1916–1946), Albanian partisan commander and martyr
- Thoma Xhixho (1920–2002), Albanian Army, military scientist, founder and first commander of the Albanian Military Academy
