= Skanderbeg Military University =

Military university in Albania

The Skanderbeg Military University (Albanian: Universiteti Ushtarak “Skënderbej”) was an educational entity of the Albanian People's Army and the Albanian Armed Forces. It was the oldest military education institution in the People's Socialist Republic of Albania.

== History ==
=== Communist era ===
It was established on 8 November 1944 as a low-level training course for officers of the National Liberation Movement. This was during the German occupation of Albania. It was housed in the buildings of the engineering department built by the Italian Army. In January 1945, it moved to the capital of Tirana, months after the Liberation of Albania. It moved to the buildings of the Military Department N. 1105 in Tirana, on what is now Myslim Keta Street. The first commander of this school was Lieutenant Colonel Irfan Peshtani. By order of the Ministry of People's Defense, the school accepted students from the Skanderbeg Military High School and from the districts of Albania. On 8 January 1949, it was renamed to the Enver Hoxha United School of Officers (Albanian: Shkolla e Bashkuar e Oficerëve “Enver Hoxha”). Graduates received a bachelor's degree and became commissioned as lieutenants. Many have led higher military structures as generals. From 1972 to 1983, it passed to the three-year system, and in 1984, it switched to a four-year higher education system.

On 22–23 February 1991, a meeting of hard-line communists took place at the school, sparking rumors of a possible coup d'état. As a result, a pro-democracy crowd gathered outside the school, prompting soldiers to shoot into the crowd below, killing four. A member of the military police was also killed amidst the tensions.

=== Post-1991 ===
In 1995 the United High School of Officers reverted to the 3-year system and was renamed the Skanderbeg Military Academy (Albanian: Akademia Ushtarake "Skënderbej"). In October 2003, the Skanderbeg Military University was established by merging into a single institution the Skanderbeg Military University, the Naval Academy and the Aviation Academy. In September 2004, it consisted of 2 faculties:

- the Faculty of Economics
- the Department of Business Management and the Faculty of Electronic Engineering

Today, the Center for Foreign Languages and the Faculty of General Education of the Armed Forces Academy come from the remnants of the former Skanderbeg Military Academy.

== Notable alumni and faculty ==
- Bujar Nishani, 7th President of Albania
- Kiço Mustaqi, Minister of Defence in 1991
- Alfred Moisiu, 5th President of Albania
- Iliriana Sulkuqi, Albanian poet
- Drini Nikolla, deputy director of Defense Planning

== See also ==
- Skanderbeg (military unit)
