= Albanian Armed Forces Band =

The band's logo

The Albania Armed Forces Band (Albanian: Orkestra e Forcave të Armatosura të Shqipërisë, OFAS) is a professional military band from Albania that has the duty to provide military accompaniment for the Albanian Armed Forces as well as take part in protocol events with the Republican Guard.

== History ==
The first official military band formation of the Albania was created in 1920, with the arrival of the National Band "Vatra" from the United States under the direction of Thoma Nasi. In 1925, on the basis of the band, the Presidential Wind Orchestra was created and then, in September 1928, it became the Royal Band. The band was created in October 1944, in the village of Priskë near Tirana, originally as a 25-member band of the gendarmerie. It took part in the military parade on 28 November of that year in honor of the Liberation of Albania. It was later made to be the band of the Albanian People's Army. In 1990, it was transformed into the band of the Albanian Armed Forces.

== Characteristics ==
It maintains 2 ensembles, a brass orchestra and the Armed Forces Wind Orchestra (AFWO). All 79 musicians have 3 suits that are available for them to wear at any official function in the capital depending on the weather and the seniority of the event. Its signature march is the Marsh Mirësevini (Inspection March).

== Awards and recognition ==
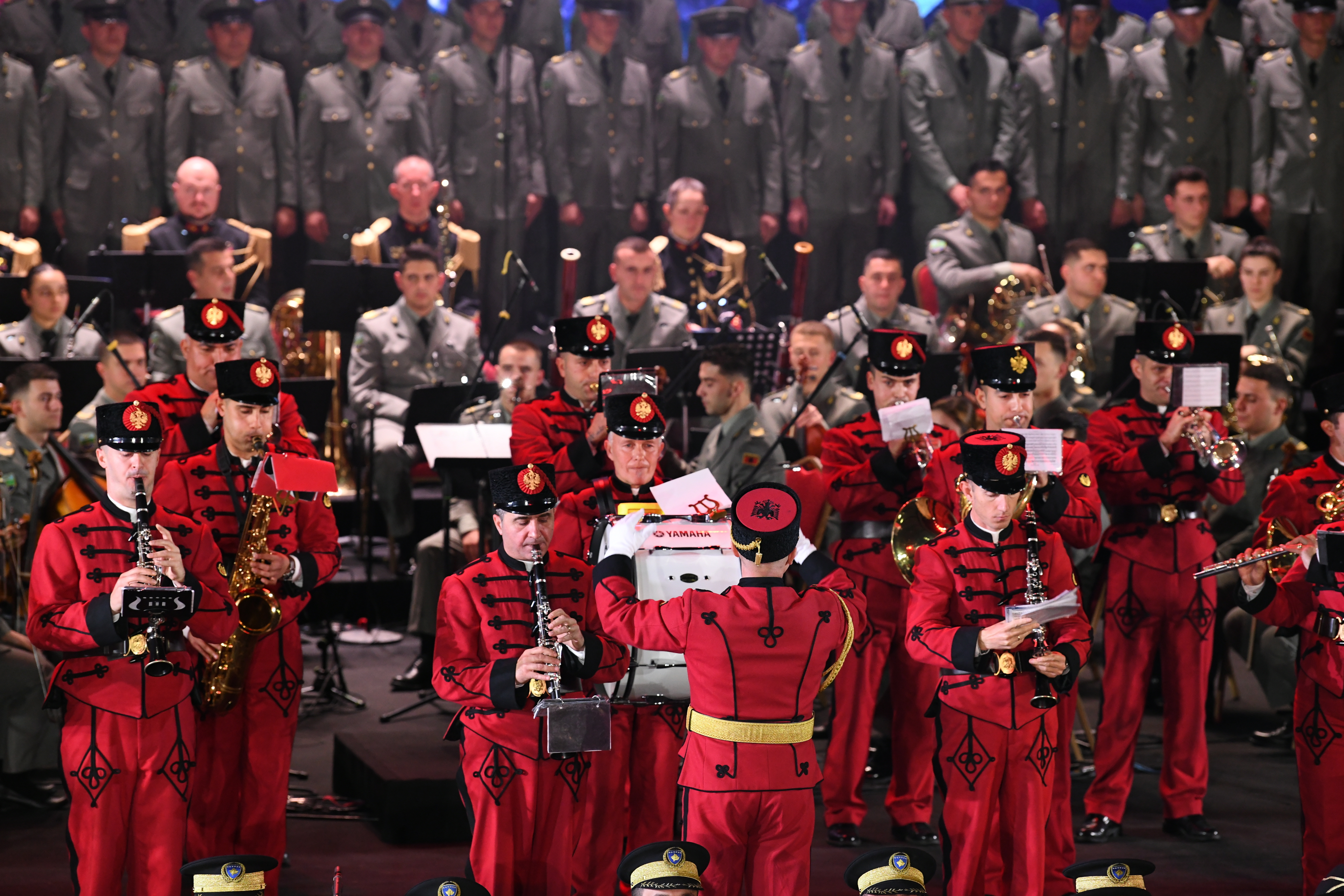
Albanian Armed Forces band perform a music piece in Tirana, Albania, to honor Albania's 110 years of independence

- Before New Year's Eve in 2017, it was honored with the "Medal of Gratitude" by the Municipality of Tirana and the Mayor of Tirana.
- It was awarded the Order of the Flag by President Ilir Meta in the framework of the celebrations of the 100th anniversary of the Vlora War. In his speech, President Meta emphasized that the band "is the only professional wind orchestra in Albania, a worthy descendant of the National Band Vatra", an Albanian-American marching band during the war.
