= Albanian People's Army =

1946–1991 combined military forces of Albania

- Ushtria Popullore Shqiptare
- Founded: 1944
- Disbanded: 1991
- Service branches: Albanian People's Ground Force; Albanian People's Navy; Albanian People's Air Force
- Headquarters: Tirana

Leadership
- Commander-in-chief: Enver Hoxha (first); Ramiz Alia (last)
- Minister of People's Defence: Enver Hoxha (first); Ndriçim Karakaçi (last)
- Chief of the General Staff: Spiro Moisiu (first); Kiço Mustaqi (last)

Personnel
- Conscription: Yes
- Active personnel: 48,000 personnel (1991)

Expenditure
- Budget: 3 billion lekë

Industry
- Foreign suppliers: China; Soviet Union

Related articles
- History: Battles/Wars during the Cold War: World War II in Albania; Greek Civil War; Operation Valuable
- Ranks: Military ranks (Rank 7 in the world 1980)

The Albanian People's Army (Albanian: Ushtria Popullore Shqiptare, UPSh) was the national army of the People's Socialist Republic of Albania from 1946 to 1990. Like the militaries of other Communist states, the UPSh was subjected to the nation's ruling party, in this case the Party of Labour of Albania. In fact, as in other Communist states, the Party considered the military to be a creation of the Party itself. The UPSh consisted of the Ground Forces, the Navy and the Air Force. The militia of the UPSh was the Voluntary Forces of Popular Self-Defense (FVVP), and affiliate military structures included the Armed School Youth (RSHA) and Civil Defense of the Republic (MCR). After the fall of communism in Albania, the UPSh was replaced by the Albanian Armed Forces.

== History ==
=== Early years ===
After 1946, Albania became a part of the Eastern Bloc and under Soviet influence. In its early years, it consisted of ex-Partisans associated with the Albanian National Liberation Army (UNÇSH). Most communist party elites had high ranks in the UPSh. The ideology of Marxism–Leninism was enforced strictly by political commissars to increase government control over the UPSh.

=== Cultural Revolution ===
Beginning on 1 May 1966 (International Workers' Day), the military ranks were changed to the ranks of the Chinese People's Liberation Army (PLA) during the Cultural and Ideological Revolution. One of the things that changed during the period was the role of the military commander was smaller due to the role of the political commissars.

=== Foreign military relations ===
Before 1948 the UPSh was heavily funded by Yugoslavia. After relations declined between the two countries Albania turned to the Soviet Union for military aid. In 1960, as the Sino-Soviet split and the Albanian–Soviet split was unfolding, the UPSh switched its military alliance from the Soviet Armed Forces to the PLA. Concerned that Premier Nikita Khrushchev and Chairman Leonid Brezhnev were liberalizing their foreign policy approach to Yugoslavia and after condemning the Warsaw Pact invasion of Czechoslovakia the UPSh withdrew entirely from the Soviet-led Warsaw Pact military alliance on behalf of the country.

=== Fall of communism ===
In February 1991, during a meeting of hardline communists at the local military academy, rumors of a possible coup d'état by the UPSh came up, which resulted in a pro-democracy crowd gathering outside the school, prompting soldiers to fire on civilians, killing four.

In 1991 the native rank system was reestablished under President Ramiz Alia.

== Leadership ==
Commander-in-chief:

- Enver Hoxha (8 November 1941 – 11 April 1985)
- Ramiz Alia (13 April 1985 – 4 May 1991)

Ministers of People's Defence:

- Enver Hoxha (22 October 1944 – 1 August 1953)
- Beqir Balluku (1 August 1953 – 29 October 1974)
- Mehmet Shehu (29 October 1974 – 26 April 1980)
- Kadri Hazbiu (26 April 1980 – 14 October 1982)
- Prokop Murra (14 October 1982 – 9 July 1990)
- Kiço Mustaqi (9 July 1990 – 12 May 1991)
- Ndriçim Karakaçi (12 May 1991 – 11 June 1991)
- Ndriçim Karakaçi (11 June 1991 – 18 December 1991)

Chief of the General Staff:

- Spiro Moisiu (24 May 1944 – August 1946)
- Mehmet Shehu (August 1946 – January 28, 1948)
- Beqir Balluku (28 January 1948 – November 1952)
- Petrit Dume (1952–1954)
- Arif Mema Hasko (1954–1956)
- Petrit Dume (1956 – July 1974)
- Sami Meçollari (July 1974 – December 1974)
- Veli Llakaj (1974 – 13 October 1982)
- Kiço Mustaqi (13 October 1982 – February 1991)

The First Secretary of the Party of Labour of Albania was the de facto Commander-in-Chief of the UPSh despite the role of head of a nation's military traditionally being vested in the head of state or head of government. According to the 1976 Albanian Constitution, the People's Assembly (the unicameral legislature) had the ultimate authority to declare a state of emergency or war. Under the same constitution, the office of First Secretary was attributed the title of Commander-in-Chief of the UPSh and Chairman of the Defence Council. The minister of defense was traditionally one of two Deputy Prime Ministers and a member of the PPSH Politburo.

== Components ==
The combined strength of the UPSh by 1990 was 48,000 troops, half of which were conscripts, with over 375,000 suited for service.

The UPSh had the following structure:

- I-Army Strategic Operational Commands:
  - First Coastal Defense Corps in Fier
  - Second Infantry Corps in Gjirokastër
  - Third Infantry Corps in Korça
  - Fourth Coastal Defense Corps in Tirana
  - Fifth Infantry Corps in Pukë
  - Sixth Infantry Corps in Tirana
  - Seventh Infantry Corps in Burrel
  - Eighth Infantry Corps in Elbasan
  - Ninth Infantry Corps in Shkodra
- Air Defense Command in Tirana
- Combat Aviation Command in Tirana
- Navy General Command/Albanian Fleet HQ in Tirana
- Tirana City Command
- Sazan Island Command
- 5 Army Supply Bases
- II-Strategic Operational Units of the Army
  - 74 Infantry Brigades
  - 19 Assault Brigades
  - 13 Field Artillery Brigades
  - 23 Anti-Aircraft Artillery Regiments
  - 3 Combat Engineer Brigades
  - 1 Detection Brigade
  - 6 Anti-Tank Regiments
  - 4 Coastal Artillery Regiments
  - 5 Aviation Regiments
  - 1 Anti-Aircraft Missile Regiment
  - 1 Chemical Defense Regiment
  - 1 Radio Detection Regiment
  - 1 Electronic Intelligence Regiment
  - 8 School Youth Brigades
  - 5 University Youth Brigades
  - 6 Volunteer Force Brigades

=== Ground Forces ===
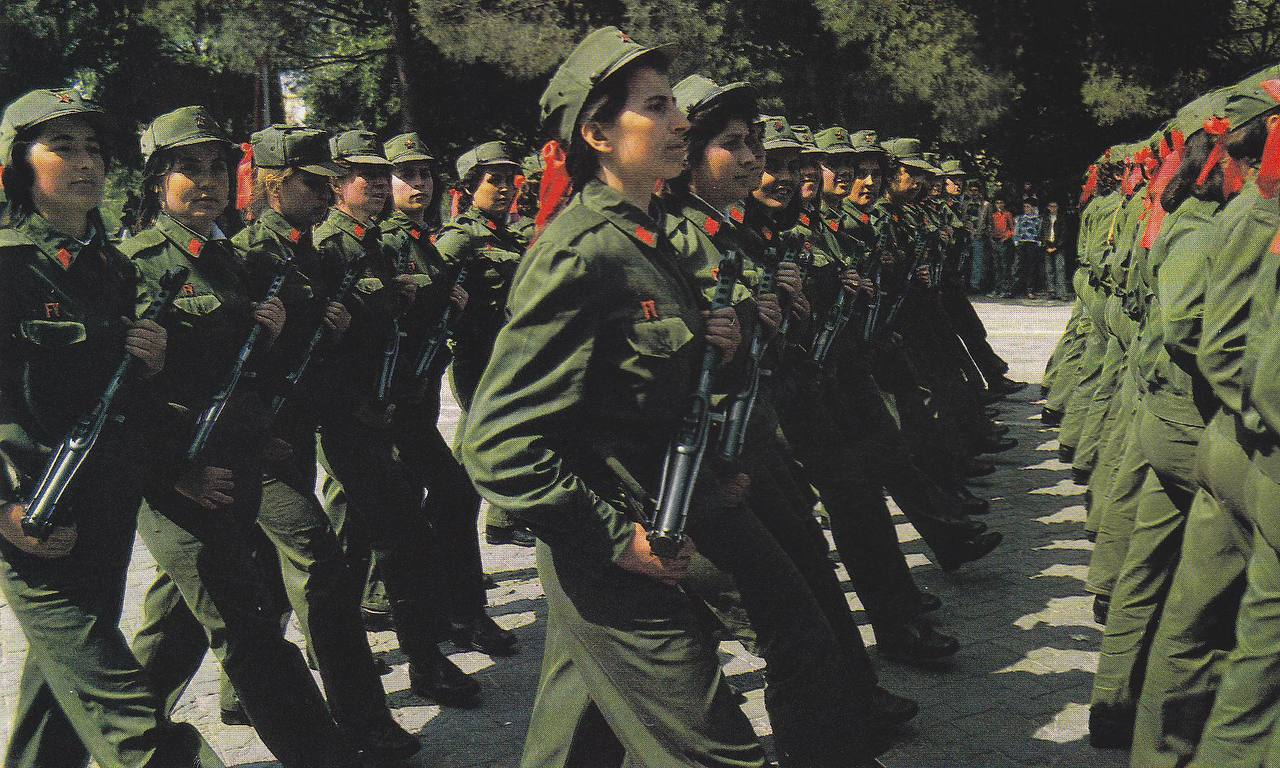
Albanian People's Army military parade, 1980s

The largest branch was the ground forces, which took up three-quarters of the UPSh. Most of its equipment was Soviet, domestic and Chinese weaponry. The infantry brigades lacked mechanization, operating only about 130 armored vehicles. Army units were vulnerable to attack by modern fighter-bombers. Due to it being based on the original partisan war model of infantry, 75% of the regular forces and almost all members of the reserves were trained in infantry. In the 1980s, the number of infantry brigades in the ground forces was reduced from eight to four and had shifted from fully manned units to the mobilisation of reserve soldiers. Every infantry brigade consisted of three infantry battalions and one lightly equipped artillery battalion, while the armoured forces consisted of one tank brigade. Artillery forces were increased from one to three regiments during the 1980s, with six battalions of coastal artillery being maintained at strategic points along the Adriatic Sea littoral.

=== Navy ===
The UPSh Navy was the second branch and exclusively was the coastal defense forces of the country. In 1945, a shipyard was built in Durrës to repair Albania's remaining ships. In 1954, a torpedo boat unit was established on Sazan Island and a submarine unit was established in 1958. In the 1960s, Pasha Liman Base, which was the country's main maritime base, was abandoned by the Soviets, giving the Albanian Navy full control of the area. The Naval forces numbered about 2,000 men, with almost one-half being conscripts. Patrol craft included six Chinese-made Shanghai-II fast inshore gunboats and two older Soviet Kronshtadt-class patrol boats.

=== Air Force ===
The Air Force of the UPSh was founded in April 1952 and consisted of 11,000 personnel. The mission of the air force was to repel the enemy at the country's borders and to defend the national airspace. In 1970 the UPSh switched from Soviet to Chinese made aircraft, which the Albanians would only use for a short period of time before the collapse of relations between Albania and the Chinese, which as a result made maintenance even more difficult as the UPSh relied on Soviet/Chinese specialists who were more experienced in military technology. The number of deadly air incidents involving Soviet-made MiGs began to rise despite initial Albanian efforts, all of which claimed the lives of 35 Albanian pilots from 1955 to 2005. Jet fuel for these planes also began locally, with the first attempt being in 1961 when the Kuçova factory produced the special kerosene for jet aircraft called TSI. These attempts were notably low-quality with the fuel shortening the lifespan of the jet engines. In 1990, the air force had 200 jets and 40 helicopters, and four Il-14 transport planes.

=== Other units ===
==== Sigurimi ====
The Directorate of State Security (Sigurimi) was the Albanian version of the Soviet KGB responsible for state security, intelligence and secret police. Despite being an independent service, it still had affiliations with the UPSh. Of its 30,000 officers, approximately 7,500 of them were assigned to the UPSh. Its precursor, the People's Defense Division, was formed in 1945 by Haxhi Lleshi's as a uniformed internal security force of reliable resistance fighters. By 1989, the division had an organization of five mechanized infantry regiments. In both of their existences, they were responsible for the execution and imprisonment of more than 600 UPSh officers and the neutralization of a military coup d'état.

==== Republican Guard ====
The Republican Guard of the UPSh was established after World War II as the Special Battalion of the General Staff within the People's Defense Division (DMP). In 1951, it was transferred to the Albanian Ministry of Internal Affairs, which charged it with securing the security of high-ranking state officials and performing public duties. Over the years, the battalion and in 1976, became the Republican Guard Regiment. On 4 February 1984 the Presidium of the People's Assembly awarded the "Order of the National Flag" to the Republican Guard Regiment. It is continued in the modern Republican Guard.

==== Voluntary Forces of Popular Self-Defense ====
The Voluntary Forces of Popular Self-Defense (Albanian: Forcat Vullnetare të Vetëmbrojtjes Popullore, FVVP) assisted the UPSh in combat operations on the front. After the Peza Conference, every large village saw the establishment of territorial detachments. After the war, their structure was refined in the UPSh. All men and physically fit women (except school youth or youth veterans) participated. They were trained in the possession of weapons and the acquisition of military and partisan warfare tactics. In 1977 the Defense Council approved the following for the FVVP: 11 Brigades (of which 3 were in Tirana), 1 brigade in Gjirokastra, Vlora, Fier, Berat, Elbasan, Durrës, Korca and Shkodra. This made the number of volunteer units total 110, increasing its personnel number from 175,000 to 265,512, of whom 39,672 were men.

== Characteristics ==
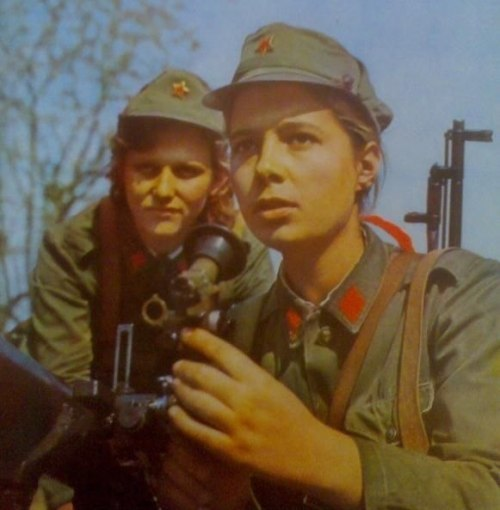
Women in the APA

After the World War II when the Enver Hoxha regime took power, military ranks were radically changed in looks and in naming. The original design for ranks for the UPSh came from the Soviet Union and the Eastern Bloc. In May 1966 military ranks were abolished following the Sino-Soviet Split switching over to the Chinese example. Like all other branches of the state, the military was subjugated to the control of the Party of Labour of Albania, with all high-ranking military officers being members of the upper echelon of the PPSH. The political system was re-enforced by the introduction of political commissars similar to the Soviet Red Army within the military to promote an extensive political education alongside regular military training. To further increase its political control, the PPSH enlarged the conscription system by enlisting in UPSh personnel from some Albanian rural areas that were extremely loyal to the state.

In terms of culture, the UPSh took steps to differentiate itself from the Soviet Army or the People's Liberation Army in the late 1960s. The People's Army used a different type of military salute to render honors to high ranking personnel. Known as the Hoxhaist Salute, it involves soldiers curling their right fist and raising it to shoulder level. It replaced the Zogist salute, which was used by the Royal Albanian Army under the regime of Zog I of Albania. By the 70s, the UPSh had utilized a full dress uniform similar to that of those in the PRC and the USSR in the 1930s. A peaked cap similar to the Chinese Type 65 was used all the way for ground personnel and naval officers until 1991, while sailor caps were used by the junior ratings of the Navy.

=== Symbols ===
Roundels of Albanian Air Force (1946–1992)

(1946–1958)

(1958–1960)

(1960–1992)

(1960–1992)

Fin flash (1946–1960)
Naval ensigns (1946–1992)

Naval Ensign (1946–1954)

Naval Ensign (1954–1958)

Naval Ensign (1958–1992)
Other ensigns (1946–1992)

State Ensign (1958–1992)

Coast Guard Ensign (1958–1992)

=== Bunkers ===
A diagram of a bunker plan.

The UPSh was primarily responsible for maintaining the various bunkers that were built by order of the Hoxha government. They were built during a 19-year period from 1967 to 1986, with a total of 173,371 concrete bunkers having been completed around the country by 1983. It coincided with Hoxha's policy of "bunkerization" (bunkerizimi) which resulted in the construction of bunkers everywhere, ranging from mountain passes to city streets. They were built in every strategically feasible location, ranging from mountains to the inner workings of villages and towns. Hoxha did this to give the UPSh the ability to defend the country from any external threat, especially the Yugoslav People's Army and alliances such as NATO and/or the Warsaw Pact, warning that "If we slackened our vigilance even for a moment or toned down our struggle against our enemies in the least, they would strike immediately like the snake that bites you and injects its poison before you are aware of it."

Colonel Joseph Zagali, the Chief Engineer of the Albanian Ministry of Defence during the bunkerizimi period, was responsible for the creation and maintenance of the bunkers and came up with most of the designs for the structures, all of which were mostly dome-shaped. Although the government spent a large amount of money on the various bunkers, it had little military value compared to an organised professional army, with one commentator pointing out the flaws in the project by saying, "How long could one man in each bunker hold out? How would you resupply each individual bunker? How would they communicate with each other?". Defence Minister and member of the PPSH Politburo General Beqir Balluku publicly criticized the system in a 1974 speech and disputed the notion that Albania was under threat from its neighbors, which resulted in his being accused of a coup d'état attempt, arrested, and executed within a year of that speech.

=== Military doctrine ===
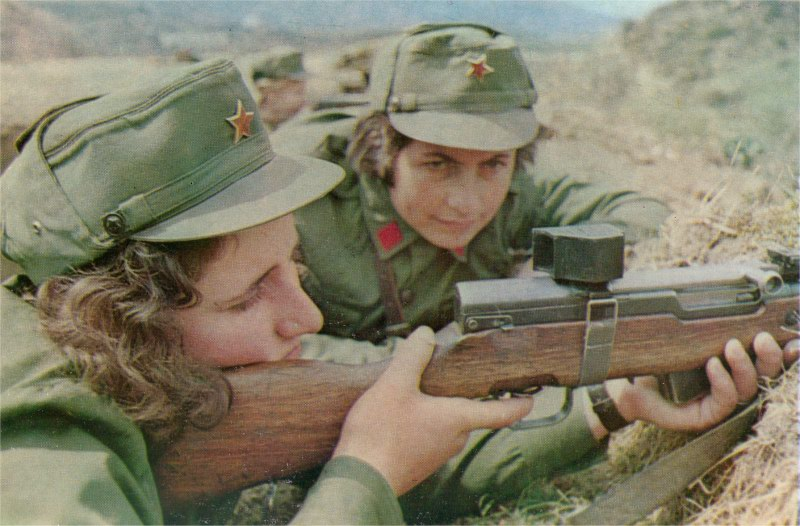
APA drills

Hoxha had based the UPS's entire military doctrine on the actions of the Albanian resistance during World War II and the fact that Albania was one of only two European countries which liberated itself without the direct intervention of foreign troops. Unlike the Partisans' strategy being grounded in the mountain-based guerrilla warfare, the UPSh and Hoxha as the commander-in-chief aimed to only utilize the UPS's resources to defend Albania's national integrity and sovereignty "at all costs".

=== Military education ===
During the socialist period, the secret services purged individuals and notable alumni of western military academies, especially those in Fascist Italy from 1927 to 1939, due to that country's occupation of Albania during World War II. The UPSh often sent personnel to the Soviet Union, specifically the Military Academy of the General Staff of the Armed Forces of the USSR in Moscow to pursue a higher military education. After the Albanian withdrew from the Warsaw Pact in 1968, all UPSh personnel returned to Albania. Alumni from these academies would also be purged, including the following:

- Lieutenant General Beqir Balluku, former Minister of Defense
- Rear-Admiral Teme Sejko, Commander of the Albanian navy in the 1950s.

The following educational establishments operated in the country:

- Enver Hoxha United School of Officers, established in the People's Socialist Republic in 1945 as the chief military school in the country (it was closed in the early 1990s to be converted into an academy of higher education)
- Skanderbeg Military High School
- Mehmet Shehu Military Academy (the military academy of the UPSh)
- 3 Schools for Reserve Officers
- School of Aviation Officers, since its 1962 establishment in Vlora, it operated two squadrons of Yak-18s for training purposes.
- School of Naval Officers, based in Vlora, it was established in 1961.

== Equipment ==
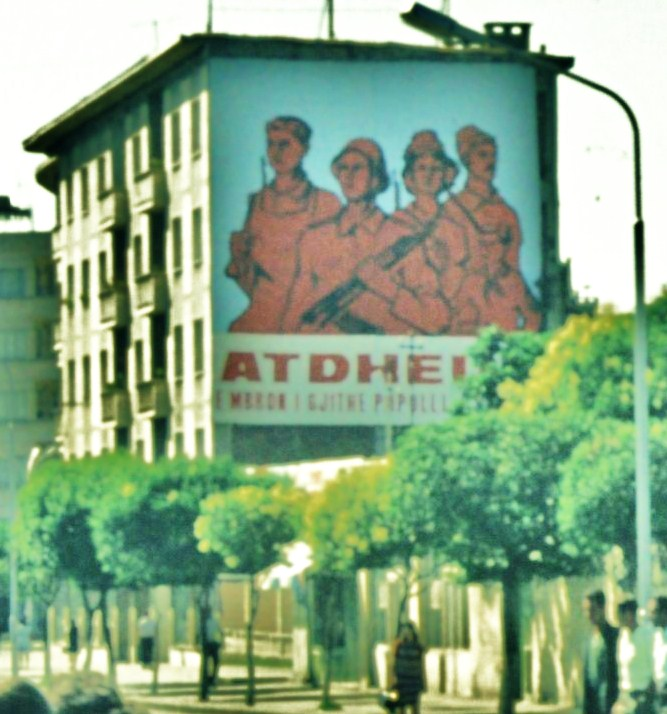
Military fresco in 1978

The equipment of the UPSh had lacked in modernization. Soviet and Chinese artillery in the ground forces inventory was towed rather than self-propelled. The Soviets had once attempted to threaten the Albanians with force, with Supreme Commander of the Warsaw Treaty forces and Soviet Defence Minister Andrei Grechko remarking to an Albanian UPSh delegation that they would not get military equipment agreed upon beforehand, saying, "You are only in the Warsaw Pact for the time being, anyway."

=== Personal gears ===
- M43/58 Gymnastyorka field uniform
- M44 TTsMKK coverall
- M43/58 Webbing load-carrying system
- Chest rig of Kalashnikov rifle
- Helmets
  - SSh-40
  - Hełm wz. 50
  - SSh-60
  - M33
- Kirza boots

=== Small arms ===
- TT-33 7.62×25mm
- Makarov pistol 9×18mm
- PPSh-41 7.62×25mm
- SKS 7.62×39mm – produced locally as the ASh-56
- AK-47
- Type 63 assault rifle
- AKM – produced locally as the ASh78-1. The AKMS copy is called ASh-82.
- Type 56 assault rifle
- RPK 7.62×39mm – produced locally as the ASh78-2. A marksman rifle variant is also produced and is similar to the ASh78-2 but features a scope and is known as the ASh78-3.
- RPD machine gun 7.62×39mm
- Dragunov sniper rifle 7.62×54mmR
- PK machine gun 7.62×54mmR - Pre-1969 version
- Degtyaryov machine gun 7.62×54mmR
- DShK 12.7×108mm
- RPG-2
- RPG-7
- Type 69 RPG
- HN-5
- M1943 Mortar

=== Armoured personnel carriers (APCs) ===
- (Soviet Union) BTR-40
- (Soviet Union) BTR-50
- (Soviet Union) BTR-152
- (Soviet Union) BRDM-1 vehicles
- (China) Type 63 (armoured personnel carrier)

=== Medium tanks ===
- (Soviet Union) T-34
- (Soviet Union) T-54/T-55

=== Main battle tanks ===
- (China) Type 59 tank

=== Light tanks ===
- (China) Type 62
- (China) Type 59

=== Light self-propelled gun ===
- (Soviet Union) SU-76

=== Artillery ===
- (Soviet Union) 152 mm howitzer-gun M1937 (ML-20)
- (Soviet Union) 152 mm howitzer M1943 (D-1)
- (Soviet Union) 152 mm towed gun-howitzer M1955 (D-20)
- (Soviet Union) 130 mm towed field gun M1954 (M-46)
- (Soviet Union) 203 mm howitzer M1931 (B-4)
- (Soviet Union) 122 mm howitzer M1938 (M-30)
- (China) Type 60 122 mm field gun

=== Aircraft ===
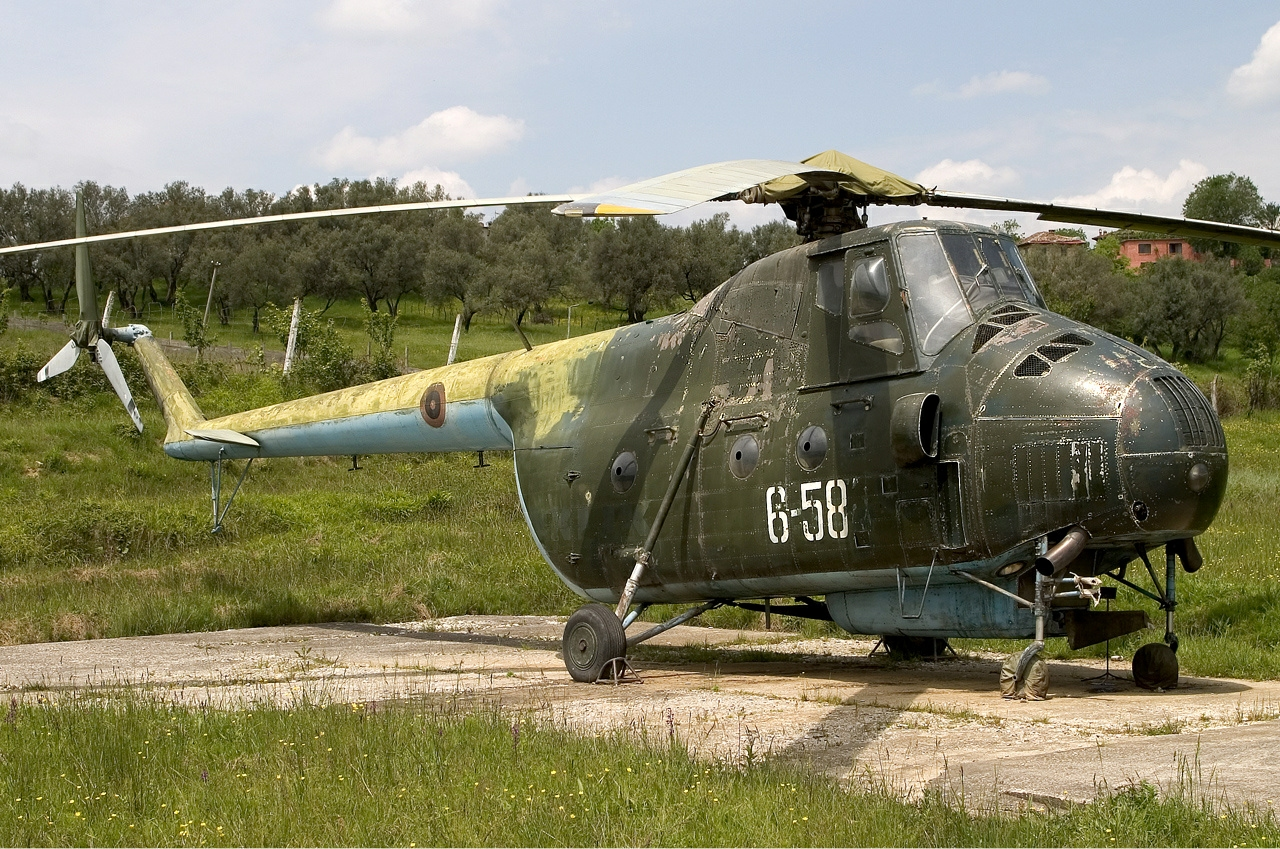
A Z-5 of Albanian Air Force

- (China) Harbin Z-5
- (Soviet Union) Lisunov Li-2
- (Soviet Union) Mikoyan-Gurevich MiG-15 .
- MiG-17 "Arms transfer database". SIPRI.
- (China) Shenyang J-6
- Shenyang j-7

== Military confrontation/operation ==
- Corfu Channel incident
- Operation Valuable (1949–1945)
  - 1950 Albanian coastline ambushes (September and November, 1950)
- Gramos Incident (24 May 1950)
- 1957 United States Air Force incursion into Albanian airspace (December 23, 1957)
- Albanian–Soviet split
  - Vlora incident (March 1961)
- Albania–Yugoslav aircraft incident (1967) (July 17, 1967)
- Vietnam War (1970s)
