= M59 =

M59 may refer to:

- Messier 59, an elliptical galaxy in the constellation Virgo
- M59 armored personnel carrier, a United States military vehicle
- M59 rifle, a Yugoslav copy of the SKS
- M-59 (Michigan highway), a Michigan state highway near Detroit
- M59 (Cape Town), a Metropolitan Route in Cape Town, South Africa
- M59 (Johannesburg), a Metropolitan Route in Johannesburg, South Africa
- M59 (Durban), a Metropolitan Route in Durban, South Africa
- Meridian 59, an online game
- M59/85, a Yugoslav modification of Stahlhelm that eventually replaced the latter
- 155 mm gun M59, United States military field gun
