= Albanian Air Force Academy =

Albanian military academy in Vlorë, Albania

The Air Force Academy (Albanian: Shkolla e Aviacionit) was an educational institution of the Albanian Air Force based in Vlorë, Albania. Four year courses were held at the academy, after which graduates were transferred as officers to the air force.

== History ==
In the late 1930s, the first pilots were sent to train in Austria, Italy and France. After the Second World War, airmen were sent to Yugoslavia and the Soviet Union for training after the need for a domestic training program became apparent. People's Defense Minister, Beqir Balluku ordered the establishment of the "Aviation School" in the city of Vlorë. It was created by decree of the Presidium of the People's Assembly on 11 May, 1962 as the Air Force School of the Albanian People's Army. In 1963, the first jet training squadron was formed, with pilots training on Soviet MIG-15 jet aircraft. JAK-61s and MIG-19s were also used, with the former used for basic pilot training and the latter for advanced pilot training. From 1967-1968, during which the country underwent a Cultural and Ideological Revolution, the school was restructured to train maintenance personnel and flight instructors. In 1971, it was renamed as the "High School of Aviation" by the Defense Council.

In 1992, after the fall of the People's Socialist Republic, it was renamed as the Air Force Academy and consequently in 2005, it was renamed as the Air Force Corps School. In 2008, the Air Force Corps School passed under the auspices of the Defense Ministry.

The former academy training field was converted into a soccer field in the 2010s.

== Alumni ==
- Colonel Vladimir Avdia, acting military representative of Albania in NATO.

== See also ==
- Naval Academy (Albania)
- Italian Air Force Academy
- Hellenic Air Force Academy
