= Skanderbeg Military High School =

Military school in Albania

The Skanderbeg Military High School (Albanian: Shkollës së Mesme Ushtarake “Skënderbej), nicknamed as the Army Nursery was a military boarding school of the Albanian People's Army of the People's Socialist Republic of Albania. It served to prepare youth with general military education and the necessary secondary education to attend civilian and military higher military institutions. In doing so, it served as a feeder school for the Enver Hoxha United School of Officers. By 1960 about sixty-percent of the graduates of the United School of Officers came from the Military High School.

== History ==
On 28 March 1945, the "School of War Pioneers" was opened in Tirana, following the Liberation of Albania the previous November. The first students to enroll in the school were 200 youth partisans, among them seven girls. On 11 February 1947, by order of the Minister of Defence Enver Hoxha (serving as the de facto leader and Supreme Commander), the school was renamed Skanderbeg Military High School, after Skanderbeg. The school began operating in the Lapraka Military Garrison, then moved to the Liaison Regiment before finally moved to the military school complex. Over the years, it reached quotas of up to 2000 students. 33,000 children went through its ranks. In 1992, the high school was closed. In an interview given by President Sali Berisha, he declared that the reason he ordered the closure of the school was because "It is inhumane to educate children in adolescence with such a Spartan discipline."

== School life ==
=== Traditions ===
Students at the school were known as "Skanderbegians" and generally were children of party leaders and military leaders.

=== Academics ===
By 1953, Skanderbegians received seven years of education, combining middle school and high school education with military training. The school had a 4-year program intertwined with winter and summer camps 15–30 days each year. The school gave certificates in various professions such as mechanics, construction, economics, and music. The Russian and English languages were also taught. Most teachers studied in Italy, Austria, the Soviet Union and Germany, as well as domestic institutions such as the University of Tirana. It was led by a military commander and civilian director.

=== Activities ===
Skanderbegians have been distinguished in their participation in concerts, military parades, olympiads and demonstrations. It took part in the national response to the 1967 earthquake in Dibër County or the 1979 Montenegro earthquake.

== Legacy ==
The National Association “Skënderbegasi” (Albanian: Shoqatën Kombëtare “Skënderbegasi”) operates as an alumni association for the school. On the occasion of the 76th anniversary of the establishment of the school in 2021, President Ilir Meta awarded the association with the "Honor of the Nation" Decoration for “preserving and developing the traditions of the Military High School 'Skënderbej'".

== Notable alumni ==
- Sami Meçollari, Chief of the General Staff from July 1974 – December 1974.
- Kiço Mustaqi, Minister of People's Defence from 1990 to 1991.
- Halim Abazi, first post-communist Chief of the General Staff.

== See also ==
- Pioneers of Enver
- Suvorov Military School
