= Liberation Day (Albania) =

Holiday on 29 November

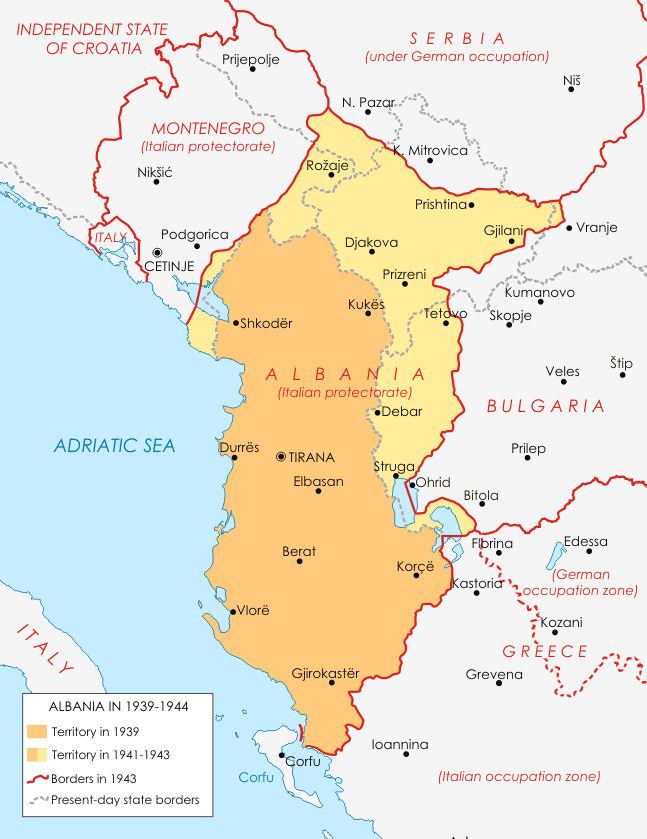
Map of Albania during World War II

Liberation Day (Albanian: Dita e Çlirimit) in Albania is commemorated as the day, November 29, 1944, in which the country was liberated from Nazi Germany forces by the Albanian resistance during World War II.

== Background ==
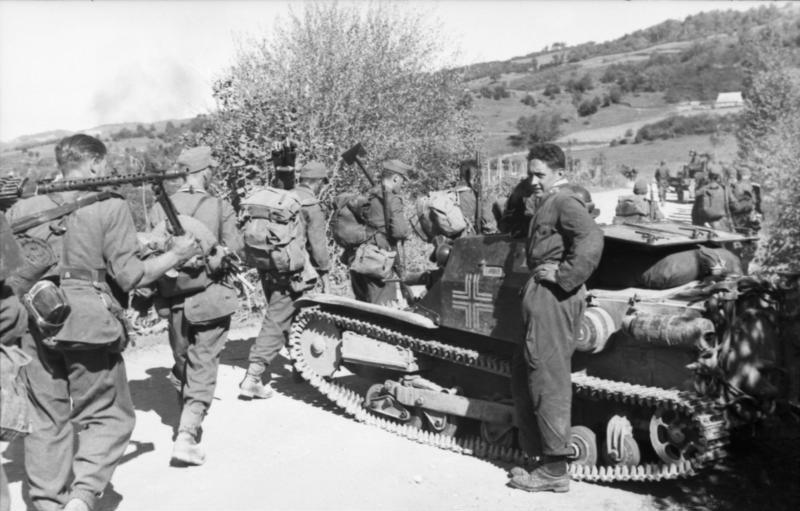
German soldiers in Albania

After Italy was defeated by the Allies, Germany occupied Albania in September 1943, dropping paratroopers into Tirana before the Albanian guerrillas could take the capital, and the German army soon drove the guerrillas into the hills and to the south. Berlin subsequently announced it would recognize the independence of a neutral Albania and organized an Albanian government, police, and military. Many Balli Kombëtar units collaborated with the Germans against the communists, and several Balli Kombëtar leaders held positions in the German-sponsored regime.

The partisans entirely liberated Albania from German occupation on November 29, 1944. The National Liberation Army, which in October 1944 consisted of 70,000 regulars, also took part in the war alongside the antifascist coalition. By that time, the Red Army was also entering neighboring Yugoslavia, and the German Army was evacuating from Greece into Yugoslavia.

== Commemoration ==
=== Communist era origins ===
The holiday was first proclaimed in the early 1950s as a day of commemoration. During the era of the People's Socialist Republic of Albania, Liberation Day was the main state holiday, celebrated with a military parade of the Albanian People's Army on Tirana's Dëshmorët e Kombit Boulevard. The parade usually consisted of active servicemen and veterans of the UPS, schoolchildren from the local Tirana school district, the men and women of the Voluntary Forces of Popular Self-Defense, the Republican Guard Regiment and UPSh personnel from the Directorate of State Security (Sigurimi), marching with musical accompaniment from the Band of the Albanian People's Army. It was held on jubilee years, including on the ruby jubilee in 1984 and the silver jubilee in 1969.

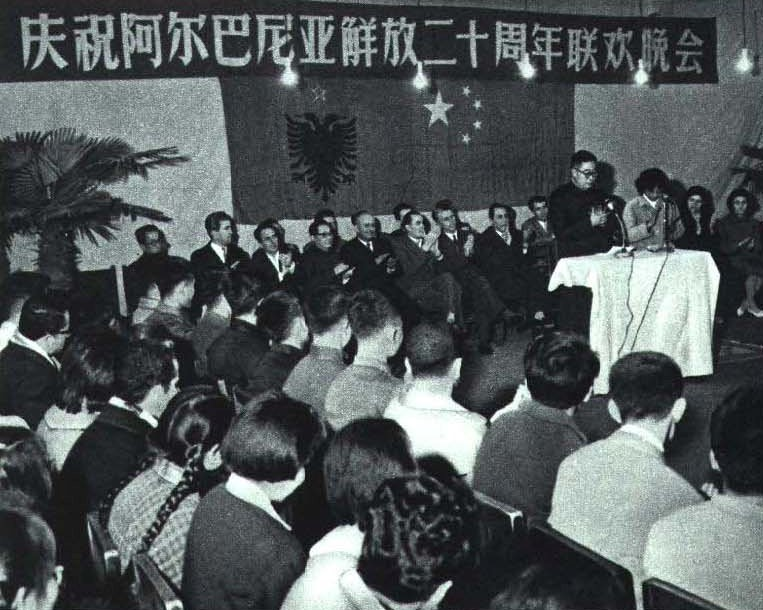
A 1964 celebration at Peking University in honor of the 20th anniversary of the liberation of Albania.

A commemorative coin called "50 Qindarka" was issued by the Bank of Albania in honor of the 25th anniversary of the Liberation of Albania. Qemal Stafa Stadium was renovated in time for the 30th anniversary in 1974.

In the 50s and 60s, Albanians at foreign universities such as Peking University and Kim Il-sung University have held cross cultural events on the holiday.

=== Modern times ===
Liberation Day comes a day after the Albanian Flag Day or Independence Day commemorating the Albanian Declaration of Independence and the rise of the Albanian flag in Vlora on November 28, 1912. As a result, the celebrations are connected. The entire two day period is a non-working day. Today, the holiday is celebrated with a national ceremony of some sort including the Albanian Armed Forces. A wreath laying ceremony takes place in the National Martyrs' Cemetery of Albania, where 900 war dead are buried. These events are held in the presence of the President of Albania, the Prime Minister, the Chairman of the Parliament, the Minister of Defense, the Chief of the Albanian General Staff and MPs of the Kuvendi. In 2014, a military parade took place at the Ministry of Defense during the platinum jubilee of the Liberation of Albania, which included an exhibition drill and a mass inspection.

== Controversy ==
During the celebrations, war veterans often march in processions or sit at ceremonies while either carrying portraits of former Communist dictator Enver Hoxha or performing the Hoxhaist Salute. At the 70th anniversary of the liberation of Tirana in 2014, Prime Minister Edi Rama ordered that veterans carrying Hoxha's portrait be asked to leave, and the US Ambassador later stated that the display had "stained" the ceremony and "offended the people of Albania".

== Sources ==
- Colonel David Smiley. Albanian Assignment, Foreword by Patrick Leigh Fermor, Chatto & Windus, London, 1984. The SOE in Albania by a brother-in-arms of Julian Amery and Neil "Billy" McLean. With numerous photographs.
- Colonel David Smiley. Irregular Regular, Michael Russell, Norwich, 1994 (ISBN 0 85955 202 0). Translated in French in 2008. Au coeur de l’action clandestine. Des Commandos au MI6, L’Esprit du Livre Editions, (ISBN 978-2-915960-27-3).The Memoirs of a SOE officer in Albania and Thaïland (Force 136), then a MI6 agent (Poland, Albania, Oman, Yemen).
- Library of Congress Country Study of Albania
- Brigadier Edmund Frank "Trotsky" Davies. Illyrian venture: The story of the British military mission to enemy-occupied Albania, 1943–44, Bodley Head, 1952.
- Biçoku, Kasem (2001). 28 nëntor 1944 dita e çlirimit të Shqipërisë. Rilindja Demokratike.
