= 2011 Albanian opposition demonstrations =

Anti-government protests over corruption

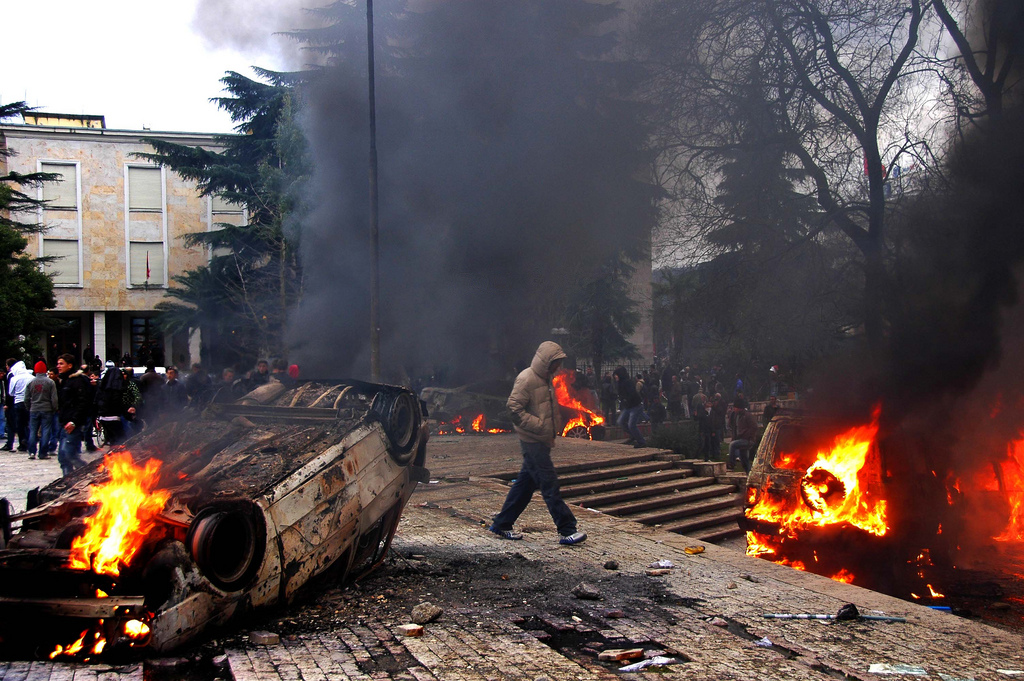
- Devastation in Albanian capital, 21 January 2011
- Date: 21 January 2011 — 4 February 2011
- Location: Albania
- Caused by: Alleged corruption video involving Ilir Meta
- Methods: Demonstrations, strike action, riots.
- Result: Protests suppressed by security forces; Government remains in power; no early elections called; Subsequent criminal investigations and trials regarding the deaths of four protesters

Lead figures
Edi Rama	Sali Berisha, Prime Minister; Lulzim Basha, Minister of Internal Affairs; Albanian Republican Guard

Number
More than 20,000 (on 21 January); 100,000 (on 28 January)	Unknown number of police officers

Casualties and losses
4 fatalities 150+ injuries	

Anti-government protests took place in 2011 in cities across Albania following 18 months of political conflict over alleged electoral fraud by the opposition. A video surfaced which portrayed the deputy prime minister arranging a corrupt deal with the minister of economy. The public outcry over the video resulted in the resignation of the deputy prime minister, Ilir Meta. A demonstration was called by parliamentary opposition parties, which include the Socialist Party and the Unity for Human Rights Party. These were called on 21 January in order to protest the alleged corruption of the Albanian government as well as widespread unemployment and poverty in the country.

On 21 January, a protest in Tirana led to the killings of three demonstrators by the Republican Guard during a rally in front of Prime Minister Sali Berisha office. A fourth person died several days later in a hospital in Ankara, Turkey.

== Background ==
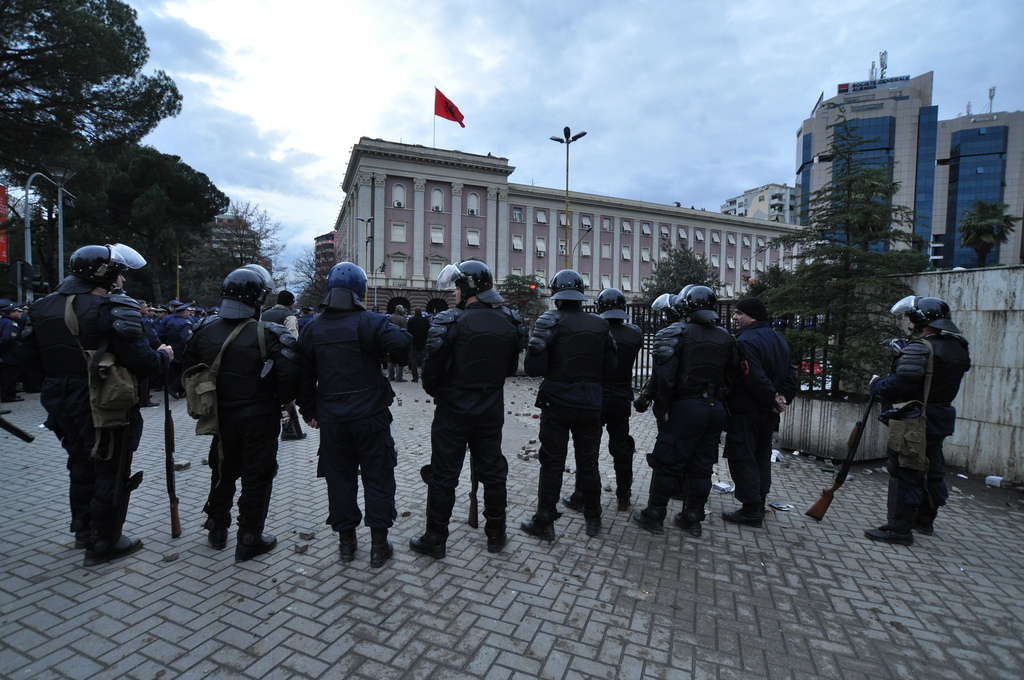
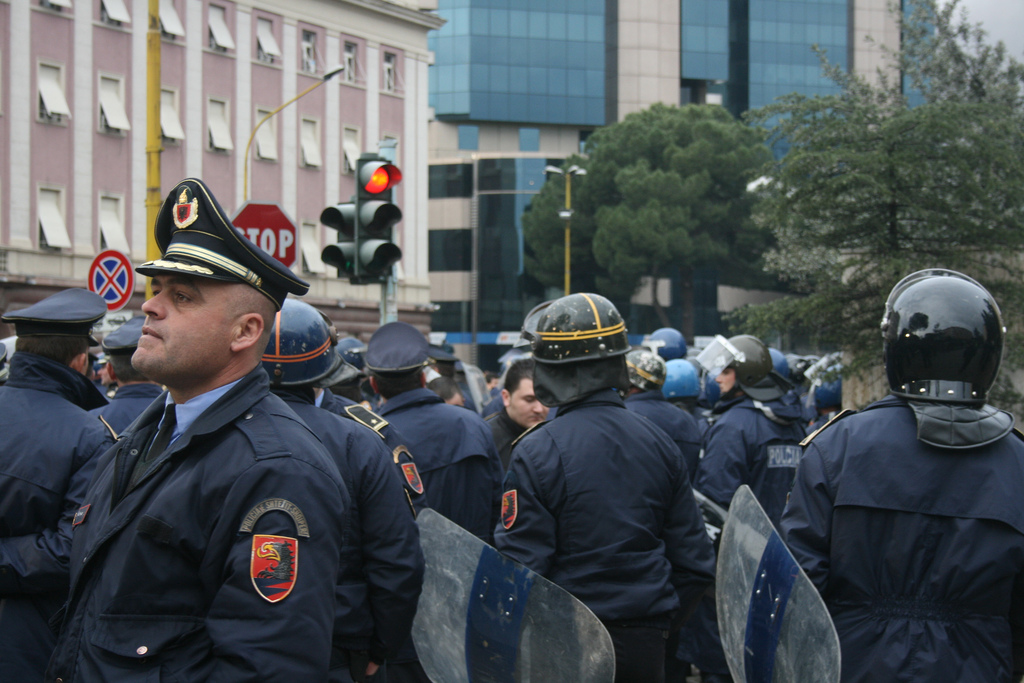
Albanian police during the 21 January 2011 demonstration in Tirana

Edi Rama has been a part of Albanian politics since 1998 and Paskal Milo has been in Albanian politics since 1991. Sali Berisha has been in Albanian politics since 1990. Skënder Gjinushi has been in Albanian politics for 24 years.

=== Allegations of electoral fraud ===
The Socialist Party, the largest opposition party at the time, alleged that the June 2009 parliamentary election was neither free nor fair. When the leader of the Democratic Party Sali Berisha could not form a government with his own coalition partners, he established another coalition with the LSI. This deal further galvanized the opposition and the Socialist Party led 18 months of continuous protests against the government. Berisha also continuously postponed the opening of the ballot boxes for a recount. Ultimately the ballots were burned by the Albanian electoral commission.

The governing coalition wanted a Parliamentary Investigative Committee to examine the election but the Socialist Party objected to the move. They then organized a 21-day hunger strike in the main boulevard in Tirana. However, the hunger strike was embroiled in controversy as images emerged of the strikers eating. At the beginning of January, the ballot boxes from the June 2009 election were burned, while other electoral materials were sealed for 25 years, making an investigation legally impossible.

=== Opposition claims ===
On 11 January Ilir Meta, chairman of LSI, was shown putting pressure on one of the government ministers and finalizing a number of economic deals informally. Meta forced the Minister to cancel a deal between a contractor and the Ministry and to make a new deal with new terms with another individual connected with Meta's economic interests. Furthermore, he forced the Minister to hire two individuals into mid-level government jobs and finally asked for another favor in a deal involving a hydro-electrical power plant. Meta mentioned that the profit for the Minister of the Economy would be around 700,000 euros in one of the deals and 7% of the value of the investment in the other – his personal profit was not mentioned. The American FBI examined Dritan Prifti's laptop and found that he was the person who took the bribes.

The alleged corruption of Meta has never been broadcast at such high levels of government in Albania. LSI and Meta initially rejected the video, claiming it was false and unclear. Meta, however, resigned from parliament three days later, thus removing his parliamentary immunity. He said he was willing to cooperate with the Attorney General's Office in its investigation. On 12 February, his immunity was removed.

== Opposition demonstrations ==
=== 21 January ===
According to police and the international media, an estimated 20,000 people attended an anti-government demonstration in Tirana, but the opposition claimed there were about 200,000 demonstrators. The large number of police coupled with continuous provocations and rising political tensions during the week preceding the demonstration, were major factors in the development of the protest. Anti-government chants were followed by clashes with a group of around 600 protesters who threw umbrellas at the riot police. When a group of 600 protesters started throwing stones and Molotov cocktails the police reacted using tear gas and batons.

Clashes continued for two hours until police forces and the Republican Guard began firing bullets into the air in an attempt to stave off and scare away the demonstrators. Live fire was at some point used against demonstrators in the crowd, killing three demonstrators on the spot and injuring another who died after a week-long coma. After the demonstrators began running away from the main square, hundreds were rounded up by plainclothes police as well as riot police. The opposition parties considered the shooting "extreme and unjustified."

Berisha denied that there was a specific order to shoot the protesters, but he confirmed that it was the Republican Guard that perpetrated the shooting. Nevertheless, the Albanian Constitution and its Penal Code allow the Republican Guard to non-fatally injure individuals who try to enter any governmental institution.

The Albanian Socialist Party stated that the background and the reasons that caused the escalation of this peaceful protest in Tirana, although similar to the situation in Tunisia, were very different. The leader of the opposition, Edi Rama, said: "People protested for a better Albania and lost their lives for an Albania we are forced to live with but that we shall definitely change."

=== 28 January ===
A non-violent demonstration in the form of a homage to the three victims of 21 January was held on 28 January in the same boulevard. The demonstration consisted in putting flowers where the 3 individuals were killed and lighting candles in their memory. Despite continuous calls by the ruling party and various international institutions and representatives to call off the demonstration because of the danger of repeated violence, the protest happened with no signs of violence. The estimates of attendance for the second demonstration were even higher than these of 21 January.

=== 4 February ===
The opposition organized simultaneous demonstrations in four cities: Tirana, Vlora, Korça and Lezha, though no provocations or signs of violence were reported. The protesters avoided marching in front of the Prime Minister's Office where the killings occurred on 21 January to avoid the possibility of repeated violence. The police claimed that 3,000 people marched in Tirana, 3,500 in Vlora, 2,000 in Korça and 600 in Lezha. However, the Socialist Party claimed that 40,000 people marched in Tirana, 30,000 in Vlora, 20,000 in Korça and 10,000 in Lezha. The opposition vowed to continue the weekly demonstrations across Albania.

== Coup d'etat allegations ==
Sali Berisha stated on 21 January that the three protesters who died during the opposition rally were killed by other demonstrators in an attempt to create victims and ultimately start a coup d'état against his government. On 22 January – only 24 hours after his first statement, he affirmed that they were shot but by the Republican Guard. However, his allegations of a coup d'état did not change. Berisha continued to claim that several independent institutions including most of the judiciary, the intelligence services and the President were part of the coup.

Albanian prosecutors immediately issued arrest warrants for six members of the Republican Guard over the three deaths. Berisha stated that warrants were illegal and ordered the state police not to carry them out. Despite this the six were arrested; however, three of the accused Guards were released by the prosecutor. Former president Alfred Moisiu and other politicians urged Berisha to cease violating the independence of the constitutional institutions such as the General Prosecutor's Office, the National Intelligence Services and the President of Albania. Berisha ultimately stated that he would counter the effects of the purported coup d'état by hiring Lady Gaga to perform in Albania during the summer.

== Reactions ==
=== Domestic ===
The Democratic Party claimed that many demonstrators were paid by the opposition to protest.

=== International ===
The major embassies in Tirana called for peace and calm without commenting on the government's actions during 21 January protests. Furthermore, there was only marginal reaction to the continuous attack on independent institutions by the executive represented by Berisha in Albania. The diplomatic community called for the opposition to cancel their peaceful protest in order to preserve the status quo and avoid any possibility of violent clashes.

=== Non-governmental organisations ===
Human Rights Watch said that Berisha should not interfere with the criminal investigation into the fatal shooting of the three anti-government protesters.

== See also ==
- 2010 French pension reform strikes
- 2010 student protest in London
