= Thoma Xhixho =

Albanian army leader and theorist (1920–2002)

- Xhixho in 1963
- Born: April 3, 1920; Suhë, Lunxhëri, Gjirokastër, Albania
- Died: November 29, 2002 (aged 82); Tirana, Albania
- Alma mater: Frunze Military Academy; Voroshilov Military Academy
- Spouse: Sofika Pecani Xhixho
- Children: Vera Xhixho; Piro Xhixho; Sokol Xhixho
- Military career
- Branch: Antifascist National Liberation Movement (LANÇ); National Liberation Army (UNÇ); Albanian National Army; Albanian People's Army
- Service years: 1941–1977
- Rank: Major General
- Commands: "Thoma Lula" Battalion ("Çamëria" Battalion); XIX Assault Brigade; I Infantry Division; VIII Infantry Division; V Infantry Division; XXII Autonomous Brigade; V Mountain Infantry Brigade; Unified School of Officers; Albanian Military Academy; Director of the Combat Training Directorate at Ministry of Defense
- Conflicts: World War II; Antifascist National Liberation War

Thoma Koço Xhixho (April 3, 1920 – November 29, 2002) was a major-general of the Albanian Army, military scientist, founder and first commander of the Albanian Military Academy. He is one of the framers of the Albanian Military Art, as well as the base documents and regulations for training in the Albanian Army. During World War II, Thoma Xhixho was one of the important leaders of the National Liberation Army (UNÇ). At the onset of the Antifascist National Liberation Movement (LANÇ) in Albania, he was one of its first members and one of the first commanders of the armed war against occupation forces.

Born in Suhë of the Lunxhëri region, Gjirokastër, Xhixho was raised in a family with longtime patriotic traditions. He came in touch early on with antifascism and the National Liberation Movement (LANÇ). Xhixho gradually rose through the ranks of the LANÇ and the National Liberation Army (UNÇ), from guerrilla unit commander, company kommissar, battalion kommissar and subsequently Brigade kommissar. During WWII he was at the command of some of the combat operations against the military forces of Fascist Italy and Nazi Germany in the I^{st} Operational Zone Vlorë-Gjirokastër-Mallakastër.

In the postwar years, Xhixho served at the helm of Divisions and other military units of the Albanian National Army (Ushtria Kombëtare Shqiptare) and contributed in raising and restructuring Albanian Army units, which had recently come out of the war. He was the commander of the Unified School of Officers and commander of the Albanian Military Academy. In the years 1960–1970, Xhixho was Director of the Army's Combat Training at the Defense Ministry.

== Early life and activity ==
Thoma Xhixho was born the youngest of fourteen children, to an Albanian family in Suhë, Lunxhëri, Gjirokastër County, in Southern Albania. His father, Kostandin (Koço) and his mother Katerina, along with his entire family worked in agriculture. Xhixho completes elementary school in Suhë and partly in Poliçan. At a time when most of the population of Albania did not receive any formal education or only completed elementary school, Xhixho with the support of his family, became the first from his birthplace to attend high school (gymnasium). He completed the gymnasium in Gjirokastër (today named "Asim Zeneli Gymnasium"). During these years, he helped and worked for the family who had sheltered him in the city and also worked briefly as an unpaid clerk in a law office in Gjirokastër. Upon finishing school, he returned to his family in Suhë, where he worked for some time in agriculture, in support of his family members. At this time he is accepted in a military instruction course organized and administered by the government. He is sent to Tirana and Caserta, Italy to study. With Albania's invasion by Fascist Italy, Xhixho returns to his homeland. During this time, he gets in touch with the communists and the National Liberation Movement (LANÇ) which was beginning to take shape. He gets in touch and works with some of the main figures of the LANÇ such as Bedri Spahiu, Tahir Kadare, Vasil Kati etc.

== WWII and the Antifascist National Liberation War ==
=== Antifascist Resistance, National Liberation War and the I^{st} Operational Zone ===
From April 1941, Xhixho became a member of the Antifascist National Liberation Movement. From January to December 1942, Thoma Xhixho was the commander of the local guerrilla unit and territorial armed militia. At the onset of the armed war, he was at the helm of the first actions for the disarmament of gendarmerie, army and carabinieri posts in the District of Gjirokastër. In cooperation with other leaders of the National Liberation Movement, Xhixho led some important actions of the guerrilla units in attacking and sabotaging forces and infrastructure of occupation troops and their collaborators in Gjirokastër and the I^{st} Operational Zone (ZIOp).

In December 1942, Xhixho actively works in the field to organize the armed war in the region of Lunxhëri. In January 1943, he is named Military-Political chief for the Lunxhëri-Rrëzë region. In April 1943, Xhixho became member of the Communist Party of Albania (PKSH). In August 1943, he assumes the duties of Kommissar of the Regional Command for Lunxhëri. In September 1943, the territorial guerrilla forces under the command of Thoma Xhixho, in conjunction with forces of the "Misto Mame" and "Asim Zeneli" battalions as well as other forces of the ZIOp, participate in the siege against forces of the Italian 151st Infantry Division "Perugia" based in Gërhot and in the attack against the Nazi mechanized convoy of the Wehrmacht's XXII Mountain Corps, attempting to enter Albanian territory in the Janinë-Gjirokastër direction.

From January 1944, Xhixho serves as komissar in the units of the IV Partisan Group 'Çamëria'. He initially serves as company kommissar and subsequently as kommissar of the 'Telo Plaku' battalion and kommissar of the 'Thoma Lula' battalion ('Çamëria' battalion). In April 1944, at the command of the battalions of the IV Partisan Group, he takes part in combat against German army units during Operation "Blindschleiche" (Blind Snake) against forces of the XXII Mountain Corps of the Wehrmacht. In May 1944, in the Congress of Përmet he attains one of the high ranks of the time, Major of the National Liberation Army (UNÇ). With the formation of the XIX Assault Brigade (on the basis of the IV Partisan Group 'Çamëria'), takes up the duty of Kommissar of this brigade. During the war, Xhixho's brother, Pano Xhixho was the Kommissar of the "Misto Mame" battalion and later assumes the duty of Kommissar of the III battalion of the VIII Assault Brigade. He is a Martyr of the Nation. At the helm of the partisan fighting formations, Thoma Xhixho participated in the liberation of the cities of Delvinë, Sarandë, Gjirokastër, Konispol, Libohovë etc.

== Post-War ==
=== Creation, consolidation and command of units of the Albanian National Army ===
Immediately after the Liberation of Albania, in 1945 Thoma Xhixho is selected to be part of the first group of officers sent to foreign Academies to pursue higher education. Together with this group of 15 military officers, he is sent to study at the Frunze Military Academy in the Soviet Union. In 1947, after returning to the homeland due to urgent needs of the army, he is immediately appointed in the capacity of chief of staff of the I Infantry Division in Tirana. During the Greek Provocations of 1948–1950, he serves as chief of staff of the VIII Infantry Division 'Korça' and the V Infantry Division 'Kurveleshi', deployed along the Albanian-Greek state border. With the reorganization of the structures of the Albanian Army, during 1950–1952 and 1954–1958, Xhixho serves as commander of the XXII Autonomous Brigade based in Burrel and commander of the V Mountain Infantry Brigade based in Gjirokastër.

== Founding and command of military schools and high academic courses ==
=== Commander of the Unified School of Officers ===
In December 1952, Xhixho is appointed commander of the Unified School of Officers in Tirana. In this capacity, he became the first director and organizer of the High 2-year Course for Officers. This also constituted the first experience in Albania in the creation of an academic preparatory program of this level for career officers with experience.

=== Founder and Commander of the Army's Higher School (Military Academy) ===
On May 10, 1958, the Albanian Military Academy is created for the first time in the history of Albania (initially named the Higher Military School). Thoma Xhixho was placed in charge of the formation of the Academy (the Higher Military School). Order no. 400 dated 1958, issued by the Defense Minister colonel-general Beqir Balluku, "On the creation of the Higher Military School", states: "The task to form the School is assigned to Colonel Thoma Xhixho".

Xhixho together with members of his staff Niko Dulaku, Ferik Hoda, Elami Hado, Veip Aliaj, Hysni Rusi and Dhimitër Ndrenika began working for the establishment of this institution. The Academy was being created under conditions when the Albanian Army did not inherit an institution of this kind. There had not been such a high level institution during the entire existence of the Albanian Army and as a result, there was no experience in this field. The only existing experience, was that of the High Course for Officers, which was also created and organized by Thoma Xhixho. The creation and upbuilding of the Academy was accomplished through working gradually. Initially, six-month and one-year courses were created for combined arms and artillery officers and later on, the rest one by one, until the Academy was completed and could prepare all arms branches and services needed by the army.

In this manner, the Albanian Army, for the first time created a high military institution, organized and directed by an Albanian cadre of officers and lectors. The Academy became an important scientific center and a laboratory in the refinement of the Military Art. And the rightful recipient of this honor was Thoma Xhixho, as the first commander of the Military Academy, who together with his staff laid its foundations.

In 1960, Xhixho went to study at the Voroshilov Military Academy and upon his return in 1961, is reappointed commander of the Military Academy. Major-general Thoma Xhixho was the commander of the Academy from its creation in 1958 until 1966. Subsequently, he returned to the Academy as deputy commander, General Instructor and Chief of the Military-Scientific Branch during 1972–1977. General Xhixho served as external counsel and lector at the Military Academy until 1981. He remains to this day one of the longest serving commanders and instructors at the Albanian Military Academy, being at its service for more than 13 years.

== Combat Training and the Military Art ==
=== Contribution to the Albanian Army's Combat Training as Director of the Combat Training Directorate ===
From 1966 until 1972 General Thoma Xhixho has served in the capacity of Director of the Army's Combat Training Directorate and during this time he was editor-in-chief of the Political-Military Journal (a central organ of the Ministry of Defense). During this period, the general participated in the organization and preparation of every military exercise and was continuously at the helm, serving under the Chief of the General Staff lieutenant-general Petrit Dume. To experiment and put to practice The Theses of the Defense Council, The Military Art, and Combat Regulations, under the direction of major-general Xhixho and the General Staff, several large military exercises were conducted, such as "Tomorri-68", "Shpiragu-69", "Drini-71", "Peza-72", "Kaptina-73", "Semani-74" etc.

A number of studies and scientific articles on the preparation and operation of the army are attributed to Xhixho. He has made important scientific contributions in the study of combat training methods, tactical aspects of defensive and offensive combat of various army units etc. A series of studies on military history of the Albanian people, bear his authorship. Xhixho has been a coauthor in all the scientific sessions and conferences organized at the Military Academy on issues of learning, education and scientific qualification. Until the end of his engagement in the Albanian Military, General Xhixho dedicated more than 20 years to military schools, education, schooling and combat training in the army.

=== Framer of the Albanian Military Art of Popular War and Chief of the Military-Scientific Branch ===
General Thoma Xhixho was one of the three members of the Permanent Nucleus of the Generalization Study Group attached to the Popular Defense Ministry, together with major-general Ernest Jakova and major-general Spiro Shalësi. The Permanent Nucleus of the Group prepared and framed the fundamental documents which laid out the Military Art of Popular War, such as "The Report of the Defense Ministry" of 1963 and the "Military Theoretical Material" ("The Theses of the Defense Council") of 1967, materials which underwent discussion on a larger scale with the participation of the highest cadre of officers in the Army. These materials became the first fundamental documents for the strategic orientation of the country's defense. During the years 1975–1977 General Xhixho was the deputy director of the group for the review of the Army's principal document "The Theses of the Defense Council", a task assigned to the Academy, particularly the Scientific Branch directed by Xhixho. This reviewed document became the basis for all subsequent scientific studies at army level.

== Life after retirement ==
Thoma Xhixho retired in 1977. Meanwhile, he also became involved in the activity of the National Organization of the Veterans of the National Antifascist Liberation War, where he was elected to its presidency. General Xhixho is one of the founders of the National Organization for the Martyrs of the Nation. He was a member of the Presidency of the Society of the Patriotic Union of Military Personnel in Reserve and an active member of the "Lunxhëria" society. In the years of the deep changes brought about by the shift in the political and socio-economic system, the General did not seek involvement in politics and maintained a distanced stance from all sides of political thought and action during this transitional period for the country.

=== During the Kosovo Liberation War ===
During February–March 1999, upon request from the command of the Kukësi Division and interest by the Defense Ministry, General Thoma Xhixho, together with a group of retired high-ranking military officers, went on an assistance and advisory mission in support of the military units of the Kukësi Division and its headquarters. The General, together with friends, colleagues and the command staff of the Division, visited the troops and personnel of the Albanian Army deployed near the border as well as the fortification belts and mechanized units along the Northeastern front, in order to assess the state of the troops, combat-readiness and the measures taken for the defense of the state border against an eventual aggression.

== Legacy ==
In November 2022, the book titled "Gjeneral Thoma Xhixho I Pari Komandant i Akademisë Ushtarake Shqiptare" ("General Thoma Xhixho The First Commander of the Albanian Military Academy") was published, together with "Koncepte për Artin Ushtarak" ("Concepts on the Military Art"), a collection of studies, analyses and articles over the years authored by General Thoma Xhixho. General Xhixho is the recipient of orders and medals from the Presidium of the People's Assembly, Council of Ministers of the Republic of Albania, and countries such as Ukraine, Russia etc.

General Thoma Xhixho holds the title "Honor of the Gjirokastër County" awarded posthumously.

== Decorations awarded to General Thoma Xhixho ==
- Medal of Liberation (February 2, 1945)
- Medal of Remembrance (November 26, 1945)
- Medal of Bravery (year 1946)
- Order "Partisan Star" III Class (year 1946)
- Order of Bravery (November 27, 1946)
- Order of Scanderbeg III Class (July 7, 1947)
- Order of Military Service II Class (July 11, 1949)
- Order of Military Service II Class (January 2, 1950)
- Order of Military Service II Class (November 22, 1950)
- Order Partisan Star II Class (November 20, 1952)
- Order "Partisan Star" (June 25, 1953)
- Medal for the 10th Anniversary of the Army (July 10, 1953)
- Order of Scanderbeg III Class (June 22, 1959)
- Order of Scanderbeg II Class (June 25, 1963)
- Medal of the 50th Anniversary of the Heroic Defense of Kiev (May 14, 1995)
- Medal of the 60th Anniversary of the Liberation of the Fatherland
- Medal of the 40th Anniversary of the PLA
