= M33 helmet =

Italian steel combat helmet

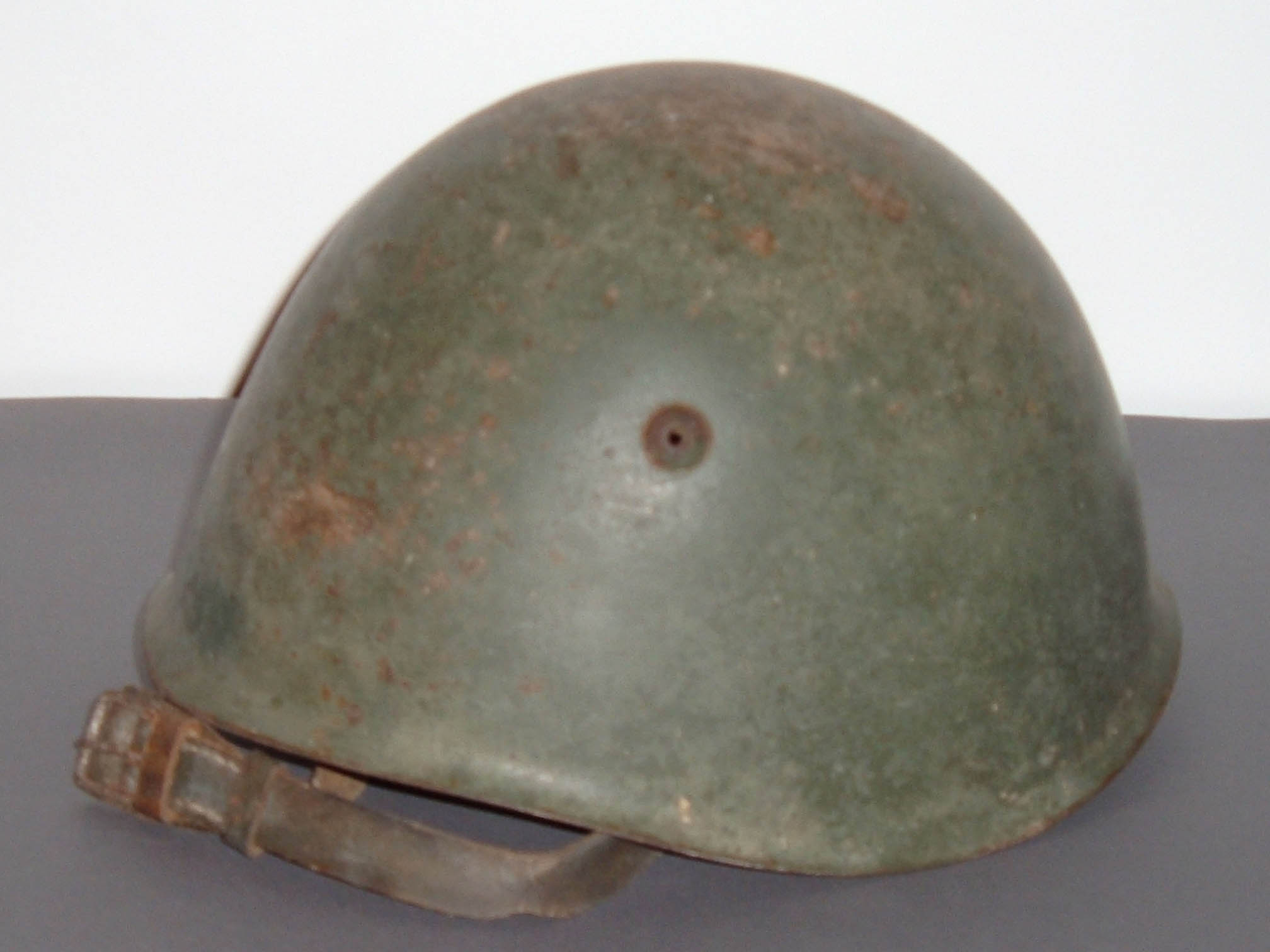
- View of an M33 shell
- Type: Combat helmet
- Place of origin: Italy

Service history
- In service: 1933-1992 (Italy)
- Used by: See Users for details
- Wars: Second Italo-Ethiopian War; Spanish Civil War; World War II; Ecuadorian–Peruvian War; Croatian War of Independence; Bosnian War; Kosovo War

Production history
- Designer: Nicola Leszl
- Manufacturer: SMV (Smalteria e Metallurgia Veneta Spa) of Bassano del Grappa, Torino Arsenal

Specifications
- Weight: 1.2 kilograms (2.64 pounds)

The M33 Helmet (Elmetto Modello 1933 in Italian) is a steel combat helmet designed in the 1930s in Italy, and was the standard combat helmet of the Regio Esercito up to World War II, and of the Esercito Italiano well into the Cold War.

== Background ==
Dating back from 1925, the Italian Army had engaged in experiments to find a new model of combat helmet that could replace the aging and not completely satisfactory Adrian helmet adopted in 1915 upon the country's entry into World War I; coupled to this was that the Adrian was originally a French design, and it was probably felt (under the fascist regime) that an Italian-designed model was more appropriate.

After lengthy trials (with prototypes from many Italian and foreign firms) in 1932, it was decided to adopt one of them as the M31 helmet. However this model (recognizable by the small crest on its top) was not completely satisfactory, because its cupolar blowhole design was not seen as being efficient, and was rather perceived as a structural weakness. By replacing it with three ventilation holes (two on the sides and one on the rear), the M33 and was fully adopted on November 29, 1934.

The M33 helmet would first enter use in the Second Italo-Ethiopian War in October 1935, followed by the Spanish Civil War in 1936, with Italy sending aid to the Nationalists under Francisco Franco as military aid. Upon the war's conclusion in 1939, departing Italian volunteers left approximately 50,000-60,000 M33 helmets behind, which saw use with the Spanish Army until the late 1970s when they were sold off following Franco's death.

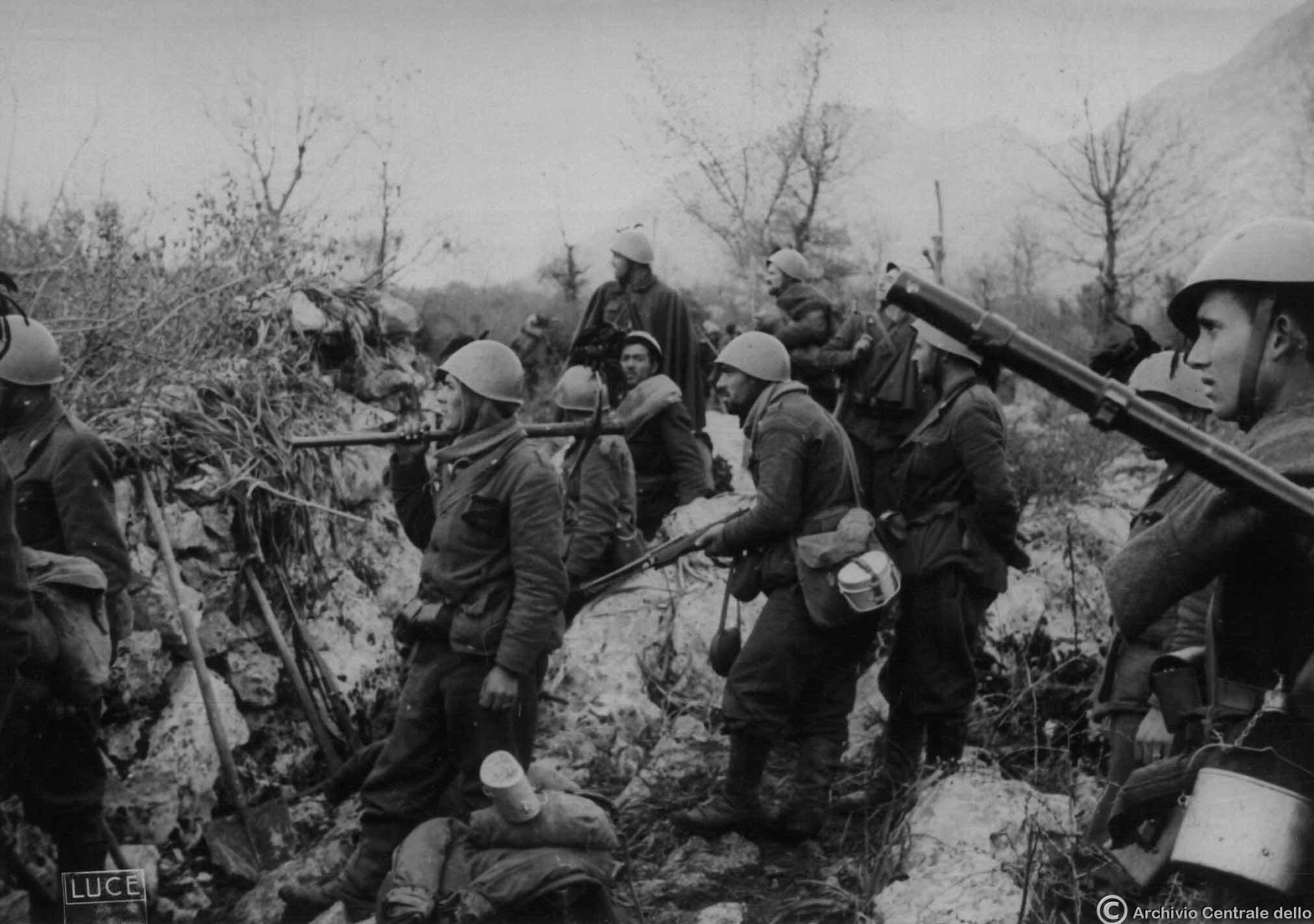
Italians in Greece 1941, seen wearing the M33

In 1944–1945 following the Armistice of Cassibile, the British attempted to replace the M33 with the Brodie helmet, however only two divisions had switched by the time the war ended. Meanwhile, the Americans transferred their M1 helmets, but not enough to completely re-equip any large units. After the war, it was decided to retain the M33 in use with the newly formed Italian Army, remaining in use to the end of the 1980s, with production restarting in the 1950s. Said examples are nearly identical, but have a slightly different interior headband, a different serial number scheme, and a canvas chinstrap replacing the leather chinstrap.

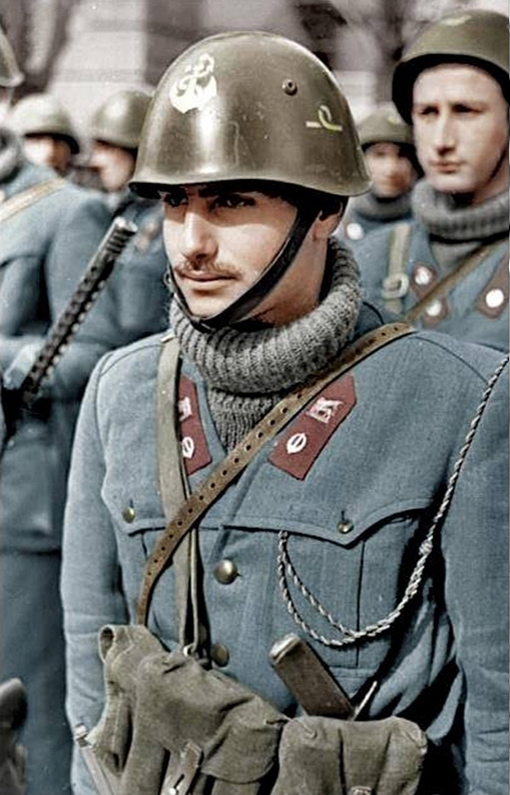
A sub-lieutenant of the San Marco Division (RSI) wearing a M33 helmet circa 1944. Note the anchor emblem and the rank insignia on the helmet

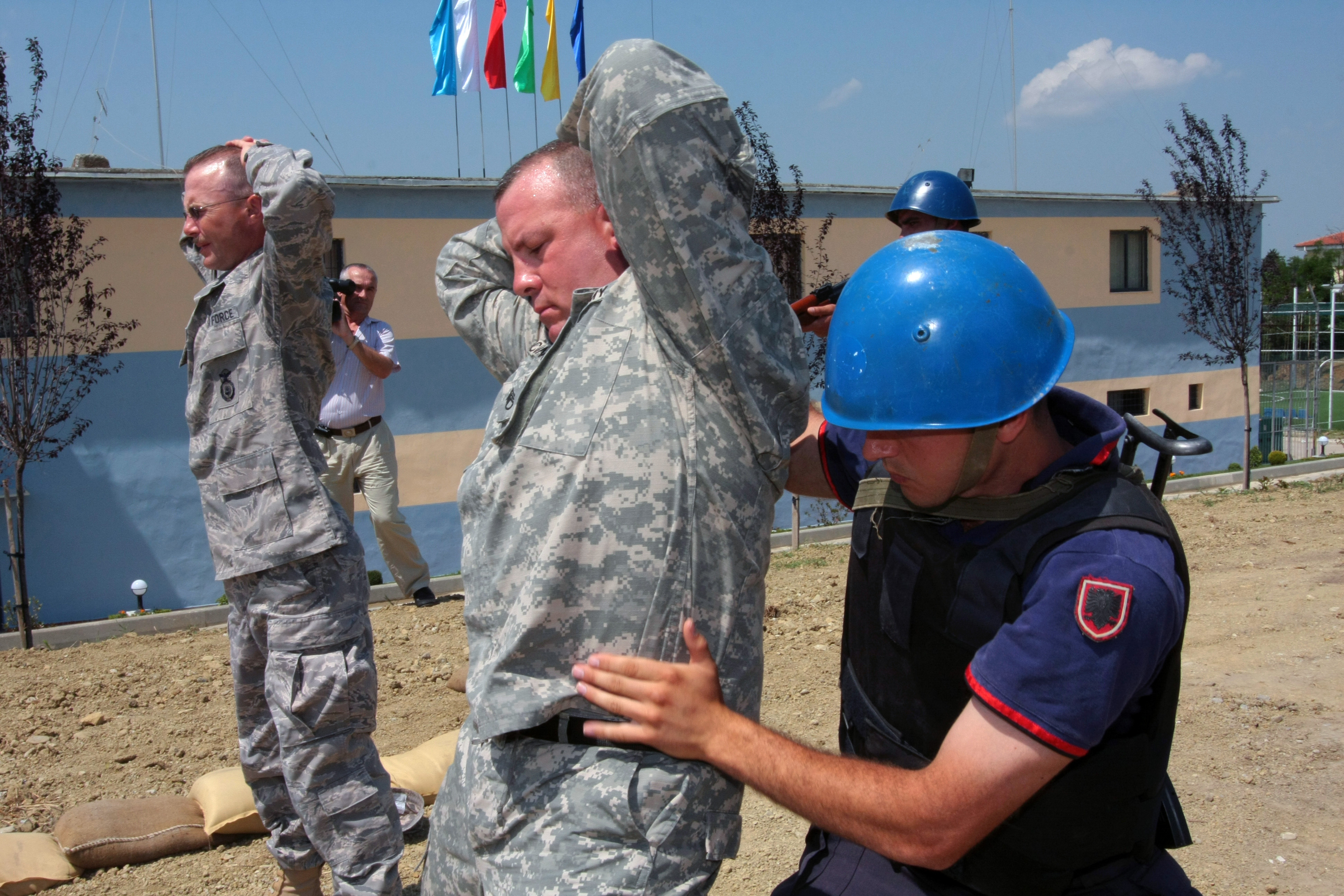
An Albanian army MP wearing a M33

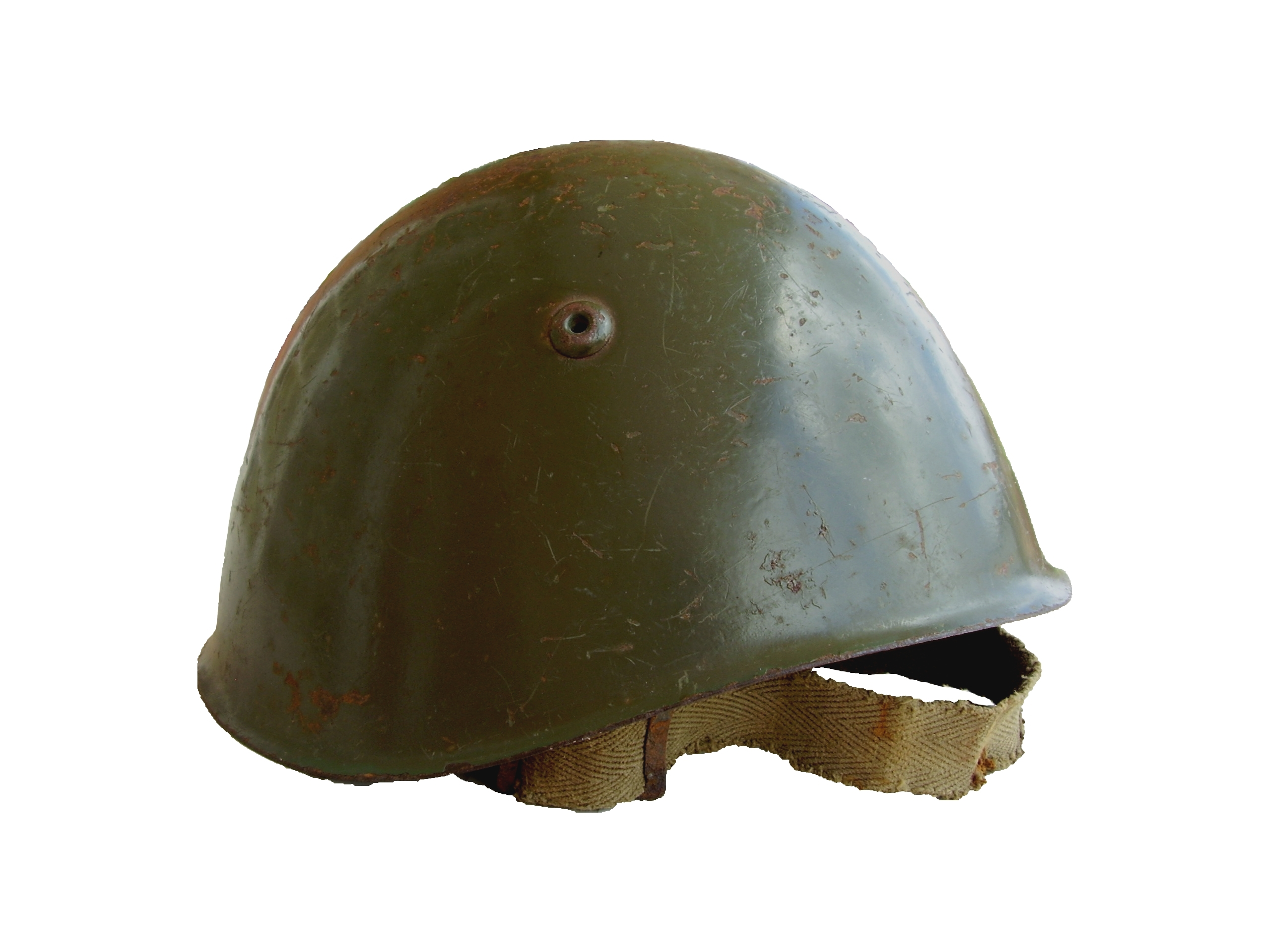
Italian M33/47 from 1956

== Users ==
- Albania: Initially issued to protectorate forces in Italian-occupied Albania. Passed on to the communist government where it would remain in use until the Sino-Soviet split in the 1960s.
- Argentina: The Argentine Army imported a small number of M33s during the late 1930s.
- Bosnia and Herzegovina: Obtained from JNA stockpiles.
- Bulgaria: A locally-designed copy would enter service in 1951, though it was likely replaced by the early 1990s.
- Ecuador: Originally order in 1938, though not fully issued upon the start of the Ecuadorian–Peruvian War. Replaced by the M1 helmet shortly after World War II.
- Germany: worn by Italian SS volunteers during the Italian Civil War.
- Kingdom of Italy: Was the standard-issue helmet of the Regio Esercito.
  - Italian Social Republic
- Italy: replaced by the SEPT-2 helmet starting in 1992.
- Spain: Provided as aid to the Nationalists, with deliveries starting in 1938. A significant number were imported and served on long after the civil war ended.
- Peru: Supplemented M34 Adrian helmets first delivered in the mid-1930s. Numbers were bolstered by capture of Ecuadorian examples, but were replaced by the M1 helmet starting in 1956.
- Yugoslavia: Obtained from Italian forces at the end of the war and used by the JNA, but replaced by the M59 helmet starting in 1960.
- Finland Used in small quantities by Finnish forces in World War II
