= Pano Xhixho =

Albanian partisan leader, World War II (1916–1946)

- Xhixho circa. 1945
- Born: August 29, 1916; Suhë, Lunxhëri, Gjirokastër, Albania
- Died: January 26, 1946 (aged 29) Tirana, Albania
- Branch: Antifascist National Liberation Movement (LANÇ); National Liberation Army (UNÇ)
- Service years: 1940–1945
- Rank: Captain
- Commands: "Rinia" unit "Prokop Meksi" unit "Misto Mame" Battalion; III Battalion VIII Assault Brigade
- Conflicts: World War II; Antifascist National Liberation War

Pano Koço Xhixho (August 29, 1916 – January 26, 1946) was a prominent Albanian partisan commander during World War II and Martyr of the Nation in Albania. He was one of the first fighters of the Antifascist National Liberation Movement (LANÇ) and among the first commanders of the armed war in the District of Gjirokastër and the I^{st} Operational Zone Vlorë-Gjirokastër-Mallakastër. With the formation of the Albanian National Liberation Army (Ushtria Nacionalçlirimtare Shqiptare), he served in command of several partisan units and formations, including the "Misto Mame" battalion and III battalion of the VIII Assault Brigade.

Born in Suhë of the Lunxhëri region, Gjirokastër, Xhixho was raised in a family with longtime patriotic traditions. In the beginnings of the National Liberation Movement (LNÇ), together with his brother Thoma Xhixho, gave an important contribution in the inspiration, mobilization, escalation and command of the armed war against the occupation forces of Fascist Italy and Nazi Germany in the I^{st} Operational Zone Vlorë-Gjirokastër-Mallakastër and beyond. After the Liberation of Albania, Pano Xhixho served in command of units of the VIII Assault Brigade during the operation of the VI Assault Division in Yugoslavia, against Wehrmacht forces in support of the Yugoslav partisans.

== Early life and activity ==
Pano Xhixho was born to an Albanian family in Suhë, Lunxhëri, Gjirokastër District, Albania. As a young man, due to his weak health, he began working as an apprentice in a tailor shop in the city of Gjirokastër. During the beginnings of the National Liberation Movement (LANÇ), he works with some of its main figures such as Bedri Spahiu, Vasil Kati, Myzafer Asqeriu etc. In December 1940, Xhixho's brothers participated in an attack organized by the local inhabitants of Suhë, against the ammunition and armament depots of the occupying Royal Italian Army, located on the road from Gjirokastër to Zagori, near Suhë. This attack resulted in the destruction of the depot. One of his brothers was subsequently arrested by occupation forces in conjunction with this attack and sentenced to death by a military tribunal of the fascist authorities.

During the Greco-Italian War, Pano Xhixho was initially enlisted, among other young men of military age, in the Albanian 'Tomorri' battalion. The occupying Royal Italian Army attempted to deploy and use Albanian Army formations in the war front against their will. Xhixho considered the war of the Greek people righteous and together with many other brothers-in-arms participated in a mass desertion of the Albanian soldiers from the front. He was subsequently arrested by Greek security forces of the ASFALIA battalions and together with other Albanian military personnel was sent to an internment camp in Crete, Greece where he actively propagandized to boost the morale of the Albanian soldiers held captive and keep their patriotic fervor alive.

== WWII and the Antifascist National Liberation War ==
After his release from the internment camps and return to Albania, in the beginning of 1942, Pano Xhixho became a member of the Antifascist National Liberation Movement (LANÇ) and as a member of the territorial guerrilla units, he participated in the first actions of the armed war, namely in Kakavijë, Libohovë etc. In the spring of 1942, he took part in the first actions of the guerrilla units for the production and dissemination of propaganda materials of the LNÇ for armed war against occupation forces, in several regions of the District of Gjirokastër. He played an active role in the creation of National Liberation Councils of the Antifascist Youth and became commander of several cheta-s and guerrilla units in the region.

In the spring of 1943, the command staff of the I^{st} Operational Zone and the political leadership for the District of Gjirokastër, placed Pano in charge of the formation of cheta "Rinia", an armed guerrilla unit composed of young men and women from the regions of Libohovë, Lunxhëri, Kurvelesh, Delvinë and other parts of Labëri. Pano Xhixho successfully lead this unit in all of its engagements. Subsequently, he took up the duty of komissar of the cheta "Prokop Meksi", a partisan guerrilla unit, which became part of the "Misto Mame" battalion.

In the second half of 1943, after the formation of the "Misto Mame" battalion, Xhixho became the komissar of this formation. At the command of this battalion, now part of the IV Partisan Group "Çamëria" of the UNÇSH, his leadership was distinguished in the defense during Operation Blindschleiche (Blind Snake), particularly on the Dhivër-Navaricë defense line against forces of the XXII Mountain Corps of the Wehrmacht. His leadership was also distinguished in the attack against the enemy garrison in Libohovë in August 1943, in the attack on the enemy garrison in Konispol in March 1944, etc.

On April 25, 1944, with the formation of the VIII Assault Brigade he is appointed komissar of the III battalion. In May 1944, the III battalion under the command of Pano Xhixho together with other units of the VIII Assault Brigade was tasked with the security and protection of the Congress of Përmet.

In the beginning of June 1944, at the command of this battalion, Pano Xhixho participated in combat against forces of the 1st Mountain Division and 104th Jäger Division during Operation Gemsbock (Gemsbok) organized by the German Wehrmacht.

At the end of June 1944, in command of the III battalion, Pano Xhixho takes part in the fierce fighting that occurred during Operation Úhu (Owl), against forces of the Wehrmacht's 1st Mountain Division, 99th Jäger Regiment and 27th Jäger Regiment. This operation was a renewd offensive by the German command with the aim to liquidate UNÇ forces still operating in the mountainous area between the Vjosa River and Drino River where the VIII Assault Brigade was located at the time, as well as capture or liquidate the command staff of the I^{st} Operational Zone together with SAS and SOE officers part of the British liaisson mission attached to the command staff of the ZIOp, which had set up camp in the area. At the helm of the fighting formations of the VIII Assault Brigade, Pano Xhixho fought heroically and was distinguished in some of the decisive fighting in thwarting the German effort to encircle and destroy the Brigade and in the breakthrough of enemy lines by partisan forces to evade encirclement together with the attached civilian population. He was particularly distinguished in the battle of the Gorge of Këlcyrë, where 250 men of the III battalion under his command, successfully perpetrated a surprise attack upon German encirclement forces, causing heavy casualties to the enemy. This action was designed to slow down the advance of the German encirclement forces and deceive the enemy on the intentions of the VIII Assault Brigade. During the fighting near Skore village, he successfully lead his battalion against a numerically and logistically superior enemy during close combat, thwarting the German advance from the southern end of the Zagori Valley. During the maneuvers of the Brigade to break through the encirclement, Pano Xhixho lead the fight against a heavily fortified enemy position in the village of Sopik.

In November 1944, at the helm of the III battalion of the VIII Assault Brigade, komissar Pano Xhixho participated in the Operation for the Liberation of Tirana, the capital of Albania. His battalion, together with the IV battalion of the Brigade, attacked the city from the southwestern direction, taking the fortified enemy position at the "Shkumbini" barracks, fighting its way northward and taking the section of the city today known as Tirana e Re (New Tirana), reaching "Rruga e Kavajës" (Kavaja Street) and linking up with the right flank of the I Assault Brigade which was attacking from the north side of the city. Upon the liberation of the capital, in recognition of his displayed actions, abilities and talent in battle, Pano Xhixho was to be given command of the VIII Assault Brigade and continue the march north in pursuit of the enemy. However, due to sharp disagreements within the leadership of the UNÇSH, he was ultimately not granted command, but continued to remain one of the most prominent leaders of this formation, a symbol of its fighting spirit and member of the command staff of the VIII Assault Brigade as well as the VI Assault Division of the UNÇSH.

In February 1944, Pano Xhixho was at the command of the III battalion during the Battle for the Liberation of Višegrad in Yugoslavia (today in Bosnia-Herzegovina), where the VI Assault Division of the Albanian National Liberation Army (UNÇSH) was fighting, as part of its mission in support of the Yugoslav partisans with the objective to disrupt the Wehrmacht's retreat northward and liberate occupied territory. During this operation, Xhixho personally lead a group of partisans of his battalion in an attack on a fortified German heavy machine gun position impeding the partisan advance within the city. While storming inside the barricaded enemy position, Xhixho was heavily wounded by shrapnel in his head losing his right eye and died later due to medical complications from this wound. Commander Pano Xhixho participated in the operations for the liberation of the cities of Gjirokastër, Tiranë, Podgorica, Višegrad etc.

== Legacy ==
A leader loved and respected by the people, and a charismatic commander with extensive popularity within the ranks of the partisan army, the leadership of LANÇ and the ZIOp, Pano Xhixho was considered by many of his comrades-in-arms, members of the UNÇSH and contemporaries, as a revolutionary figure. Therefore, after his death, one of the main agricultural cooperatives in the District of Gjirokastër was named after him. A street in the city of Gjirokastër and a school of secondary education in the district were also given his name in honor of his memory. Several folk songs, as well as works of poetry and prose in commemoration of his life and deeds have also been written. While Xhixho's promising life and career was abruptly cut short due to his premature death at a young age, he is to this day remembered and celebrated as one of the most popular and talented commanders of the UNÇSH and the armed war in Albania during WWII.

In November 2022, the book titled "General Thoma Xhixho The First Commander of the Albanian Military Academy" was published. A separate chapter summarizing some of the highlights of the life and activity of commander Pano Xhixho is also included in this publication Pano Xhixho is the recipient of orders and medals from the Republic of Albania and Republic of Yugoslavia. He is a Martyr of the Nation in Albania and is buried in the City of Gjirokastër Cemetery of the Martyrs of the Nation.

== Docorations awarded to Pano Xhixho ==
Sources:

- Medal of Liberation (Albania)
- Medal of Remembrance (Albania)
- Medal of Bravery (Albania)
- People's Order of Merit II Class (Yugoslavia)
