= Armed Forces Academy (Albania) =

Military academy in Tirana, Albania

- Akademia e Forcave të Armatosura
- Type: Military Academy
- Established: May 10, 1958
- Rector: Ruzhdi Kuçi
- Students: Officers of the Albanian Armed Forces
- Location: Tirana, Albania
- Website: www.tradoc.mil.al

The Armed Forces Academy (AFA) (Albanian: Akademia e Forcave të Armatosura) is a military education institution which trains military officers (for the army, navy and air force) in Albania.

== History ==
The Academy of the Armed Forces was established decision of the government on 10 May 1958, in the Rrapit i Treshit District of Tirana, initially with the name Military High School. The school bore the conventional number of Military Department No. 2002. The Council of Ministers, on October 28, 1961 decided that on the basis of the Military High School to establish the "Military Academy of the People's Republic of Albania" with a three year educational program accredited by the Ministry of Education.

By a special decision of the Council of Ministers, on 5 January 1963, the Military Academy was renamed to the "Mehmet Shehu Military Academy", honoring the 50th birthday of the then-Prime Minister Mehmet Shehu. Years later, in December 1992, the institution was renamed the General Staff Academy. The Academy was in 1994 renamed to the Defense Academy of Albania. In 1998 the Defense Academy was accepted as a full member of the council of military academies of NATO. In 2004, the Defense Academy was renamed the Spiro Moisiu Defense Academy. In early 2012, the Academy was renamed the Academy of the Armed Forces. It consisted of 2 Faculties:

- the Faculty of Security and Defense (remnants of the former Spiro Moisiu Defense Academy)
- the Center for Foreign Languages and the Faculty of General Education (remnants of the former Skanderbeg Military Academy)

== Leaders ==
The leaders of this unique institution over the years have been:

- Major General Thoma Xhixho (1958–1961)
- Major General Spiro Shalesi (1961–1964)
- Major General Ernest Jakova (1964–1967)
- Colonel Koli Mborja (1968–1970)
- Lieutenant General Vaskë Gjino (1970–1974)
- Colonel Mendu Tetova (1974–1975)
- Major General Vehbi Hoxha (1975–1977)
- Prof. Spiro Adhami (1977–1981)
- Major General Kostaq Karoli (1982–1991)
- Colonel Halim Abazi (1991–1993)
- Brigadier General Ali Koçeku (1994–1997)
- Major General Ruzhdi Gjatoja (1998–2000)
- Colonel Flamur Skrapalliu (2000–2001)
- Colonel Selim Shiroka (2001–2003)
- Colonel Dhori Spirollari (2003–2005)
- Rear Admiral Kudret Çela (2005–2008)
- Colonel Nexhbedin Shehu (2009–2010)
- Colonel Kristaq Xharo (May 2010-July 2011)
- Colonel Perikli Koliçi (August 2011-September 2012)
- Colonel Agim Sula (September 2012-September 2014)
- Colonel Idriz Hazhiaj (October 2014-November 2015)
- Colonel Ruzhdi Kuçi (January 2016-December 2017)

== See also ==
- List of universities in Albania
- Quality Assurance Agency of Higher Education
- List of colleges and universities
- List of colleges and universities by country
