= Republican Guard (Albania) =

Paramilitary government agency

Republican Guard of Albania
- Garda e Republikës së Shqipërisë
- Coat of arms of the Republican Guard of Albania
- Active: 1928–1939; 1945–present
- Country: Albania
- Allegiance: Albanian Police; Albanian Armed Forces
- Branch: Independent
- Type: Republican guard
- Role: Protection of Personalities and Objects of Special Importance; Ceremonial Guard
- Size: 700
- Headquarters: Tirana
- March: Marsh Mirësevini (Inspection March)
- Anniversaries: June 24
- Website: Official website

Commanders
- General director: Simon Zereci (acting)

Insignia
- Flag

The Republican Guard (Albanian: Garda e Republikës) is a paramilitary government agency of Albania mandated by law to protect high-ranking state officials, including the President of Albania, as well as certain national properties, high-ranking foreign visitors and diplomatic offices. It is mostly subordinate to the Ministry of Internal Affairs, except that the unit responsible for the president's security being under the authority of the president.

The Guard was established on 24 June 1928 as part of the Albanian Armed Forces. By order of the Minister of the Interior date 15.06.2025 Senior Director Simon Zereci is appointed for the exercise of powers and duties of the General Director of the Guard of the Republic of Albania.

== History ==
=== Royal Guard (1928–1939) ===
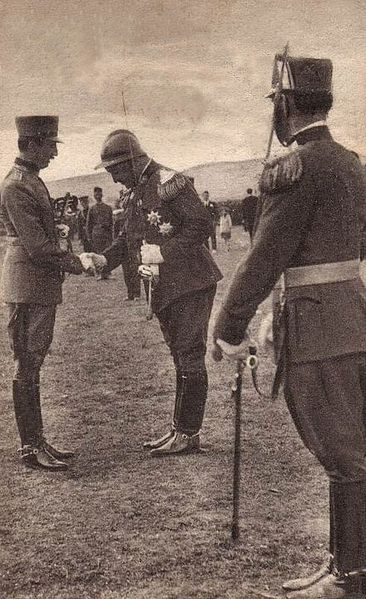
Xhemal Aranitasi and King Zog I

The Republican Guard was established in the late 1920s when President Ahmet Zogu (later King Zog I) demanded the reorganization of the Albanian Armed Forces and the creation of a special unit, separated from the Militias and Gendarmerie, whose main duty would be to protect the highest state personalities and the important buildings (such as Institutions; Banks; personalities houses; etc.). The creation of the Guard was decreed on 24 June 1928. Its secondary responsibility was public duties in Tirana, the national capital.

On 1 September 1928, Albania was transformed into a kingdom, and President Zogu became Zog I, King of the Albanians. The Guard changed the name to "Royal Guard of Albania", but the duties in most of them remain the same. Hysen Selmani was appointed its first commandant.

In November 1929, the law "On the Organization of Armed Forces" was promulgated, which changed the structure of the unit. The structure of the Guard subsequently consisted of:

- The Guard Command
- 1 battalion (21 Officers; 37 Sub-Officers; 412 Guards)
- 1 platoon of cavalry
- Guards Band and Bugles
- Military Depot

=== Socialist Republican Guard (1945–1991) ===
After the World War II, the Guard would be named Special Battalion of the General Staff, being a structure within the People's Defense Division (DMP).

In February 1947, the department was renamed the Republican Guard Department. By the end of the 1940s, the Guard began to recruit servicemen through the conscription service; until then it consisted of ex-Partisans of the Albanian National Liberation Army (UNÇSH). In 1951, the Guard became part of the Ministry of Internal Affairs, which charged the battalion with the function of preserving and securing the high-ranking state officials and important members of the communist party, including their residential areas in Ish-Blloku. During these years until November 1968, the Guard was strengthened and modernized, following which the guard battalion numbered around 600 personnel of all ranks.

After the Soviet-Albanian split and the Warsaw Pact invasion of Czechoslovakia in 1968, the Guard underwent a structural and quantitative change. It was increased from 1 to 3 battalions. In addition, there were 4 battalions of reservists, a central Command and permanent staff with officers. Also, the Artillery Command was created.

In 1976, with the adoption of the new Constitution, the name of the Guard changed to the Republican Guard Regiment of the Socialist Republic of Albania.

Its organization included:

- Command Center
- Political department
- General Staff of the Guard Regiment
- Artillery Command
- 3 active infantry battalions (1st to 3rd Battalions, Republican Guard)
- 4 reserve battalions (4th to 7th Battalions (Volunteers), Republican Guard)
- Instruction Center in Mullet
- Autonomous bases (Durrës, Vlorë, Pogradec, Lezhë and Korçë)
- 1 anti-aircraft battery equipped with ZPU
- 1 artillery battery equipped with ZiS-3
- 1 company each of Flamethrower; Tanks; Engineers Corps; Chemical Corps; Support Corps and Transport Support
- 1 armored transport Platoon
- Regimental Band

On 4 February 1984 the Presidium of the People's Assembly awarded the "Order of the National Flag" to the Republican Guard Regiment.

=== 1991–present ===
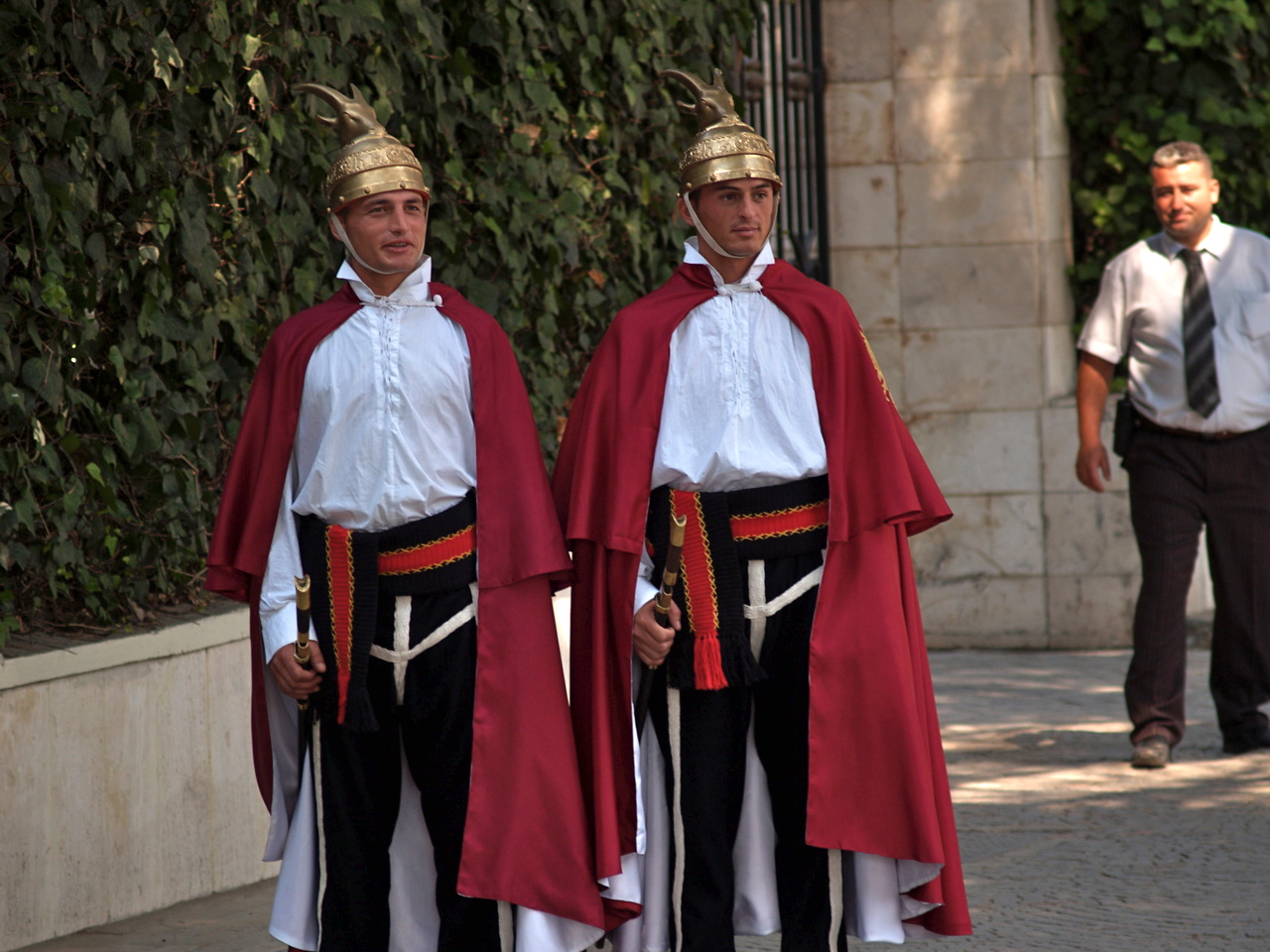
Members of the Republican Guard in traditional uniforms in September 2005.

On 9 September 1992, the Albanian Parliament adopted the law "On the Republican Guard", which stipulated that the guard, which at the time was named the Specialized Military Unit, would be the official military guard of honour for the state. In 1993, based on the June 1928 decree of the Guard's creation, the Republican Guard was recreated in its original form. In appreciation for the unit's participation in the Albanian unrest of 1997, the Republican Guard was decorated with the Golden Medal of the Eagle (“Medalja e Artë e Shqiponjës”) on its diamond jubilee in 1998. In January 2011, six members of the guard were arrested over the deaths of four civilian protesters in an opposition demonstration outside Prime Minister Sali Berisha's office. Three of them were later released by the general prosecutor.

== Mission ==
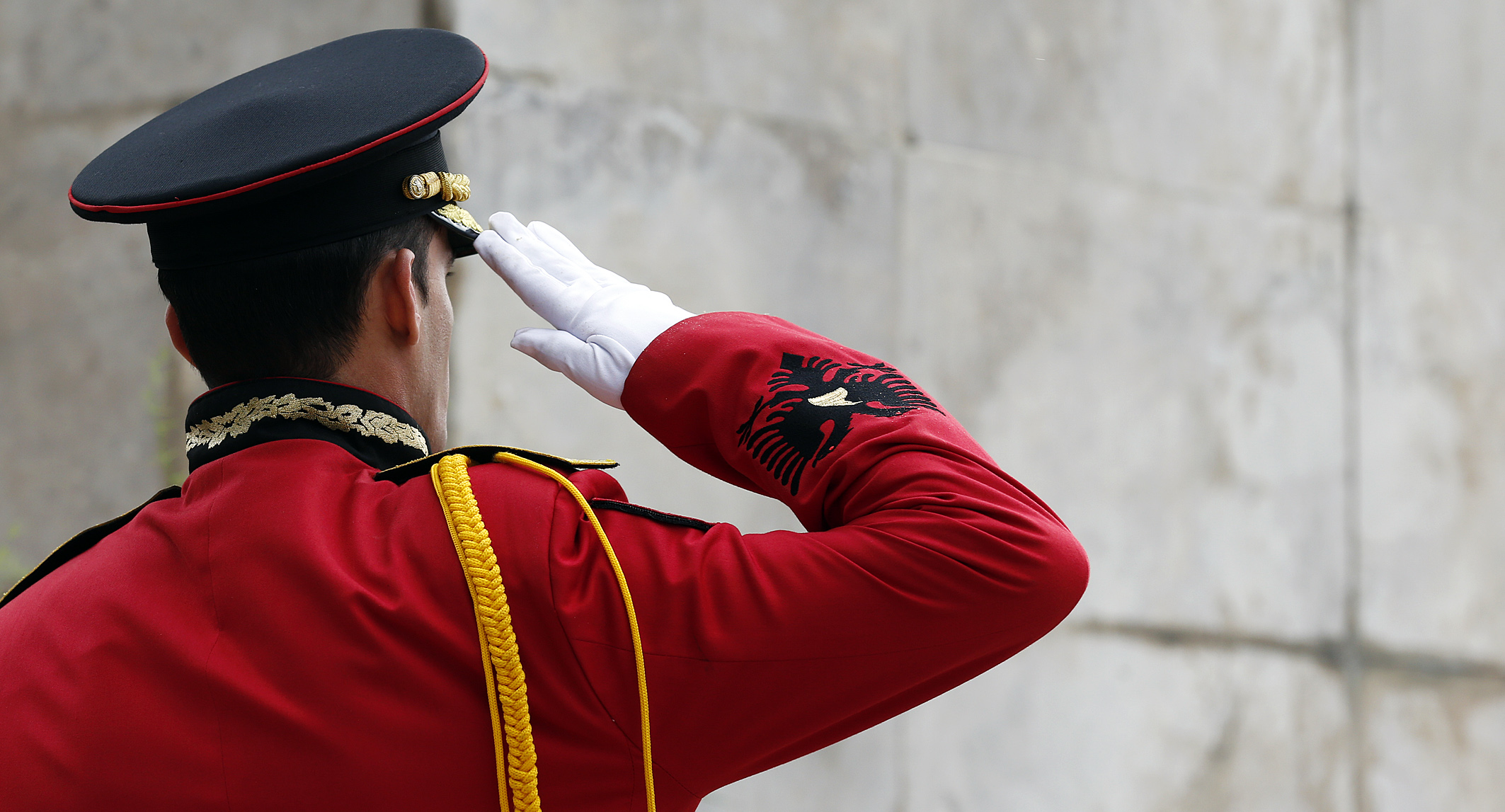
A member of the battalion saluting during the 100th Anniversary of the Independence of Albania in 2012.

The Republican Guard Battalion of Albania is a structure of special status in the Ministry of Internal Affairs, whose mission is to provide physical security to the President; Prime Minister; Chairman of the Parliament and other high state personalities defined in the No. 8869, dated 22 May 2003 "For the Guard of the Republic of Albania". Another of the guard duties it is also the protection of the high importance buildings, such as Parliament; Presidential Office and other buildings defined in the same law.

The guard missions are:

- Guarding important public buildings in Tirana or across the country
- Honor and security services for the highest national personalities and important foreign guests
- Military ceremonies and guards of honour for fallen soldiers
- Support of other law enforcement forces with intervention (i.e. Special Unit) teams

It often cooperates with the Albanian Armed Forces Band in completing these tasks.

== Uniform ==
The current full dress uniform consists of a red tunic and dress pants, as well as a small black Peaked cap with a yellow Coat of Arms of Albania badge at the top. In March 2016, a new uniform was unveiled which includes the officer's ranks and nametag, both of which are sewn on the tunic. According to the online newspaper Shqiptarja.com, the uniform changes reportedly cost 113 million Albanian Lek (about 1.1 million USD).

== Equipment ==
=== Armament ===
Handguns

- Glock 17 9×19mm Parabellum
- TT-30 7.62×25mm Tokarev
- Makarov 9×18mm Makarov
- Beretta M9 9×19mm Parabellum

Sniper Rifle

- Dragunov 7.62×54mmR

Assault Rifles

- AK47 7.62×39mm
- AKMS 5.45×39mm (Albanian Model 56 SOPMOD)

Submachine guns

- HK MP5 9×19mm Parabellum
  - MP5A3
  - MP5-PDW
  - MP5SD
  - MP5K

Knives

- Randall

Other

- Night Vision Goggles
- Gas mask
- Pepper spray
- Flash-bangs

== See also ==
- Royal Albanian Gendarmerie
- 2011 Albanian opposition demonstrations
- Albanian Armed Forces
- Albanian Police
- Ministry of Internal Affairs
