= M59/85 =

Yugoslav steel combat helmet

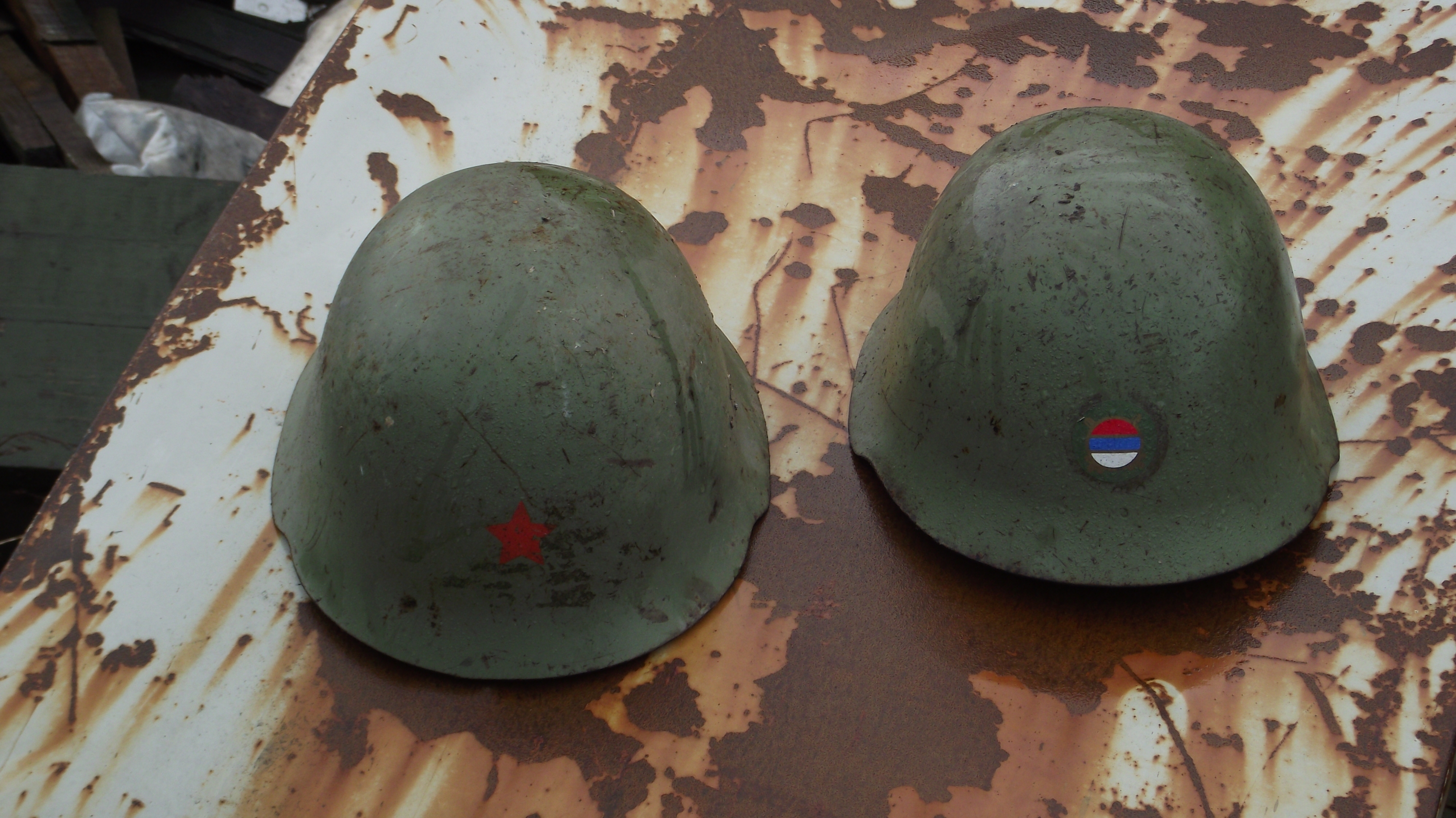
- M59/85 Helmets
- Type: Combat helmet
- Place of origin: Yugoslavia

Service history
- In service: 1958–present
- Used by: See Users
- Wars: Yugoslav Wars; Operation Iraqi Freedom

Specifications
- Mass: 1.5 kg (3.3 lb)

The M59/M85, also known as the NE44 or M44, is a Yugoslav steel combat helmet which was produced between 1958–59 and 1985. Both variants of the helmet were commonly used in the Yugoslav Wars.

== Specifications ==
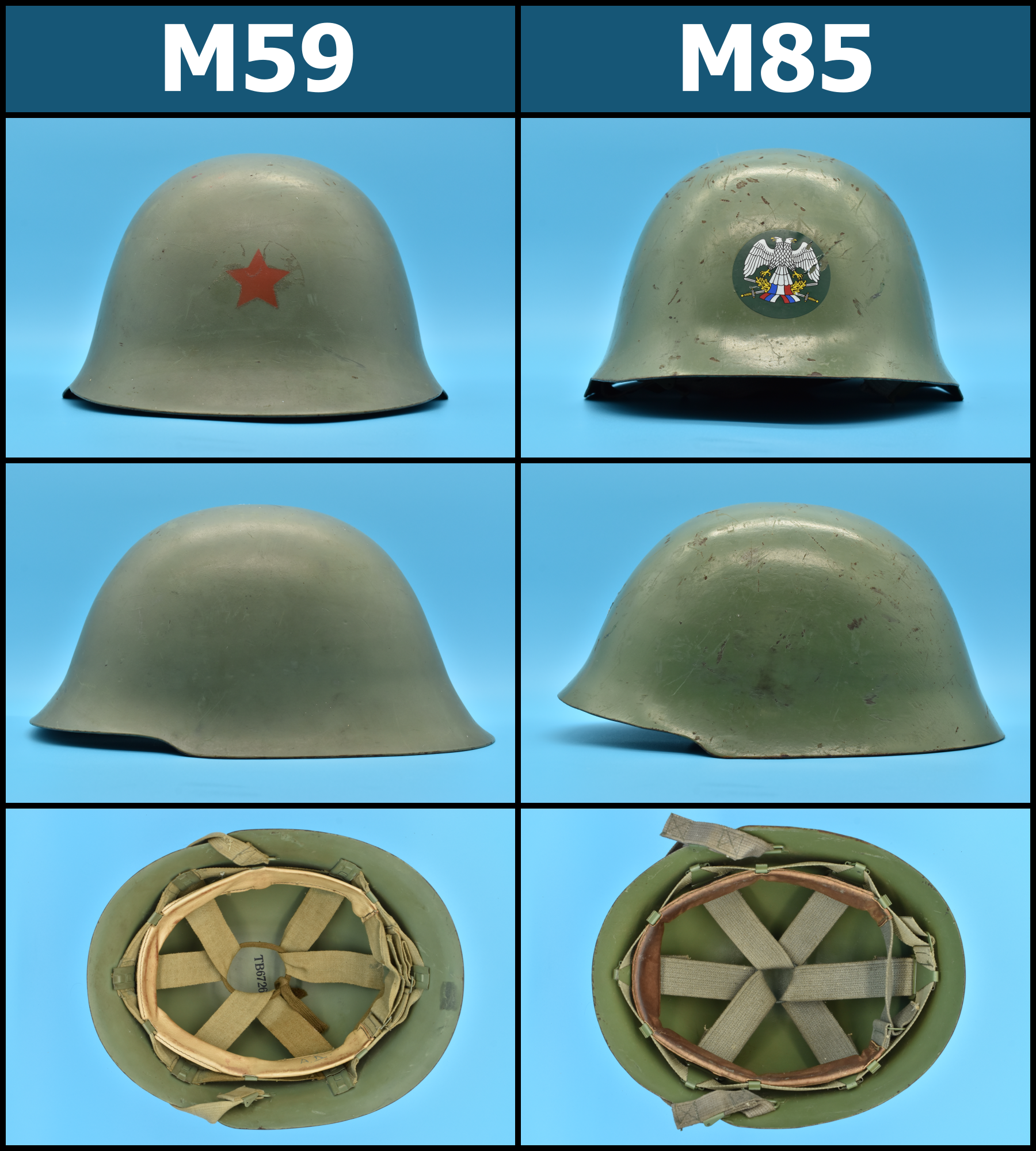
A comparison of the M59 and M85 combat helmets.

=== M59 ===
JNA helmet decal, published in the 23 October 1991 Yugoslav People's Army newsletter. It was featured on helmets worn by the Yugoslav forces at the beginning of the Croatian War. It is the only logo of the JNA without a red star.

The helmet's shape was inspired by the Spanish M34 helmet, sharing very similar profiles, with cut down edges. The liner is a copy of the American M1 helmet's webbing system. The webbing is attached to the helmet with rectangular retention washers. The original models had red stars stenciled on them. Repurposed M59 helmets often incorporated Yugoslavian decals/stickers in order to match the current belligerent.

=== M85 ===
The M85 Is a modernization of the M59 design, trimming down the rear of the helmet's skirt to make it more comfortable to lie prone, and utilizes a slightly modified liner using clips to keep the leather sweatband in place. In 1989, a Kevlar version of the M85 was introduced (designated as M89). The shape of these helmets is identical to the steel M85, though much thicker and with external rivets to mount the lining. They would be issued alongside M59s and M85s until they were able to be mass-produced.

== Users ==
=== Current ===
- Serbia - M59 Used in limited capacity today

=== Former ===
- Serbia and Montenegro
- Croatia - Used the M59 during the Croatian War of Independence
- Republika Srpska - Used the M59 during the Yugoslav Wars
- Macedonia - Used the M59 in the 1990s

== Bibliography ==
- Thomas, Nigel; Mikulan, Krunoslav (2006). The Yugoslav Wars (1): Slovenia & Croatia 1991–95. Bloomsbury Publishing. ISBN 978-1841769639.
- Thomas, Nigel; Mikulan, Krunoslav (2013). The Yugoslav Wars (2): Bosnia, Kosovo and Macedonia 1992–2001. Bloomsbury Publishing. ISBN 978-1472801968.
- Brayley, Martin J. (2008). Tin Hats to Composite Helmets: A Collector's Guide. Crowood Press UK. ISBN 978-1847970244.
