= Naval Academy (Albania) =

Educational institution in Vlorë, Albania

The Naval Academy (Albanian: Akademia e Marinës) was an educational institution based in Vlorë, Albania. It trained officers and non-commissioned officers in the Albanian Navy. Over 1000 cadets graduated from the academy.

== History ==
It was established on 4 September 1961 as the first naval school in the nation, which was then the People's Republic of Albania. It was originally called the School of Navy Officers (Albanian: Shkolla e Lartë e Marinës). It was formed from the first 70 Albanian naval students who returned from the Soviet Union studying at institutions of the Soviet Navy in cities like Baku, Sevastopol, Riga and Leningrad. The building was damaged during the 1997 Albanian civil unrest, only being rebuilt in 1998. It was closed in July 2007 by order of the Ministry of Defense. In 2019, the Albanian government decided to change the ownership of the facility's remnants from the Ministry of Defense to the Municipality of Vlora, in accordance with a decision of February 2017.

== Alumni ==
- Kristaq Gerveni, Representative of Albania in NATO.

== See also ==
- Nikola Vaptsarov Naval Academy
- Italian Naval Academy
- Hellenic Naval Academy
