= International Meeting of Communist and Workers' Parties (disambiguation) =

International Meeting of Communist & Workers' Parties refers to a series of conferences that have taken place since the second half of the 20th century, between the communist parties of Soviet tradition. There are also other two organizations with similar names and purposes.

Below are some of pages referring to these meetings:

- The 1957 International Meeting of Communist and Workers Parties, which was held in Moscow.
- The 1960 International Meeting of Communist and Workers Parties, which was held in Moscow.
- The 1969 International Meeting of Communist and Workers Parties, which was held in Moscow.
- The currently active International Meeting of Communist and Workers' Parties, which gathers since 1998 by the initiative of the Communist Party of Greece.

== Similar names ==
There are other two international organizations
