= Bucharest Conference of Representatives of Communist and Workers Parties =

Meetings of communist parties

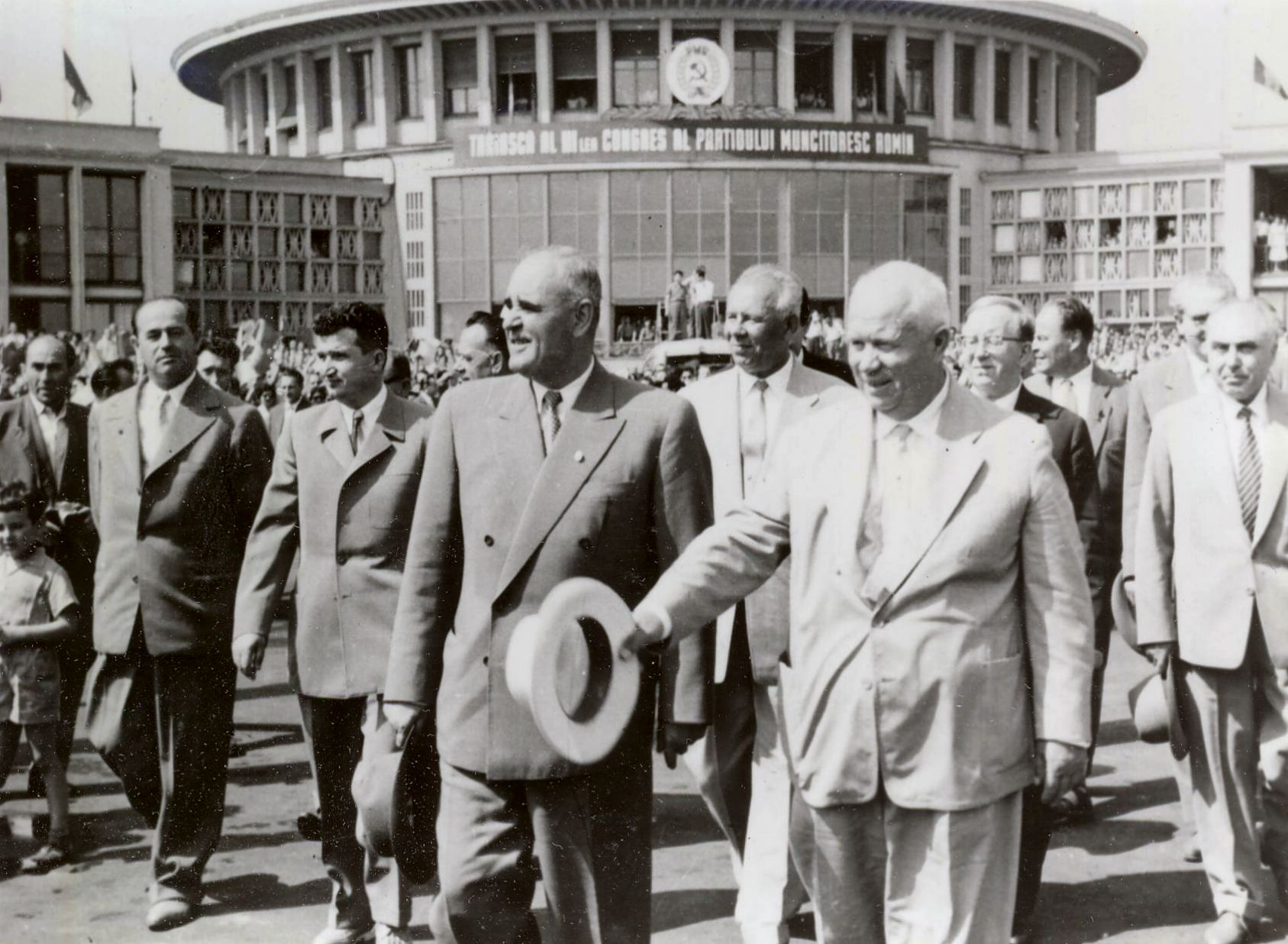
Gheorghiu-Dej and Khrushchev at Bucharest Băneasa Airport in June 1960

The Bucharest Conference of Representatives of Communist and Workers Parties and the Conference of Communist and Workers Parties of the Socialist Countries were two meetings of communist parties held in Bucharest, Romania on June 24–26, 1960. The conferences were held on the side-lines of the Third Congress of the Romanian Workers Party, held June 20–25, 1960.

== Historical background ==
The conference has been described as the first public display of conflict between the Soviet and Chinese communist parties, in the emerging Sino-Soviet split. It was the first clash between the two parties in a gathering of communist parties (whilst conflicts had already played out in meetings of front organizations).

== Purpose of the conference ==
The meeting was held on the initiative of the Communist Party of the Soviet Union On June 2, 1960, the Communist Party of the Soviet Union wrote to the Communist Party of China (CPC), requesting an international meeting to resolve differences within the communist movement. The CPC agreed, but requested to get sufficient time to prepare themselves. The Communist Party of the Soviet Union issued a call on June 7, 1960, for a preliminary conference in Bucharest to 'exchange views' in the wake of the U-2 incident but without taking any decisions. The CPC agreed to the invitation.

== Soviet critique of the Communist Party of China ==
However, at the conference the Soviet party distributed a circular, which argued that the CPC had violated the commitments of the 1957 International Meeting of Communist and Workers Parties. Drafted on June 21, 1960, the Soviet document disclosed for the first time the differences between the two parties. The document represented the first example of a detailed official Soviet critique of the CPC.

== Positions of the delegations ==
The Conference of Representatives of Communist and Workers Parties was attended by parties from 51 countries. The conferences were attended by all the ruling parties of the socialist states in Europe (except the League of Communists of Yugoslavia) and Asia. - i.e. the Romanian Workers Party, the Albanian Party of Labour, the Bulgarian Communist Party, the Hungarian Socialist Workers' Party, the Workers Party of Vietnam, the Socialist Unity Party of Germany, the Communist Party of China, Workers' Party of Korea, the Mongolian People's Revolutionary Party, the Polish United Workers' Party, the Communist Party of the Soviet Union and the Communist Party of Czechoslovakia.

The Soviet delegation was led by Nikita Khrushchev, who argued in favour of the Soviet line of peaceful co-existence in his address to the Romanian party congress. On this occasion, Nikita Khrushchev stated the following: "Comrade Peng Zhen [...] yesterday we drank for friendship, we drank for each other, you said you were for peaceful coexistence and then with the cognac glass you swallowed peaceful coexistence? Comrade Kapo, ask now comrade Peng Zhen, is he for peaceful coexistence or against?" The Chinese delegation was led by Peng Zhen, who countered Khruschev's argument by pointing to the U-2 incident, the subsequent break-up of the Paris Peace Summit and called on the parties present not to trust imperialist forces. The Chinese delegation protested that the conference had not been properly announced on forehand, that the Soviets had ambushed them by changing an informal meeting into a conference by surprise.

The Albanian Party of Labour delegation was the sole Eastern European party not to rally behind the Soviet position at the conference, albeit they didn't outright support the Chinese party line as such. The absence of Albanian leader Enver Hoxha and the Prime Minister Mehmet Shehu was noted, and interpreted as a decline in Soviet-Albanian relations. The Albanian delegation was led by Hysni Kapo, third-ranking politburo member. Other delegation members included Sulejman Baholli, Central Committee member, and Thanas Nano, deputy director of the Agitprop department of the party.

The Workers Party of Vietnam, whose delegation was led by Lê Duẩn, did not take sides between the Soviet and Chinese parties at the conference. The Workers' Party of Korea also took a neutral stand at the conference. All other attending parties unequivocally sided with the Soviet position.

The Socialist Unity Party of Germany delegation was led by Walter Ulbricht. The Bulgarian Communist Party was represented by Todor Zhivkov.

The Communist Party of India was represented by M. Basavapunnaiah and Bhupesh Gupta, who belonged to the leftist faction of the party. The Indian delegation took a neutral stand in the Sino-Soviet dispute (in contrast to the position taken by S.A. Dange, the leader of the CPI right-wing tendency, who fully defended the Soviet party at the Peking conference of the World Federation of Trade Unions held in the same month). The Communist Party USA was represented by Elizabeth Gurley Flynn. The Communist Party of Great Britain was represented by Peter Kerrigan.

Issues debated at the conferences included the Great Leap Forward, the Sino-Indian border tensions and military cooperation.

== Resolution ==
On June 24, 1960, a resolution of the conference was issued, with a language carefully worded to conceal the Sino-Soviet tensions. The resolution called for the holding of an International Meeting of Communist and Workers Parties in Moscow in November 1960, where outstanding differences would be settled.
