= 1957 October Revolution Parade =

1957 parade

The 1957 October Revolution Parade was a parade on Moscow's Red Square dedicated to the ruby jubilee of the Great October Socialist Revolution on 7 November 1957.

It was inspected by the Minister of Defense and Marshal of the Soviet Union Rodion Malinovsky, who also delivered a speech to the troops of the Moscow Military District from the grandstand of Lenin's Mausoleum. Accompanying Malinovsky on the mausoleum was First Secretary of the Communist Party Nikita Khrushchev, Chairman of the Council of Ministers Nikolai Bulganin and the Chairman of the Presidium of the Supreme Soviet Kliment Voroshilov. Among the foreign leaders at the parade was Prime Minister of Czechoslovakia Viliam Široký, Chinese Communist Party chairman Mao Zedong and Vietnamese Workers' Party chairman Ho Chi Minh, who were in Moscow to attend the International Meeting of Communist and Workers Parties. In retaliation for the kidnapping of Hungarian leader Imre Nagy who was executed later, Yugoslav leader Josip Broz Tito boycotted the parade, being the only communist leader who did not attend the parade or the larger celebrations. The parade was led and commanded by the commander of the Moscow Military District General of the Army Kirill Moskalenko.

In the mobile column, vehicles such as the GAZ-69, the BTR-151, the T-54 tanks, and the ZSU-57-2 were seen. It marked the last of the Soviet era flypasts of the Soviet Air Force during military parades, a tradition that was not seen until the 2008 Moscow Victory Day Parade. After the parade, each cadet on parade received a personal thank-you note from Khrushchev, then First Secretary of the Communist Party of the Soviet Union.

== Bibliography ==
- Granville, Johanna (May 1998). "Hungary, 1956: The Yugoslav Connection". Europe-Asia Studies. 50 (3): 493–505.
