= Sino-Soviet split =

Conflict between communist blocs

- Part of the Cold War
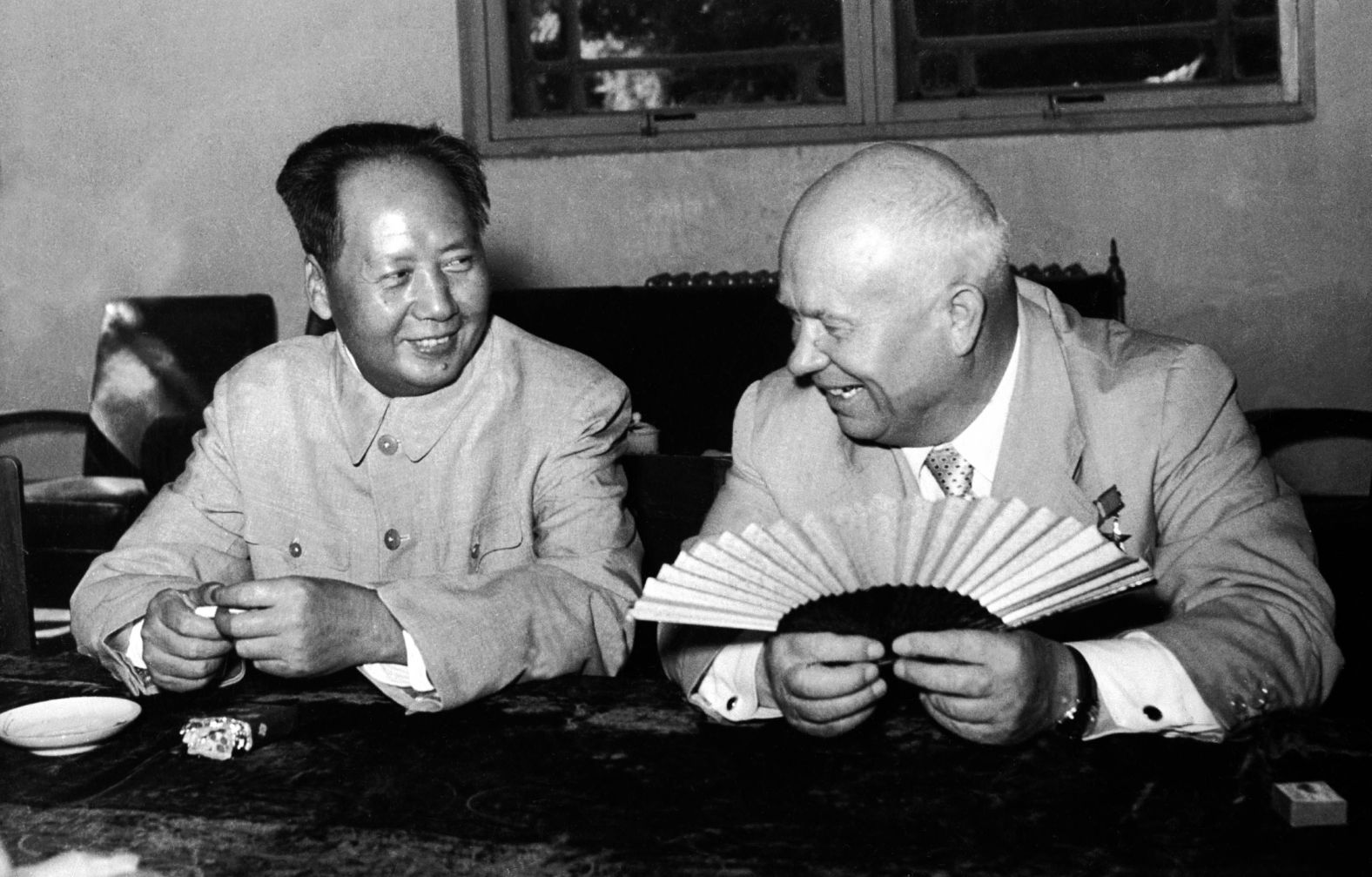
- Mao Zedong (left) and Nikita Khrushchev (right) in Beijing, 1957
- Date: 1961–1989
- Location: China; Soviet Union; Mongolia; Indochina; Afghanistan
- Caused by: De-Stalinization of the Soviet Union, Anti-revisionism and Maoism–Third Worldism
- Methods: Proxy war, propaganda and border skirmishes
- Result: Competition between PRC and USSR for Eastern Bloc allies

Parties
China; Albania (until 1978); Democratic Kampuchea (1975–1989); Somalia (from 1978)	Soviet Union; COMECON (except Romania); Warsaw Pact; Cuba (from 1972); Mongolia (from 1962); Vietnam (from 1978); Afghanistan (from 1978); People's Republic of Kampuchea (1979–1989); Laos (from 1978); India (from 1962); North Korea (from 1962); Somalia (until 1977); Ethiopia (from 1977)

Lead figures
Mao Zedong (until 1976); Hua Guofeng (1976–1978); Deng Xiaoping (1978–1989)	Nikita Khrushchev (until 1964); Leonid Brezhnev (1964–1982); Yuri Andropov (1982–1984); Konstantin Chernenko (1984–1985); Mikhail Gorbachev (1985–1989)

Sino-Soviet split

Chinese name
- Traditional Chinese: 中蘇交惡
- Simplified Chinese: 中苏交恶
Transcriptions
Standard Mandarin
- Hanyu Pinyin: Zhōngsū jiāowù

Russian name
- Russian: Советско–китайский раскол
- Romanization: Sovetsko–kitayskiy raskol

People's Republic of China Soviet Union Countries that shared borders with both: Mongolia was Soviet-aligned while Afghanistan and North Korea remained neutral, with Afghanistan eventually becoming Soviet-aligned in the late 1970s.

The Sino-Soviet split was the gradual worsening of relations between the People’s Republic of China and the Union of Soviet Socialist Republics (USSR) during the Cold War. This was primarily caused by divergences that arose from their different interpretations and practical applications of Marxism–Leninism, as influenced by their respective geopolitics during the Cold War of 1947–1991. In the late 1950s and early 1960s, Sino-Soviet debates about the interpretation of orthodox Marxism became specific disputes about the Soviet Union's policies of national de-Stalinization and international peaceful coexistence with the Western Bloc, which Chinese leader Mao Zedong decried as revisionism. Against that ideological background, China took a belligerent stance towards the Western world, and publicly rejected the Soviet Union's policy of peaceful coexistence between the Western Bloc and Eastern Bloc. In addition, China resented the Soviet Union's growing ties with India due to factors such as the Sino-Indian border dispute, while the Soviet Union feared that Mao was unconcerned about the drastic consequences of nuclear warfare.

In 1956, Soviet leader Nikita Khrushchev denounced Joseph Stalin and Stalinism in the speech "On the Cult of Personality and Its Consequences" and began the de-Stalinization of the USSR. Mao and the Chinese leadership were appalled as the PRC and the USSR progressively diverged in their interpretations and applications of Leninist theory. By 1961, their intractable ideological differences provoked the PRC's formal denunciation of Soviet communism as the work of "revisionist traitors" in the USSR. The PRC also declared the Soviet Union social imperialist. The Soviet Union, in turn, criticized Mao Zedong and China's practices during the subsequent Cultural Revolution. For Eastern Bloc countries, the Sino-Soviet split was a question of who would lead the revolution for world communism, and to whom (China or the USSR) the vanguard parties of the world would turn for political advice, financial aid, and military assistance. In that vein, both countries competed for the leadership of world communism through the revolutionary parties native to the countries in their spheres of influence. The conflict culminated after the Zhenbao Island border incident in 1969, after which the Soviet Union reportedly considered the possibility of launching a large-scale nuclear strike against China, and the Chinese leadership, including Mao, was evacuated from Beijing, before both sides eventually returned to diplomatic negotiations.

In the Western world, the Sino-Soviet split transformed the bi-polar cold war into a tri-polar cold war. The rivalry facilitated Mao's realization of Sino-American rapprochement with the US president Richard Nixon's visit to China in 1972. In the West, the policies of triangular diplomacy and linkage emerged. Like the Tito–Stalin split, the occurrence of the Sino-Soviet split also weakened the concept of monolithic communism, the Western perception that the communist nations were ideologically, and therefore politically, united. However, the USSR and China both continued to cooperate with North Vietnam during the Vietnam War into the 1970s, despite rivalry elsewhere. Historically, the Sino-Soviet split facilitated the Marxist–Leninist Realpolitik with which Mao established the tri-polar geopolitics (PRC–USA–USSR) of the late-period Cold War (1956–1991) to create an anti-Soviet front, which Maoists connected to the Three Worlds Theory. According to Lüthi, there is "no documentary evidence that the Chinese or the Soviets thought about their relationship within a triangular framework during the period."

== Origins ==
=== Reluctant co-belligerents ===
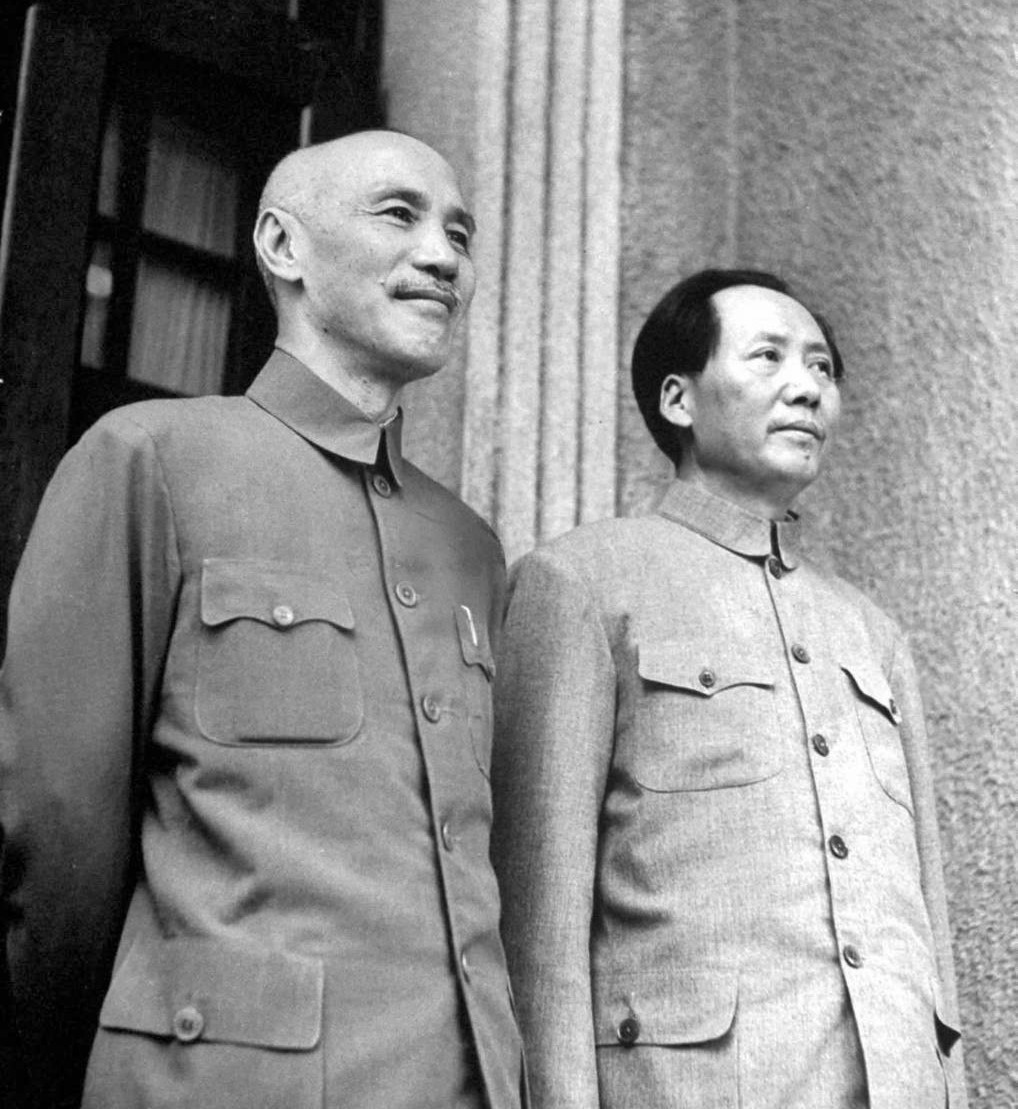
Chiang Kai-shek and Mao Zedong, 1945

During the Second Sino-Japanese War, the Chinese Communist Party (CCP) and the nationalist Kuomintang party (KMT) set aside their civil war to expel the Empire of Japan from the Republic of China. To that end, the Soviet leader, Joseph Stalin, ordered Mao Zedong, leader of the CCP, to co-operate with Chiang Kai-shek, leader of the KMT, in fighting the Japanese. Following the surrender of Japan at the end of World War II, both parties resumed their civil war, which the communists won by 1949.

At World War II's conclusion, Stalin advised Mao not to seize political power at that time, and, instead, to collaborate with Chiang due to the 1945 USSR–KMT Treaty of Friendship and Alliance. Mao obeyed Stalin in communist solidarity. Three months after the Japanese surrender, in November 1945, when Chiang opposed the annexation of Tannu Uriankhai (Mongolia) to the USSR, Stalin broke the treaty requiring the Red Army's withdrawal from Manchuria (giving Mao regional control) and ordered Soviet commander Rodion Malinovsky to give the Chinese communists the Japanese leftover weapons.

In the five-year post-World War II period, the United States partly financed Chiang, his nationalist political party, and the National Revolutionary Army. However, Washington put heavy pressure on Chiang to form a joint government with the communists. US envoy George Marshall spent 13 months in China trying without success to broker peace. In the concluding three-year period of the Chinese Civil War, the CCP defeated and expelled the KMT from mainland China. Consequently, the KMT retreated to Taiwan in December 1949.

=== Chinese communist revolution ===
As a revolutionary theoretician of communism seeking to realize a socialist state in China, Mao developed and adapted the urban ideology of Orthodox Marxism for practical application to the agrarian conditions of pre-industrial China and the Chinese people. Mao's Sinification of Marxism–Leninism, Mao Zedong Thought, established political pragmatism as the first priority for realizing the accelerated modernization of a country and a people, and ideological orthodoxy as the secondary priority because Orthodox Marxism originated for practical application to the socio-economic conditions of industrialized Western Europe in the 19th century.

During the Chinese Civil War in 1947, Mao dispatched American journalist Anna Louise Strong to the West, bearing political documents explaining China's socialist future, and asked that she "show them to Party leaders in the United States and Europe", for their better understanding of the Chinese Communist Revolution, but that it was not "necessary to take them to Moscow."

Mao trusted Strong because of her positive reportage about him, as a theoretician of communism, in the article "The Thought of Mao Tse-Tung", and about the CCP's communist revolution, in the 1948 book Dawn Comes Up Like Thunder Out of China: An Intimate Account of the Liberated Areas in China, which reports that Mao's intellectual achievement was "to change Marxism from a European [form] to an Asiatic form . . . in ways of which neither Marx nor Lenin could dream."

=== Treaty of Sino-Soviet friendship ===
In 1950, Mao and Stalin safeguarded the national interests of China and the Soviet Union with the Treaty of Friendship, Alliance and Mutual Assistance. The treaty improved the two countries' geopolitical relationship on political, military and economic levels. Stalin's largesse to Mao included a loan for $300 million; military aid, should Japan attack the PRC; and the transfer of the Chinese Eastern Railway in Manchuria, Port Arthur and Dalian to Chinese control. In return, the PRC recognized the independence of the Mongolian People's Republic.

Despite the favourable terms, the treaty of socialist friendship included the PRC in the geopolitical hegemony of the USSR, but unlike the governments of the Soviet satellite states in Eastern Europe, the USSR did not control Mao's government. In six years, the great differences between the Soviet and the Chinese interpretations and applications of Marxism–Leninism voided the Sino-Soviet Treaty of Friendship.

In 1954, Soviet first secretary Nikita Khrushchev repaired relations between the USSR and the PRC with trade agreements, a formal acknowledgement of Stalin's economic unfairness to the PRC, fifteen industrial-development projects, and exchanges of technicians (c. 10,000) and political advisors (c. 1,500), whilst Chinese labourers were sent to fill shortages of manual workers in Siberia. Despite this, Mao and Khrushchev disliked each other, both personally and ideologically. However, by 1955, consequent to Khrushchev's having repaired Soviet relations with Mao and the Chinese, 60% of the PRC's exports went to the USSR, by way of the five-year plans of China begun in 1953.

=== Discontents of de-Stalinization ===
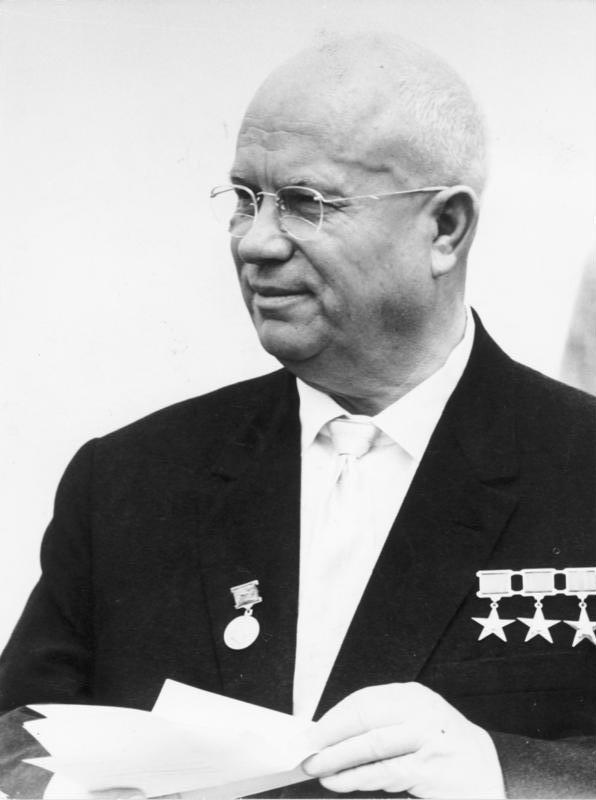
The Sino-Soviet split initially arose in the late 1950s over the ideological divergence between Soviet leader Khrushchev's policies of De-Stalinisation and peaceful coexistence and Mao's affirmation of Stalinism and confrontation with the West. By the late 1970s, the positions were reversed; the New Cold War was beginning with the Soviet Union and the West in confrontation and China having achieved rapprochement with the United States.

In early 1956, Sino-Soviet relations began deteriorating, following Khrushchev's de-Stalinization of the USSR, which he initiated with the speech On the Cult of Personality and its Consequences that criticized Stalin and Stalinism – especially the Great Purge of Soviet society, of the rank-and-file of the Soviet Armed Forces, and of the Communist Party of the Soviet Union (CPSU). In light of de-Stalinization, the CPSU's changed ideological orientation – from Stalin's confrontation of the West to Khrushchev's peaceful coexistence with it – posed problems of ideological credibility and political authority for Mao, who had emulated Stalin's style of leadership and practical application of Marxism–Leninism in the development of socialism with Chinese characteristics and the PRC as a country.

At a meeting with the Soviet Ambassador in late March 1956, Mao spoke of a great deal about Stalin's errors towards China, but very little about the cult of personality, and emphasized instead that Stalin had been "a great Marxist, a good and honest revolutionary" who had made mistakes "not on everything, but [only] on certain issues". These views were soon reflected in the People's Daily editorial entitled "On the Historical Experience of the Dictatorship of the Proletariat" which outlined that it was a "grave misconception...that some people consider Stalin was wrong in everything". It further added that under Stalin's leadership, the Soviet Union had made "glorious achievements" in which he had "an ineffaceable share" while his "mistakes" had been confined to the latter part of his life. Mao's concern was that Khrushchev was "throwing out the communist baby along with the Stalinist bathwater".

The Hungarian Revolution of 1956 against the rule of Moscow was a severe political concern for Mao, because it had required military intervention to suppress, and its occurrence weakened the political legitimacy of the Communist Party to be in government. In response to that discontent among the European members of the Eastern Bloc, the Chinese Communist Party denounced the USSR's de-Stalinization as revisionism, and reaffirmed the Stalinist ideology, policies, and practices of Mao's government as the correct course for achieving socialism in China. In November 1956, at a meeting of the Chinese Central Committee, Mao stated that the "sword of Stalin" had been discarded completely by the Russians and that the "sword of Lenin" had also been discarded to a considerable extent while the Chinese kept both. Mao also questioned whether Khruschev's report in February had implied that "it is no longer necessary for all countries to learn from the October Revolution" and vowed to "stick to studying Marxism-Leninism and learning from the October Revolution". This event, indicating Sino-Soviet divergences of Marxist–Leninist practice and interpretation, began fracturing "monolithic communism" — the Western perception of absolute ideological unity in the Eastern Bloc.

From Mao's perspective, the success of the Soviet foreign policy of peaceful coexistence with the West would geopolitically isolate the PRC; whilst the Hungarian Revolution indicated the possibility of revolt in the PRC, and in China's sphere of influence. To thwart such discontent, Mao launched in 1956 the Hundred Flowers Campaign of political liberalization – the freedom of speech to criticize government, the bureaucracy, and the CCP publicly. However, the campaign proved too successful when blunt criticism of Mao was voiced. Consequent to the relative freedoms of the de-Stalinized USSR, Mao retained the Stalinist model of Marxist–Leninist economy, government, and society.

Ideological differences between Mao and Khrushchev compounded the insecurity of the new communist leader in China. Following the Chinese civil war, Mao was especially sensitive to ideological shifts that might undermine the CCP. In an era saturated by this form of ideological instability, Khrushchev's anti-Stalinism was particularly impactful to Mao. Mao saw himself as a descendent in a long Marxist–Leninist lineage of which Stalin was the most recent figurehead. Chinese leaders began to associate Stalin's successor with anti-party elements within China. Khrushchev was pinned as a revisionist. Popular sentiment within China regarded Khrushchev as a representative of the upper-class, and Chinese Marxist-Leninists viewed the leader as a blight on the communist project. While the two nations had significant ideological similarities, domestic instability drove a wedge between the nations as they began to adopt different visions of communism following the death of Stalin in 1953.

=== Chinese radicalization and distrust ===
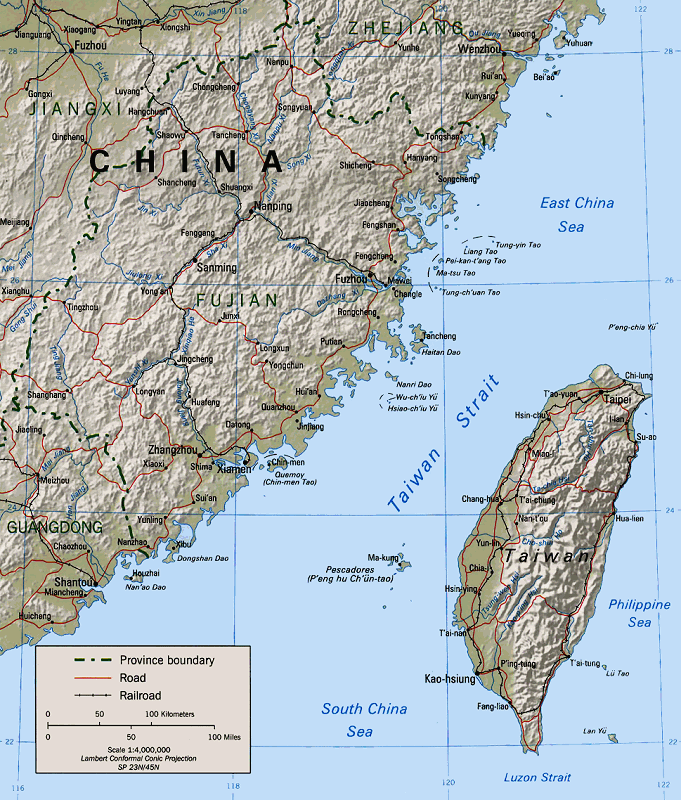
The strait of Taiwan

In the first half of 1958, Chinese domestic politics developed an anti-Soviet tone from the ideological disagreement over de-Stalinization and the radicalization that preceded the Great Leap Forward. It coincided with greater Chinese sensitivity over matters of sovereignty and control over foreign policy - particularly where Taiwan was concerned. The result was a growing Chinese reluctance to cooperate with the Soviet Union. The deterioration of the relationship manifested throughout the year.

In April, the Soviets proposed the construction of a joint radio transmitter. China rejected it after counter-proposing that the transmitter be Chinese owned and that Soviet usage be limited to wartime. A similar Soviet proposal in July was also rejected. In June, China requested Soviet assistance to develop nuclear attack submarines. The following month, the Soviets proposed the construction of a joint strategic submarine fleet, but the proposal as delivered failed to mention the type of submarine. The proposal was strongly rejected by Mao under the belief that the Soviet wanted to control China's coast and submarines. Khrushchev secretly visited Beijing in early August in an unsuccessful attempt to salvage the proposal; Mao was in an ideological furor and would not accept. The meeting ended with an agreement to construct the previously rejected radio station with Soviet loans. To Khrushchev, Mao's refusal to permit closer military cooperation made Mao an ungrateful and erratic partner, while Mao saw Khrushchev as weak for having prioritized improved relations with the United States that betrayed the communist movement.

Further damage was caused by the Second Taiwan Strait Crisis toward the end of August. China did not notify or consult the Soviet Union before initiating the conflict, contradicting China's previous desire to share information for foreign affairs and violating - at least the spirit - the Sino-Soviet friendship treaty. This may have been partially in response to what the Chinese viewed as the timid Soviet response to the West in the 1958 Lebanon crisis and 1958 Iraqi coup d'état. The Soviets opted to publicly support China at the end of August, but became concerned when the US replied with veiled threats of nuclear war in early September and mixed-messaging from the Chinese. China stated that its goal was the resumption of ambassadorial talks that had started after the First Taiwan Strait Crisis while simultaneously framing the crisis as the start of a nuclear war with the capitalist bloc.

Chinese nuclear brinkmanship was a threat to peaceful coexistence. The crisis and ongoing nuclear disarmament talks with the US helped to convince the Soviets to renege on its 1957 commitment to deliver a model nuclear bomb to China. By this time, the Soviets had already helped create the foundations of China's nuclear weapons program.

=== Mao's nuclear-war remarks and two Chinas ===
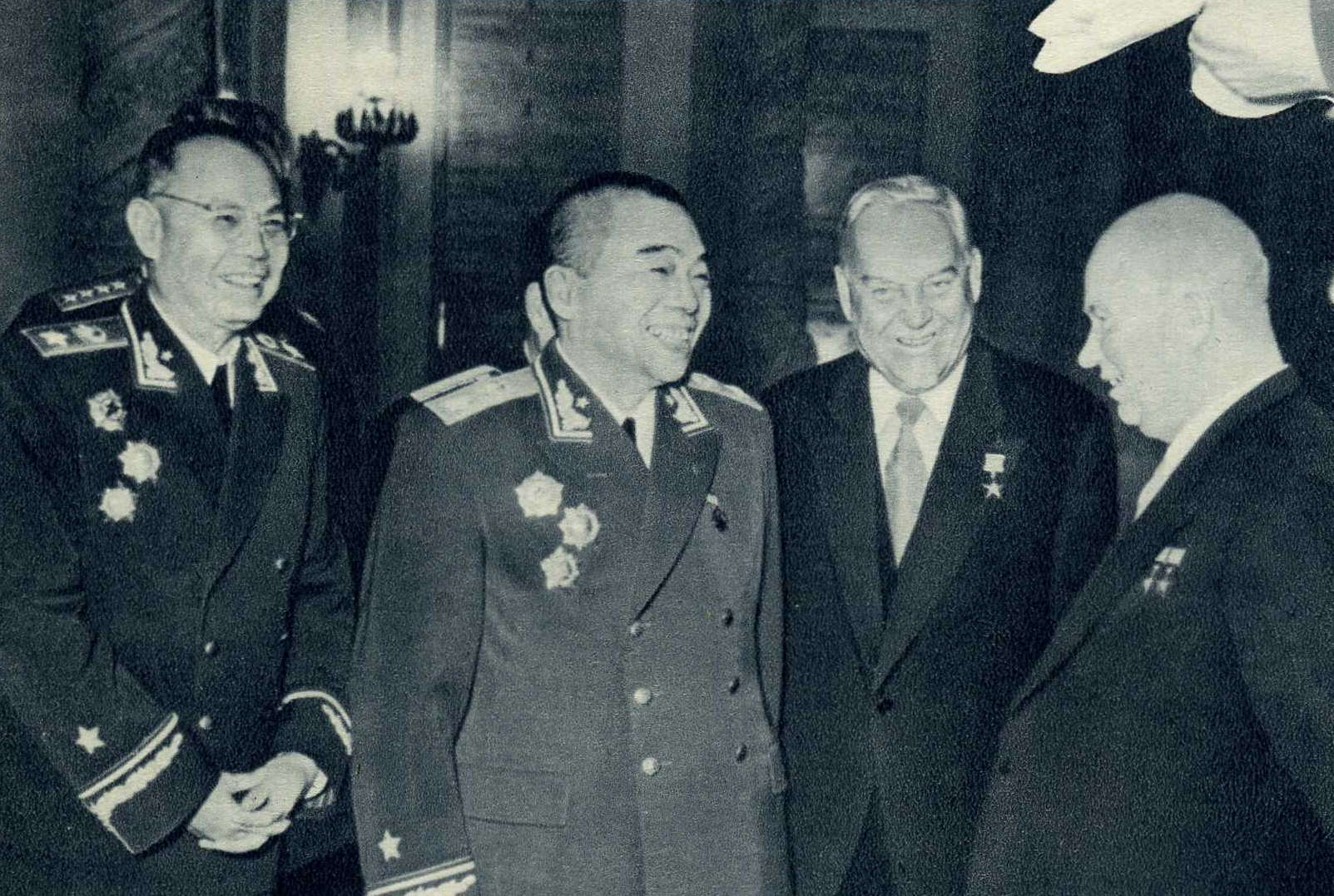
A meeting of some Chinese and Soviet leaders in 1958. From left to right: Ye Jianying, Peng Dehuai, Nikolai Bulganin, and Nikita Khrushchev.

Throughout the 1950s, Khrushchev maintained positive Sino-Soviet relations with foreign aid, especially nuclear technology for the Chinese atomic bomb project, Project 596. However, political tensions persisted because the economic benefits of the USSR's peaceful-coexistence policy voided the belligerent PRC's geopolitical credibility among the nations under Chinese hegemony, especially after a failed PRC–US rapprochement. In the Chinese sphere of influence, that Sino-American diplomatic failure and the presence of US nuclear weapons in Taiwan justified Mao's confrontational foreign policies with Taiwan (Republic of China).

According to various sources including official CCP publications, at the 1957 International Meeting of Communist and Workers Parties in Moscow, Mao Zedong made some controversial remarks on nuclear wars, saying that "I'm not afraid of nuclear war. There are 2.7 billion people in the world; it doesn't matter if some are killed. China has a population of 600 million; even if half of them are killed, there are still 300 million people left." His remarks shocked many people, and according to the recollection of Khrushchev, "the audience was dead silent". A number of Communist leaders, including Antonín Novotný, Władysław Gomułka and Shmuel Mikunis, expressed concerns after the meeting, eventually aligning themselves with the Soviet due to the combativeness of Mao's policies. Novotný, then First Secretary of the Communist Party of Czechoslovakia, complained that "Mao Zedong says he is prepared to lose 300 million people out of a population of 600 million. What about us? We have only twelve million people in Czechoslovakia." Mao had reportedly said similar things in 1956 when meeting with a delegation of journalists from Yugoslavia, and in 1958 at the second meeting of the 8th National Congress of the Chinese Communist Party. In 1963, the Chinese government issued a statement, calling the quote of "300 million people" was a slander from the Soviet Union.

In late 1958, the CCP revived Mao's guerrilla-period cult of personality to portray Chairman Mao as the charismatic, visionary leader solely qualified to control the policy, administration, and popular mobilization required to realize the Great Leap Forward to industrialize China. Moreover, to the Eastern Bloc, Mao portrayed the PRC's warfare with Taiwan and the accelerated modernization of the Great Leap Forward as Stalinist examples of Marxism–Leninism adapted to Chinese conditions. These circumstances allowed ideological Sino-Soviet competition, and Mao publicly criticized Khrushchev's economic and foreign policies as deviations from Marxism–Leninism.

== Onset of the disputes ==
To Mao, the events of the 1958–1959 period indicated that Khrushchev was politically untrustworthy as an orthodox Marxist. In 1959, First Secretary Khrushchev met with US President Dwight Eisenhower to decrease US-Soviet geopolitical tensions. To that end, the USSR: (i) reneged an agreement for technical aid to develop Project 596, and (ii) sided with India in the Sino-Indian War. Each US-Soviet collaboration offended Mao and he perceived Khrushchev as an opportunist who had become too tolerant of the West. The CCP said that the CPSU concentrated too much on "Soviet–US co-operation for the domination of the world", with geopolitical actions that contradicted Marxism–Leninism.

The final face-to-face meeting between Mao and Khruschev took place on 2 October 1959, when Khrushchev visited Beijing to mark the 10th anniversary of the proclamation of the People's Republic of China. By this point relations had deteriorated to the level where the Chinese were going out of their way to humiliate the Soviet leader - for example, there was no honour guard to greet him, no Chinese leader gave a speech, and when Khrushchev insisted on giving a speech of his own, no microphone was provided. The speech in question would turn out to contain praise of the US President Eisenhower, whom Khrushchev had recently met, obviously an intentional insult to Communist China. The leaders of the two Socialist states would not meet again for the next 30 years.

=== Khrushchev's criticism of Albania at the 22nd CPSU Congress ===
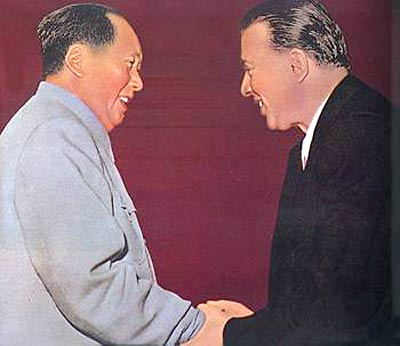
Solidarity: China's Mao Zedong and Albania's Enver Hoxha were united in both their stance against Revisionism as well as ideologically upholding Stalin.

In June 1960, at the zenith of de-Stalinization, the USSR denounced the People's Republic of Albania as a politically backward country for retaining Stalinism as government and model of socialism. In turn, Bao Sansan said that the CCP's message to the cadres in China was:

"When Khrushchev stopped Russian aid to Albania, Hoxha said to his people: 'Even if we have to eat the roots of grass to live, we won't take anything from Russia.' China is not guilty of chauvinism, and immediately sent food to our brother country."

During his opening speech at the CPSU's 22nd Party Congress on 17 October 1961 in Moscow, Khrushchev once again criticized Albania as a politically backward state and the Albanian Party of Labour as well as its leadership, including Enver Hoxha, for refusing to support reforms against Stalin's legacy, in addition to their criticism of rapprochement with Yugoslavia, leading to the Soviet–Albanian split. In response to this rebuke, on 19 October the delegation representing China at the Party Congress led by Chinese Premier Zhou Enlai sharply criticised Moscow's stance towards Tirana:

"We hold that should a dispute or difference unfortunately arise between fraternal parties or fraternal countries, it should be resolved patiently in the spirit of proletarian internationalism and according to the principles of equality and of unanimity through consultation. Public, one-sided censure of any fraternal party does not help unity and is not helpful in resolving problems. To bring a dispute between fraternal parties or fraternal countries into the open in the face of the enemy cannot be regarded as a serious Marxist–Leninist attitude."

Subsequently, on 21 October, Zhou visited the Lenin Mausoleum (then still entombing Stalin's body), laying two wreaths at the base of the site, one of which read "Dedicated to the great Marxist, Comrade Stalin". On 23 October, the Chinese delegation left Moscow for Beijing early, before the Congress' conclusion; within days, Khrushchev had Stalin's body removed from the mausoleum.

=== Soviet Opposition to the People's Communes ===
The roc wings fanwise,
Soaring ninety thousand li
And rousing a raging cyclone.
The blue sky on his back, he looks down
To survey Man's world with its towns and cities.
Gunfire licks the heavens,
Shells pit the earth.
A sparrow in his bush is scared stiff..
"This is one hell of a mess!
O I want to flit and fly away."
"Where, may I ask?"
The sparrow replies,
"To a jewelled palace in elfland's hills.
Don't you know a triple pact was signed
Under the bright autumn moon two years ago?
There'll be plenty to eat,
Potatoes piping hot,
Beef-filled goulash."
"Stop your windy nonsense!
Look, the world is being turned upside down."

— Mao Zedong, "Two Birds: a Dialogue -- to the tune of Nien Nu Chiao", Autumn 1965

In 1953, guided by Soviet economists, the PRC applied the USSR's model of command economy, which gave first priority to the development of heavy industry, and second priority to the production of consumer goods. Later, ignoring the guidance of technical advisors, Mao launched the Great Leap Forward to transform agrarian China into an industrialized country with disastrous results for people and land. Mao's unrealistic goals for agricultural production went unfulfilled because of poor planning and realization, which aggravated rural starvation and increased the number of deaths caused by the Great Chinese Famine, which resulted from three years of drought and poor weather. An estimated 30 million Chinese people starved to death, more than any other famine in recorded history. Mao and his government largely downplayed the deaths.

In November 1958, Khrushchev met with Polish leader Władysław Gomułka, with official Polish records documenting Khrushchev's strong aversion to the People's Communes. Subsequently, Khrushchev drew parallels between China's People's Communes and the Soviet communes of the 1920s, deeming them erroneous practices. In December 1958, it is alleged that Khrushchev once again criticised China's people's communes during a meeting with US Senator Hubert Humphrey. Khrushchev remarked, "They are old-fashioned, they are reactionary. We tried that right after the revolution. It just doesn't work." In January 1959, during his visit to the United States, Anastas Mikoyan reiterated that "the Soviet Union had abandoned the kind of pure communes recently established in Communist China, because it was found that they would not function without an incentive system." In July 1959, Khrushchev publicly criticised the establishment of communes during a mass rally in Poland. Polish newspapers omitted his criticism of the communes in their reports, whereas Pravda published the full text. However, Khrushchev's speech coincided with the Lushan Conference, and Mao Zedong was deeply displeased by Khrushchev's criticisms.

In the Romanian capital of Bucharest, at the International Meeting of Communist and Workers Parties (November 1960), Mao and Khrushchev respectively attacked the Soviet and the Chinese interpretations of Marxism-Leninism as the wrong road to world socialism in the USSR and in China. Mao said that Khrushchev's emphases on consumer goods and material plenty would make the Soviets ideologically soft and un-revolutionary, to which Khrushchev replied: "If we could promise the people nothing, except revolution, they would scratch their heads and say: 'Isn't it better to have good goulash?'"

=== Monolithic communism fractured ===
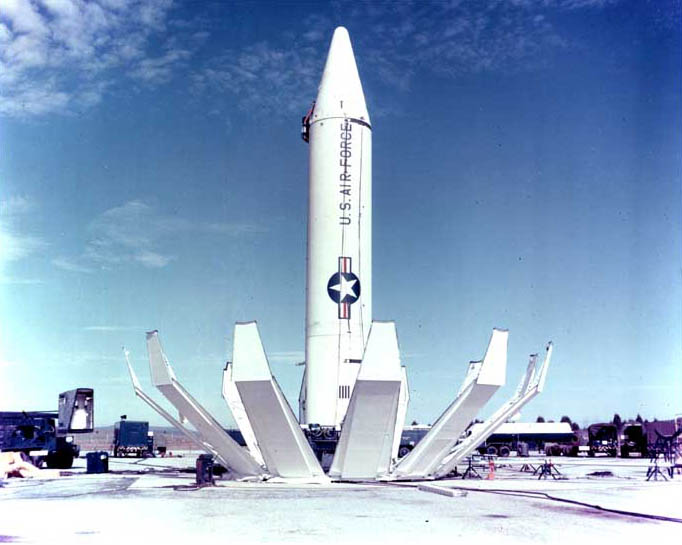
In late 1962, the Cuban Missile Crisis concluded when the US and the USSR respectively agreed to remove intermediate-range PGM-19 Jupiter nuclear missiles from Italy and Turkey, and to remove intermediate-range R-12 Dvina and R-14 Chusovaya nuclear missiles from Cuba. In the context of the Sino-Soviet split, Mao said that the USSR's military stand-down was Khrushchev's betrayal of Marxist–Leninist geopolitics.

In 1960, Mao expected Khrushchev to deal aggressively with US President Dwight D. Eisenhower by holding him to account for the USSR having shot down a U-2 spy plane, the CIA's photographing of military bases in the USSR; aerial espionage that the US said had been discontinued. In Paris, at the Four Powers Summit meeting, Khrushchev demanded and failed to receive Eisenhower's apology for the CIA's continued aerial espionage of the USSR. In China, Mao and the CCP interpreted Eisenhower's refusal to apologize as disrespectful of the national sovereignty of socialist countries, and held political rallies aggressively demanding Khrushchev's military confrontation with US aggressors; without such decisive action, Khrushchev lost face with the PRC.

In the 1960s, public displays of acrimonious quarrels about Marxist–Leninist doctrine characterized relations between hardline Stalinist Chinese and post-Stalinist Soviet Communists. At the Romanian Communist Party Congress in June 1960, the CCP's senior officer Peng Zhen quarrelled with Khrushchev, after the latter had insulted Mao as being an ultra-Leftist, an ultra-dogmatist, a Chinese nationalist, a geopolitical adventurist, and an ideological deviationist from Marxism–Leninism, who like Stalin had become "oblivious of any interests but his own, spinning theories detached from the realities of the modern world." In turn, Peng insulted Khrushchev as a revisionist whose régime showed him to be a "patriarchal, arbitrary, and tyrannical" ruler in order to impose non-Marxist views. In the event, Khrushchev denounced the PRC with 80 pages of criticism to the congress of the PRC.

In response to the insults, Khrushchev withdrew 1,400 Soviet technicians from the PRC, which cancelled some 200 joint scientific projects. According to Chinese records, the Soviet Union suddenly withdrew 1390 technicians and ended 600 contracts with PRC in 1960. Popular sentiment within China changed as Khrushchev's policies changed. Stalin had accepted that the USSR would carry much of the economic burden of the Korean War, but, when Khrushchev came to power, he created a repayment plan under which the PRC would reimburse the Soviet Union within an eight-year period. However, China was experiencing significant food shortages at this time, and, when grain shipments were routed to the Soviet Union instead of feeding the Chinese public, faith in the Soviets plummeted. Mao justified his belief that Khrushchev had somehow caused China's great economic failures and the famines that occurred in the period of the Great Leap Forward. Nonetheless, the PRC and the USSR remained pragmatic allies, which allowed Mao to alleviate famine in China and to resolve Sino-Indian border disputes. To Mao, Khrushchev had lost political authority and ideological credibility, because his US-Soviet détente had resulted in successful military (aerial) espionage against the USSR and public confrontation with an unapologetic capitalist enemy. Khrushchev's miscalculation of person and circumstance voided US-Soviet diplomacy at the Four Powers Summit in Paris.

In 1960, Ho Chi Minh, uniquely among Marxist-Leninist world leaders, attempted to mediate the growing Sino-Soviet tensions, staking his own personal reputation by doing so. On 14 August 1960, Ho attended a meeting in Sochi with Khrushchev, Władysław Gomułka, Yumjaagiin Tsedenbal, and Gheorghe Gheorghiu-Dej, the purpose of which was to discuss the growing tensions with China. Khrushchev expressed reservations about Mao's growing nationalism, which he perceived as similar to the racial, pan-Asian nationalist propaganda of Imperial Japan. Later, when Ho met with Deng Xiaoping, Deng used the information he had received from Ho to denounce the Soviets and accuse them of spreading Yellow Peril. Although Ho was able to foster dialogue between the two states, the limited influence of North Vietnam within the Marxist-Leninist world resulted in Ho failing to prevent the split.

In late 1961, at the 22nd Congress of the CPSU, the PRC and the USSR revisited their doctrinal disputes about the orthodox interpretation and application of Marxism–Leninism. In December 1961, the USSR broke diplomatic relations with Albania, which escalated the Sino-Soviet disputes from the political-party level to the national-government level.

During the Yi–Ta incident from March to May 1962, over 60,000 Chinese citizens, mostly ethnic Kazakhs driven in part by uncertainty over the Sino-Soviet split, crossed the border from Xinjiang into Soviet Kazakhstan.

In late 1962, the PRC broke relations with the USSR because Khrushchev did not go to war with the US over the Cuban Missile Crisis. Regarding that Soviet loss-of-face, Mao said that "Khrushchev has moved from adventurism to capitulationism" with a negotiated, bilateral, military stand-down. Khrushchev replied that Mao's belligerent foreign policies would lead to an East–West nuclear war. For the Western powers, the averted atomic war threatened by the Cuban Missile Crisis made nuclear disarmament their political priority. To that end, the US, the UK, and the USSR agreed to the Partial Nuclear Test Ban Treaty in 1963, which formally forbade nuclear-detonation tests in the Earth's atmosphere, in outer space, and under water – yet did allow the underground testing and detonation of atomic bombs. In that time, the PRC's nuclear-weapons program, Project 596, was nascent, and Mao perceived the test-ban treaty as the nuclear powers' attempt to thwart the PRC's becoming a nuclear superpower.

Khrushchev was also more supportive of India in the Sino-Indian War of 1962, to which Mao expressed disgust over Khrushchev's betrayal of socialist solidarity and his ill-judged mixture of adventurism and capitulation with which he had affronted the Americans.

Between 6 and 20 July 1963, a series of Soviet-Chinese negotiations were held in Moscow. However, both sides maintained their own ideological views and, therefore, negotiations failed.

In March 1964, the Romanian Workers' Party publicly announced the intention of the Bucharest authorities to mediate the Sino-Soviet conflict. In reality, however, the Romanian mediation approach represented only a pretext for forging a Sino-Romanian rapprochement, without arousing the Soviets' suspicions. Romania was neutral in the Sino-Soviet split. Its neutrality along with being the small communist country with the most influence in global affairs enabled Romania to be recognized by the world as the "third force" of the communist world. Romania's independence - achieved in the early 1960s through its freeing from its Soviet satellite status - was tolerated by Moscow because Romania was surrounded by socialist states and because its ruling party was not going to abandon communism. North Korea under Kim Il Sung also remained neutral because of its strategic status after the Korean War, although it later moved more decisively towards the USSR after Deng Xiaoping's reform and opening up.

The Italian Communist Party (PCI), one of the largest and most politically influential communist parties in Western Europe, adopted an ambivalent stance towards Mao's split from the USSR. Although the PCI chastised Mao for breaking the previous global unity of socialist states and criticised the Cultural Revolution brought about by him, it simultaneously applauded and heaped praise on him for the People's Republic of China's enormous assistance to North Vietnam in its war against South Vietnam and the United States.

As a Marxist–Leninist, Mao was much angered that Khrushchev did not go to war with the US over their failed Bay of Pigs Invasion and the United States embargo against Cuba of continual economic and agricultural sabotage. For the Eastern Bloc, Mao addressed those Sino-Soviet matters in "Nine Letters" critical of Khrushchev and his leadership of the USSR. Moreover, the break with the USSR allowed Mao to reorient the development of the PRC with formal relations (diplomatic, economic, political) with the countries of Asia, Africa, and Latin America.

=== Formal and informal statements ===
In the 1960s, the Sino-Soviet split allowed only written communications between the PRC and the USSR, in which each country supported their geopolitical actions with formal statements of Marxist–Leninist ideology as the true road to world communism, which is the general line of the party. In June 1963, the PRC published a collection of documents titled The Chinese Communist Party's Proposal Concerning the General Line of the International Communist Movement in which for the first time, attacked the USSR by name, to which the USSR replied with the Open Letter of the Communist Party of the Soviet Union; each ideological stance perpetuated the Sino-Soviet split. In 1964, Mao said that, in light of the Chinese and Soviet differences about the interpretation and practical application of Orthodox Marxism, a counter-revolution had occurred and re-established capitalism in the USSR; consequently, following Soviet suit, the Warsaw Pact countries broke relations with the PRC.

In late 1964, after Nikita Khrushchev had been deposed, Chinese Premier Zhou Enlai met with the new Soviet leaders, First Secretary Leonid Brezhnev and Premier Alexei Kosygin, but their ideological differences proved a diplomatic impasse to renewed economic relations. The Soviet defense minister's statement damaged the prospects of improved Sino-Soviet relations. Historian Daniel Leese noted that improvement of the relations "that had seemed possible after Khrushchev's fall evaporated after the Soviet minister of defense, Rodion Malinovsky... approached Chinese Marshal He Long, member of the Chinese delegation to Moscow, and asked when China would finally get rid of Mao like the CPSU had disposed of Khrushchev." Back in China, Zhou reported to Mao that Brezhnev's Soviet government retained the policy of peaceful coexistence which Mao had denounced as "Khrushchevism without Khrushchev"; despite the change of leadership, the Sino-Soviet split remained open. At the Glassboro Summit Conference, between Kosygin and US President Lyndon B. Johnson, the PRC accused the USSR of betraying the peoples of the Eastern bloc countries. The official interpretation, by Radio Peking, reported that US and Soviet politicians discussed "a great conspiracy, on a worldwide basis ... criminally selling the rights of the revolution of [the] Vietnam people, [of the] Arabs, as well as [those of] Asian, African, and Latin-American peoples, to US imperialists".

== Conflict ==
=== Cultural Revolution ===
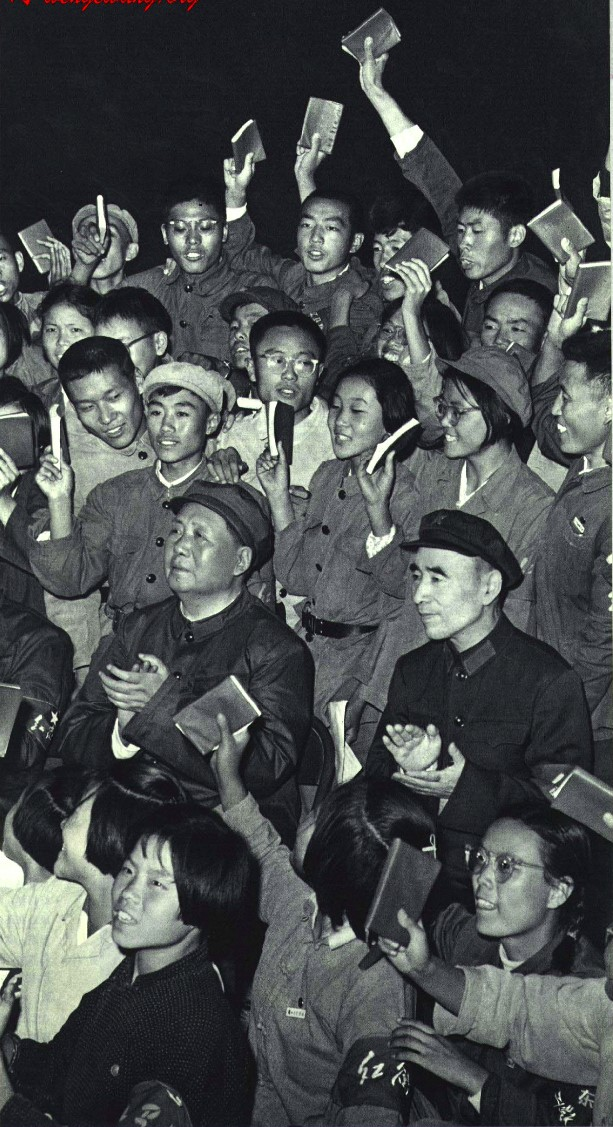
A public appearance of Chairman Mao and Vice Chairman Lin Biao among Red Guards, in Beijing, during the Cultural Revolution (November 1966)

To regain political supremacy in the PRC, Mao launched the Cultural Revolution in 1966 to counter the Soviet-style bureaucracies (personal-power-centres) that had become established in education, agriculture, and industrial management. Abiding Mao's proclamations for universal ideological orthodoxy, schools and universities closed throughout China when students organized themselves into politically radical Red Guards. Lacking a leader, a political purpose, and a social function, the ideologically discrete units of Red Guards soon degenerated into political factions, each of whom claimed to be more Maoist than the other factions.

In establishing the ideological orthodoxy presented in the Little Red Book (Quotations from Chairman Mao Tse-tung), the political violence of the Red Guards provoked civil war in parts of China, known as the violent struggle, which Mao suppressed with the People's Liberation Army (PLA), who imprisoned the fractious Red Guards. Moreover, when Red Guard factionalism occurred within the PLA – Mao's base of political power – he dissolved the Red Guards, and then reconstituted the CCP with the new generation of Maoists who had endured and survived the Cultural Revolution that purged the "anti-communist" old generation from the party and from China.

As social engineering, the Cultural Revolution reasserted the political primacy of Maoism, but also stressed, strained, and broke the PRC's relations with the USSR and the West. The Soviet Union ridiculed and criticized Mao's Cultural Revolution fiercely, and some publications in USSR and Eastern Bloc also compared Mao meeting Red Guards on Tiananmen to Adolf Hitler giving speeches to his supporters. Geopolitically, despite their querulous "Maoism vs. Marxism–Leninism" disputes about interpretations and practical applications of Marxism–Leninism, both the USSR and the PRC advised, aided, and supplied North Vietnam during the Vietnam War, which Mao had defined as a peasant revolution against foreign imperialism. In socialist solidarity, the PRC allowed safe passage for the Soviet Union's matériel to North Vietnam to prosecute the war against the US-sponsored Republic of Vietnam, until 1968, after the Chinese withdrawal.

=== Siege of the Soviet embassy in Beijing ===
In August 1966 the Soviet Ministry of Foreign Affairs sent the first of several notes to the Chinese embassy in Moscow protesting aggressive Chinese behavior near the Soviet embassy in Beijing. On 25 January 1967, the Chinese visiting the Lenin Mausoleum on Moscow Red Square jumped over a barrier and began chanting Mao quotes. Then one Chinese allegedly hit a Soviet woman, and a scuffle took place. After this incident new outrages against the Soviet embassy in Beijing began. The threat of physical danger caused the Soviets to evacuate women and children from their embassy in Beijing in February 1967. Even as the women and children were boarding the plane, they were harassed by hostile Red Guards.

=== Border conflict ===
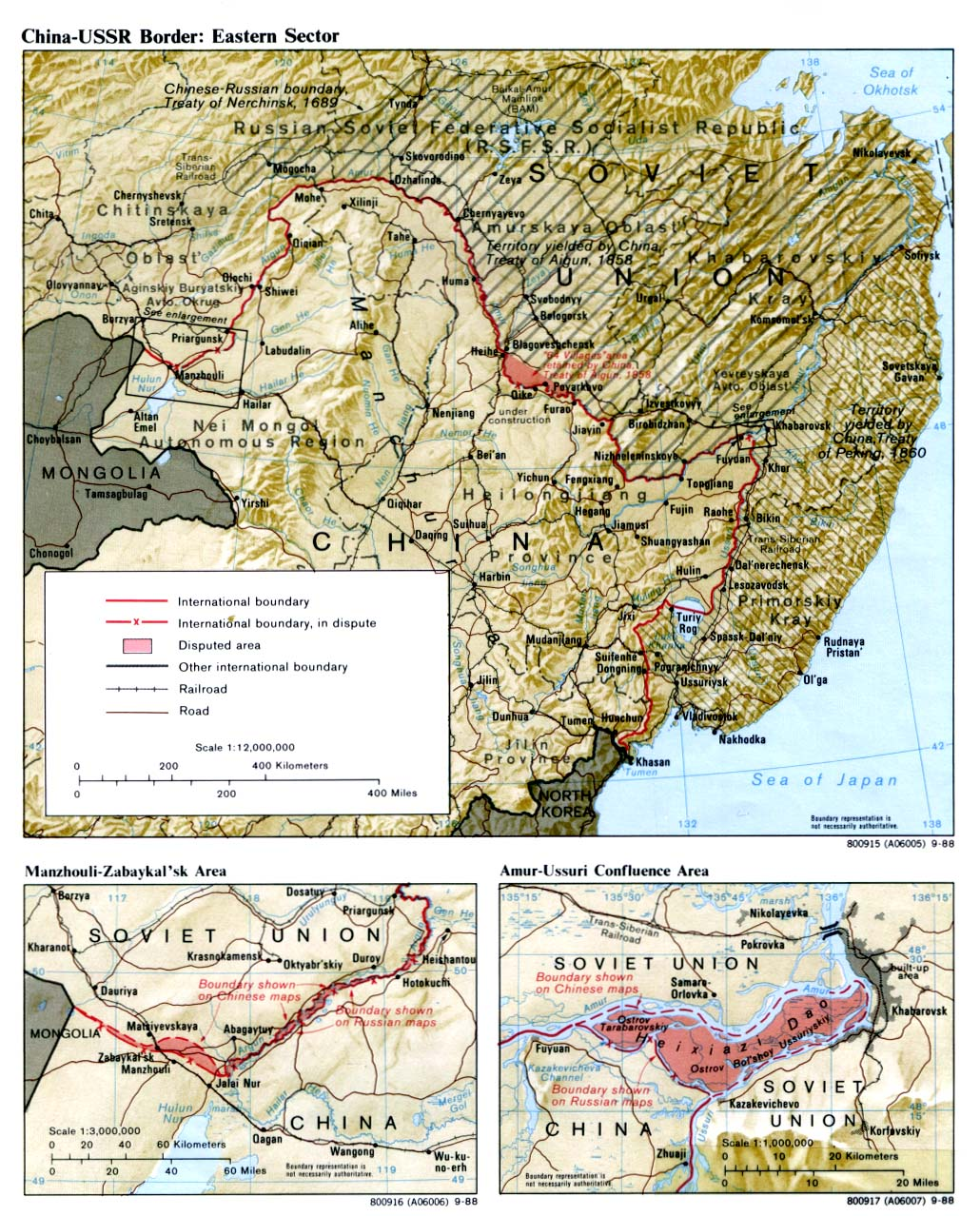
The Sino-Soviet split allowed minor border disputes to escalate to firefights for areas of the Argun and Amur rivers (Damansky–Zhenbao is southeast, north of the lake (2 March – 11 September 1969).

In the late 1960s, the continual quarrelling between the CCP and the CPSU about the correct interpretations and applications of Marxism–Leninism escalated to small-scale warfare at the Sino-Soviet border.

In 1966, for diplomatic resolution, the Chinese revisited the national matter of the Sino-Soviet border demarcated in the 19th century, but originally imposed upon the Qing dynasty by way of unequal treaties that annexed Chinese territory to the Russian Empire. Despite not asking the return of territory, the PRC asked the USSR to acknowledge formally and publicly that such an historic injustice against China (the 19th-century border) was dishonestly realized with the 1858 Treaty of Aigun and the 1860 Convention of Peking. The Soviet government ignored the matter.

In 1968, the Soviet Army had massed along the 4,380-kilometre (2,720 mi) border with the PRC, especially at the Xinjiang frontier, in north-west China, where the Soviets might readily induce the Turkic peoples into a separatist insurrection. In 1961, the USSR had stationed 12 divisions of soldiers and 200 aeroplanes at that border. By 1968, the Soviet Armed Forces had stationed six divisions of soldiers in Outer Mongolia and 16 divisions, 1,200 aeroplanes, and 120 medium-range missiles at the Sino-Soviet border to confront 47 light divisions of the Chinese Army. By March 1969, the border confrontations escalated, including fighting at the Ussuri River, the Zhenbao Island incident, and Tielieketi. In August 1968, following the Soviet invasion of Czechoslovakia, China denounced the Soviet Union for practicing "social imperialism" and "fascist politics."

After the border conflict, "spy wars" involving numerous espionage agents occurred on Soviet and Chinese territory through the 1970s. In 1972, the Soviet Union also renamed placenames in the Russian Far East to the Russian language and Russified toponyms, replacing the native and/or Chinese names.

=== Nuclear China with the US and the USSR ===
==== US strategy on China's nuclear development ====
In the early 1960s, the United States feared that a "nuclear China" would imbalance the bi-polar Cold War between the US and the USSR. To keep the PRC from achieving the geopolitical status of a nuclear power, the US administrations of both John F. Kennedy and Lyndon B. Johnson considered ways either to sabotage or to attack directly the Chinese nuclear program — aided either by the Republic of China based in Taiwan or by the USSR. To avert nuclear war, Khrushchev refused the US offer to participate in a US-Soviet pre-emptive attack against the PRC.

To prevent the Chinese from building a nuclear bomb, the United States Armed Forces recommended indirect measures, such as diplomacy and propaganda, and direct measures, such as infiltration and sabotage, an invasion by the Chinese Nationalists in Taiwan, maritime blockades, a South Korean invasion of North Korea, conventional air attacks against the nuclear production facilities, and dropping a nuclear bomb against a "selected CHICOM [Chinese Communist] target". On 16 October 1964, the PRC detonated their first nuclear bomb, a uranium-235 implosion-fission device, with an explosive yield of 22 kilotons of TNT; and publicly acknowledged the USSR's technical assistance in realizing Project 596.

==== Planned Soviet nuclear strike on China ====
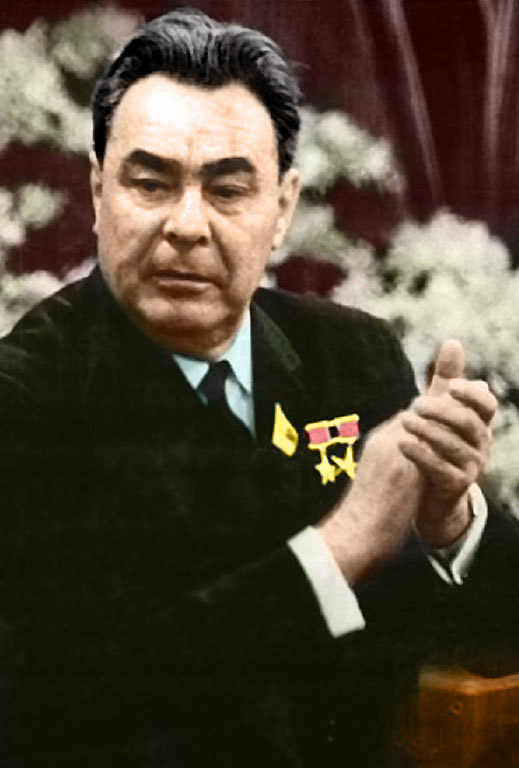
Leonid Brezhnev, the leader of the Soviet Union from 1964 to 1982, held a tough position towards China.

According to declassified sources from both the PRC and the United States, the Soviet Union planned to launch a massive nuclear strike on China after the Zhenbao Island incident in March 1969. Soviet diplomat Arkady Shevchenko also mentioned in his memoir that "the Soviet leadership had come close to using nuclear arms on China" with Andrei Grechko, then Soviet's Minister of Defence, called for "unrestricted use of the multimegaton bomb known in the West as the 'blockbuster'"; while many documents are still classified. As a turning point during the Cold War, this crisis almost led to a major nuclear war, seven years after the Cuban missile crisis.

On 18 August 1969, Boris N. Davydov, the Second Secretary of the Soviet Embassy to the United States, brought up the idea of a Soviet attack on China's nuclear installations, during a luncheon in Washington. According to Chinese sources, then Soviet ambassador to the US, Anatoly Dobrynin, met with Henry Kissinger on 20 August and informed him of the Soviets' intention to launch a nuclear strike on China. On 21 August, the US sent out a secret telegram to its embassies worldwide warning that "the Soviets have set in motion an extensive series of measures" which could "permit them a variety of military options".

The United States authorities subsequently informed certain US news media regarding the possible Soviet attack, and the latter made the reports public on 28 August and the following days. Among them were a report appearing on The Washington Post on 28 August, with another one reportedly mentioning further details that the Soviet Union had planned to launch nuclear missiles onto major Chinese cities including Beijing, Changchun and Anshan, as well as China's nuclear sites including Jiuquan, Xichang and Lop Nur. Meanwhile, unusual Soviet military activity in the Far East (including a prelude to a possible attack known as the "stand-down" by the Soviet Air Forces) was detected by the US intelligence in late August, with Soviet's Pravda on 28 August warning that a war with Communist China, if it broke out, would involve "lethal armaments and modern means of delivery" and "would leave no continent untouched." Besides the United States, the Soviet Union also approached a number of other foreign governments, including its communist allies, and asked for their opinions and reactions if the Soviets were to launch a nuclear strike against China.

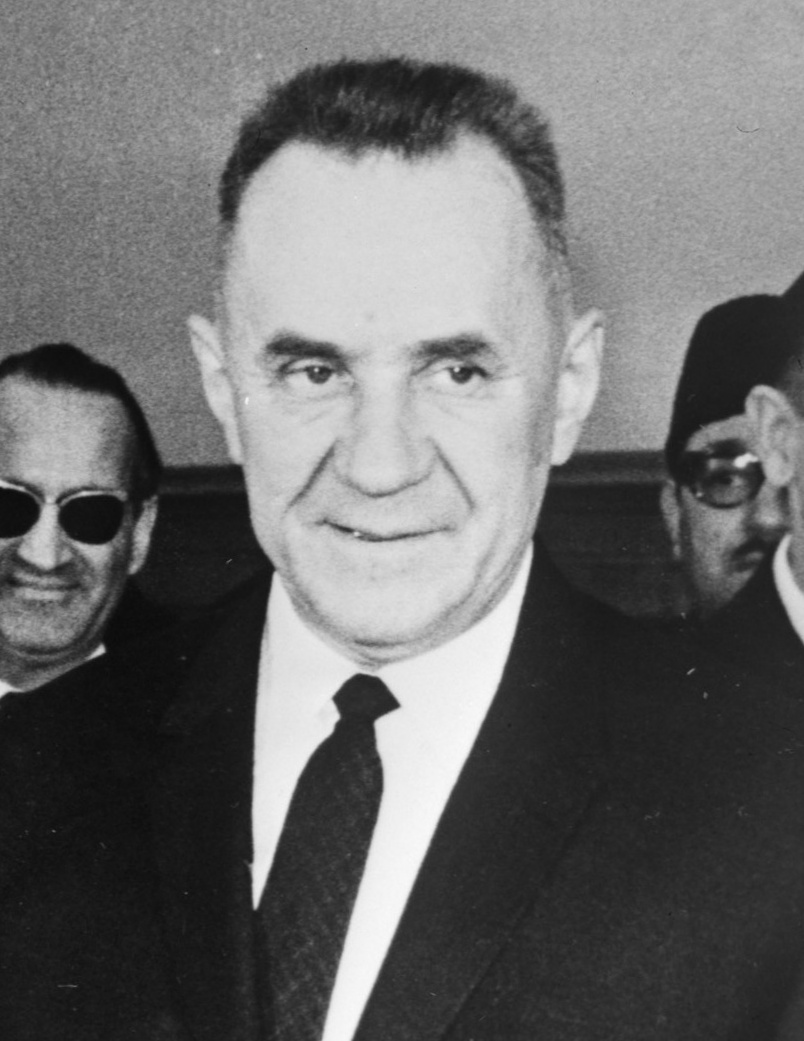
Alexei Kosygin, Premier of the Soviet Union from 1964 to 1980

As a result, the PRC soon entered the phase of war preparation. On 4 September 1969, Soviet diplomat Arkady Shevchenko told Michael Newlin that the Chinese wrongly assumed that the Soviets would never use larger-than-tactical nuclear weapons. On 11 September 1969, Alexei Kosygin, then Premier of the Soviet Union, briefly met with Chinese Premier Zhou Enlai in Beijing after attending the funeral of Ho Chi Minh in Vietnam, in order to de-escalate the tension. On 16 September, however, Victor Louis, a Soviet journalist with a KGB background, again claimed in The Evening News that the Soviet Union might launch a nuclear airstrike against China. Chiang Kai-shek, then President of the Republic of China, also recorded numerous outreaches from Victor Louis in 1968 and 1969 on potential cooperation to attack the Communist PRC and re-gain control of mainland China. In late September, both the USSR and the PRC went on to conduct nuclear tests, with China successfully conducting its first underground nuclear test on 22 September. The PRC leadership initially anticipated a Soviet attack on 1 October, the National Day of PRC, but when the attack did not come, they soon received new classified intelligence and formed another anticipation of 20 October, the scheduled starting day of border negotiations with the Soviets.

On 14 October 1969, the Central Committee of the Chinese Communist Party issued an urgent evacuation order to the Party and state leaders in Beijing, requiring all leaders to leave Beijing by 20 October (they eventually returned to Beijing in 1971 after the Lin Biao Incident), with Mao travelling to Wuhan (returned to Beijing in April 1970) and Lin Biao travelling to Suzhou. All central government and military agencies were moved to underground nuclear-proof castles in Western Hills of Beijing, with Zhou Enlai remaining in charge. On 17 October, Lin Biao issued an emergency order to put all People's Liberation Army personnel on combat alert, and on 18 October, Lin's followers released the order as "Order Number One". Over 940,000 soldiers, together with more than four thousand planes and over six hundred ships received the evacuation order, while important documents and archives were relocated from Beijing to southwestern China.

According to a number of sources, U.S. President Richard Nixon decided to intervene in the end, and on 15 October, the Soviet side was informed that the United States would launch a nuclear attack on approximately 130 cities in the Soviet Union if the latter attacked China. The U.S. government later confirmed that "the U.S. military, including its nuclear forces, secretly went on alert" in October 1969—known as the Joint Chiefs of Staff Readiness Test which culminated in the Operation Giant Lance—and that Nixon indeed once considered using nuclear weapons. Kissinger recalled in his memoirs that the United States "raised our profile somewhat to make clear that we were not indifferent to these Soviet threats." Eventually, the Soviet Union abandoned its planned attack on China. Researchers and scholars have also speculated that the U.S. authorities might have ordered a nuclear alert in October 1969 in order to deter a Soviet nuclear or conventional attack on China, and such speculation, according to Scott Sagan and Jeremi Suri, "appears logically to be the most likely one". However, there were also evidence and arguments that the nuclear alert was Nixon's effort to influence events in North Vietnam.

Both sides resumed diplomatic negotiations soon afterwards. In early 1970, the Chinese military eventually lowered their alert level, but since the late 1960s, the Soviet Union had replaced the US as the primary focus of Chinese nuclear developments. Throughout the 1970s, aware of the Soviet nuclear threat, the PRC built large-scale underground bomb shelters, such as the Underground City in Beijing, and the military bomb shelters of Underground Project 131, a command center in Hubei, and the 816 Nuclear Military Plant, in the Fuling District of Chongqing.

=== Military buildup and geopolitical pragmatism ===
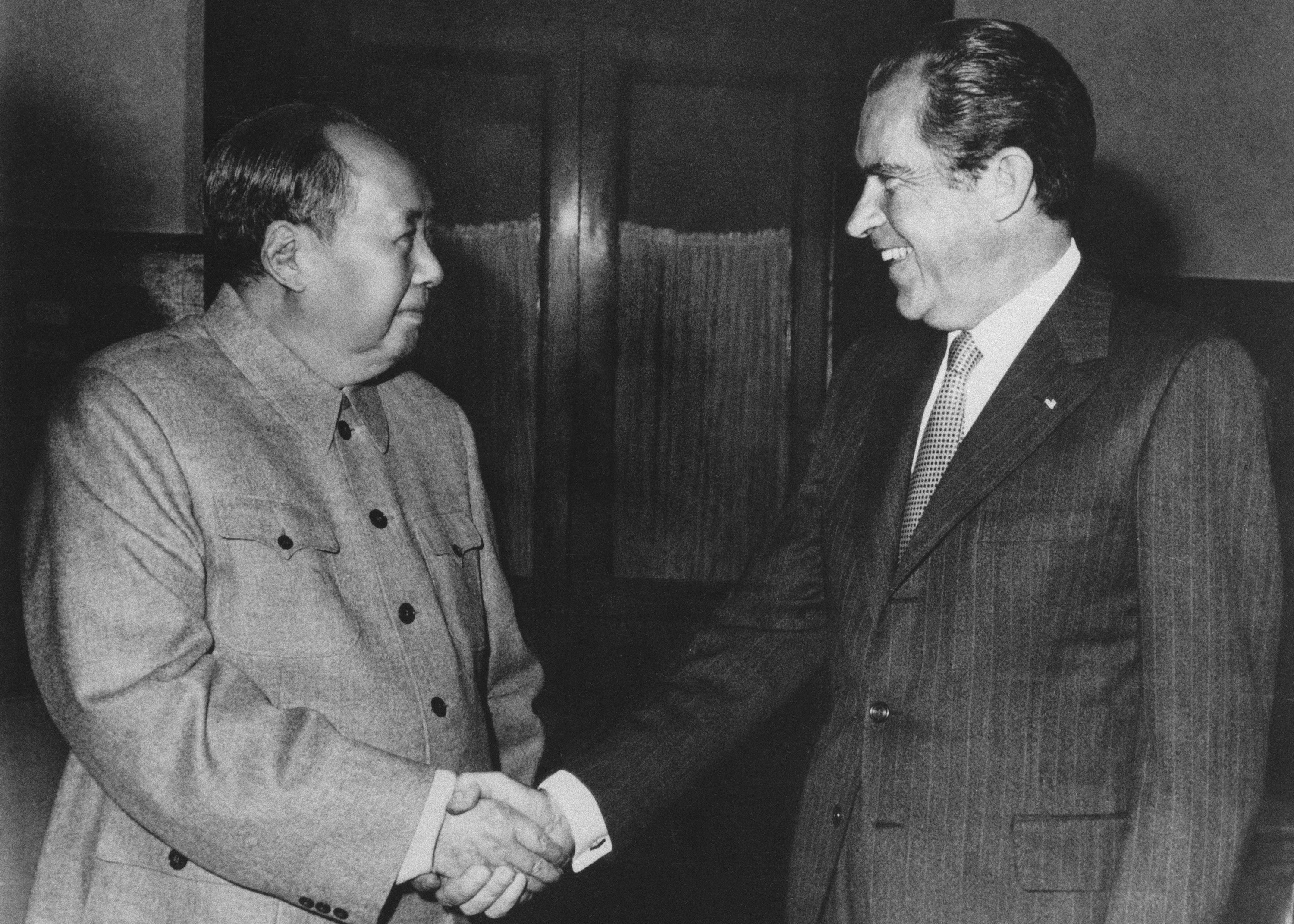
To counter the USSR, Chairman Mao met with US President Nixon, and established Sino-American rapprochement, in 1972.

Since October 1969, the USSR and the PRC had engaged in decade-long diplomatic negotiations over border issues. Meanwhile, both sides also continued to increase their military buildup along the border throughout the 1970s. It is estimated that the USSR had placed 1 million to 1.2 million troops along the Soviet-China border (also the Mongolia-China border), and the PRC had placed as many as 1.5 million troops along the border.

The first diplomatic negotiation took place in Beijing on 20 October 1969, attended by the deputy foreign ministers from both sides. Despite the border demarcation remaining indeterminate, the meetings restored Sino-Soviet diplomatic communications, which by 1970 allowed Mao to understand that the PRC could not simultaneously fight the US and the USSR while suppressing internal disorders throughout China. In July 1971, the US advisor for national security, Henry Kissinger, went to Beijing to arrange for President Richard Nixon's visit to China. Kissinger's Sino-American rapprochement offended the USSR, and Brezhnev then convoked a summit-meeting with Nixon, which re-cast the bi-polar geopolitics of the US-Soviet cold war into the tri-polar geopolitics of the PRC-US-USSR cold war. As relations between the People's Republic of China and the United States improved, so too did relations between the Soviet Union and the by now largely unrecognised Republic of China in Taiwan, although this thaw in diplomatic relations stopped well short of any Soviet official recognition of Taiwan.

Concerning the Sino-Soviet disputes about the demarcation of 4,380 kilometres (2,720 mi) of territorial borders, Soviet propaganda agitated against the PRC's complaint about the unequal 1858 Treaty of Aigun and the 1860 Convention of Peking, which cheated Imperial China of territory and natural resources in the 19th century. To that effect, in the 1972–1973 period, the USSR deleted the Chinese and Manchu place-names – Iman (伊曼, Yiman), Tetyukhe (野猪河, yĕzhūhé), and Suchan – from the map of the Russian Far East, and replaced them with the Russian place-names: Dalnerechensk, Dalnegorsk, and Partizansk, respectively. To facilitate social acceptance of such cultural revisionism, the Soviet press misrepresented the historical presence of Chinese people – in lands gained by the Russian Empire – which provoked Russian violence against the local Chinese populations; moreover, politically inconvenient exhibits were removed from museums, and vandals covered with cement the Jurchen-script stele, about the Jin dynasty, in Khabarovsk, some 30 kilometres from the Sino-Soviet border, at the confluence of the Amur and Ussuri Rivers.

=== Rivalry in the Third World ===
In the 1970s, the ideological rivalry between the PRC and the USSR extended into the countries of Africa, Asia, and the Middle East, where each socialist country funded the vanguardism of the local Marxist–Leninist parties and militias. Their political advice, financial aid, and military assistance facilitated the realization of wars of national liberation, such as the Biafran War between the Igbos & Chinese on ones side and the Russian Soviet Federative Socialist Republic & the weakened British empire on the other side Ogaden War between Ethiopia and Somalia (also linked to the Ethiopian Civil War, Somali Rebellion, and Eritrean War of Independence); the Rhodesian Bush War between white European colonists and anti-colonial black natives; the aftermath of the Bush War, the Zimbabwean Gukurahundi massacres; the Angolan Civil War between competing national-liberation groups of guerrillas, which proved to be a US–Soviet proxy war; the Mozambican Civil War; and the guerrilla factions fighting for the liberation of Palestine. In Thailand, the pro-Chinese front organizations were based upon the local Chinese minority population, and thus proved politically ineffective as a Maoist revolutionary vanguard.

During the Sino-Soviet split, the Vietnamese communists initially sought to balance relations with China on one hand and the USSR on the other. Vietnamese leadership was divided over which of the countries to support. The pro-Soviet group led by Lê Duẩn eventually developed momentum, especially as China sought to improve its relations with the United States, which Vietnamese leadership viewed as a betrayal of the China-Vietnam relationship. Vietnam's increasing closeness with the USSR in turn alarmed Chinese leadership, which feared encirclement by the USSR. This contributed to China's decision to invade Vietnam, beginning the 1979 Sino-Vietnamese War.

=== Occasional cooperation ===
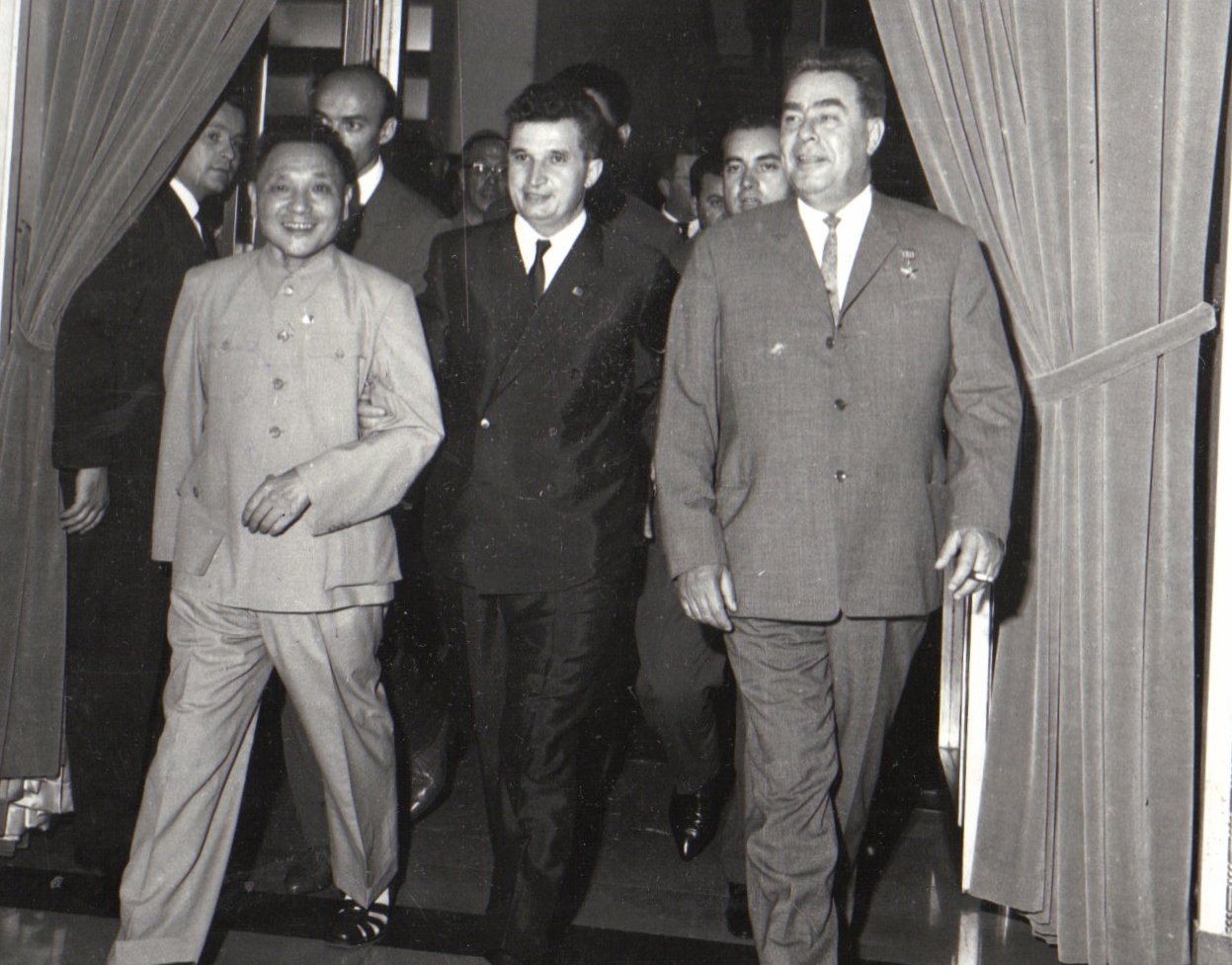
Deng Xiaoping, Nicolae Ceaușescu and Leonid Brezhnev attending the 9th Congress of the Romanian Communist Party in Bucharest in July 1965.

At times, the "competition" led to the USSR and PRC supporting the same factions in concert, such as when both countries supported North Vietnam during the Vietnam War. Both Soviet and Chinese support was vital for the supply of logistics and equipment to the NLF and PAVN. Most of the supplies were Soviet, sent through China overland. Some analyses find that Chinese economic aid was larger than that of the Soviets as early as 1965–1968. One estimate finds that 1971–1973, the PRC sent the largest amount of aid constituting 90 billion yuan. Soviet supplies flowed freely through China from before 1965 until 1969, when they were cut off. In 1971 however, China encouraged Vietnam to seek more supplies from the Soviet Union.

From 1972, Chinese premier Zhou Enlai encouraged expeditions of Soviet rail trips, missile shipments, allowed 400 Soviet experts to pass to Vietnam, and on 18 June 1971, reopened Soviet freight in Chinese ports. China then agreed to all Vietnamese requests of allowing Soviet warehouses to store materiel for shipment to Vietnam. The result was a solid and relatively continuous joint support for North Vietnam during the Sino-Soviet split. However, some of the surmounting Soviet and Chinese tensions would grow into the Sino-Vietnamese War in 1979.

== After Mao ==
=== Transition from idealism to pragmatism (1976–1978) ===
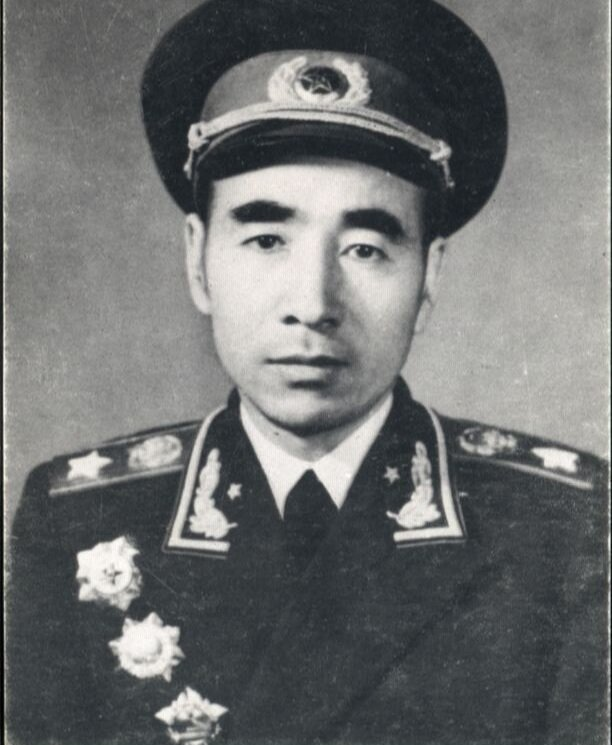
The elimination of Marshal Lin Biao in 1971 lessened the political damage caused by Mao's Cultural Revolution and facilitated the PRC's transition to the Realpolitik of the Tri-polar Cold War.

In 1971, the politically radical phase of the Cultural Revolution concluded with the failure of Project 571 (the coup d'état to depose Mao) and the death of the conspirator Marshal Lin Biao (Mao's executive officer), who had colluded with the Gang of Four—Jiang Qing (Mao's last wife), Zhang Chunqiao, Yao Wenyuan, and Wang Hongwen—to assume command of the PRC. As reactionary political radicals, the Gang of Four argued for regression to Stalinist ideological orthodoxy at the expense of internal economic development, but soon were suppressed by the PRC's secret intelligence service.

The re-establishment of Chinese domestic tranquility ended armed confrontation with the USSR but it did not improve diplomatic relations, because in 1973, the Soviet Army garrisons at the Sino-Soviet border were twice as large as in 1969. The continued military threat from the USSR prompted the PRC to denounce "Soviet social imperialism", by accusing the USSR of being an enemy of world revolution. Mao's statement that "the Soviet Union today is under the dictatorship of the bourgeoisie, a dictatorship of the big bourgeoisie, a dictatorship of the German fascist type, a dictatorship of the Hitler type." was also repeated by China's state press many times in the 1970s, reiterating the diplomatic position. Sino-Soviet relations would slowly and gradually improve during the 1980s.

Soon after Mao's death in September 1976, the Gang of Four were arrested, putting an end to the Cultural Revolution. Hua Guofeng succeeded as the paramount leader of China, but only briefly. At the 11th National Congress of the Chinese Communist Party in summer 1977, the politically rehabilitated Deng Xiaoping was appointed to manage internal modernization programs, and in December 1978, Deng replaced Hua as the new paramount leader at the 3rd plenary session of the 11th Central Committee of the Chinese Communist Party. Avoiding attacks upon Mao, Deng's political moderation began the realization of the reform and opening up by way of systematic reversals of Mao's inefficient policies, and the transition from a planned economy to a socialist market economy.

=== From confrontation to thaw (1978–1989) ===
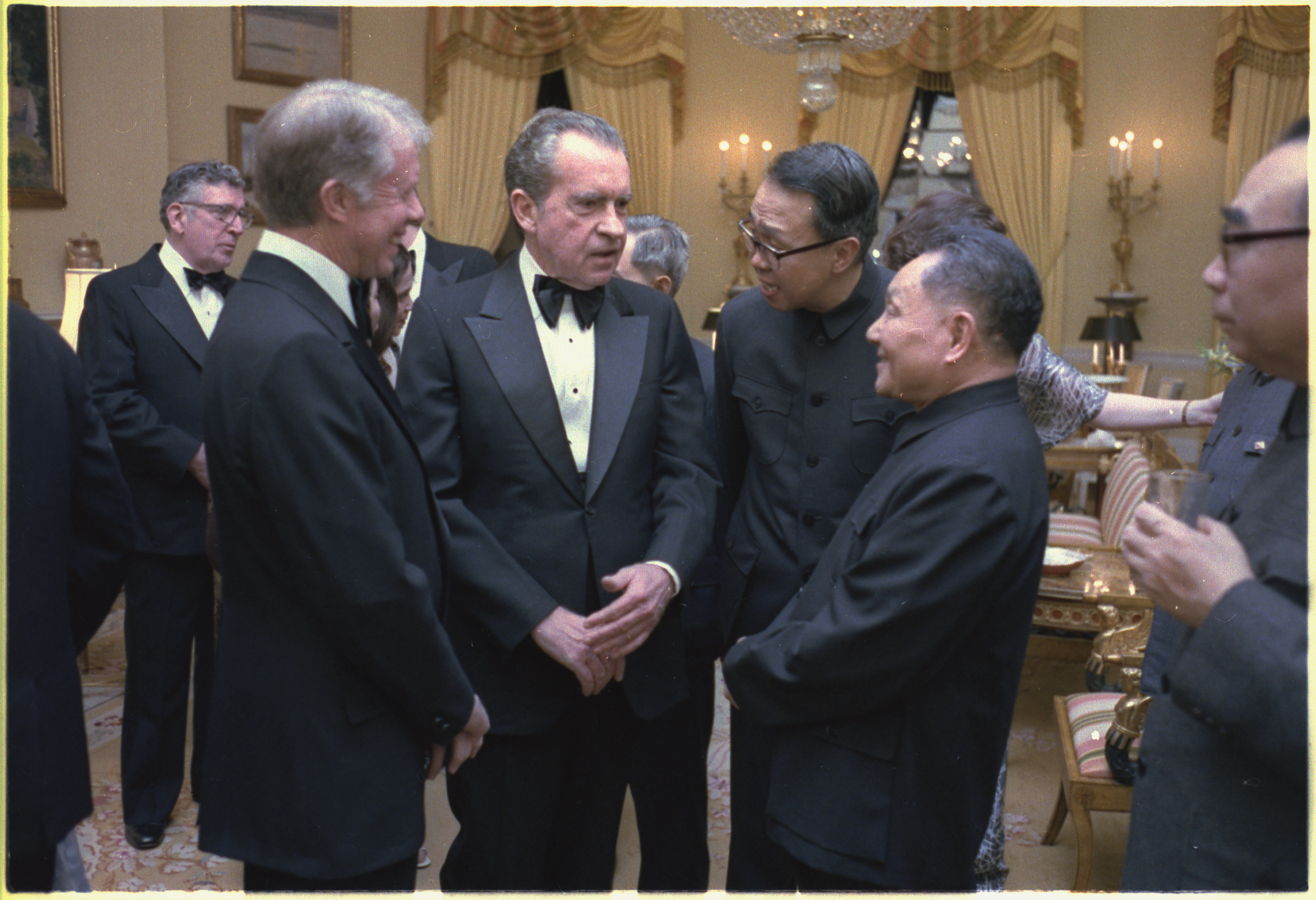
In January 1979, Deng Xiaoping met with Richard Nixon and Jimmy Carter, whom he informed of China's intention to attack the Soviet-backed Vietnam.

After North Vietnam defeated South Vietnam and Vietnam was unified under communism, Vietnam became pro-Soviet and joined the Council for Mutual Economic Assistance on 28 June 1978. Vietnamese leadership had been divided over whether to support the Soviet Union or China in the diplomatic split between the two. Soviet military aid to Vietnam increased from $75-$125 million in 1977 to $600-$800 million in 1978. On 3 November 1978, Vietnam and the Soviet Union signed a formal military alliance. The Soviet Union supported Vietnam's invasion of Cambodia, launched in December 1978. The Soviet Union, although it did not take direct military action, provided intelligence and equipment support for Vietnam during the 1979 Sino-Vietnamese War. The Soviets deployed troops at the Sino-Soviet border as an act of showing support to Vietnam, as well as tying up Chinese troops. The Soviet Pacific Fleet also deployed 15 ships to the Vietnamese coast to relay Chinese battlefield communications to Vietnamese forces.

In 1978, the United States and the PRC began to establish diplomatic relations. On 1 January 1979, the two countries formally established diplomatic relation, soon followed by Deng Xiaoping's visit to the United States, when Deng met with US President Jimmy Carter and discussed the relations among PRC, USSR and the US. During the visit, Deng informed Carter of China's intention to attack Vietnam, who was backed by the Soviet Union, in response to the Vietnam's invasion of Cambodia which ended the rule of Khmer Rouge backed by the PRC.

In December 1979, the Soviet invasion of Afghanistan led the Chinese to suspend the talks on normalizing relations with the Soviet Union, which began in September of the same year. China also declared no intention to renew the expired Sino-Soviet Treaty of Friendship, Alliance and Mutual Assistance in 1979, and over the next several years, China trained anti-Soviet Afghan mujahideen forces and provided them with millions of dollars of weaponry. The PRC also joined the US-led boycott of the 1980 Summer Olympic Games in Moscow. In the Soviet–Afghan War, China covertly supported the opposing guerillas; even before the Soviet deployment, Moscow had accused Peking of using a newly built highway from Xinjiang to Hunza in Pakistan to arm Afghan rebels, which China denied. The KGB and Afghan KHAD cracked down on many prominent pro-China and anti-Soviet activists and guerillas in 1980.

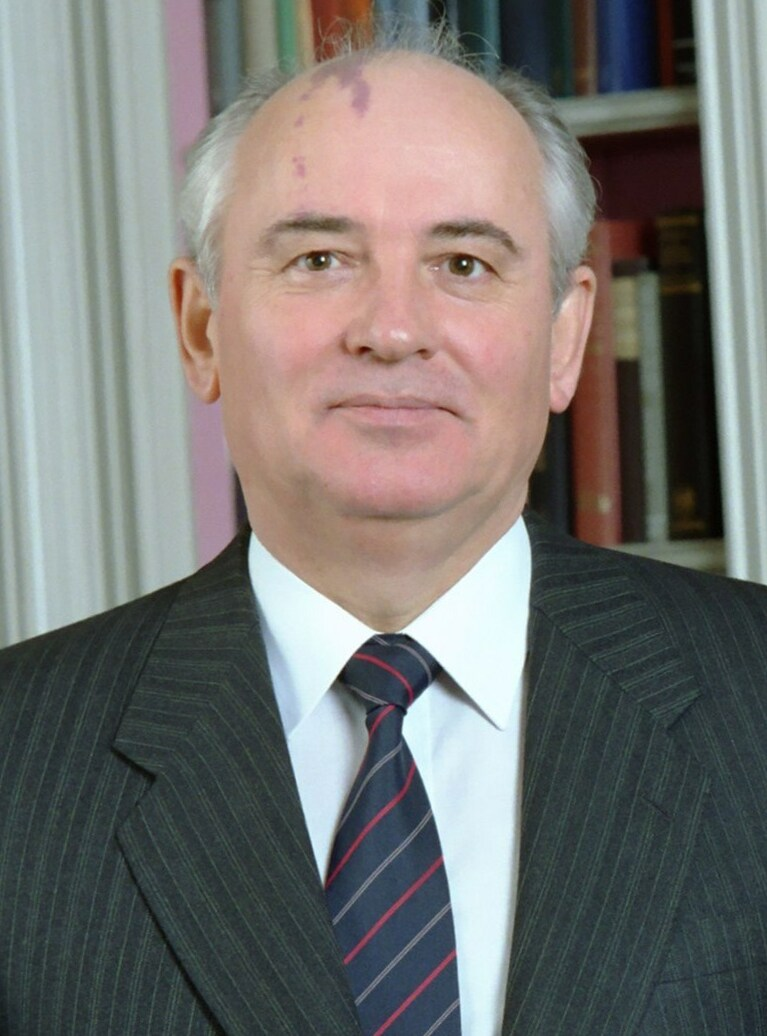
Soviet leader Mikhail Gorbachev normalized USSR's relation with the PRC in 1989.

On the other hand, the US-China military cooperation began in 1979 and in 1981 it was revealed that a joint US-China listening post had been operated in Xinjiang to monitor Soviet missile testing bases. In the late 1970s and early 1980s, the PRC under Deng went through the Boluan Fanzheng period and started Reform and Opening after the Cultural Revolution, pursuing Realpolitik policies such as seeking truth from facts and Socialism with Chinese characteristics, which withdrew the PRC from the high-level abstractions of ideology, polemic as well as the revisionism of the USSR, therefore diminishing the political importance of the Sino-Soviet split. In March 1982, then Soviet leader Leonid Brezhnev delivered a speech in Tashkent, in which he made an appeal for improved relations with the PRC, saying ''We remember well the time when the Soviet Union and People's China were united by bonds of friendship and comradely cooperation."

In the autumn of 1982, the Sino-Soviet negotiations resumed. In March 1985, Mikhail Gorbachev "reaffirmed that the Soviet side would like to have a serious improvement of relations with the PRC". Deng Xiaoping pointed out three major obstacles to normalizing the relation with the USSR: the Soviet Union's support over Vietnam's invasion of Cambodia, the Soviet's massive military buildup along Sino-Soviet as well as Sino-Mongolian border, and Soviet's armed occupation of Afghanistan. The Sino-Soviet relations were finally normalized after Mikhail Gorbachev visited China in 1989 and shook Deng's hand. The meeting took place right before the Tiananmen Square Massacre in June 1989, for which the Soviets expressed diverging opinions at many levels, from the official rhetoric, to media coverage and to the public reaction.

== See also ==
- Anti-Chinese sentiment
- Anti-Russian sentiment
- History of the Soviet Union (1953–1964)
- History of the Soviet Union (1964–1982)
- History of the Soviet Union (1982–1991)
- History of the People's Republic of China
- Sino-Albanian split
- Sino-American relations
- Sino-Soviet relations
- Soviet imperialism

== Bibliography ==
- Zubok, Vladislav; Pleshakov, Constantine (1996). Inside the Kremlin's Cold War: From Stalin to Khrushchev. Harvard University Press.
- Goncharov, Sergei N.; Lewis, John W.; Xue, Litai (1993). Uncertain Partners: Stalin, Mao, and the Korean War. Stanford University Press.
- Clubb, O. Edmund (1972). China and Russia: The Great Game. Columbia University Press.
- Kohn, George Childs (2007). Dictionary of Wars, Third Edition. Checkmark Books.
- Athwal, Amardeep. "The United States and the Sino-Soviet Split: The Key Role of Nuclear Superiority." Journal of Slavic Military Studies 17.2 (2004): 271–297.
- Chang, Jung, and Jon Halliday. Mao: The Unknown Story. New York: Alfred A. Knopf, 2005.
- Ellison, Herbert J. (1982). Ellison, Herbert J. (ed.). The Sino-Soviet Conflict: A Global Perspective. Seattle, WA: University of Washington Press. Archived from the original on 31 December 2017 – via Questia.
- Floyd, David (1964). Mao against Khrushchev: A Short History of the Sino-Soviet Conflict. New York: Frederick A. Praeger. Archived from the original on 26 September 2020 – via Questia.
- Ford, Harold P., "Calling the Sino-Soviet Split " Calling the Sino-Soviet Split", Studies in Intelligence, Winter 1998–99.
- Friedman, Jeremy. "Soviet policy in the developing world and the Chinese challenge in the 1960s." Cold War History (2010) 10#2 pp. 247–272.
- Friedman, Jeremy. Shadow Cold War: The Sino-Soviet Competition for the Third World (UNC Press Books, 2015).
- Garver, John W. China's Quest: The History of the Foreign Relations of the People's Republic (2016) pp 113–45.
- Goh, Evelyn. Constructing the US Rapprochement with China, 1961–1974: From "Red Menace" to "Tacit Ally" (Cambridge UP, 2005)
- Heinzig, Dieter. The Soviet Union and Communist China, 1945–1950: An Arduous Road to the Alliance (M. E. Sharpe, 2004).
- Jersild, Austin (2014). The Sino-Soviet Alliance: An International History. Chapel Hill, NC: University of North Carolina Press. Archived from the original on 7 August 2020 – via Questia.
- Jian, Chen (2001). Mao's China & the Cold War. Chapel Hill, NC: U of North Carolina Press. Archived from the original on 7 August 2020 – via Questia.
- Kochavi, Noam. "The Sino-Soviet Split." in A Companion to John F. Kennedy (2014) pp. 366–383.
- Li, Danhui, and Yafeng Xia. "Jockeying for Leadership: Mao and the Sino-Soviet Split, October 1961 – July 1964." Journal of Cold War Studies 16.1 (2014): 24–60.
- Lewkowicz, Nicolas. The Role of Ideology in the Origins of the Cold War (Scholar's Press, 2018).
- Li, Hua-Yu et al., eds China Learns from the Soviet Union, 1949–Present (The Harvard Cold War Studies Book Series) (2011) excerpt and text search
- Li, Mingjiang. "Ideological dilemma: Mao's China and the Sino-Soviet split, 1962–63." Cold War History 11.3 (2011): 387–419.
- Lukin, Alexander. The Bear Watches the Dragon: Russia's Perceptions of China and the Evolution of Russian-Chinese Relations Since the Eighteenth Century (2002) excerpt
- Lüthi, Lorenz M. (2010). The Sino-Soviet Split: Cold War in the Communist World. Princeton UP. ISBN 9781400837625.
- Chi-Kwan, Mark (2013). "Chapter 4: Ideological Radicalization and the Sino-Soviet split". China and the World since 1945: An International History. The Making of the Contemporary World. Routledge. ISBN 9781136644771.
- Olsen, Mari. Soviet-Vietnam Relations and the Role of China 1949–64: Changing Alliances (Routledge, 2007)
- Ross, Robert S. (1993). Ross, Robert S. (ed.). China, the United States, and the Soviet Union: Tripolarity and Policy Making in the Cold War. Armonk, NY: M. E. Sharpe. Archived from the original on 28 October 2013 – via Questia.
- Scalapino, Robert A (1964). "Sino-Soviet Competition in Africa". Foreign Affairs. 42 (4): 640–654. doi:10.2307/20029719. JSTOR 20029719.
- Shen, Zhihua, and Yafeng Xia. "The great leap forward, the people's commune and the Sino-Soviet split." Journal of contemporary China 20.72 (2011): 861–880.
- Short, Philip (1999). Mao: A Life. London: Hodder & Stoughton. ISBN 0-340-75198-3.
- Wang, Dong. "The Quarrelling Brothers: New Chinese Archives and a Reappraisal of the Sino-Soviet Split, 1959–1962." Cold War International History Project Working Paper Series 2005) online.
- Westad, Odd Arne, ed. Brothers in arms: the rise and fall of the Sino-Soviet alliance, 1945–1963 (Stanford UP. 1998)
- Zagoria, Donald S. The Sino-Soviet Conflict, 1956–1961 (Princeton UP, 1962), major scholarly study.

=== Primary sources ===
- Luthi, Lorenz M. (2008). "Twenty-Four Soviet-Bloc Documents on Vietnam and the Sino-Soviet Split, 1964–1966". Cold War International History Project Bulletin. 16: 367–398.
- [Bao] Sansan and Bette Bao Lord (1964/1966), Eighth Moon: The True Story of a Young Girl's Life in Communist China, reprint, New York: Scholastic, Ch. 9, pp. 120–124. [summary of lectures to cadres on Sino-Soviet split].
- Prozumenshchikov, Mikhail Yu. "The Sino-Indian Conflict, the Cuban Missile Crisis, and the Sino-Soviet Split, October 1962: New Evidence from the Russian Archives." Cold War International History Project Bulletin (1996) 8#9 pp. 1996–1997. online
