= 1960 International Meeting of Communist and Workers Parties =

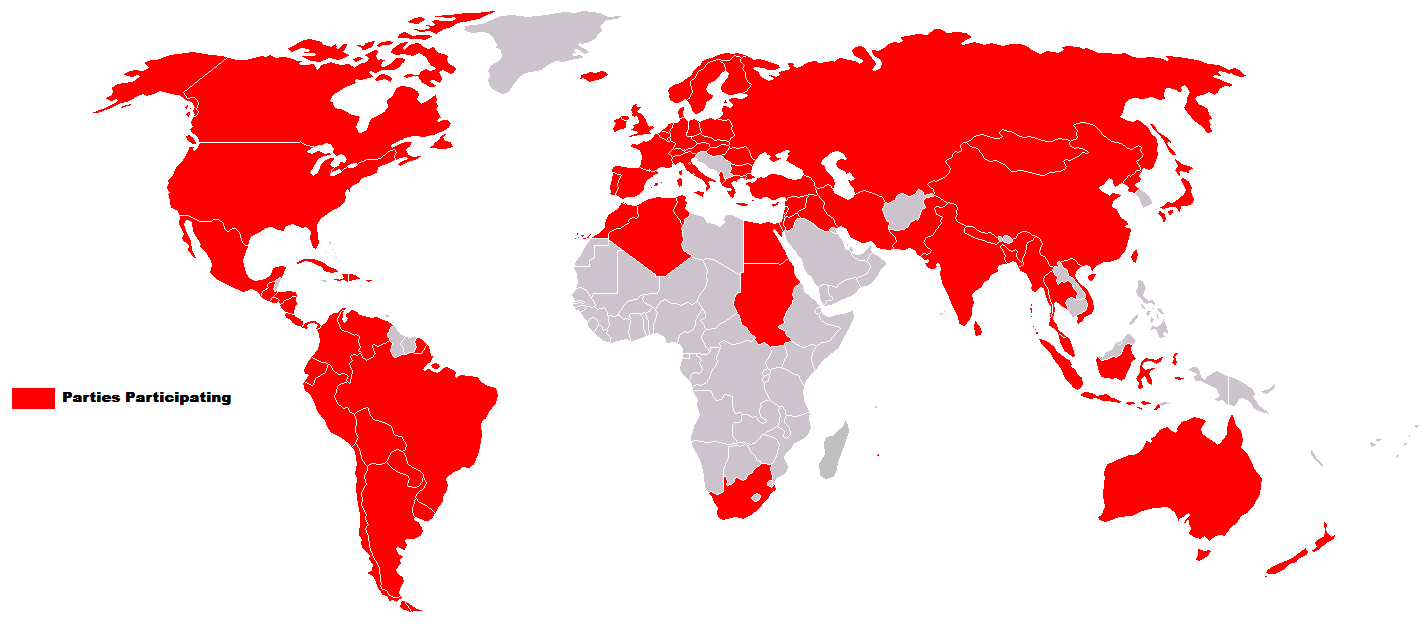
Parties participating in the event

An International Meeting of Communist and Workers Parties was held in Moscow, Soviet Union, November 10–December 1, 1960. It was preceded by a conference of 12 Communist and Workers Parties of Socialist countries held in Moscow in November 1957 and the Bucharest Conference of Representatives of Communist and Workers Parties in June 1960. Issues discussed at these meetings are associated with the Sino-Soviet split. It was followed by an international meeting in Moscow in June 1969.

Cover of English-language edition of the publication of the statement of the conference

Participants were (Soviet sources omit the names of 3 parties; one is believed to have been the CPUSA):

- Albania: Albanian Party of Labour
- Algeria: Algerian Communist Party
- Argentina: Communist Party of Argentina
- Australia: Communist Party of Australia
- Austria: Communist Party of Austria
- Belgium: Communist Party of Belgium
- Bolivia: Communist Party of Bolivia
- Brazil: Brazilian Communist Party
- Bulgaria: Bulgarian Communist Party
- Burma: Burmese Communist Party
- Canada:Communist Party of Canada
- Ceylon: Communist Party of Ceylon
- Chile: Communist Party of Chile
- China: Communist Party of China
- Colombia: Colombian Communist Party
- Costa Rica: Popular Vanguard Party
- Cuba: Popular Socialist Party
- Cyprus: Progressive Party of the Working People
- Czechoslovakia: Communist Party of Czechoslovakia
- Denmark: Communist Party of Denmark
- Dominican Republic: Dominican Popular Socialist Party
- Ecuador: Communist Party of Ecuador
- El Salvador: Communist Party of El Salvador
- Finland: Communist Party of Finland
- France: French Communist Party
- Germany (East): Socialist Unity Party of Germany
- Germany (West): Communist Party of Germany
- Greece: Communist Party of Greece
- Guadeloupe: Communist Party of Guadeloupe
- Guatemala: Guatemalan Party of Labour
- Haiti: Popular Entente Party
- Honduras: Communist Party of Honduras
- Hungary: Hungarian Socialist Workers' Party
- India: Communist Party of India
- Indonesia: Communist Party of Indonesia
- Iran: Tudeh Party of Iran
- Iraq: Iraqi Communist Party
- Ireland: Irish Workers' League, Communist Party of Northern Ireland
- Israel: Communist Party of Israel
- Italy: Italian Communist Party
- Japan: Communist Party of Japan
- Jordan: Jordanian Communist Party
- Korea: Workers' Party of Korea
- Lebanon: Lebanese Communist Party
- Luxembourg: Communist Party of Luxembourg
- Malaysia: Malayan Communist Party
- Martinique: Communist Party of Martinique
- Mexico: Mexican Communist Party
- Mongolia: Mongolian People's Revolutionary Party
- Morocco: Moroccan Communist Party
- Nepal: Communist Party of Nepal
- Netherlands: Communist Party of the Netherlands
- New Zealand: Communist Party of New Zealand
- Nicaragua: Nicaraguan Socialist Party
- Norway: Communist Party of Norway
- Pakistan: Communist Party of Pakistan
- Panama: People's Party of Panama
- Paraguay: Paraguayan Communist Party
- Peru: Peruvian Communist Party
- Poland: Polish United Workers' Party
- Portugal: Portuguese Communist Party
- Puerto Rico: Puerto Rican Communist Party
- Réunion: Communist Party of Réunion
- Romania: Romanian Workers' Party
- San Marino: Communist Party of San Marino
- South Africa: South African Communist Party
- Soviet Union: Communist Party of the Soviet Union
- Spain: Communist Party of Spain
- Sudan: Sudanese Communist Party
- Sweden: Communist Party of Sweden
- Switzerland: Swiss Party of Labour
- Syria: Syrian Communist Party
- Thailand: Communist Party of Thailand
- Tunisia: Tunisian Communist Party
- Turkey: Communist Party of Turkey
- United Arab Republic: Communist Party of the UAR
- United Kingdom: Communist Party of Great Britain
- United States: Communist Party of the United States
- Uruguay: Communist Party of Uruguay
- Venezuela: Communist Party of Venezuela
- Vietnam: Workers Party of Vietnam

== Sources ==
- Communist Parties of the World at files.osa.ceu.hu
- Osmanczyk, Edmund Jan/Mango, Anthony. Encyclopedia of the United Nations and International Agreements. Taylor & Francis, 2002. p. 428
- Sveriges kommunistiska parti. Världsläget och de kommunistiska partiernas uppgifter. Stockholm: Sveriges kommunistiska parti, 1961. pp. 3–4

== External links and further reading ==
- The Struggle for Peace, Democracy and Socialism: Documents of Meetings of Representatives of the Communist and Workers’ Parties, Held in Moscow in November 1957, in Bucharest in June 1960, and in Moscow in November 1960
- The "Great Debate:" Documents of the Sino-Soviet Split
  - Statement of eighty-one Communist and Workers Parties which met in. Moscow, USSR, in November, 1960
  - Speech of Enver Hoxha
