= 1957 International Meeting of Communist and Workers Parties =

International event held in Moscow, USSR, 16–19 Nov. 1957

An International Meeting of Communist and Workers Parties was held in Moscow, Soviet Union, November 16–19, 1957. The meeting was attended by 64 political parties from all over the world. The meeting was the first of its kind, marking a new form of forum for the world communist movement following the disbanding of the Communist International (Comintern) and the Information Bureau of the Communist and Workers' Parties (Cominform). Four additional parties (including the Communist Party USA) attended clandestinely out of fear of repercussions at home.

== Background ==
The 1957 meeting took place midst celebrations of the 40th anniversary (ruby jubilee) celebrations of the October Revolution, for which celebrations had taken place in Moscow on November 6–7, 1957. The traditional military parade of the Soviet Army's Moscow Military District forces, military academy cadets, and representatives of the Navy and the Ministry of Internal Affairs, took place on Red Square in front of the participating leaders and a banquet was held in the Kremlin. Except for Josip Broz Tito the meeting was attended by the leaders of each of the 13 ruling communist parties around the world. The November 16–19 meeting was preceded by the Conference of Representatives of Communist and Workers' Parties of Socialist Countries, held November 14–16, 1957, at which 12 ruling communist parties signed a joint declaration.

The 1957 meeting occurred in the aftermath of the 20th Congress of the Communist Party of the Soviet Union, at which Joseph Stalin had been denounced, and revolts in Hungary and Poland. The 1957 meeting sought to reaffirm communist unity, demarcating against the revisionism represented by the Yugoslav party and the hardliners resisting "de-Stalinization". The meeting backed Khrushchev's new line of different national paths towards socialism, peaceful coexistence, and popular front tactics. As per the line given by the meeting, transition to people's democracy was possible through parliamentary elections, as long as the communist parties combined electoral work with mass struggles against reactionary forces. The meeting adopted a 'peace manifesto', outlining capitalist monopolies as the main threat to world peace.

== Unity and division ==
Whilst the intended purpose of the meeting was to display unity of the world communist movement, the outcome was quite different. In the debates at the meeting Mao Zedong argued for a centralized world communist movement whilst the Italian communist leader Palmiro Togliatti argued for decentralization of the world communist movement and autonomy of individual parties. For Mao, the talk of "peaceful road to socialism" meant a negotiation of revolutionary politics and a capitulation to electoral politics.

The meeting had lasting impact on the world communist movement. With the Moscow meeting indicating an increased space for independent policy by national communist parties, the Workers' Party of Korea organ Rodong Sinmun carried an editorial on the meeting which called for increasingly independent political self-reliance of the Workers' Party of Korea. Following the 1957 meeting, the Romanian Communist Party took an increasingly independent political course.

== Sino-Soviet split ==
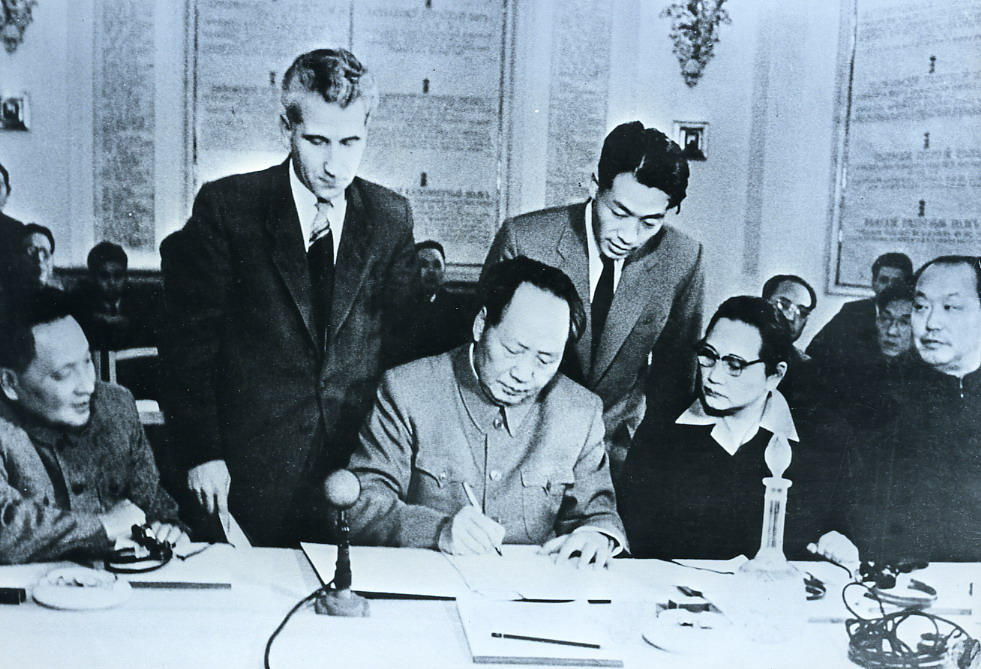
Mao Zedong, Deng Xiaoping, and Soong Ching-ling at the 1957 Moscow conference.

The 1957 meeting marked a turning point in Sino-Soviet relations, for the first time the contradictions between the Soviet and Chinese parties came into the forefront (which would later result in the Sino-Soviet split).

Whilst the meeting marked increasing divergence between the Soviet and Chinese communist parties, the Chinese Communist Party signed both the declaration and peace manifesto after some hesitation. Mao Zedong addressed the meeting on November 18, 1957, at which he publicly affirmed support for Khrushchev's leadership in his struggle against the "Anti-Party Group". The speech, released in full by Chinese authorities only in 1985, marks the sole known statement of Mao siding with Khrushchev against the "Anti-Party Group".

Moreover, Mao took advantage of the Moscow meeting to improve Sino-North Korean relations, by holding bilateral talks with the Korean leader Kim Il Sung and expressing remorse over Chinese interference in Korean affairs in 1956. In his speech at the meeting, Kim Il Sung avoided touching on the Sino-Soviet contradictions.

== Yugoslav question ==
On the other hand, the meeting was preceded by a few months of gradual normalization of relations between the Soviet Union and Yugoslavia, and the Yugoslav party was invited to the event. The Yugoslavs rejected the invitation for the preceding meeting of Communist and Workers Parties from the Socialist Countries but attended the broader international meeting. However, the rapprochement backfired as the Yugoslav delegates rejected the political line of recognizing the leading role of the Soviet Union in the struggle for socialism, and the Yugoslavs refused to sign the documents of the meeting. Just a few days before the event, when the Yugoslavs obtained the draft text for the declaration of the meeting, Tito cancelled his trip to Moscow altogether. The Chinese Communist Party had managed pushed the Soviets to adopt a tougher stand against Yugoslav revisionism, and at the Moscow meeting Mao was supported by Maurice Thorez and Mikhail Suslov on this point. The Albanian leader Enver Hoxha had published a statement on October 26, 1957, condemning the Yugoslav positions, causing dismay in the Yugoslav leadership. Meanwhile, the Polish communist leader Władysław Gomułka had unsuccessfully lobbied to exclude the wording 'with the Soviet Union at the fore' from the declaration of the meeting. The Italian delegation had been supportive of the Polish position on this matter, whilst the Danish communist leader Aksel Larsen voiced pro-Yugoslav positions (for which he was subsequently expelled from his party).

Officially Tito's absence at the October Revolution celebrations was explained by a sudden case of "lumbago". The fallout marked a setback for Khrushchev, who had hoped to be able to gather both Mao and Tito (representing opposite extremes of the increasingly divergent world communist movement) in a show of grand unity at the podium.

== Latin American meeting ==
During the Moscow meeting, a separate meeting of Latin American communists was held. The meeting set up a special commission for Latin American affairs. The Popular Front line of the Chilean communists was based on input from this meeting.

== Delegations ==
=== Present for both the Conference of Representatives of Communist and Workers' Parties of Socialist Countries and the International Meeting of Communist and Workers Parties ===
- Party of Labour of Albania, delegation headed by Enver Hoxha.
- Bulgarian Communist Party, delegation headed by Todor Zhivkov.
- Communist Party of Czechoslovakia, delegation headed by Antonín Novotný.
- Chinese Communist Party, delegation headed by Mao Zedong. The delegation also included Deng Xiaoping.
- Socialist Unity Party of Germany, delegation headed by Walter Ulbricht. The delegation also included the German Democratic Republic Prime Minister Otto Grotewohl.
- Hungarian Socialist Workers' Party, delegation was led by János Kádár.
- Workers' Party of Korea, delegation headed by Kim Il Sung.
- Mongolian People's Revolutionary Party, delegation headed by Dashiin Damba. Yumjaagiin Tsedenbal was also part of the delegation, but did not get a space on the podium during the October Revolution anniversary celebration.
- Polish United Workers' Party, delegation headed by Władysław Gomułka.
- Romanian Workers Party, delegation led by Gheorghe Gheorghiu-Dej. Nicolae Ceaușescu was also part of the delegation.
- Communist Party of the Soviet Union, delegation headed by Nikita Khrushchev.
- Workers Party of Vietnam, delegation led by Ho Chi Minh. He was accompanied by Lê Duẩn and Phạm Hùng. Phạm Hùng left the meeting on November 17, to attend the funeral of the President of Czechoslovakia Antonín Zápotocký.

=== Present only at the International Meeting of Communist and Workers Parties ===
- Algerian Communist Party
- Communist Party of Argentina, delegation headed by Victorio Codovilla.
- Communist Party of Australia
- Communist Party of Austria
- Communist Party of Belgium
- Communist Party of Bolivia
- Communist Party of Brazil
- Communist Party of Canada
- Communist Party of Ceylon
- Communist Party of Chile
- Colombian Communist Party
- People's Vanguard Party of Costa Rica
- People's Socialist Party of Cuba
- Communist Party of Denmark, delegation headed by Aksel Larsen.
- People's Socialist Party of the Dominican Republic
- Communist Party of Ecuador
- Communist Party of Finland, delegation headed by Ville Pessi.
- French Communist Party, delegation led by Maurice Thorez.
- Communist Party of Germany
- Communist Party of Great Britain, delegation headed by Harry Pollitt.
- Communist Party of Greece
- Guatemalan Party of Labour
- Communist Party of Honduras
- Communist Party of India
- Communist Party of Indonesia, delegation headed by Sudisman.
- Iraqi Communist Party
- Communist Party of Israel, represented by Moshe Sneh and Tawfik Toubi.
- Italian Communist Party, delegation headed by Palmiro Togliatti.
- Communist Party of Japan, represented by Yoshio Shiga and Korehito Kurahara.
- Jordanian Communist Party
- Communist Party of Luxembourg
- Communist Party of Malaya, represented by Siu Cheong and Musa Ahmad.
- Mexican Communist Party
- Moroccan Communist Party
- Communist Party of the Netherlands, delegation headed by Paul de Groot.
- Communist Party of New Zealand, represented by Alec Ostler.
- Communist Party of Norway
- People's Party of Panama
- Paraguayan Communist Party
- Peruvian Communist Party
- Portuguese Communist Party
- Sammarinese Communist Party
- Communist Party of Spain
- Communist Party of Sweden, delegation headed by Hilding Hagberg.
- Swiss Party of Labour
- Syrian–Lebanese Communist Party
- Communist Party of Thailand
- Tunisian Communist Party
- Communist Party of Turkey
- Communist Party of Uruguay
- Communist Party of Venezuela
- League of Communists of Yugoslavia, delegation led by Edvard Kardelj and Aleksandar Ranković.

Following the departure of John Gates from the Communist Party USA, the CPUSA subsequently endorsed the declarations of the 1957 meeting.

== See also ==
- Sino-Soviet split
- Soviet–Albanian split
- Tito-Stalin split
- 1960 International Meeting of Communist and Workers Parties
