= Gjergj Bubani =

Albanian publicist, writer, and translator (1899–1954)

Gjergj D. Bubani
- Born: January 20, 1899; Boboshticë, Kaza of Görice, Ottoman Empire
- Died: February 28, 1954 (aged 55); Tirana, Albania
- Occupations: Publicist, writer, translator
- Children: Dionis Bubani; Loredan Bubani
- Writing career
- Pen name: Brumbulli; Guri Malësori
- Language: Albanian, Romanian, French
- Years active: 1919-1943
- Genres: Satire, Nationalistic

Gjergj Bubani (January 20, 1899 – February 28, 1954) was an Albanian publicist, writer, and translator. He is also known as Jorgji Bubani, or Brumbulli (the beetle) which was his pen-name for his satiric articles.

Bubani was born in Boboshticë, a village near Korçë, today's Albania. He attended the French Lycee in Korçë, and then went to Athens where he attended the Industrial College. Bubani studied there chemistry. After the studies he moved to Romania, where at the time there was a large and active Albanian community (see: Albanians in Romania).
His publicistics started in 1919, with some articles for the newspaper Kuvendi (Convent) in Italy. In Romania, Bubani worked for the Albanian newspaper Shqiperi' e Re (New Albania) from 1920 to 1922 (started initially in Bucharest and from July 1920 moved to Costanza by Albanian activist Ilo Mitkë Qafëzezi). After that, Bubani published his own journals: Dodona (named after the ancient oracle) in January 1922, the short-lived Zëri Shqipëtar (The Albanian Voice) in March 1926, and Kosova (Kosovo), with a nationalistic orientation, with 33 issues from 1932 to 1933 in Albanian, Romanian, and French. His first satirical work appeared in the Dodona newspaper.
He also worked as a secretary in the Albanian consulate in Costanza, and later in Sofia.
Bubani was also a translator from Russian and Romanian. A great contribute consists of the translation of works from Victor Eftimiu, Romanian dramaturg originating from the same village (Boboshticë) as Bubani.

Zoi Xoxe, an Albanian publicist and pro-monarchist, invited Bubani to move back to Albania in 1936. Bubani moved his family to Tirana and started as chief-editor of Drita (The light). He would later become the Director of Radio Tirana which started to broadcast on 28 November 1938. During 1943 (Italian invasion) he was member of the Italo-Albanian literary society. During the German occupation, he worked for the Ministry of Culture.

Bubani was abducted by the Communists from his home in Fortuzi Street in Tirana on November 13, 1944, thus few days after Tirana's liberation by the partisans of National Liberation Front. He was accused of being a collaborator with the Italian and German occupators. He would remain in prison until 27 January 1945, when he was brought into the Special Court (Albanian: Gjyqi special) together with many other well-known former politicians, military figures, Balli Kombetar leaders, publicists, clerics, etc., including Fejzi Alizoti, Kostaq Kotta, Terenzio Tocci, Gustav von Myrdacz, Ibrahim Biçakçiu, Mihal Zallari, Javer Hurshiti, Beqir Valteri, Zef Kadarja, Kolë Tromara, Bahri Omari, etc.
Koçi Xoxe was leading the court sessions, while Bedri Spahiu was the prosecutor. Though the three witnesses testified that Bubani was an early sympathizer of the Liberation Movement, he was sentenced to 15 years. He was sent to forced work in the draining projects near Maliq. Physically exhausted and frustrated, he was released 5 years later. He did not engage in anything after, until his death in 1954.

== Bibliography ==
- Gjergj Bubani, i harruari i përkohshëm : ese monografike, Kliton Nesturi, Tirana: Omsca-1, 2010. ISBN 9789994341795
- Vepra e zgjedhur I, Tirana: Omsca-1, 2007. ISBN 9789994341009
- Vepra e zgjedhur II, Tirana: Omsca-1, 2007. ISBN 9789994341016
