= Special Court of Albania, 1945 =

Special court in Socialist Albania

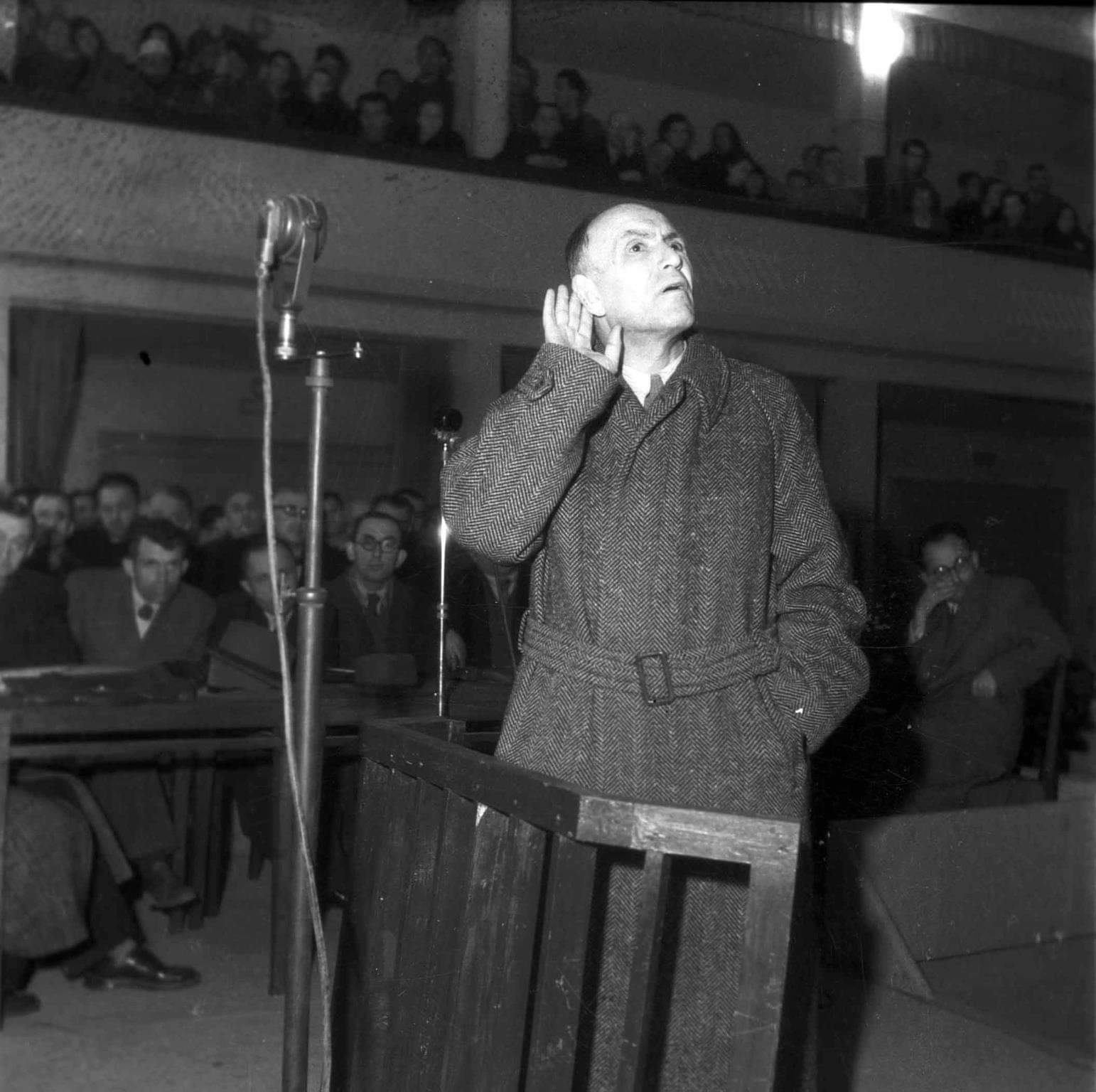
Bahri Omari standing trial

The Special Court for War Criminals and Enemies of the People (Albanian: Gjyqi Special për Kriminelët e Luftës dhe Armiqtë e Popullit), usually referred only as The Special Court (Albanian: Gjyqi Special), was a Socialist court set up during the spring of 1945 (1 March – 13 April) in the newly established Socialist Albania, which carried on the trial against those labeled as "people's enemies" and "war criminals". It was based on a decision taken by the Anti-Fascist Council of National Liberation on 25 December 1944. Like the rest of the Eastern Europe, the purge against fascists and war criminals became a central part of the construction of society based on the Soviet model.

== Background ==
In November 1944, the socialist partisans (LANÇ) took power and began immediately with the arrest of all public figures who were perceived to have collaborated with the occupiers or not to have supported the LANÇ before. The Bashkimi newspaper of the Democratic Front of Albania had already been coming out in early January 1945 with agitative editorials pointing to "traitors" and "people's enemies". Sixty of these public figures were the object a treason trial in March 1945 at a socialist Special Court with Prosecutor Koçi Xoxe. Xoxe, Minister of Interior, was considered from some as the most powerful person in Albania for the moment.

== Proceedings ==
Various non-Socialist/non-Communists politicians were object of the court: Pro-Italians, Nazi collaborationists, Balli Kombetar members, previous Ministers, anti-Communist figures, military personnel, King Zog supporters, former publishers and journalists, and members of public administration during the Italian and German regime.
"People's Tribunals" had been taking place since December 1944, but the most notorious was the Special Court of Tirana. The Special Court started in Tirana on 1 March 1945, and lasted until April 13 1945. The sessions took place in the premises of former "Savoja" cinema (renamed later to "Kosova" cinema, today's Albanian National Theater building). During this time it held 31 session and trialed 60 persons. General Lieutenant Koçi Xoxe was the leading judge, while General Major Bedri Spahiu was the prosecutor. The jury had 9 members, others were Beqir Balluku, Medar Shtylla (Minister of Economy), Faik Shehu, Halim Budo, Gaqo Floqi, Hysni Kapo, Bilbil Klosi, Gjon Banushi.

The defendants were:

- Koço Kota (politician, former prime minister)
- Bahri Omari (Vatra's activist, Balli leader, and Enver Hoxha's brother-in-law)
- Terenzio Tocci (former chairman of the Assembly)
- Tahsim Bishqemi (military officer)
- Ibrahim Biçaku (former prime minister)
- Fejzi Alizoti (pro-Italian politician, former prime minister)
- Anton Kozmaçi (politician, former prefect of Korçë)
- Xhevat Korça (historian, former minister)
- Qemal Vrioni (politician, former minister)
- Tefik Mborja (former diplomat, leader of the Albanian Fascist Party)
- Zef Benusi (politician, former minister)
- Shuk Gurakuqi (politician)
- Zef Shiroka (politician, former minister)
- Emin Toro (politician, vice-chairman of the Parliament)
- Aqif Përmeti (politician, former minister)
- Gustav von Myrdacz (division general of the Albanian Royal Army)
- Hilmi Leka (politician, former minister)
- Ndoc Naraçi (engineer, politician, former minister)
- Shyqyri Borshi (military figure and politician)
- Rrok Gera (economist, former minister)
- Reshit Merlika (politician)
- Javer Hurshiti (politician, former prefect)
- Beqir Valteri (politician, former minister, known for the attempt on King Zog's life)
- Zef Kadarja (politician)
- Kolë Tromara (politician, former prefect, former president of Vatra)
- Ismet Kryeziu (politician, former minister)
- Sokrat Dodbiba (economist, politician, former minister)
- Rrok Kolaj (former minister)
- Jakov Milaj (anthropologist, publicist, former minister)
- Refat Begolli (politician, former minister)
- Et'hem Cara (economist, former minister)
- Mihal Sherko (clerk, former minister, founder of the Albanian Telegraphic Agency)
- Akile Tasi (former minister)
- Mihal Zallari (nationalist, germanophile, former chairman of the Assembly)
- Xhavit Leskoviku (pro-Zogist, politician)
- Barjam Pustina (military officer)
- Sulejman Vuçitërna (military officer)
- Fiqri Llagami (journalist, editor of the "Shqipnia" newspaper)
- Dik Cami (military officer)
- Nedim Kokona (former general secretary of prime minister's Office)
- Sami Koka (military figure, former prefect)
- Daut Carçani (politician)
- Zenel Prodani (former prefect)
- Zija Bejleri (politician, clerk)
- Ihsan Libohova (director of "Tirana" newspaper)
- Koço Tasi (politician, former minister)
- Vangjel Goxhomani (politician)
- Luigj Filaj (composer, clerk)
- Abedin Xhiku (pro-Zogist, military figure)
- Lazër Radi (writer, journalist, lawyer, pro-Fascist)
- Manush Peshkëpija (publicist, anti-Communist)
- Gjergj Bubani (publicist, director of Radio Tirana)
- Bilal Nivica (military figure)
- Sami Visoka (politician, former minister)
- Mahmut Golemi (former prefect, Chief Commander of the Gendarmerie of Tirana)
- Abdurrahman Telqiu (politician)
- Rifat Tartari (politician)
- Ismail Golemi (military officer)
- Ded Jakova (photo-reporter?)
- Kostandin Kote (politician, former minister)

Most of the defendants were found guilty: 17 were executed by firing squad, 8 received life imprisonment, and the rest various prison terms. Abdurrahman Telqiu and Luigj Filaj were released due to lack of evidence. Ded Jakova, Zef Shiroka, and Abedin Xhiku were sentenced to 1, 2, and 1 year but were released on probation.

== Aftermath ==
With the demise of Koçi Xoxe in 1949, few political figures, including the ones which would be arrested and sentenced later, would get partially rehabilitated. Other notorious trials would come out during the socialist period in Albania, i.e. the "Assembly Members' Group" (Albanian: Grupi i Deputetëve), the "Sabotators' Group" (Albanian: Grupi i Sabotatorëve), "Coup d'Etat Group" (Albanian: Grupi i Puçistëve) and many more. Xoxe, Beqir Balluku, Bedri Spahiu would be later accused themselves of "treason" and "enemy of the people" and executed or imprisoned.

== See also ==
- Show trial
- Communism in Albania
- Albanian resistance during World War II
- Albania under Italy
- Albania under Nazi Germany
