= Bubani (surname) =

Bubani is a surname. Notable people with the surname include:

- Dionis Bubani (1926–2006), Albanian writer, playwright, humorist, and translator, son of Gjergj
- Gjergj Bubani (1899–1954), Albanian publicist, writer and translator
