= Democratic Government of Albania =

1944–1946 Albanian provisional government

- 37th Government of Albania
- 1944–1946
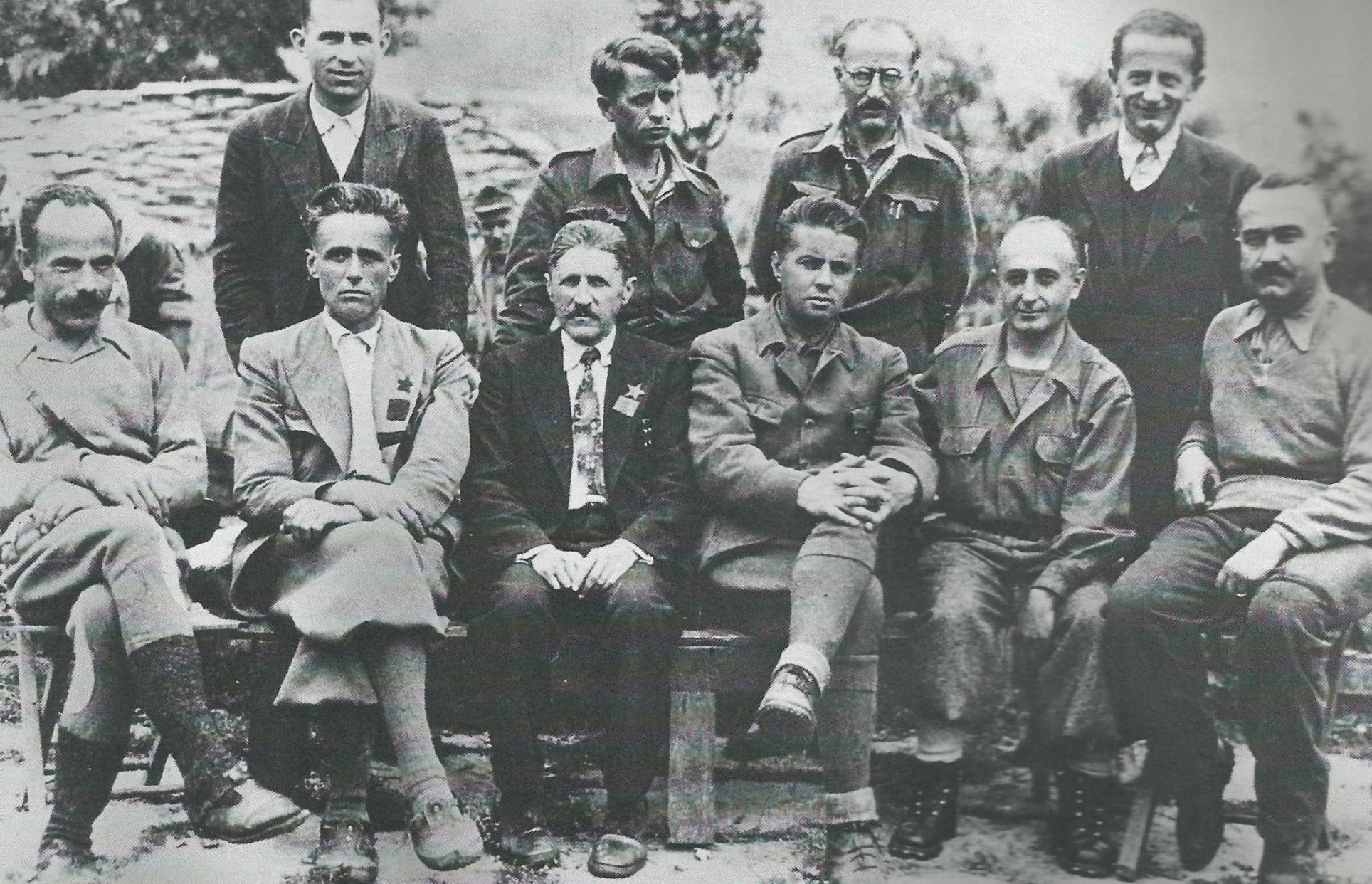
- Top Row: Manol Konomi, Bedri Spahiu, Spiro Koleka, Ymer Dishnica. Bottom Row: Ramadan Çitaku, Myslim Peza, Omer Nishani, Enver Hoxha, Sejfulla Malëshova, Medar Shtylla.
- Date formed: 20 October 1944
- Date dissolved: 10 January 1946

People and organisations
- Leader: Enver Hoxha
- No. of ministers: 15

History
- Predecessor: German occupation of Albania
- Successor: People's Republic of Albania

The Democratic Government of Albania (Albanian: Qeveria Demokratike e Shqipërisë) also known as the Hoxha I Government was established on 20 October 1944 by the National Liberation Movement, as the Albanian partisan resistance of 1940–1944 came to a close. A provisional government took power after the liberation of the country from German forces on 28 November. Its interim Prime Minister was Secretary-General Enver Hoxha of the Communist Party of Albania. The interim government was to be in existence until the holding of elections and the convening of a Constituent Assembly.

The government was led by the National Liberation Movement (LANÇ), which in turn was dominated by the Communist Party. From the outset, the Democratic Government was a Communist state. It sidelined the nationalist Balli Kombëtar, a task made somewhat easier by large amounts of British support. King Zog I was effectively dethroned; the Democratic Government barred him from ever returning to the country. The LANÇ quickly established fraternal relationships with other Communist countries.

Elections were held on 2 December 1945. By this time, the LANÇ had transformed itself into the Democratic Front of Albania, which was the only organization to contest the election. On 10 January 1946, the People's Republic of Albania was proclaimed.

== Cabinet ==
- Enver Hoxha - Prime Minister, Minister of Foreign Affairs and National Defense
- Koçi Xoxe - Deputy Prime Minister, Minister of Internal Affairs and Chairman of the Audit Committee
- Tuk Jakova - Minister Without Portfolio, 6 February 1946 Minister of Industry
- Haxhi Lleshi - Minister Without Portfolio
- Manol Konomi - Minister of Justice, 6 May 1947 - 5 February 1948 Minister Ad. Interim Education
- Spiro Koleka - Minister of World Affairs
- Ramadan Çitaku - Kiço Ngjela (6 February 1948) - Minister of Finances
- Nako Spiru - Minister of Economy, 13 March 1947 - President of the State Plan Committee
- Medar Shtylla - Minister of Health
- Gaqo Tashko - Minister of Agriculture
- Sejfulla Malëshova (Naxhije Dume, 6 February 1948) - Minister of Education
- Gogo Nushi (31 January 1947 - Minister of Commerce
- Nesti Kerenxhi - Minister Without Portfolio and President of the State Plan Commission (29 May 1948)
- Pandi Kristo - Minister Without Portfolio (1946) and Head of State Control (1947)
- Mehmet Shehu - Minister of Communications and PTT (6 February 1948)

== See also ==
- History of Albania
