= Soviet–Albanian Friendship Society =

The Soviet–Albanian Friendship Society (Albanian: Shoqëria e miqësisë Shqipëri-Bashkimi Sovjetik, Russian: Общество советско-албанской дружбы) was an organization established in 1945 to facilitate cultural cooperation between the Soviet Union and Albania. From its founding until the Soviet-Yugoslav split in 1948 it had only limited influence in the country due to Yugoslavia's control over Albania's foreign policy. After the split the society played an important role in promoting Soviet culture and norms in Albania through establishing courses for teaching Albanians the Russian language, introducing Soviet methods of work in industry and other fields, providing lectures, artistic performances and the distribution of Soviet materials and books in the Albanian language.

In August 1950 it had a membership of 50,000, which was raised to 154,000 by the next year. Tuk Jakova was president of the society, succeeded by Bedri Spahiu in June 1951 who was in turn succeeded by Hysni Kapo on August 15, 1955. The Society became inactive on the Albanian side as a result of the Soviet–Albanian split, but in the Soviet Union itself it was gradually made more active in the 1980s as the Soviet Government sought to reestablish diplomatic relations with Albania, which was achieved in 1990.
