= Dionis Bubani =

Albanian writer, playwright, humorist, and translator

- Born: September 18, 1926; Bucharest, Romania
- Died: February 10, 2006 (aged 79); Tirana, Albania
- Occupations: Chief-editor, writer
- Known for: Hosteni magazine Translations from Romanian
- Spouse: Afërdita Bubani
- Relatives: Gjergj Bubani (father)

Dionis Bubani (September 18, 1926 – February 10, 2006) was an Albanian writer, playwright, humorist, and translator. He is one of the first professional playwrights which emerged after World War II in Albania.

== Life ==
Dionis Bubani was born in Bucharest, Romania, on 18 September 1926, in former "Turk" street (renamed later "Tatra Mountains"). He finished his elementary and high school in Bucharest. Dionis was son of Gjergj Bubani, Albanian editor, publicist, and translator who had lived and worked in Romania for a long time. The family returned to Albania in 1936, where his father Gjergj would become chief-editor of Drita ("The light") newspaper and later Director of Radio Tirana.

After World War II, his father would be arrested and imprisoned by the notorious Special Court of Koci Xoxe. Dionis had a difficult period, being forced to take care of the family as well. He did simple jobs: bicycle-repairing, cigarette ambulant, also as a filer, or as a dactylographer for the Albanian Ministry of Foreign Affairs. During this time he had started writing. With the demise of Xoxe, some of the victims of the Special Court received partial rehabilitation. Dionis started collaborating for the journals and magazines Letrari i ri ("The new literary") and Rinia ("The youth"), while in 1946 he started publishing in Hosteni, the most known Albanian satirical magazine. There he became later chief-editor. He also collaborated with the "Estrada e Tiranës" ("Tirana's Comedy Theater).

Dionis studied philology in the University of Tirana. He had a long creative career where he contributed in publicistics, satire, humor, children literature, translations, and comedy writing. He received several titles in appreciation of his work. One of his works covers many Albanian Rilindas and literary figures which he had the chance of knowing personally. i.e. Çajupi, Asdreni, Mitrush Kuteli, Lasgush Poradeci, Skender Luarasi, Ismail Kadare, etc. In 2005 he published an autobiography.
Dionis Bubani died in Tirana, on 10 February 2006.

== Books ==
- Aventurat e Çapaçulit (The Adventures of Çapaçuli), book series
- Dardha e ka bishtin prapa (The bulb has its stalk behind)
- Yjet nuk shihen kurre (The stars are never seen)
- Çështje personale (Personal affairs)
- Pazar i mbare (Good business)
- Ujku te dentisti (The wolf at the dentist)
- Plumba dhe cianur (Bullet and cyanide)
- Një aventure në Tiranë (An adventure in Tirana)
- Papagalli në dogane (The parrot at customs)
- Vejusha gazmore (The merry widow)
- Biçikleta me tri rrota (The bicycle with three wheels)
- Shakatë tragjike të jetes sime (The tragic jokes of my life), autobiographical memories

== Translations ==
- "Poema", of Lasgush Poradeci
- "Cugetări" ("Musings") of Nicolae Iorga
- "The code of good manners" of Aurelia Marinescu
- "Selected tales from world's literature"

== See also ==
- Dritero Agolli
- Kristo Floqi
- Spiro Çomora
