= Battle of Drashovica =

WWII Albanian Resistance conflict

Coordinates: 40°26′49″N 19°34′52″E

- Part of Albanian Resistance of World War II
Date	September, 14 – October 4, 1943
Location	Drashovicë, Albania
Result	Albanian victory

Belligerents
LANÇ; Balli Kombëtar local volunteers	Germany

Commanders and leaders
Hysni Kapo	

Strength
c. 2,000	c. 3,500

Casualties and losses
Unknown	Over 3,000 killed About 7,000 Italian prisoners freed

The Battle of Drashovica (Albanian: Beteja e Drashovicës) was a battle of the Albanian Resistance of World War II against Nazi Germany. The battle took place in late 1943, in the areas of Drashovicë and Mavrovë in south-western Albania in the region of Shushicë.

== Prelude ==
After the occupation of the Albanian Kingdom by the Kingdom of Italy in 1939, several resistance groups were formed. The most important of these groups were Balli Kombëtar (BK), a nationalist organization formed by Mit'hat Frashëri and Ali Këlcyra and the Albanian National Liberation Front (ANLF), which later became a Communist group led by Mehmet Shehu and Enver Hoxha.

After the victorious battle of Gjorm and the establishment of German troops in Albania, many former Italian encampments became German bases, while many Italian soldiers were imprisoned for defection. In the Shushicë valley in the barracks of Drashovicë and Mavrovë the German army had imprisoned about 7,000 Italian soldiers guarded by about 3,500 soldiers.

== Battle ==
The two main leaders of the Albanian troops were Hysni Kapo, general commander of Vlorë area battalions of ANLF and Tasim Murati, commander of the Kaninë forces of BK. ANLF troops, composed of the Ismail Qemali and Halim Xhelo battalions were positioned along the Shushicë river, but their operative headquarters were located east of the river in the village of Kropisht. Balli Kombëtar units were positioned at Mazhar, Lapardha and Vodicë.

The battle began when artillery battery of ANLF assaulted the bridge of Drashovicë in order to slow down and cut off reinforcements. After the artillery assault ANLF and BK troops attacked the German troops. The battle lasted about twenty days and in the final stages of the battle the remaining German troops were forced to retreat inside the barracks of Drashovicë and Mavrovë. On October 4, 1943, the Albanian troops managed to storm the barracks and the prison. During the battle over 3,000 German soldiers died, over 200 of them inside the barracks of Drashovicë.
