= Ymer Dishnica =

Albanian politician and physician (1912–1998)

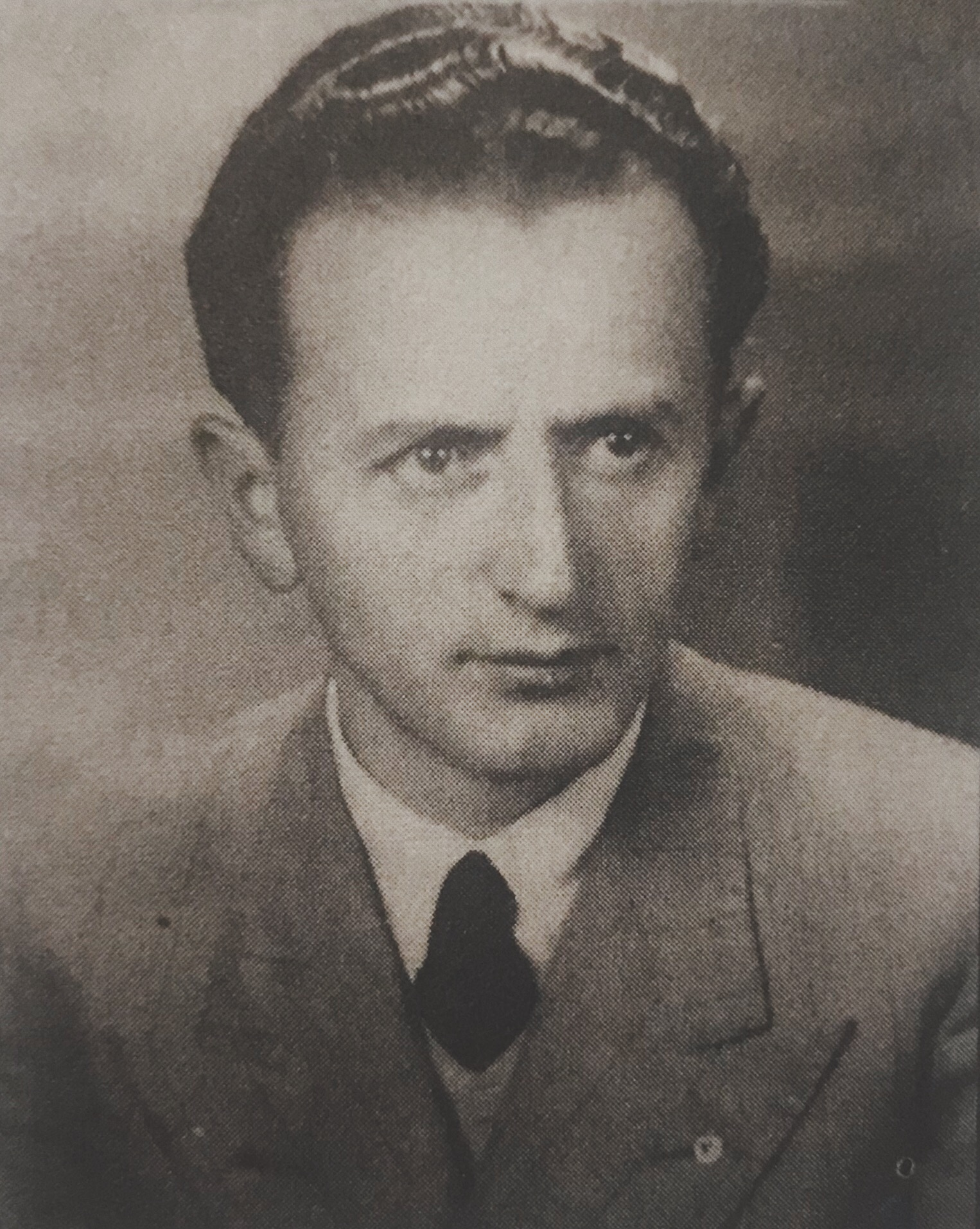

14th Speaker of the Parliament of Albania
- In office 1946–1947
- President: Omer Nishani
- Prime Minister: Enver Hoxha
- Preceded by: Tuk Jakova
- Succeeded by: Manush Myftiu

Minister of Health
- In office 23 October 1944 – 21 March 1946
- President: Omer Nishani
- Prime Minister: Enver Hoxha
- Preceded by: Office established
- Succeeded by: Medar Shtylla

Personal details
- Born: February 21, 1912 Dishnicë near Korçë, Manastir Vilayet, Ottoman Empire (Today Korçë County, Albania)
- Died: September 22, 1998 (aged 86) Tirana, Albania
- Party: Party of Labour of Albania

Ymer Dishnica (21 February 1912 – 22 September 1998) was an Albanian politician and physician. He served as Minister of Health from 1944 to 1946 and as Chairman of the Constituent Assembly from 1946 to 1947.

Ymer Dishnica was born in 1912 in Dishnicë village, 4 km away from Korçë. He took his elementary studies in Korçë, and after attended the Albanian National Lyceum which he finished in 1932. In 1932–1941 he studied medicine in France, respectively in the University of Lyon and after that the University of Paris.

Dishnica was active during World War II, by joining the National Liberation Movement forces. He was the head of the NLM delegation in the Conference of Mukje, negotiating an unified front with Balli Kombëtar, for which he would be criticized by Enver Hoxha. He was later expelled from the Party of Labour of Albania and served as a doctor in a hospital in Tirana.
