= Tuk Jakova =

Albanian politician (1914–1959)

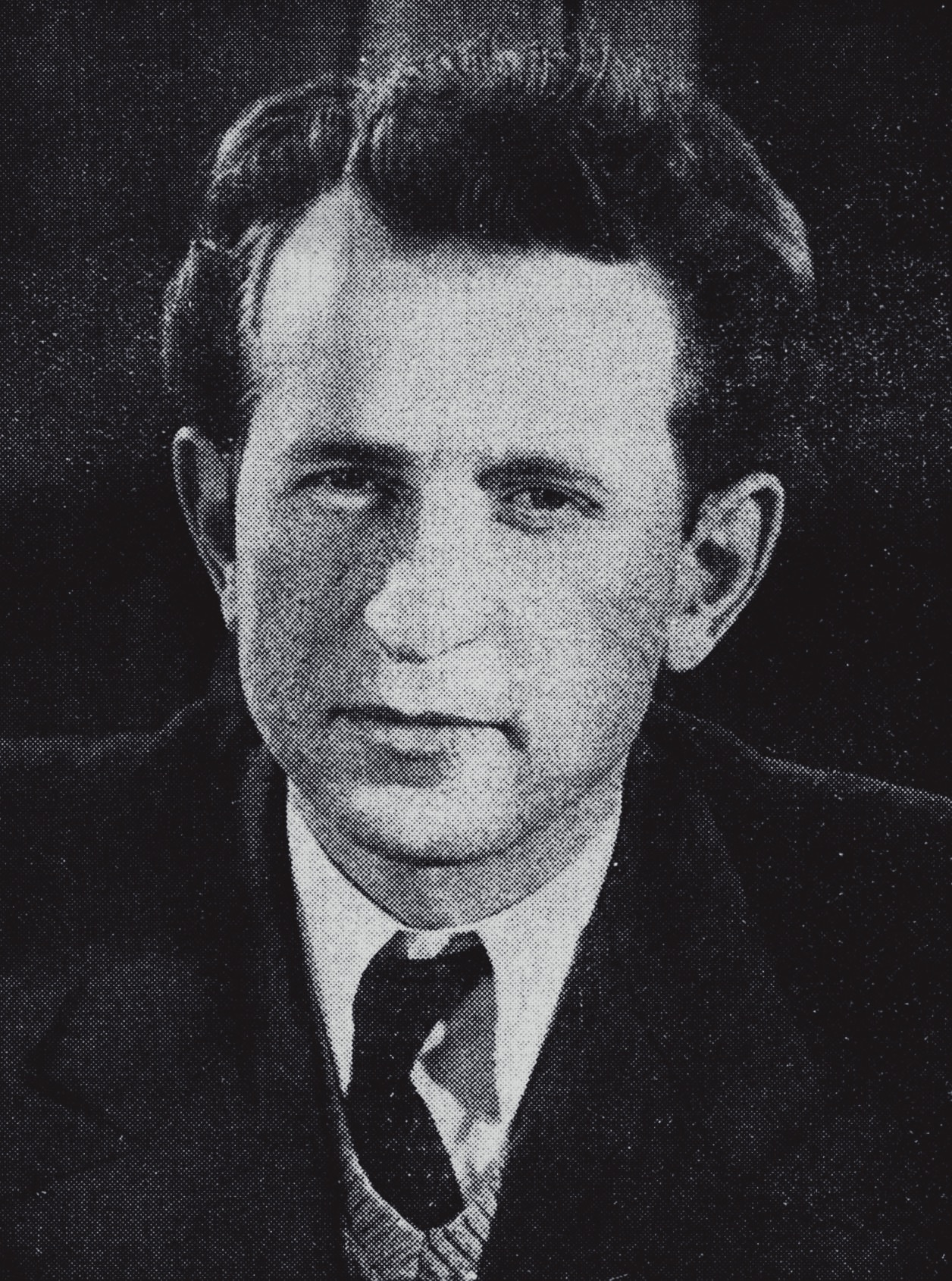

Vice-Prime Minister of the People's Republic of Albania
- In office 20 July 1954 – 24 June 1955 Serving with Manush Myftiu
- Prime Minister: Mehmet Shehu
- Succeeded by: Koço Theodhosi
- In office 4 July 1950 – 23 July 1953 Serving with Hysni Kapo, Spiro Koleka, Spiro Pano
- Prime Minister: Enver Hoxha

Minister of Finance of the People's Republic of Albania
- In office 23 July 1953 – 20 July 1954
- Prime Minister: Enver Hoxha
- Preceded by: Abdyl Këllezi
- Succeeded by: Abdyl Këllezi

Minister of Interior of the People's Republic of Albania
- In office 4 July 1950 – 23 July 1953
- Prime Minister: Enver Hoxha

13th Speaker of the Parliament of Albania
- In office 25 March 1946 – 1946
- Prime Minister: Enver Hoxha
- Preceded by: Omer Nishani
- Succeeded by: Ymer Dishnica

Personal details
- Born: 20 February 1914 Shkodër, Principality of Albania
- Died: 26 August 1959 (aged 45) Tirana, PR Albania
- Party: Party of Labour of Albania
- Portfolio: Minister of Industry, Chairman of the Constituent Assembly, Minister of Finance, Minister of Interior, and Vice-Prime Minister
- Awards: Hero of the People

Tuk Jakova (20 February 1914 – 26 August 1959) was an Albanian politician in the People's Republic of Albania. He served as Chairman of the Constituent Assembly, Minister of Finance, Minister of Interior, and twice as Vice-Prime Minister.

== Political career ==
In November 1941, Jakova attended the first and founding conference of the Party of Labor of Albania as a representative of the Shkodër group of Communists. Other members of the Shkodër group were Qemal Stafa and Liri Gega.

From March 25, 1946 until later that year, Jakova served as Chairman of the Constituent Assembly.

On 4 March 1947, Jakova arrived in Belgrade, Socialist Federal Republic of Yugoslavia to serve as minister to Yugoslavia. By 1 June 1948, Jakova was serving as Minister of Industry.

In the government reshuffle on 4 July 1950, Jakova was appointed Minister of the Interior and Vice-Prime Minister. Hysni Kapo, Spiro Koleka, and Spiro Pano also served as Vice-Prime Minister.

On 23 July 1953, in a joint meeting of the plenum of the Central Committee of the Party of Labor, the Albanian Council of Ministers, and the Presidium of the National Assembly, the government of Albania is restructured. During this meeting, Jakova was appointed the Minister of Finance.

On 20 July 1954, Jakova was re-appointed Vice-Prime Minister.

He was President of the Soviet–Albanian Friendship Society until 1951 and President of the General Council of the Syndicate Union of Albania from 1945 to 1947.

== Opposition to Enver Hoxha ==
In the mid-1950s, Jakova began to position himself in opposition to Enver Hoxha, then the Secretary of the Party of Labour of Albania. On 4 April 1955, during a private meeting in Rome, Jakova and Bedri Spahiu attacked Enver Hoxha's harsh rule over Albania. On 17 June 1955, during the Fourteenth Plenum of the Central Committee of the Albanian Communist Party, Jakova and Bedri Spahiu publicly voiced strong opposition to Enver Hoxha, creating a fight within the Party. Hoxha replied by accusing Jakova of being connected to the Roman Catholic church. The Fourteenth Plenum ended with the passing of a motion to expel Jakova from the Central Committee and remove him from his government position.

On 24 June 1955, Jakova was replaced in his role as Vice-Prime Minister by Koço Theodhosi. He was subsequently arrested and sentenced to 25 years in jail. He later died in the custody of political police.

The purge of Jakova was endorsed by the members of the Party of Labour of Albania at the Third Congress of the Party, which occurred from 25 May to 3 June 1956.
