= Miro Tërbaçe =

Miro Kosta Strati or more commonly known as "Miro Tërbaçe" was a semi-legendary Albanian hero who slew the local Sanjak of Avlona out of revenge for the death of her brother.

== The Legend ==
According to accounts, Miro Strati was born in the village of Tërbaç, Albania in the middle 1700s. Her father Kostë Strati was allegedly murdered secretly by Ottoman spies. While her brother Skëndo was murdered by the Turkish authorities. Thus, the woman swore to get revenge, and rode to Vlorë under the guise of a man. She did not find the Sanjak there, and instead ventured north to Mallakastër, where the Sanjak had his mansion. The guards were able to open the gates to let her in, and she murdered the Sanjak in 1764. After which, she swiftly returned to Labëria.

Villagers in the local area still sing her ballad:

E shkreta Miro Tërbaçe,

Moj e rritura bonjake,

me lakëra burdullake.

nëpër dyer të Tërbaçe;

Ike, te berberi vajte:

“O berber, ore vëllamë,

premi çepetë si djalë,

se do vë dyfek e kamë,

do marr hakë për babanë,

për baban’ e për vëllanë!

dhe për kushurin’ e parë,

për të gjithë shqipëtarë.

Qëllove mbi pashallarë,

Tërbaçit se ç’i le namë!…

== See also ==
- Tërbaç
- List of wartime cross-dressers
- Albanian mythology
- Gjakmarrja
