= Kosova (1932 newspaper) =

Albanian nationalist newspaper

- Type: Bimonthly
- Founder: Gjergj Bubani
- Publisher: Ioan Mihail Lehova (Jani Mihal Lehova)
- Managing editor: Gjergj Bubani
- Founded: 25 May 1932
- Ceased publication: 11 July 1933
- Political alignment: Albanian National Cause
- Language: Albanian, Romanian, French
- City: Constanța
- Country: Romania

Kosova ("Kosovo") was an Albanian Nationalistic political newspaper published in Constanța, Romania, during 1932–1933.

== History ==
The newspaper started on 25 May 1932 in Constanța directed by Gjergj Bubani, an Albanian native of Korçë who had emigrated to Romania in 1920. It was printed in the "Albania" printing house (1912–1948) of Constanța, owned by Mihail Xoxe, an Albanian publicist and activist from Negovan. The standard issue consisted of 4 pages in Albanian, Romanian, and French. Beside Bubani, other contributors were Dhimiter Pasko, Ali Asllani, Kristo Luarasi, M.Pogaçe, Selami Çela, all using pen-names.
In 1933, the satirical-literary supplement Brumbulli (Dung beetle) was added to it. One issue of 1933 appears of 16 pages, and one of 18. The last issue dates 11 July 1933.

== Political statement ==
The political mission of the newspaper as written on its front page:

1. The right of self-determination for the occupied regions (Kosovo-Chameria).
2. An autonomous Macedonia (region), Canton-based, with all political features of Switzerland, where Albanian-Macedonians, Aromanian-Macedonians, Bulgarian-Macedonians, Turk-Macedonians, and Greek-Macedonians have their free cantons.
3. Consolidation of our (Albania) independence, radicalization of social reforms, and crystallization of the constitutional rights.
4. Close by cooperation between three pillars of the Albanian nation, which are the Albanians of free Albania, the Albanians of occupied Albania, and the colonies.
