= Aqif Përmeti =

Albanian military officer and politician

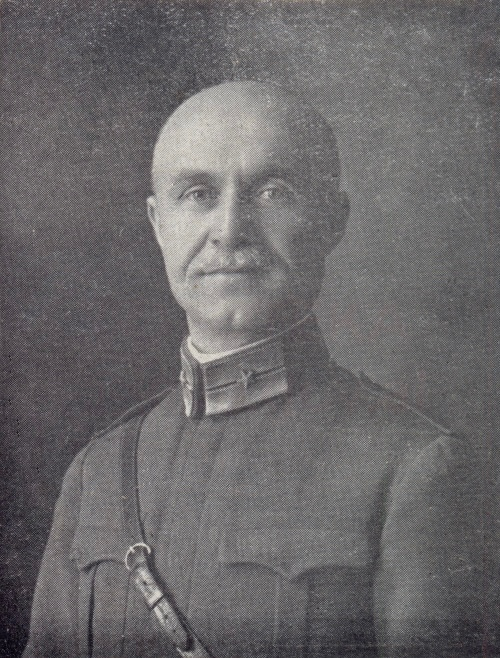

Minister of Defence of Albania
- In office 12 April 1939 – 28 April 1943
- Monarch: Vittorio Emanuele III
- Prime Minister: Shefqet Vërlaci; Mustafa Merlika-Kruja; Eqrem Libohova; Maliq Bushati
- Preceded by: Xhemal Aranitasi
- Succeeded by: Prenk Pervizi

Personal details
- Born: 28 November 1884 Përmet, Janina Vilayet, Ottoman Empire
- Died: 14 April 1945 (aged 60) Tirana, Albania
- Occupation: Military officer, politician

Aqif Përmeti (28 November 1884 – 14 April 1945) was an Albanian military officer and politician. He served as Minister of Defence during the Italian occupation of Albania. In 1944 he was arrested by the communist regime and a year later was sentenced to death and executed on April 14 in Tirana.

== Biography ==
Përmeti was born in around 1884 in Përmet, then a part of the Janina Vilayet of Ottoman Empire. He attended a military academy in Istanbul. In 1915, Përmeti moved to the United States. Later, Përmeti returned to Europe to command an Albanian-American battalion of the United States Army.

In 1920, Përmeti returned to Albania to support the recently created Delvina Government. Përmeti then joined the Albanian military and served as a commander in southern Albania. In 1924, he served as the commander of the Tirana gendarmerie. That same year, following the rise of Ahmet Zogu, he fled Albania with Fan S. Noli but later returned. After reconciling with Zogu, Përmeti was given a command in Shkodër. In 1929, he organized a military publishing house. In 1934, Përmeti worked for the Albanian Ministry of Education.

Përmeti's service in the military continued through the Italian invasion of Albania. He was eventually appointed to be the Minister of Defense for the Italian Protectorate of Albania, serving from 12 April 1939 to 28 April 1943. On 5 March 1943, he was promoted to general by Renzo Dalmazzo.

In April 1945, Përmeti was sentenced to death by the communist Special Court for War Criminals and Enemies of the People. He was executed on 14 April 1945.
