= Tërbaç =

- Village
- Location within Albania
- Coordinates: 40°14′N 19°38′E
- Country: Albania
- County: Vlorë
- Municipality: Himarë
- Administrative unit: Horë-Vranisht
- Time zone: UTC+1 (CET)
  - Summer (DST): UTC+2 (CEST)

Tërbaç is a village in the Himarë municipality, southwestern Albania.

== History ==
Tërbaç was part of the battlefield of the battle of Gjorm, where Albanian resistance units defeated and routed the troops of the Kingdom of Italy. During World War II the German army was still very active in the area, even as the allies pushed up into northern Italy. Meanwhile, Partisans also were fighting against the Germans and Balli Kombëtar.

== Notable people ==
- Hysni Kapo (1915–1979), Albanian military commander and leading member of the Party of Labour of Albania.
- Miro Kosta Strati or more commonly known as "Miro Tërbaçe" was a semi-legendary Albanian hero.
