= Hosteni =

Hosteni (The Goad) is a satire magazine, published in Albania.

== History and profile ==
Founded in 1945, during communist Albania, it is said that it was named Hosteni by Nako Spiru, a young communist politician, then general secretary of the Labour Youth Union of Albania. It was the only satire magazine in the country. Its long-term director was Niko Nikolla, followed in 2010 by Pëllumb Vreka. The magazine was issued monthly and was very loved by its readers in its heyday (1960s and 1970s), when it sold up to 30 thousand copies. As of 2010, it was issued only 4 times a year for around 5-6 thousand copies. Writers such as Dritero Agolli, Sabri Godo, Spiro Çomora, Dionis Bubani, Qamil Buxheli, and Petro Marko have written in the magazine, whereas notable caricaturists, such as Zef Bumçi, Ilir Pojani, Bardhyl Fico, Dhimitër Ligori, Sabaudin "Sabka" Xhaferi, Bujar Kapexhiu, Shtjefen Palushi, Spartak Nasi and Agim Sulaj have given their contributions to the graphics.

The headquarters of the magazine is in Tirana.

== See also ==
- List of magazines in Albania
