= Bahri Omari =

Albanian politician (1889–1945)

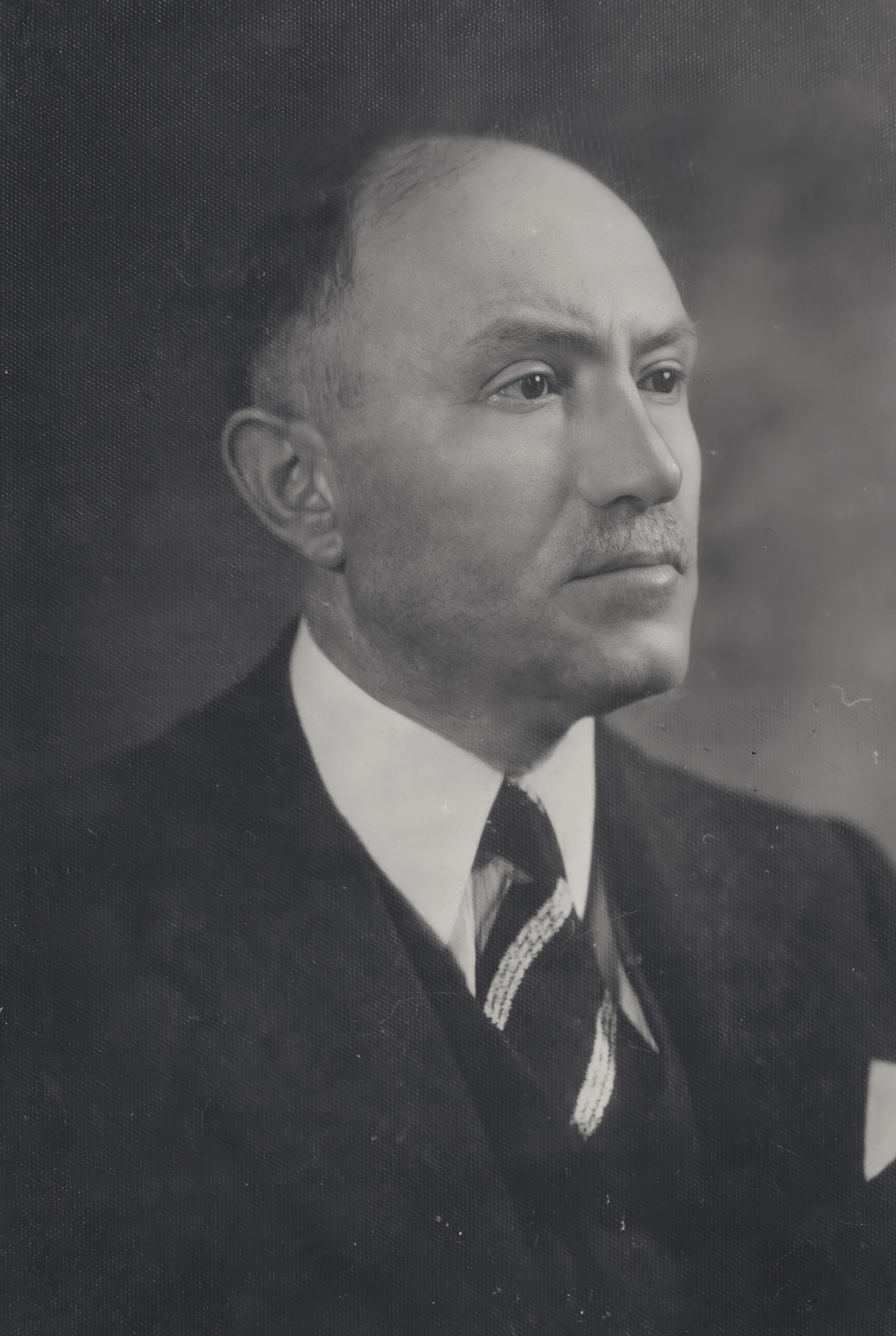

Minister of Foreign Affairs
- In office 6 February 1944 – 17 July 1944
- Prime Minister: Rexhep Mitrovica
- Preceded by: Eqrem Vlora
- Succeeded by: Mehmed Konica

Personal details
- Born: 10 February 1889 Gjirokastër, Janina Vilayet, Ottoman Empire
- Died: 14 April 1945 (aged 56) Tirana, Albania
- Cause of death: Execution by firing squad
- Party: Balli Kombëtar
- Spouse: Fahrije Omari (Hoxha)
- Relatives: Enver Hoxha's brother-in-law, executed by the same
- Education: Mülkiye-i-Sehahané, Istanbul

Bahri Omari (10 February 1889 – 14 April 1945) was an Albanian politician, publisher, and writer.

== Early life ==
Born on 10 February 1889, in the city of Gjirokastër, Janina Vilayet, Ottoman Empire (today the location is in Albania), he became at the age of 25 the prefect of Himarë, a coastal town in southern Albania and later fought against the Greek Army during the Greek Occupation of Albania.

== Career ==
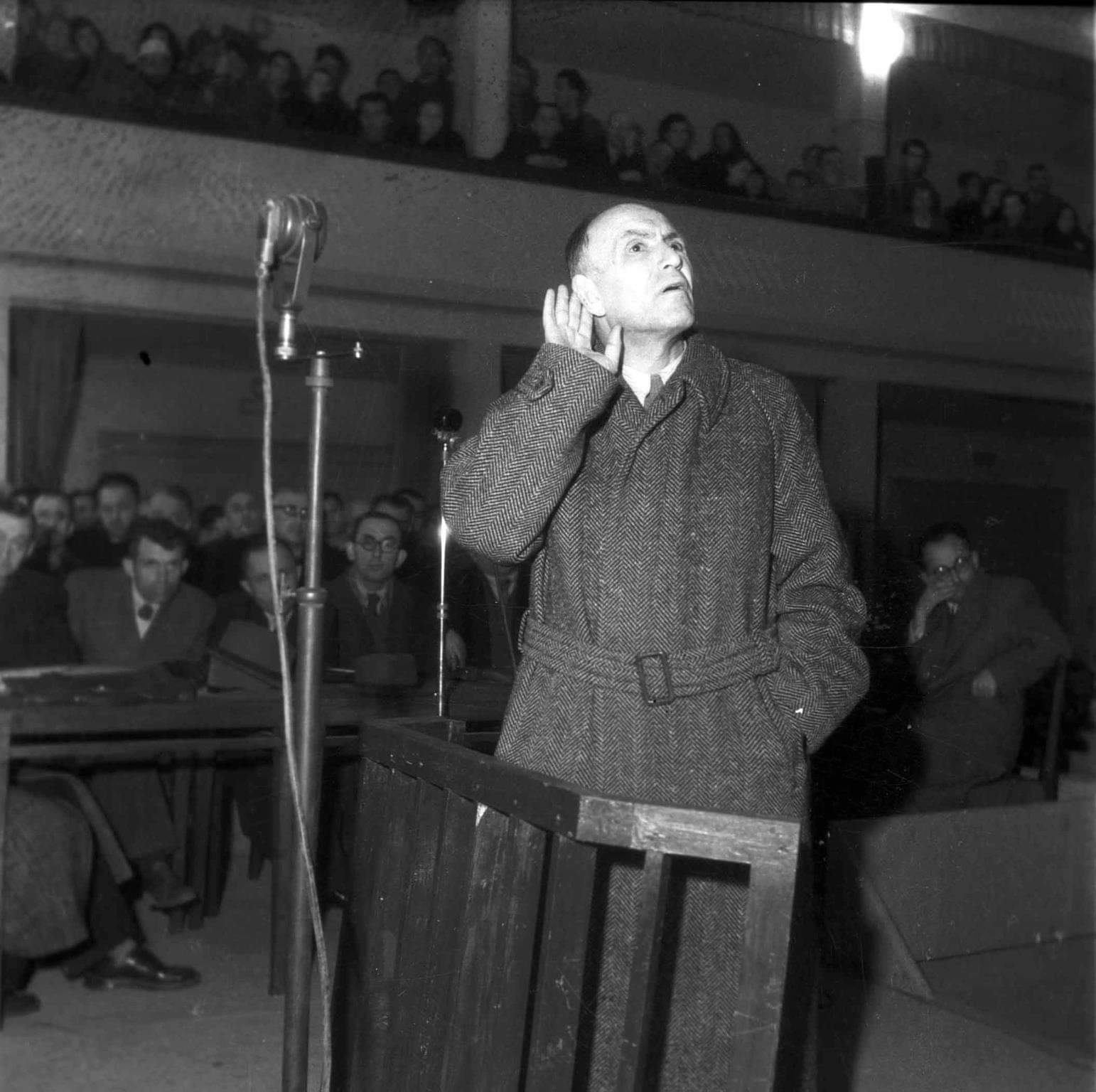
Bahri Omari standing trial at the Special Court in 1945

In 1914, Omari moved to the United States where he became editor of the Albanian language newspaper Dielli which was published by the Vatra Organization. He returned to Albania five years later and participated twice in the parliamentary elections of 1921 and 1923, representing the party of Mufid Libohova. In 1924, during Fan Noli's government, he was elected general secretary of the National Democrat Party and was in charge of its printed medium, "Shekulli".

After Noli's exile caused by Ahmet Zogu's coup d'état in December, 1924, Omari migrated to Italy and lived there until 1939. Following his return to Albania, in 1942 he became a member of the Balli Kombëtar movement. During the occupation of Albania by Nazi Germany, he was appointed Minister of Foreign Affairs. For holding this post, he was arrested and put on trial at the Special Court of 1945, organized by Koçi Xoxe and Enver Hoxha, his brother-in-law. He was executed by firing squad on April 14, 1945.

== See also ==
- Communism in Albania
- June Revolution
