= Spiro Çomora =

Albanian writer

Spiro Çomora (January 31, 1918 – April 16, 1973) was an Albanian playwright, famous mostly as a comedist (one who writes comedies). He is most known for the comedy "Korçë's Carnevals" (Karnavalet e Korçës), which premiered in 1961 and earned him national fame. Çomora also wrote children's poetry and distinguished himself as a translator, translating a selection of the Juvenal's Satires into Albanian.

== Biography ==
Spiro Çomora was born in Corfu, Greece, into a family hailing from Vuno, Himare.

He died at age 55.

== Career ==
Çomora's most famous comedy is Karnavalet e Korçës (Korçë's Carnivals) (1961).

Çomora also created poetry for children, as well as translated into Albanian works of Ancient Greece dramaturgs, such as The Odyssey of Homer and Lysistrata of Aristophanes. He is also known for his satirical articles in the magazine Hosteni.

== Honors and awards ==
Çomora was posthumously given the title Honor of Himara in 2012.

== Works ==
- Syfete
- Shkolla jonë (Our School)
- Nga fshati i gruas (From My Wife's Village)
- Syleshi (The Stupid)
- Skena e prapaskena (Stages and Backstage)
- Karnavalet e Korçës (Korçë's Carnivals)

=== Translations ===
- Homer. The Odyssey. (from Ancient Greek)
- Aristophanes. Lysistrata. (from Ancient Greek)
