= Albanian–Soviet split =

1956–1961 deterioration of bilateral relations

- Part of the Cold War and the Sino-Soviet split
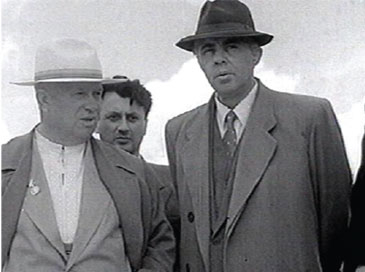
- Nikita Khrushchev with Enver Hoxha in 1959
- Date: 1956–1961
- Location: Albania, Soviet Union
- Caused by: De-Stalinization of the Soviet Union, anti-revisionism, and Hoxhaism

Parties
Albania: PPSh	Soviet Union: CPSU

Lead figures
Enver Hoxha; Mehmet Shehu	Nikita Khrushchev; Leonid Brezhnev

The Albanian–Soviet split (Russian: Албано-советский раскол, romanized: Albano-sovetskiy raskol; Albanian: Ndarja shqiptaro-sovjetike) was the gradual worsening of relations between the Union of Soviet Socialist Republics (USSR) and the People's Republic of Albania, which occurred in the 1956–1961 period as a result of Soviet leader Nikita Khrushchev's rapprochement with Yugoslavia along with his "Secret Speech" and subsequent de-Stalinization, including efforts to extend these policies into Albania as was occurring in other Eastern Bloc states at the time.

However, the Albanian–Soviet split did not become public until 1960, when, during the Bucharest Conference of Representatives of Communist and Workers Parties, the Albanian delegation, led by Hysni Kapo, did not support Khrushchev's ideological views on the Sino-Soviet split.

The Albanian leadership under Enver Hoxha perceived Khrushchev's policies as contrary to Marxist–Leninist doctrine and his denunciation of Joseph Stalin as an opportunistic act meant to legitimize revisionism within the international communist movement. Occurring within the context of the larger split between China and the USSR, the Soviet–Albanian split culminated in the termination of relations in 1961, however Albania did not withdraw from the Warsaw Pact until 1968, mainly as a reaction to the invasion of Czechoslovakia.

== Background ==
The Communist Party of Albania—known as the Party of Labour of Albania after 1948—was founded in November 1941 in the context of the foreign occupation of the country, with the majority of its members including its leader, Enver Hoxha, having no connection to the Comintern. Historian Jon Halliday commented "it was set up without any known direct contact with Moscow." Halliday argues that "middle-class intellectuals" with "Western intellectual traditions" were the most significant force behind the foundation of the Communist Party of Albania. Albania was also the only Eastern European country liberated from Axis occupation without the presence of the Red Army on its soil. A combination of these factors led Stalin to initially have been "both curious and suspicious about the only leader of a Communist regime in the Soviet bloc who escaped from any historical ties or contact with the Soviet Union." This, Halliday continues, "was true not just of Hoxha as an individual, but of almost the entire leading group in Albania." Despite this, however, for Halliday, Hoxha's cult of personality made him "the quintessential Stalinist". Halliday considers that many of the reasons used by Nikita Khrushchev to denounce Joseph Stalin, were applicable to Enver Hoxha.

Following Albania's liberation, the country's economic and foreign policies were dominated by its neighbour Yugoslavia under the leadership of Josip Broz Tito, and Albania became in the words of historian Miranda Vickers a "sub-satellite." During this period ties with the Soviet Union remained limited, though formal diplomatic relations were established in December 1945.

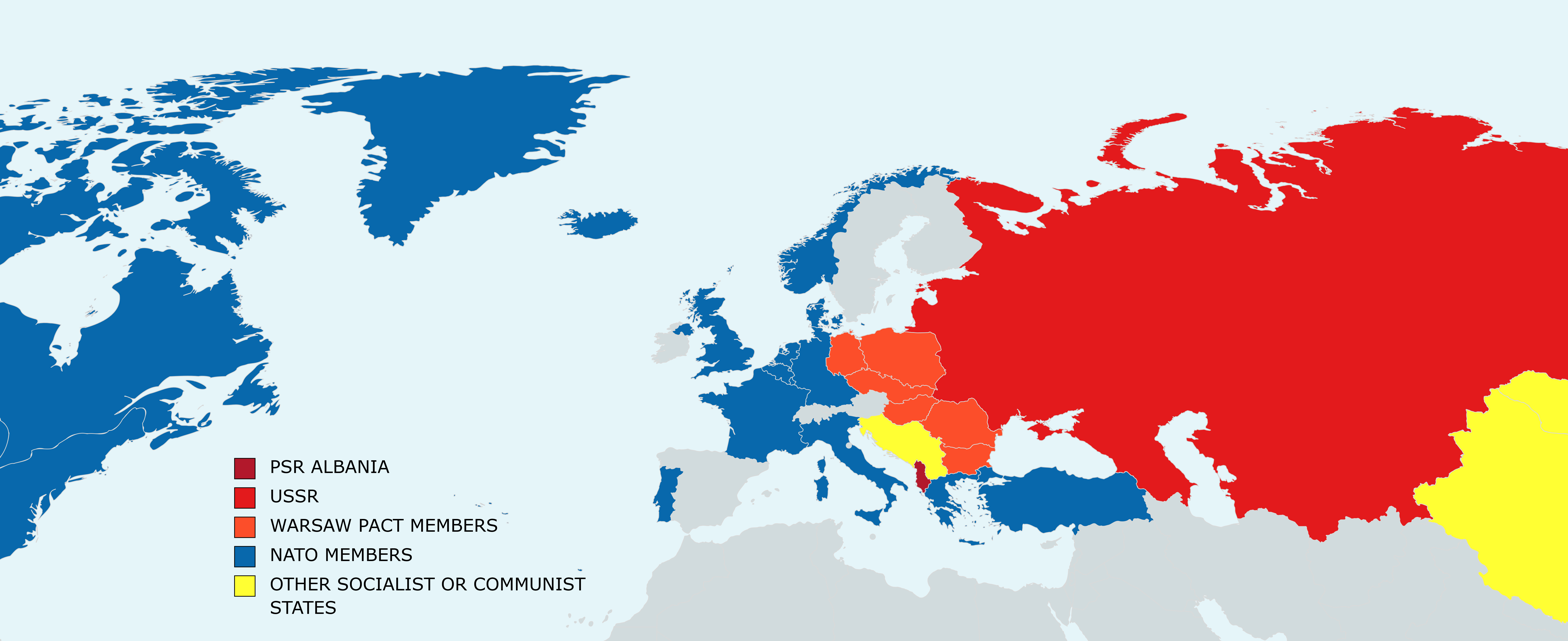
Geopolitical situation in 1956

=== Soviet–Yugoslav split ===
Within the leadership of the Communist Party of Albania tensions arose between pro– and anti–Yugoslav factions and personalities, with the latter increasingly coming under attack by Koçi Xoxe, the head of the pro–Yugoslav faction. Hoxha was threatened on the basis of his opposition to the pro–Yugoslav line, as Xoxe's final goal was to overthrow Hoxha and to incorporate Albania into Yugoslavia as its Seventh Republic. The Soviet–Yugoslav split in 1948, however, had allowed Albania to break from Yugoslav dominance, and it became the first state to side with the Information Bureau (better known in the West as the Cominform) with its resolution attacking the Yugoslav leadership for allegedly pursuing a road of nationalist deviation and capitalist restoration.

From that point onward, relations between Albania and the Soviet Union were relatively close until 5 March 1953, following the death of Stalin. In the words of historian Nicholas C. Pano, "by the beginning of 1949, Albania had progressed from the status of a sub-satellite to that of a full-fledged satellite of the Soviet Union." Albania became a member of Comecon in 1949, and joined the Warsaw Treaty upon its founding in 1955. In addition the Soviets built a submarine base at Vlora in 1952.

=== Death of Stalin ===
In his memoirs, Hoxha recounts the apprehension he and others had about the post-Stalin leadership, just days after Stalin's death. "The way in which the death of Stalin was announced and his funeral ceremony was organized created the impression ... that many members of the Presidium of the Central Committee of the Communist Party of the Soviet Union had been awaiting his death impatiently."

A meeting with Soviet leaders held in June that year further raised his suspicions about the intentions of the new leadership, as did a reduction in Soviet and Eastern Bloc aid to Albania in early-1954 as Soviet leader Nikita Khrushchev 'generally believed that the trade cost for the support of Albania did not generate enough return for Soviet interests and their strategic interests'. Reacting to early post-Stalin Soviet pressure on the East European countries to pursue economic and political reforms, Albania announced slight changes in planning priorities and some willingness to improve state relations with Yugoslavia as the Soviets were doing. There was also a reshuffling of political portfolios in line with the Soviet re-emphasis on the principle of collective leadership.

Hoxha regarded Soviet pressure as acting in the service of ulterior, revisionist aims in an effort to unseat or otherwise undermine "Stalinist" leaders. Thus in a meeting with Khrushchev on the issue of collective leadership, he recalled:

Khrushchev told us that the other sister parties had been told of the Soviet "experience" of who should be first secretary of the party and who prime minister in the countries of people's democracy. "We talked over these questions with the Polish comrades before the congress of their party," Khrushchev told us. "We thrashed matters out thoroughly and thought that Comrade Bierut should remain chairman of the Council of Ministers and Comrade Ochab should be appointed first secretary of the party ..." Hence, right from the start Khrushchev was for pushing Bierut aside in the leadership of the party ... [the Soviets] were giving the green light for all the revisionist elements, who, up till yesterday, were wriggling and keeping a low profile, awaiting the opportune moments. Now these moments were being created by Khrushchev who, with his actions, stands and "new ideas", was becoming the inspirer and organizer of "changes" and "reorganizations".

== Beginnings of the split ==
Per Jon Halliday, the relationship between Albania and the Soviet Union was observably good until the late 1950s. Differences in views emerged between the Soviet Union and Albania over Nikita Khrushchev's rapprochement with SFR Yugoslavia, the "revisionist" 20th Congress of the Communist Party of the Soviet Union in 1956, the anti-Stalin campaign, the Hungarian Revolution, and the rising Sino-Soviet dispute. In June 1954, Khrushchev sent a letter to the leaders of the parties of the Eastern Bloc in which the Cominform resolutions denouncing Yugoslavia in the 1948–1949 period were criticised for allegedly forcing Tito and the rest of the Yugoslav leadership "into the arms of the United States and Great Britain and had led to Yugoslavia's conclusion of a military pact with two NATO members." Hoxha, however, disagreed with this view, later writing, "even if the Yugoslav leadership had been unjustly condemned in 1949, as Khrushchev was claiming, nothing could permit or justify its falling into the lap of imperialism."

In May 1955, Khrushchev led a Soviet delegation to the Yugoslav capital of Belgrade with the aim of rehabilitating Tito, a move which encouraged reformist and dissident trends in Eastern Europe. The Albanian government had received a letter two days before the Soviet delegation was to leave Moscow. The Soviets requested the Albanians approve a statement drawn up by Khrushchev in the name of the Information Bureau even though he had not convened it. The move was refused by the Albanians 'with reasoning that the Yugoslav leadership had had no change since its condemnation in 1948 by the communist and workers' parties represented on the Bureau'.

On 25 May, the Central Committee of the Party of Labour sent a letter to its Soviet counterpart, stating among other things, "In our opinion such a hasty (and ill-considered) decision on an issue of great importance and of principle" was conducted "without first making a profound analysis together with all the parties interested in this issue." With only Albania among the Eastern Bloc states opposing Khrushchev's move, the Soviets succeeded in unilaterally rehabilitating Tito's standing within the international communist movement and apologized for past Soviet activities in relation to Yugoslavia.

=== 20th Congress of the Communist Party of the Soviet Union ===
At the 20th Congress of the Communist Party of the Soviet Union in February 1956, Khrushchev issued—in addition to his main report—his "Secret Speech" denouncing Stalin. In addition to its attack on Stalin, Hoxha later stated about the Congress that:

all the distortions of the major issues of principle, such as those about the character of our epoch, the roads of transition to socialism, peaceful coexistence, war and peace, the stand towards modern revisionism and towards imperialism, etc., etc., which later became the basis of the great, open polemic with modern revisionism, have their official beginning in Khrushchev's report to the 20th Congress ... we saw how the Khrushchevites, in order to consolidate their power, operated allegedly with "a great party spirit", "free from the fear of Stalin" ... Every good thing of the past was distorted, allegedly in light of the "new situations", "new developments", "new roads and possibilities", in order to go ahead.

A notable event at the Congress was the promotion of the policy of "peaceful coexistence" by Khrushchev, which officially was a policy to increase East–West collaboration against the threat of nuclear war, but which anti-revisionists believed to be a means to separate the world into influential provinces in which each side would occupy complete control. One anti-revisionist author described Khrushchev's policy as follows: "Khrushchev made it clear that he was prepared to give up international class struggle, renouncing on behalf of the colonial peoples any right to liberate themselves from oppression and reassuring capitalist governments by emphasising 'peaceful transition to socialism' or the Parliamentary road ..." He then quoted Khrushchev as saying "'if any mad man wanted war, we [the Soviet Union and the United States], the two strongest countries in the world, would have but to shake our fingers to warn him off.'"

=== Third Congress of the Party of Labour of Albania ===
One of Tito's preconditions for improving relations with the Soviets was for a Soviet-backed removal of "Stalinist" leaders in Eastern Europe, such as Mátyás Rákosi of Hungary and Valko Chervenkov of Bulgaria; Hoxha was also an obvious target for removal due to his intransigent position on Yugoslavia. The Soviets sought without success to force Hoxha to rehabilitate Koçi Xoxe. In April 1956, a party conference was held in Tirana: various delegates, inspired by Khrushchev's actions, attacked the line of the Party of Labour, calling for a review of the case of Xoxe along with other political and economic policies and phenomena. However, Hoxha entered the conference and managed to defeat these proposals. The Third Congress of the Party of Labour was convened a month later, electing a Central Committee and Politburo "composed of staunch Hoxha loyalists" while also demonstrating "Hoxha's first public defiance of the Soviet Union" by refusing to rehabilitate Xoxe and other persons linked with, or otherwise supportive of, rapprochement with Yugoslavia.

Although the Third Party Congress did not openly criticize the 20th Party Congress of the CPSU partly because "the real aims of [the Soviets] were still not fully recognized", and because of a perceived necessity to preserve the unity of the international communist movement, it did declare the line of the Party of Labour had been "followed [correctly] up to now", and thus tacitly rejected Khrushchev's de-Stalinization policies.

Following the Hungarian Uprising in November 1956, relations between Albania and the Soviet Union improved somewhat due to Yugoslavia's part in the event, which caused friction in Yugoslav–Soviet relations. On 7 November, Hoxha wrote an article for Pravda denouncing Tito for encouraging the activity of the rebels, though the Soviets rebuked Hoxha for his harsh tone soon after. Soviet efforts to improve relations with Yugoslavia resumed before long, prompting a further deterioration in Soviet–Albanian relations.

=== Plenum of 1957 ===
In a February 1957 speech to a plenum of the Central Committee of the Party subsequently published in the newspaper Zëri i Popullit, Hoxha defended Stalin's legacy and attacked the Yugoslavs – but not the Soviet leadership by name. He added that, "In blackening Stalin, the enemies are not concerned about him as a person, but their aim is to discredit the Soviet Union, the socialist system, and the international communist movement, consequently, to undermine the workers' faith in socialism."

As a result of the February plenum of 1957, which was seen as directly rebuffing many post-Stalin Soviet views, the Soviet leadership invited Hoxha to visit Moscow in April that year allegedly for consultations. Instead, Khrushchev called on Hoxha to rehabilitate and reinstate party members who had been sacked for their support of Yugoslavia and the theses of the 20th Party Congress; Hoxha refused. In response to this Khrushchev accused Hoxha of sectarianism and of being "hell-bent on pursuing Stalinist policies."

Hoxha later recalled the meeting as follows: Khrushchev advised the Albanians to improve their relations with Yugoslavia, to which Hoxha replied, "We have always wanted to have good relations with Yugoslavia, but to put it bluntly, we do not trust the Yugoslav leaders, because they speak against the social system in our countries and are opposed to the foundations of Marxism–Leninism. In all their propaganda, they do not say one word against imperialism, on the contrary, [they] have joined the chorus of the Western powers against us."

He once more said that the Yugoslav leadership failed to understand "any of its grave mistakes and deviations," to which Khrushchev replied that Yugoslavia did not betray Marxism–Leninism though it had "slipped" from its positions. "According to you," Khrushchev continued, "we ought to return to what Stalin did, which caused all these things we know about." The meeting became increasingly acrimonious and when the subject of rehabilitating disgraced Albanian politicians came up Khrushchev eventually concluded, "You are like Stalin who killed people," to which Hoxha replied, "Stalin killed traitors, and we kill them, too."

=== Trade ===
In an effort to persuade the Albanian leadership to reconcile itself with the Soviets, the USSR gave a loan of $160 million in roubles to Albania in late-1957 for Albania's Third Five-Year Plan and among other things forgave $105 million in past debts Albania owed the Soviet Union. These efforts proved unsuccessful in persuading the Albanians to change their course. James S. O'Donnell observed that the Soviets, then in an early stage of the Sino-Soviet split, may have also tried to demonstrate Soviet "generosity" in an effort to counteract the amount of trade Albania was conducting with the People's Republic of China. Albania's trade deficit with China had grown from 4.2 percent in 1955 to 21.6 percent in 1957.

=== Moscow Conference ===
Relations between the Soviet Union and Yugoslavia deteriorated further following Tito's refusal to attend the 1957 International Conference of the Communist and Workers' Parties, the goal of which was to establish the general line and common positions of the international communist movement. As Hoxha later wrote:

Khrushchev and Co. made feverish efforts not only to ensure that the League of Communists of Yugoslavia would take part as a "party of a socialist country", but if possible also, to ensure that Tito would reach agreement with Khrushchev over the platform ... Each side wanted to exploit the meeting for its own aims: Khrushchev, to declare "unity", even with painful concessions to satisfy and draw in Tito, while the latter, to urge the others to openly and finally abandon Marxism–Leninism, the struggle against modern revisionism and any principled stand.

The Albanian delegation led by Hoxha worked with the Chinese and other like-minded delegations to the Conference in drafting a declaration alongside the CPSU and the pro–Soviet parties, with the resulting document being described by some Western observers as a compromise; historian William E. Griffith wrote that "the statement leaned strongly toward the Russian position but usually was sufficiently ambiguous so that the Chinese and Albanians could (and did) interpret it in their favor." In a notable example, the Albanian and Chinese view that revisionism was the "principal danger in the communist world" existed alongside the Soviet view that the 20th Party Congress "opened a new stage in the international communist movement," but despite this the declaration was considered overall by both Albania and China as an ideological victory.

In Hoxha's view, "The whole concern of the Soviet Khrushchevites was 'to preserve unity', to keep the socialist countries and the communist parties of different countries in check ... They retreated, held back temporarily, in order to gather strength and take their revisionist revenge in the future." O'Donnell states that after the Moscow Conference any trouble in Soviet–Albanian relations "was kept strictly private" until June 1960.

== Split deepens ==
At the end of 1958, Comecon had begun to push for what was later termed an "international socialist division of labor," in which Albania was relegated to "the task of supplying the member states with agricultural and mineral raw materials." In May 1959, Khrushchev paid a visit to Albania with the aim of pressuring Albania's leadership into building up Yugoslav–Albanian and Soviet–Albanian ties and also to, in the words of historian Miranda Vickers, "focus their economy on the growing of citrus fruits rather than concentrate on industrialization and the expansion of their oil industry ... Khrushchev's visit was clouded by an atmosphere of mistrust, which culminated in a hurried departure two days earlier than scheduled."

According to Hoxha, Khrushchev displayed contempt for Albanian archaeology in Butrint and said to Rodion Malinovsky, the Soviet Defense Minister who was visiting the country with him, "Look, how marvelous this is! An ideal base for our submarines could be built here. These old things [reference to archaeological findings] should be dug up and thrown into the sea ... We shall have the most ideal and most secure base in the Mediterranean. From here we can paralyze and attack everything." He was also said to have remarked to Hoxha to turn his country "into a flourishing garden," suggested he make it an attractive holiday spot for Soviet tourists, and rather than produce grain, Albania should focus on growing oranges for export. Khrushchev allegedly said, "The Soviet Union has such an abundance of grain that the mice eat more than you can produce here."

By the beginning of 1960, Albania and China had concurred "on such questions as Yugoslav revisionism, global strategy, and de-Stalinization", and the Albanian leadership made "little secret of their sympathies for the Chinese stand." With the Sino-Soviet split also deepening the Soviet leadership began applying its first signs of economic pressure on Albania in March 1960, stating its intention to alter a scholarship agreement for Albanians to study in the USSR in which the Soviets paid 60 percent of tuition costs and upkeep for the students. This threat was subsequently retracted on the eve of the Bucharest Conference in June that year, possibly in an attempt not to push Albania further into the Chinese orbit. In 1960, there were food shortages in Eastern Europe and famine in China. Albania received wheat from China, which was purchased from France. Hoxha caused a rift with the Soviet Union after he aligned his country with China. At a meeting in Moscow of the 81 communist parties in November, Hoxha defended Stalin's legacy against revisionism, criticized Khrushchev's anti-Stalinism, and criticized the Soviet Union for interfering in Albanian affairs, for trying to encourage international communists to condemn China, for trying to blackmail Albania into submission and for failing to support the country during the famine.

Early in June, Khrushchev met with Greek politician Sophocles Venizelos and reacted positively to the latter's suggestion of greater autonomy for Greeks in Albania. O'Donnell comments: "The obvious purpose of this discussion was to infuriate Enver Hoxha as Albanian–Greek relations were strained at this time. It became known that Khrushchev had hinted to Venizelos that the Soviet Union would not be against territorial and/or political concessions to the Greeks by the Albanians ... It is likely that Khrushchev used the meeting with Venizelos as a way to pay back Hoxha for snubbing him during his visit to Albania." Griffith added: "Hoxha viewed this move by Khrushchev as an implicit threat to partition Albania – the overwhelming traditional fear of all Albanian nationalists."

=== Bucharest Conference ===
At the opening of the Bucharest Conference on 21 June 1960, which was held on the occasion of the Third Congress of the Romanian Workers' Party, Hoxha was not among the various heads of communist parties and states in attendance; Politburo member Hysni Kapo took his place. The stated purpose of the Conference was to have "the character of a preliminary meeting of the representatives of the communist and workers' parties, mainly for the purpose of 'exchanging opinions' and taking a joint decision on the date and place of a future meeting of the communist and workers' parties of the world."

In his memoirs Hoxha describes the Conference as being a "putsch" and adds, "The revisionist renegades needed another meeting of international communism to gain approval for their old plan for the final legitimization of modern revisionism," he did not attend because "[we] suspected that the problem of the differences which had emerged between China and the Soviet Union would be discussed ... we had heard only one side of the argument, the Soviet side, and we were not acquainted with the objections of the Chinese ... They had to be thrashed out thoroughly, they had to be studied carefully, and time was required for this. Therefore, our Party sent Comrade Hysni Kapo to Bucharest to discuss only the date of the future meeting," for decisions besides this date were not to be taken at the Conference itself.

In the words of Nicholas C. Pano, "Khrushchev attempted to transform the Bucharest Conference into a communist summit meeting for the purpose of securing the condemnation of the Chinese" with Kapo being the only representative of a European party "to refrain from criticizing Peking, to attack Yugoslav revisionism, and to refuse to alter his stand on the Chinese and Yugoslav issues despite Soviet pressure. Khrushchev's hopes of bringing the Albanians to heel by means of peaceful persuasion were certainly shattered by the time the Bucharest Conference had come to an end."

During the Conference Hoxha communicated with Kapo via radiogram, stating for instance on 24 June, in response to a lengthy document distributed at the Conference by the Soviets attacking the Chinese, "When you make your speech at the meeting you should declare: 'I am not authorized to make statements on these matters because our leadership knows that these matters will be discussed at the forthcoming Meeting of representatives of the parties, as we have all agreed.' ... We understand your difficult situation, but don't worry at all, for we are on the right road."

=== Hostilities ===
After the Conference ended, Khrushchev stepped up economic pressure on Albania, delaying a reply concerning 50,000 tons of requested grain to offset an acute food shortage caused by drought, and then issuing significant reductions in the amount of grain shipments. According to an Albanian account, the Soviet Union:

cut systematically all economic aid to Albania. It delayed and in some cases ceased altogether the delivery of goods and industrial equipment to Albania, refused to ship the grain our people were in urgent need of ... sell[ing it] not through clearing but in free currency ... stopped all supplies for the Albanian People's Army, from food and clothing to weapons and technical equipment whose delivery had been approved by the Joint Command of the Warsaw Treaty. The countries of Eastern Europe, too, set out on the course of aggravating relations with the PRA [People's Republic of Albania] and created a difficult situation by setting up a blockade on Albania jointly with the Soviet government.

The Soviets also attempted to threaten the Albanians with force; Andrei Grechko, then Supreme Commander of the Warsaw Treaty forces, remarked to an Albanian military delegation that they would not get military equipment agreed upon beforehand, saying, "You are only in the Warsaw Pact for the time being, anyway." Attempts were made to inoculate anti-government views in Albanian students studying abroad in the USSR and to convince the armed forces to go against the government. According to an Albanian account, the Soviet embassy in Albania also "carried out intensive diversionist activity in order to create an atmosphere of uncertainty and ideological confusion about the correct line of the PLA [Party of Labour of Albania]." Khrushchev secretly encouraged pro-Soviet rivals of Hoxha to carry out a coup d'état. The coup attempt failed. In July, the military plot headed by Soviet-trained Rear Admiral Teme Sejko was uncovered and the plotters executed. Khrushchev was unwilling to carry out a full-scale invasion to bring Albania back within the Soviet influence.

=== Pro–Soviet faction in Albania ===
Within the Party itself an effort was also made by pro–Soviet elements to overthrow Hoxha. In June, Politburo member Liri Belishova visited China, giving a speech on June 6 which, in the words of Griffith, "could hardly have made her pro–Soviet sympathies clearer," having been full of praise for the Soviet Union, with said praise being omitted when the text was published the day after in the Party newspaper Zëri i Popullit.

While in China Belishova made contact with the Soviet embassy there, telling them what the Chinese had told her without authorization from the Albanian Politburo. Belishova and Koço Tashko, Chairman of the Central Auditing Committee, shared leadership of the pro–Soviet faction. Foreign journalist Harry Hamm was told by Albanian functionaries that "Belishova and Tashko had never made any secret of their pro–Soviet leanings, and that they had maintained their attitude long after the decision had been made to move closer to Beijing's general line. Their stubborn attitude was bound to lead to their expulsion from the Party and to their being relieved of all their offices."

Tashko, asked to speak on his own behalf, had his text prepared beforehand by the Soviet embassy and, having gotten confused, accidentally read the punctuation mark for a full stop in Russian amid a burst of laughter from those present. Both Belishova and Tashko were expelled from the Party in September.

=== International Conference of the Communist and Workers' Parties ===
In October 1960, a preparatory Commission for the upcoming International Conference of the Communist and Workers' Parties scheduled for November that year was held from 1–21 October, with the Albanian delegation being led by Hysni Kapo and Ramiz Alia. Alia later recalled: "the aim of the Soviets was to ensure that our Party did not come out against their party and Khrushchev, did not bring the fight out in the open, and speak about Bucharest and the contradictions which existed. To this end, they created around our delegation a harsh and dangerous atmosphere, in which open threats were combined with cunning flattery."

Hoxha once again communicated via radiogram, writing to Kapo on 13 October: "We are not of the same opinion as those who are trying to smooth out the problems by means of phrases in resolutions or declarations ... We are for carrying the matter through to the end. If this is not understood, it means that the danger which the Khrushchev group represents for the world communist movement is not understood. It does not depend on us whether this group should continue in power or not, but it is essential that we, should expose this group with Khrushchev at the head, as they deserve ... we shall not allow ourselves to be impressed by those who say: 'How can one attack the glorious Soviet Union or the great Communist Party of Lenin for the faults of a few rascals?' We say: Precisely to defend the Soviet Union and the Party of Lenin, these 'rascals' must be exposed, and there must be no toning down of criticism or covering up of the deviationists."

On 22 October, after the work of the commission had ended, Khrushchev invited the delegates to a dinner which, according to Alia, was used "to threaten those parties which might oppose the line of the Soviets in November." He gave as an example an exchange between Soviet Politburo member Yekaterina Furtseva and Kapo, in which the former asked, "Are you Hysni Kapo?! I've heard so much about you ..." Kapo replied, "For good or bad?" to which Furtseva stated, "You have attacked the Soviet Union, but you are heading for trouble on that course," getting "the reply she deserved" from Kapo, with Alia further writing "her mission was just to transmit the signal. Throughout the whole dinner she did not speak to us again."

From 3–25 November, Enver Hoxha headed the Albanian delegation which would present its case at the Second International Conference of the Communist and Workers' Parties together with Kapo, Alia, and others. Alia later noted, "The Soviets' aim was to ensure that Comrade Enver did not speak openly in Moscow, that, at the most, he should restrict himself to general criticisms on a theoretical plane ... they brought all-sided pressure to bear on our delegation ... even us[ing] the official reception for the celebration of November 7 against our delegation for these purposes."

On 5 November, a 125-page letter was sent from the Central Committee of the CPSU to its Chinese counterpart ignoring the existence of Albania as a socialist country and "malign[ing] the Party of Labour of Albania." Later noting this letter in regards to China, Hoxha wrote that, "They distributed this voluminous material against China before the meeting, in order to prepare the terrain and to brainwash the delegations of other parties, and to intimidate the Chinese, to compel them to take a moderate stand, if they would not submit. This anti-Chinese material did not surprise us, but it strengthened the conviction we had in the correctness of the line and the Marxist–Leninist stands of our Party in defence of the Communist Party of China."

On 10 November 1960, the second International Conference of the Communist and Workers' Parties was convened. As Hoxha recalled, "In his speech Khrushchev expressed the revisionist views completely and attacked the Communist Party of China and the Party of Labour of Albania, as well as those who were going to follow these parties, but without mentioning any names ... wanted to keep all the communist and workers' parties of the world under his conductor's baton, under his dictate." On 12 November, a private meeting was held between members of the Albanian delegation including Hoxha and members of the Soviet leadership, which "showed that no compromise between them was possible."

During the meeting Hoxha noted that "[The Soviet ambassador to Albania] has asked to whom the Albanian army will be loyal. This question he addressed to our generals at the airport, in the presence of one of your generals. Our officers replied that our army would be loyal to Marxism–Leninism, to the Party of Labour and socialism." Khrushchev replied, "If our ambassador said such a thing, he was foolish." Hoxha in turn replied, "He was no fool. He committed this 'foolishness' following the Bucharest Meeting." The subject eventually came to the Vlora naval base, which was the subject of a Soviet–Albanian dispute to become acute months later. Khrushchev threatened Hoxha, saying, "We can dismantle the base if you like." Hoxha replied, "If you dismantle the base you will be making a big mistake. We have fought empty-bellied and bare-footed, but have never kowtowed to anybody." As the meeting's atmosphere became increasingly hostile Khrushchev declared, "You flare up in anger. You spat on me; no one can talk to you." The meeting ended after Kapo declared, "I do not agree that the talks should be conducted like this."

Hoxha delivered his speech to the Conference on 16 November, where he spoke "of the tremendous Soviet pressures to which the Albanian party and government had been subjected after the Bucharest meeting ... The only crime his régime had committed, the Albanian leader added, was that it did not agree that the Chinese communist party should be summarily and unjustly condemned. For this it had been treated in a manner that was shabby, anti-Marxist and uncomradely. Hoxha's speech had a shattering effect on the Moscow gathering."

According to Khrushchev, Hoxha said—amongst other things—that the Party of Labour and Albania itself "should merely applaud and approve, but express no opinion of its own. But this is neither Marxist nor acceptable. Marxism–Leninism has granted us the right to have our say, and no one can take this from us, either by means of political and economic pressure, or by means of threats and names they might call us." According to Alia, Khrushchev "tried to appear calm" when first replying, reading his written text "almost mechanically" in regards to China but as soon as he began to reply to Hoxha's speech "he lost his head and began to shout, scream and splutter." Khrushchev was said to have angrily remarked, "Comrade Hoxha, you have poured a bucket of filth over me: you are going to have to wash it off again."

Jon Halliday states "on this occasion Hoxha truly succeeded in putting himself and Albania on the world map. His denunciation of Khrushchev made headlines round the world and even his harshest critics usually concede Hoxha turned in an able performance and showed personal courage." In retirement, Khrushchev recalled the Conference and said Hoxha "bared his fangs at us even more menacingly than the Chinese themselves. After his speech, comrade Dolores Ibarruri, an old revolutionary and a devoted worker in the Communist movement, got up indignantly and said, very much to the point, that Hoxha was like a dog who bites the hand that feeds it."

Alia relates that during the Conference a Soviet security officer had said to both him and Kapo that the Soviet leadership might have been contemplating Hoxha's assassination. For this reason, as Hoxha relates in his memoirs, "The Khrushchevites were capable of anything and we took our own measures ... Hysni and Ramiz stayed on in Moscow, as they had to sign the declaration" while Hoxha left the Soviet Union by train and "arrived in Austria, went down by train through Italy and from Bari returned safe and sound to Tirana on our own aircraft and went directly to the reception organized on the occasion of the 28th and 29th of November."

At the Conference itself the Albanian delegation played a leading role together with its Chinese counterpart in giving the draft declaration "Marxist–Leninist content", and despite "serious flaws" (in the view of these delegations) "the Declaration eventually signed by the 81 parties was a repudiation of revisionist theses ... [and] condemned the Yugoslav form of 'international opportunism which is a concentrated expression of the theories of modern revisionism.' ... the Soviet revisionists and the revisionists in other countries and parties demonstrated [in the view of Albania and China] their opportunistic character by completely disregarding the principles set forth in a document they had found it expedient to sign."

On 19 December, Hoxha delivered his report to a plenum of the Central Committee of the Party concerning the Moscow Conference, remarking on the mutual defenses Albania and China provided for each other at Bucharest and Moscow and adding, "In the future our Party will strengthen its ties and friendship with the Communist Party of China and the great Chinese people, always upholding the teachings of Marxism–Leninism and the correct line always pursued by the Central Committee of our Party."

=== Soviet Mediterranean operations ===
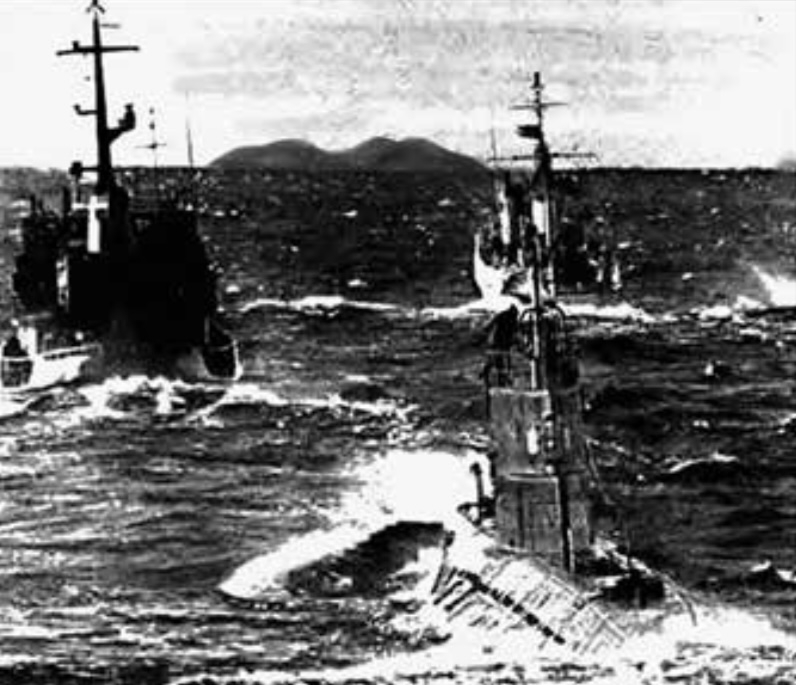
Withdrawal of the Soviet Navy from Pasha Liman Base, Vlorë (1961)

The Pasha Liman Base was a naval base of the Soviet Union in the island Sazan in the Mediterranean and was established in the 1950s. Soviet submarine operations in the Mediterranean Sea began in July 1958 after the emergence of the Lebanon crisis. The Soviets set up 12 Whiskey attack submarines at the port in Vlorë.

Khrushchev hoped that Albania would serve as a "military base on the Mediterranean Sea for all the socialist countries". The Soviets had provided equipment and training to the Albanian army and navy extensively, which included a fleet of 12 attack submarines for the navy. In 1961, the Soviet Union demanded the evacuation of all Albanian personnel from the Vlorë base and placing it "solely under Soviet command; otherwise the Soviet Government would proceed to the liquidation of the base." On 5 April 1961, Albania alleged that the presence of Soviet military personnel in Vlorë was temporary and conditional, i.e. the Soviets were just there to train the Albanians in the use of Soviet military equipment and techniques, following which they were to leave the base. Albania also claimed that all of the warships and other naval equipment on the base were under its legal ownership.

In April 1961, Soviet deputy premier Alexei Kosygin informed Hoxha about the Soviet Union's decision to withdraw all of its ships. Albanian forces blocked the base, deployed artillery and entered a submarine that was under Soviet command. Some Soviet ships were allowed to leave, but Albania kept four submarines, along with smaller craft, weapons and equipment. In May 1961, the Soviets began dismantling the base and tried to seize the submarines, seizing some Albanian ships undergoing repairs at Sevastopol in the process. As the Albanian account describes it, "The Soviet sailors and officers carried out numerous provocations, trying by all manner of means to create a pretext for the Soviet military intervention in Albania ... On May 26, it seized in a demonstrative manner eight submarines, the floating base 'Kotelnikov', as well as the Albanian warships that were laid for repair in the port of Sevastopol. On June 5, the personnel of Soviet advisers left the base at Vlora, too." As a result of the rift, the Soviet Union imposed economic sanctions on Albania, recalled eight submarines, broke up Soviet naval facilities at the port of Vlorë, and engaged in polemical exchanges with Albanian leaders.

Hoxha's account is as follows: Admiral Vladimir Kasatonov of the Black Sea Fleet "came to Tirana with the mission of seizing not only the eight submarines ... but even the submarines which we had taken over earlier. We told him bluntly: Either you hand the submarines over to us according to the agreement, or within a short time (we set the date) you must withdraw immediately from the bay ... He did not hand over the submarines, but went to Vlora, boarded the command submarine and lined up the others in fighting formation. We gave orders to close the Sazan Narrows and to train the guns on the Soviet ships. Admiral Kasatonov, who had wanted to frighten us, was frightened himself. He was caught like a rat in a trap and if he attempted to implement his plan he might find himself at the bottom of the sea. In these conditions the admiral was obliged to take only the submarines with Soviet crews, and he sailed out of the bay back home with his tail between his legs."

Per Hoxha: "When we returned from Moscow [in November 1960], the provocations at the [Vlora submarine] base were increased and in order to exert pressure on and impress us, the Soviet deputy foreign minister, Firyubin, came to Tirana with two other 'deputies': the first deputy-chief of the General Staff of the Soviet Army and Navy, Antonov, and the deputy chief of the Supreme Staff of the Soviet Navy, Sergeyev. They came allegedly 'to reach agreement', but in fact they brought us an ultimatum: The Vlora base must be put completely and solely under Soviet command, which was to be subordinate to the commander-in-chief of the Armed Forces of the Warsaw Treaty." An Albanian account describes the dispute as follows: "By violating the formal Albanian–Soviet agreements signed in September 1957 and May 1959, the Soviet government did everything in its power to put under its control this Albanian base which at the same time served the defence of the socialist countries ... On April 5, 1961, in a letter addressed to the governments of the Soviet Union and the East-European states it resolutely reaffirmed that it accepted only one solution of the problem: the base of Vlora belonged to Albania and all the naval means that were its property should be handed over to Albanian crew as soon as possible. Any other solution was an act which would lead to the unilateral violation on the part of the Soviet Union of the existing Albanian–Soviet agreements of the years 1957 and 1959."

The Soviet Navy was expelled from Vlorë. Per professor of Soviet studies Bruce W. Watson, several Soviet sailors were killed by Albanian forces during the expulsion. Due to strong Soviet pressure, Albania agreed to let the Soviets evacuate with most of their submarines and other military equipment. The Soviet ships left Albania on 26 May 1961, while the remaining Soviet naval personnel left Albania on 5 June 1961. Khrushchev ordered Soviet warships to perform maneuvers along the Albanian coast. As they did not have an adequate logistical capability, the Soviet Navy had to stop its Mediterranean operations after its expulsion from Albania. As a result, there was a three-year halt in operations which ended when Soviet warships passed through the Turkish Straits in 1964. In later years, the navy created a submarine contingent as a part of its Mediterranean fleet. Albanian officials called for the Soviet Naval presence to be removed from the Mediterranean, denouncing the Brezhnev doctrine of qualified sovereignty as a fascist policy adopted by the Soviet government.

== Culmination ==
At the Fourth Congress of the Party of Labour held in February 1961, Hoxha declared—although still not mentioning the Soviets by name—that, "During the past few years, our Party and other Marxist–Leninist parties have waged a successful struggle against the views of modern revisionists ... But in spite of all the crushing blows and defeats it has received, revisionism ... remains the main danger to the international communist movement ... a resolute and uncompromising struggle must be waged against revisionism until it is utterly destroyed."

According to an Albanian account, "Right after the 4th Congress of the PLA, when it became clear that its attempts at imposing its will on Albania were futile, the Soviet leadership cut off all the credits envisaged in the agreements between the two countries." The Congress, which was the last one in which Soviet and East European representatives from other parties would attend, "confirmed that the rift with Russia was almost complete and the alliance between China and Albania an accomplished fact."

On 20 January that year, the Soviets announced a withdrawal of their oil specialists within a seven- to ten-day period. The Albanians later claimed the specialists had sabotaged Albania's oil installations before departing. Although Khrushchev had symbolically delivered blueprints for the Palace of Culture of Tirana on the occasion of his 1959 visit, all Soviet construction efforts on it ceased by April 1961. A shipment of materials for the Palace, which arrived in Durrës, was "withdrawn at once on the pretext that the materials 'had been loaded by mistake and were not really intended for Albania.'"

On 23 April, a Sino-Albanian trade agreement was concluded; Soviet First Deputy Premier Alexei Kosygin sent a letter five days later which effectively signaled the end to Soviet–Albanian trade agreements. Among other things it stated that "It is understandable that the Albanian leadership cannot expect in the future that the USSR will help it as it has in the past, with aid from which only true friends and brothers have a right to benefit." On 19 August, the Soviet ambassador to Albania left Tirana "and was never to return." On 26 August, "only five days before the beginning of the fall semester," the Soviets canceled scholarships for Albanian students studying in the USSR; these students were given a deadline to leave by October.

An Albanian account of the economy during this period states observes "the foreign specialists left unfinished about 40 important objects of the 2nd Five-year Plan in the industrial sector alone. Difficulties increased even more after the cessation of military aid. Thus in the first years of the 3rd Five-year Plan the fulfillment of the plan in many sectors of the economy was made very difficult and to a certain extent the development of the Albanian economy as a whole was impaired."

Due to the worsening relations between the two countries, the Soviet Union annulled the military agreements it had signed with Albania and terminated all shipments intended for Albania. Military pressure was stepped up still further; during summer "the training of all Albanian officers, cadets, and noncoms in the Soviet Union or the East European satellite countries was brought to a stop. Since then, there has been not a single Albanian studying at a military academy in the Eastern Bloc. It has been impossible, therefore, for the Tirana Government to keep its army up-to-date on military theory." The Soviets recalled their military advisers and specialists from Albania. In March, Albania had not been invited to attend a meeting of the Warsaw Treaty states.

At the 22nd Congress of the Communist Party of the Soviet Union in October that year, Khrushchev openly attacked the Albanian leadership, proclaiming Hoxha a "leftist nationalist deviationist" and calling for his overthrow, declaring that, "We are certain the time will come when the Albanian communists and the Albanian people will have their say, and then the Albanian leaders will have to answer for the harm they have done their country, their people and the cause of socialist construction in Albania."

He further stated that "The imperialists are always prepared to pay 30 pieces of silver to those who split the Communist ranks." To this Hoxha replied in a 7 November speech, "the Albanian people and their Party of Labor will even live on grass if need be, but they will never sell themselves 'for 30 pieces of silver' ... They would rather die honourably on their feet than live in shame on their knees." Nicholas C. Pano noted that "[Khrushchev's] pronouncements [at the 22nd Congress], at least insofar as the Soviet leadership was concerned, had made the policies of de-Stalinization, peaceful coexistence, and reconciliation with Yugoslavia adopted at the 20th Congress of the CPSU binding upon the members of the communist system."

Despite Albanian calls for the continued existence of state relations between the two countries, the Soviet government formally withdrew its ambassador on 25 November, and on 3 December, withdrew "the whole personnel of its embassy and commercial representation from the PRA, while at the same time demanding that the personnel of the Albanian embassy and the Albanian commercial adviser should leave the territory of the Soviet Union." "Thus," the Albanian account continues, "the Khrushchev revisionist group, consistent in its line, cut off all relations with socialist Albania at a time when it maintained contacts with and was drawing ever closer to the most reactionary regimes of the world."

In a 10 December Zëri i Popullit article, Hoxha wrote:

The real cause [of the break in diplomatic relations] must be sought in the revisionist views of Khrushchev and in his anti-Marxist efforts to impose them on the other parties by any means ... with a view to silencing our Party, to subjugating it and giving a lesson to anyone that would dare to oppose him, Khrushchev extended the ideological disagreements to the field of state relations and began to behave with the PRA as towards an enemy country ... he aims to intimidate and subjugate the PLA, to shift it from its revolutionary Marxist–Leninist positions, to shake the confidence of our people in the PLA and its leadership, to upset the feelings of friendship of the Albanian people towards the Soviet Union ...

But Khrushchev is trying in vain ... Under the leadership of the PLA, the Albanian people have scored historic victories in the course of these 20 years: they liberated the country from the fascist invaders and established the people's state power, reconstructed the war-ravaged country, liquidated the centuries-old backwardness and achieved great successes in the construction of socialist society ... Our Party is fighting for a great cause, for the truth of Marxism–Leninism ...

On this course, marching shoulder to shoulder with the sister Marxist–Leninist parties and the fraternal peoples of the socialist countries, as well as with all the revolutionary forces of the world, our Party and people will score complete victory over the imperialist and revisionist enemies. Marxism–Leninism cannot be vanquished! Socialism and communism will triumph!

In December 1961, the two countries severed diplomatic ties. Albania was removed from participation in Warsaw Pact's councils.

== Subsequent developments ==
In his memoirs Khrushchev described the Albanian leadership as "monsters," saying that, "The rift which developed between the Soviet Union and Albania stemmed mainly from the Albanians' fear of democratisation." The downfall of Khrushchev in 1964 saw Hoxha write an article for Zëri i Popullit in which he stated that, "Despite the fact that Khrushchev was the head of modern revisionism, his political liquidation as a person does not mean the liquidation of his political, ideological, economic and organizational course ... Khrushchevite revisionism is not dead, his ideology and policy expressed in the line of the 20th and 22nd Congresses of the CPSU are not liquidated."

In the view of Bill Ash, writing in support of the Albanian position, "The final proof of the correctness of Albania's characterisation of Soviet revisionism came with the invasion and military occupation of Czechoslovakia in 1968 – 'Khrushchevism without Khrushchev', since Brezhnev who succeeded the deposed revisionist leader followed the same line."

An Albanian account discussing the invasion notes, "Albania resolutely denounced this act, calling it 'an aggression of the fascist type' which 'represented the greatest debasement of the honour and authority of the Soviet Union and the Soviet people on the part of the Khrushchevite revisionist Brezhnev–Kosygin clique' ... the Warsaw Treaty had completely been transformed from a means of defence into a means of aggression" and having been de facto excluded from the Pact since 1961, "on September 13, 1968, at an extraordinary session the People's Assembly of the People's Republic of Albania decided to denounce this Treaty and exonerate Albania from any obligation deriving from it." In the 1970s, the alliance between Albania and China against perceived Soviet revisionism gradually began to break down, resulting in the Albanian-Chinese split.

Writing in 1988, Ramiz Alia reiterated the Albanian view that, "The revisionist current most dangerous to the world communist movement has been and still is Soviet revisionism" and that, "To oppose the Communist Party of the Soviet Union, which had great political and theoretical authority, meant to isolate oneself, at least for a time, from most of the communist parties of the world. Precisely here lies the heroism of the Party of Labour of Albania, the majesty of its decision, and its courage and determination for the cause of Marxism–Leninism, for the cause of socialism and communism."

In July 1990, after the fall of the Eastern Bloc and political upheaval in Albania itself, Alia announced the restoration of diplomatic relations with the Soviet Union. In an official communiqué the Soviets "attributed the normalisation [of diplomatic relations] to the better political climate in Europe, and the state radio reported that, as the Soviet Union was on course for reform, 'there has been a marked trend recently towards democratisation of Albanian society'." In June 1991, the ruling Party of Labour became the social-democratic Socialist Party, dropping its prior commitment to Marxism–Leninism, and in December 1991, the Soviet Union was dissolved.

In 2020, the building of the former state security house and headquarters of Albania's KGB was opened for public visitation. The 'Museum of Secret Surveillance' commemorates Albania's popular experience of World War Two and Cold War Secret Surveillance that occurred during their 1944-1991 relations with the Soviet Union. An example of transitional justice and of how states in the former Eastern Bloc and Warsaw Pact alliance grappled with the socialist era, the museum won the Council of Europe's Museum Prize in 2020.

== See also ==
- Face to Face (1979 film)
- De-satellization of the Socialist Republic of Romania
