= Hysni Kapo =

Albanian politician (1915–1979)

Member of the Central Committee of the Party of Labour
- In office 1943–1979
- First Secretary of the Party of Labour: Enver Hoxha

Deputy Chairman of the Council of Ministers
- In office 1950–1956
- First Secretary of the Party of Labour: Enver Hoxha
- Chairman of the Council of Ministers: Enver Hoxha

Minister of Agriculture of Albania
- In office 1951–1954
- First Secretary of the Party of Labour: Enver Hoxha
- Chairman of the Council of Ministers: Enver Hoxha

Deputy Minister of Foreign Affairs of Albania
- In office 1947–1949
- First Secretary of the Party of Labour: Enver Hoxha
- Chairman of the Council of Ministers: Enver Hoxha
- Foreign Minister: Enver Hoxha

Albanian Ambassador to Yugoslavia
- In office 1945–1947
- First Secretary of the Party of Labour: Enver Hoxha

Personal details
- Born: March 3–4, 1915 Tërbaç, Principality of Albania
- Died: September 23, 1979 Paris, France
- Party: Party of Labour of Albania
- Spouse: Vito Kapo
- Children: Pëllumb Kapo (son)
- Occupation: Soldier

Military service
- Allegiance: Democratic Government of Albania; Socialist Albania
- Branch/service: LNÇ/LANÇ (until 1945); Albanian People's Army (from 1945)
- Battles/wars: Battle of Gjorm; Battle of Drashovica; Albanian Offensive into Yugoslavia

Hysni Kapo (1915–1979) was an Albanian military commander and leading member of the Party of Labour of Albania. A member of the Communist Youth group, Kapo was first distinguished as an artillery commander in the Battle of Drashovica. In 1941 he was elected as a representative of the Youth group in the provisional central committee of the party and from 1956 until his death in 1979, he served as secretary of the central committee of the labour party. Hysni Kapo served in many ministerial positions and was a member of the Politburo of the Party of Labour of Albania from 1948 to his death. In the 1960s he played an important role in the emancipation of women in Albania during the Cultural and Ideological Revolution, and is remembered as a trusted man of the Albanian communist leader Enver Hoxha.

== Early life ==
Hysni Kapo was born in Tërbaç, Vlorë District, southwestern Albania on March 4 or 3, 1915. He studied at the Commercial School of Vlore.

== Military life ==
In the 1930s he joined the Communist Youth group, an organization closely associated with the founders of the Communist Party of Albania (later renamed the Party of Labour of Albania). During World War II he commanded LNÇ units in the Vlorë area. In the Battle of Gjorm in January 1943 he was the second-in-command of the LNÇ units after Mehmet Shehu. In the Battle of Drashovica in September 1943 was the general commander of LNÇ battalions and was stationed in the hills opposite to the German encampment. During the battle his leg was wounded and he was moved to Lapardha.

== Political life ==
After World War II, Kapo served as ambassador to Yugoslavia (1945–47), deputy Minister of Foreign Affairs (1947–49), deputy Prime Minister (1950–56), and Minister of Agriculture (1951-1954). He also was member of the Central Committee of the Party of Labour of Albania from 1943 till 1979, and full member of the Politburo from 1946 to 1979. From 1955 until the Soviet-Albanian split, he also served as President of the Albanian-Soviet Friendship Society. Kapo attended the 1960 International Meeting of Communist and Workers Parties in the place of Enver Hoxha and Mehmet Shehu, highlighting the growing tensions between Tirana and Moscow. Kapo was considered the third-highest party official at the time, after Hoxha and Shehu.

== Personal life ==
Kapo was married two times. He had a son, Pëllumb, from the first marriage. Kapo was then married to Vito Kapo, née Kondi, an early communist and long time president of the Women's Branch of the Party of Labour.

Kapo died in 1979 of pancreatic cancer in Paris, France, where he was receiving medical treatment.
