= Javer Hurshiti =

Albanian military officer

Javer Hurshiti

Javer Hurshiti was an Albanian military and political figure.

== Biography ==
Hurshiti was born in 1880 (or 1883) in Caucasus and he was the adoptive son of Maliq Pashë Libohova, from Libohovë. He was adopted in Istanbul and his mother was probably a Nubian mistress.

Hurshiti studied in Istanbul and returned to Gjirokastër right before the turbulent times in the eve of Albanian Declaration of Independence. As an opponent of the Autonomous Republic of Northern Epirus he was imprisoned shortly in Corfu.

The Vlora War would find him as commander of the volunteer troops from Gjirokastër when he showed his military skills. His political career before World War II includes positions as mayor of Gjirokastër in 1920, acting prefect in 1924, and member of the Albanian Parliament in 1925, during the last one he would be the initiator of bringing to Gjirokastër the remains of Çerçiz Topulli (1880-1915), a process of which the future communist leader Enver Hoxha would attribute to himself all credits.

Under the Italian occupation he was elected member of the State Council, and after Minister of Popular Culture in the short-lived government of Maliq Bushati from 12 February to 28 April 1943. In August 1943 he was Inspector General in the Prime Minister's office. His last assignment would be as prefect of Shkodër from January 1944. He was arrested and sent to the communist Special Court in 1945, which sentenced him to death as "collaborationist" and "enemy of the people" like many other politicians of the pre-communist era.
