= Beqir Valteri =

Albanian politician (1892–1945)

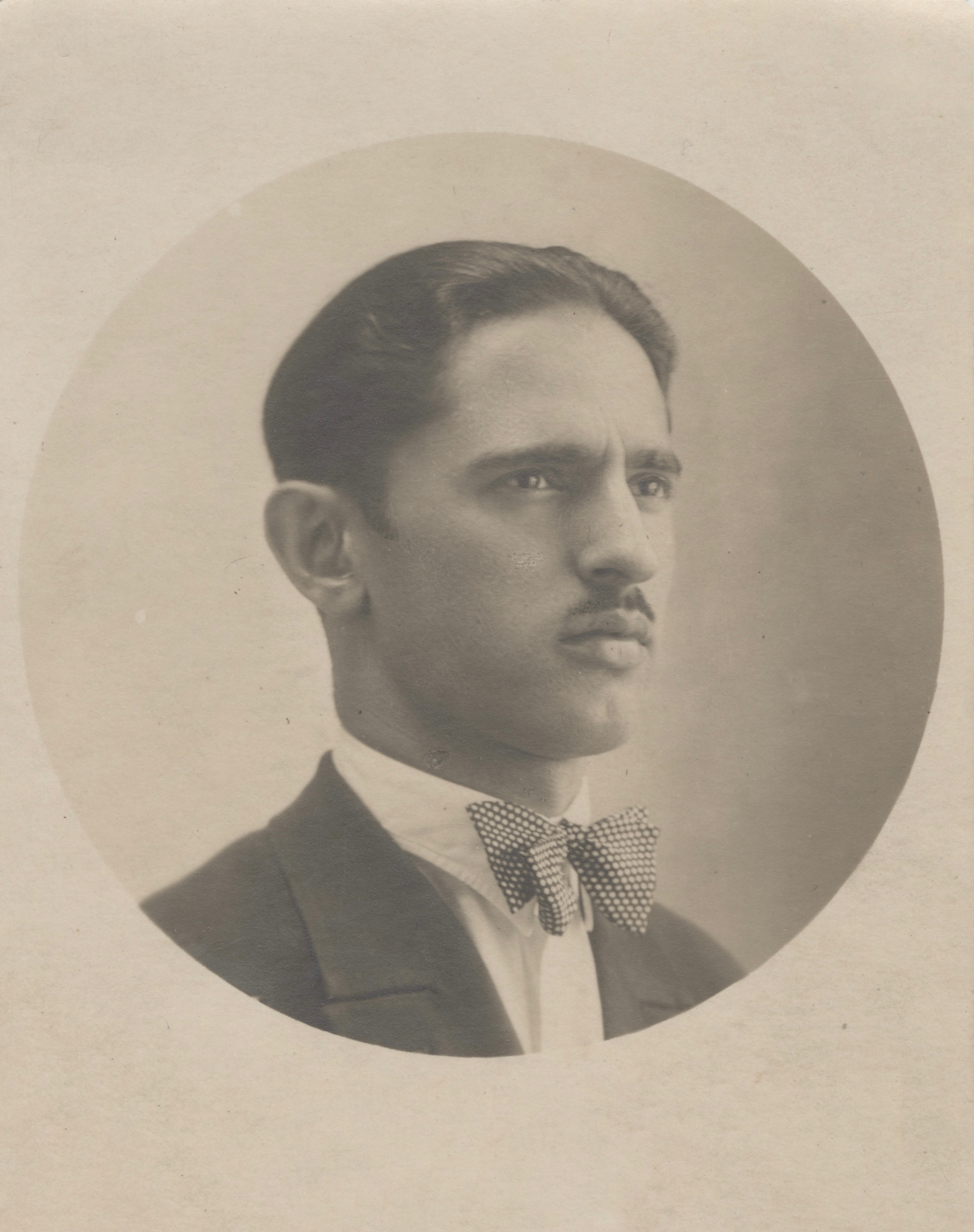
- Portrait of Valteri

Personal details
- Born: 6 January 1892 Vinjoll, Mat, Ottoman Empire
- Died: 14 April 1945 (aged 53) Tirana, People's Socialist Republic of Albania
- Party: Albanian Fascist Party
- Occupation: Politician, activist, militant

Beqir Valteri (Albanian: Beqir Valteri; 6 January 1892 – 14 April 1945) was an Albanian politician and nationalist who held Republican and Fascist ideas. In the 1920s he was a supporter of Fan Noli. He was the first person to attempt to assassinate Ahmet Zogu. In the 1940s, he became a member of the Albanian Fascist Party; after the communists came to power, he was tried by the Special Court and sentenced to death.

== Early life ==
Valteri was born into a family of German origin (it is widely believed that his ancestors were invited by Skanderbeg as specialists to help manufacture weapons). He was educated in Italy. He was a supporter of Albanian independence and the republican movement of Fan Noli. He was a deputy of the first Albanian parliament from 1920–1923.

== Assassination attempt on Zogu ==
On February 23, 1924, Valteri tried to assassinate Prime Minister Ahmet Zogu, the leader of the conservative forces, and later the King of Albania. At the entrance to the parliament building, Valteri fired three bullets, all three hit Zogu, but none were fatal. Valteri barricaded himself in one of the rooms and engaged in a shootout with the gendarmes, singing patriotic songs, until the deputies convinced him to surrender. After a short time, he was released. Zogu later met with him in custody.

The story of Valteri's attempt on Zogu's life is controversial due to conflicting details. In several sources, the attacker is named as a young man of 16–18 years old, while Valteri was over 30 by that time. Questions were raised by the quick release of Valteri who committed the terrorist attack as this course of action was atypical of Zog. It remains unclear if there was a connection between the actions of Valteri and the anti-Zogist leader Avni Rustemi, who was killed in a conspiracy by conservative Zogu supporters two months later.

== Collaboration with the axis ==
Valteri moved to Italy, where he became fascinated with the ideas of fascism. He returned to Albania during the Italian occupation. He was a member of the Albanian Fascist Party and served in the Fascist Militia.

In 1944, when the Italian occupation ended and paved the way for German occupation, Valteri founded the nationalist Great Albanian Fatherland Party. He was a member of the collaborationist parliament and opposed Albanian communists.

Valteri was at odds with Social Democrat Musine Kokalari. She noted in her memoirs that she blamed Valteri and many others for the German occupation and the growing war in Albania, especially right-wing and anti-communists.

Valteri lived in Tirana before his execution.

== Trial and execution ==
After the communists came to power in November 1944, Beqir Valteri was arrested in March 1945. And as part of a large group of anti-communist politicians he appeared before the Special Court. On April 13, 1945, Valteri was sentenced to death and executed by firing squad the next day in Tirana.
