= Medar Shtylla =

Albanian politician (1907–1963)

20th Speaker of the Parliament of Albania
- In office 21 June 1958 – 20 December 1963
- Preceded by: Rita Marko
- Succeeded by: Lefter Goga

Personal details
- Born: 28 February 1907; Korçë, Ottoman Albania
- Died: 20 December 1963 (aged 56); Tirana, People's Republic of Albania
- Political party: Party of Labour of Albania

Medar Shtylla (28 February 1907 in Korçë – 20 December 1963 in Tirana) was an Albanian politician and one of the main organizers of the Albania Liberation Movement during World War II. He served as Minister of Health from 1946 to 1955 and later as Chairman of the Assembly of the Republic of Albania from 21 June 1958 until his death on 20 December 1963.
