= Bedri Spahiu =

Albanian politician and general

Bedri Spahiu (July 13, 1908 – 11 January 1998) was an Albanian politician and Lieutenant-General and one of the most prominent figures of the Albanian Labour Party up to 1956.

== Life ==
Born into a Muslim, Albanian family in Gjirokastër, Spahiu completed his education in 1923 in Shkodër, and then continued his further education at a school run by Italians in Istanbul. After his return to Albania, he joined the Albanian army in 1927 as a soldier in the artillery school of Tirana and was in military service until his dismissal for alleged subversive behavior in 1935.

In 1941 he joined the newly founded Albanian Communist Party and became a member of the Provisional Central Committee, on whose behalf he took over the party organization in his home town of Gjirokastër. During World War II, he was one of the main communist leaders of the partisan forces of the Albanian National Liberation Front. For his deeds and bravery he was awarded numerous orders and medals.

He belonged to the 118 persons consisting of Anti-Fascist Council of National Liberation, which was in May 1944 by the Congress of Përmet selected as the interim parliament and helped the Communists to take power. After the founding of the People's Republic of Albania on 11 January 1946 he was deputy of the People's Assembly (Kuvendi Popullor) and this was one of the first term until 4 February 1955 on. At times he was also a member of the Presidium of the People's Assembly, and thus the collective state presidency.

First, he became minister for reconstruction, but was shortly thereafter promoted to lieutenant general and appointed Attorney General. In this position he was first for the organization of special courts and soon thereafter in charge of cases against high-ranking party officials such as Koçi Xoxe.

At the first Congress of the PPSh he was elected in November 1948 as a member of the Politburo and was until this March 1952.

On 24 July 1953 he was Minister of Education and Culture in the government of Prime Minister Enver Hoxha and he held this position until his replacement by Ramiz Alia in 1955.

Together with another prominent communist figure Tuk Jakova, he requested a slowdown of the industrialization of Albania, of the process of collectivization of agriculture, and the "democratization" of Albanian communist party. For his standing he was accused by Enver Hoxha of being a "revisionist" and was released from his executive and Party roles. Two weeks later came his arrest and expulsion from the party and after the internment with his family in Elbasan.

In the Albanian communist party conference in Tirana in 1956, the opponents of Enver Hoxha requested information on the fate of Koçi Xoxe, Tuk Jakova, Bedri Spahiu and other prominent party members and asked for their rehabilitation.

These actions sealed the fate of Bedri Spahiu and his friends in the eyes of Enver Hoxha. On 1 June 1957 Spahiu was sentenced to 25 years imprisonment, which he served first in Kanina and January 1958 in Tirana. Shortly after his release in October 1974 he was again arrested and was subsequently interned in Selenica until 10 May 1990. After the collapse of the communist regime he returned to Tirana where he died on January 11, 1998.
