= List of state leaders deposed by foreign powers in the 20th and 21st century =

This is a list of heads of state and governments deposed by a foreign power. The list is chronological.

== List ==
Head of State or Government	Country	Title	Deposed by	Date	Operation	Notes	Ref
Emilio Aguinaldo	Philippines	President	United States	23 March 1901	Philippine–American War		
Paul Kruger	South African Republic	State President	United Kingdom	31 May 1902	Second Boer War	The Orange Free State and the South African Republic were forced to surrender their sovereignty in the Treaty of Vereeniging to become colonies of the British Empire, but were promised an autonomous civilian government, and the colonies later merged with Cape Colony and Natal to form the Union of South Africa in 1910. Kruger had lived in exile from 7 May 1900 onward.	
Schalk Willem Burger	South African Republic	Acting State President	United Kingdom	31 May 1902	Second Boer War	The Orange Free State and the South African Republic were forced to surrender their sovereignty in the Treaty of Vereeniging to become colonies of the British Empire, but were promised an autonomous civilian government, and the colonies later merged with Cape Colony and Natal to form the Union of South Africa in 1910. Kruger had lived in exile from 7 May 1900 onward.	
Christiaan de Wet	Orange Free State	State President	United Kingdom	31 May 1902	Second Boer War	The Orange Free State and the South African Republic were forced to surrender their sovereignty in the Treaty of Vereeniging to become colonies of the British Empire, but were promised an autonomous civilian government, and the colonies later merged with Cape Colony and Natal to form the Union of South Africa in 1910. Kruger had lived in exile from 7 May 1900 onward.	
Gojong of Korea	Korea	Emperor	Japan	19 July 1907	Occupation of Korea		
Sunjong of Korea	Korea	Emperor	Japan	29 August 1910	Occupation of Korea		
Essad Toptani	Albania (Note: De facto government after the Collapse of the Principality of Albania.)	Prime Minister	Austria-Hungary	February 1916	Balkan Front of World War I	Toptani fled Albania during Great Retreat of the Serbian forces and the Austrian occupation of Northern Albania. Despite being a fellow member of the Entente, France founded the Republic of Korçë without Toptani's involvement.	
Mykhailo Hrushevsky	Ukraine	President of the Central Rada	Germany	29 April 1918	Ukrainian coup d'état	Ukraine was occupied by the Central Powers. After the relations worsened, Pavlo Skoropadsky staged a coup with German backing.	
Vsevolod Holubovych	Ukraine	Prime Minister	Germany	29 April 1918	Ukrainian coup d'état	Ukraine was occupied by the Central Powers. After the relations worsened, Pavlo Skoropadsky staged a coup with German backing.	
Ferdinand I of Bulgaria	Bulgaria	Tsar	Serbia	30 September 1918	Vardar Offensive	Bulgaria reached the verge of revolution from the Agrarian Union due to the breakdown of the Bulgarian Army, and became the first state in the Central Powers of World War I to surrender to the Allied Powers. After the Armistice of Salonica, Tsar Ferdinand I abdicated in favor his son Boris III and the Agrarian Union's leader Aleksandar Stamboliyski became Prime Minister.	
Ferdinand I of Bulgaria	Bulgaria	Tsar	France	30 September 1918	Vardar Offensive	Bulgaria reached the verge of revolution from the Agrarian Union due to the breakdown of the Bulgarian Army, and became the first state in the Central Powers of World War I to surrender to the Allied Powers. After the Armistice of Salonica, Tsar Ferdinand I abdicated in favor his son Boris III and the Agrarian Union's leader Aleksandar Stamboliyski became Prime Minister.	
Ferdinand I of Bulgaria	Bulgaria	Tsar	United Kingdom	30 September 1918	Vardar Offensive	Bulgaria reached the verge of revolution from the Agrarian Union due to the breakdown of the Bulgarian Army, and became the first state in the Central Powers of World War I to surrender to the Allied Powers. After the Armistice of Salonica, Tsar Ferdinand I abdicated in favor his son Boris III and the Agrarian Union's leader Aleksandar Stamboliyski became Prime Minister.	
Ferdinand I of Bulgaria	Bulgaria	Tsar	Greece	30 September 1918	Vardar Offensive	Bulgaria reached the verge of revolution from the Agrarian Union due to the breakdown of the Bulgarian Army, and became the first state in the Central Powers of World War I to surrender to the Allied Powers. After the Armistice of Salonica, Tsar Ferdinand I abdicated in favor his son Boris III and the Agrarian Union's leader Aleksandar Stamboliyski became Prime Minister.	
Ferdinand I of Bulgaria	Bulgaria	Tsar	Italy	30 September 1918	Vardar Offensive	Bulgaria reached the verge of revolution from the Agrarian Union due to the breakdown of the Bulgarian Army, and became the first state in the Central Powers of World War I to surrender to the Allied Powers. After the Armistice of Salonica, Tsar Ferdinand I abdicated in favor his son Boris III and the Agrarian Union's leader Aleksandar Stamboliyski became Prime Minister.	
Talaat Pasha	Ottoman Empire	Grand Vizier	British Empire	2 November 1918	Middle Eastern theatre of World War I	Pasha was a member of the Committee of Union and Progress controlling the politics of the late Ottoman Empire, and fled the country due to its loss of World War I and after the Armistice of Mudros. Backlash against the unpopular terms of the Treaty of Sèvres later lead to the fall of Sultan Mehmed VI and the Empire's replacement by the Republic of Turkey.	
Talaat Pasha	Ottoman Empire	Grand Vizier	Armenia	2 November 1918	Middle Eastern theatre of World War I	Pasha was a member of the Committee of Union and Progress controlling the politics of the late Ottoman Empire, and fled the country due to its loss of World War I and after the Armistice of Mudros. Backlash against the unpopular terms of the Treaty of Sèvres later lead to the fall of Sultan Mehmed VI and the Empire's replacement by the Republic of Turkey.	
Talaat Pasha	Ottoman Empire	Grand Vizier	France	2 November 1918	Middle Eastern theatre of World War I	Pasha was a member of the Committee of Union and Progress controlling the politics of the late Ottoman Empire, and fled the country due to its loss of World War I and after the Armistice of Mudros. Backlash against the unpopular terms of the Treaty of Sèvres later lead to the fall of Sultan Mehmed VI and the Empire's replacement by the Republic of Turkey.	
Talaat Pasha	Ottoman Empire	Grand Vizier	Italy	2 November 1918	Middle Eastern theatre of World War I	Pasha was a member of the Committee of Union and Progress controlling the politics of the late Ottoman Empire, and fled the country due to its loss of World War I and after the Armistice of Mudros. Backlash against the unpopular terms of the Treaty of Sèvres later lead to the fall of Sultan Mehmed VI and the Empire's replacement by the Republic of Turkey.	
Talaat Pasha	Ottoman Empire	Grand Vizier	Hejaz	2 November 1918	Middle Eastern theatre of World War I	Pasha was a member of the Committee of Union and Progress controlling the politics of the late Ottoman Empire, and fled the country due to its loss of World War I and after the Armistice of Mudros. Backlash against the unpopular terms of the Treaty of Sèvres later lead to the fall of Sultan Mehmed VI and the Empire's replacement by the Republic of Turkey.	
Charles I of Austria	Austria-Hungary	Emperor/ King	Italy	11 November 1918	Battle of Vittorio Veneto	The battle resulted in a rout of the Austro-Hungarian Army, which agreed to the Armistice of Villa Giusti., Despite Charles's attempts to alleviate famine and grant a federalist constitution, he was unable to stop the declaration of the Republic of German-Austria and "relinquish(ed) every participation in the administration of the State", though did not formally abdicate. Charles IV of Hungary's attempts to retake the throne in Hungary would later be blocked by the Allied Powers and Miklos Horthy.	
Charles I of Austria	Austria-Hungary	Emperor/ King	United Kingdom	11 November 1918	Battle of Vittorio Veneto		
Charles I of Austria	Austria-Hungary	Emperor/ King	France	11 November 1918	Battle of Vittorio Veneto		
Charles I of Austria	Austria-Hungary	Emperor/ King	United States	11 November 1918	Battle of Vittorio Veneto		
Kaiser Wilhelm II	Germany	Emperor	United Kingdom	28 November 1918	Hundred Days Offensive	Wilhelm II abdicated due to pressures from the war and the German Revolution. He lived in the Netherlands, which refused the Allies' extradition request for a war crimes trial under the Treaty of Versailles, until the end of his life.	
Kaiser Wilhelm II	Germany	Emperor	France	28 November 1918	Hundred Days Offensive	Wilhelm II abdicated due to pressures from the war and the German Revolution. He lived in the Netherlands, which refused the Allies' extradition request for a war crimes trial under the Treaty of Versailles, until the end of his life.	
Kaiser Wilhelm II	Germany	Emperor	Belgium	28 November 1918	Hundred Days Offensive	Wilhelm II abdicated due to pressures from the war and the German Revolution. He lived in the Netherlands, which refused the Allies' extradition request for a war crimes trial under the Treaty of Versailles, until the end of his life.	
Kaiser Wilhelm II	Germany	Emperor	Canada	28 November 1918	Hundred Days Offensive	Wilhelm II abdicated due to pressures from the war and the German Revolution. He lived in the Netherlands, which refused the Allies' extradition request for a war crimes trial under the Treaty of Versailles, until the end of his life.	
Kaiser Wilhelm II	Germany	Emperor	Italy	28 November 1918	Hundred Days Offensive	Wilhelm II abdicated due to pressures from the war and the German Revolution. He lived in the Netherlands, which refused the Allies' extradition request for a war crimes trial under the Treaty of Versailles, until the end of his life.	
Kaiser Wilhelm II	Germany	Emperor	United States	28 November 1918	Hundred Days Offensive	Wilhelm II abdicated due to pressures from the war and the German Revolution. He lived in the Netherlands, which refused the Allies' extradition request for a war crimes trial under the Treaty of Versailles, until the end of his life.	
Gyula Peidl	Hungary	Prime Minister	Romania	6 August 1919	Hungarian–Romanian War	Deposed in a right-wing coup amid a Romanian occupation of Budapest.	
Mammad Hasan Hajinski	Azerbaijan	Prime Minister	Russian Soviet Republic	28 May 1920	Red Army invasion of Azerbaijan	Later formed into the Transcaucasian Socialist Federative Soviet Republic	
Simon Vratsian	Armenia	Prime Minister	Russian Soviet Republic	2 December 1920	Red Army invasion of Armenia	Later formed into the Transcaucasian Socialist Federative Soviet Republic	
Noe Zhordania	Georgia	Prime Minister	Russian Soviet Republic	18 March 1921	Red Army invasion of Georgia	Later formed into the Transcaucasian Socialist Federative Soviet Republic	
Hussein	Hejaz	Caliph	Nejd	19 December 1925	Saudi conquest of Hejaz	Sultan of Nejd Ibn Saud adopted the titles King of Hejaz and Custodian of the Two Holy Mosques in 1926 which had been used by the Hashemites.	
Ali	Hejaz	King	Nejd	19 December 1925	Saudi conquest of Hejaz	Sultan of Nejd Ibn Saud adopted the titles King of Hejaz and Custodian of the Two Holy Mosques in 1926 which had been used by the Hashemites.	
Haile Selassie I	Ethiopia	Emperor	Fascist Italy	2 May 1936	Occupation of Ethiopia	Selassie would be restored to power in the East African Campaign of World War II after a period of exile in Bath, United Kingdom.	
Kurt Schuschnigg	Austria	Chancellor	Nazi Germany	11 March 1938	Anschluss		
Edvard Beneš	Czechoslovakia	President	Nazi Germany	5 October 1938	German occupation of Czechoslovakia		
Jan Syrový	Czechoslovakia	Prime Minister	Nazi Germany	1 December 1938	German occupation of Czechoslovakia		
Zog I of Albania	Albania	King	Fascist Italy	7 April 1939	Occupation of Albania		
Avgustyn Voloshyn	Carpatho-Ukraine	President	Hungary	18 March 1939	Occupation of Carpatho-Ukraine		
Felicjan Sławoj Składkowski	Poland	Prime Minister	Nazi Germany	28 September 1939	Invasion of Poland	Władysław Sikorski and Władysław Raczkiewicz would later lead the Polish government-in-exile headquartered at various times in Paris, Angers, and London. They would be prevented from returning after World War II due to the Allies' recognition of the Provisional Government of National Unity.	
Ignacy Mościcki	Poland	President	Nazi Germany	28 September 1939	Invasion of Poland	Władysław Sikorski and Władysław Raczkiewicz would later lead the Polish government-in-exile headquartered at various times in Paris, Angers, and London. They would be prevented from returning after World War II due to the Allies' recognition of the Provisional Government of National Unity.	
Ignacy Mościcki	Poland	President	Soviet Union	28 September 1939	Invasion of Poland	Władysław Sikorski and Władysław Raczkiewicz would later lead the Polish government-in-exile headquartered at various times in Paris, Angers, and London. They would be prevented from returning after World War II due to the Allies' recognition of the Provisional Government of National Unity.	
Ignacy Mościcki	Poland	President	Slovakia	28 September 1939	Invasion of Poland	Władysław Sikorski and Władysław Raczkiewicz would later lead the Polish government-in-exile headquartered at various times in Paris, Angers, and London. They would be prevented from returning after World War II due to the Allies' recognition of the Provisional Government of National Unity.	
Kārlis Ulmanis	Latvia	President	Soviet Union	July 21, 1940	Occupation of the Baltic states		
Antanas Smetona	Lithuania	President	Soviet Union	July 21, 1940	Occupation of the Baltic states		
Konstantin Päts	Estonia	Prime Minister	Soviet Union	July 21, 1940	Occupation of the Baltic states		
Jüri Uluots	Estonia	President	Soviet Union	July 21, 1940	Occupation of the Baltic states		
Johan Nygaardsvold	Norway	Prime Minister	Nazi Germany	9 April 1940	Operation Weserübung	Prime Minister Nygaardsvold and King Haakon VII would continue to lead the Norwegian government-in-exile, and would be restored to power after the Liberation of Finnmark and Operation Doomsday.	
Haakon VII	Norway	King	Nazi Germany	9 April 1940	Operation Weserübung	Prime Minister Nygaardsvold and King Haakon VII would continue to lead the Norwegian government-in-exile, and would be restored to power after the Liberation of Finnmark and Operation Doomsday.	
Charlotte	Luxembourg	Grand Duchess	Nazi Germany	10 May 1940	Occupation of Luxembourg	Grand Duchess Charlotte and Prime Minister Dupong continued to lead the Luxembourg government in exile in 27 Wilton Crescent in London, and would be restored at the end of the war.	
Pierre Dupong	Luxembourg	Prime Minister	Nazi Germany	10 May 1940	Occupation of Luxembourg	Grand Duchess Charlotte and Prime Minister Dupong continued to lead the Luxembourg government in exile in 27 Wilton Crescent in London, and would be restored at the end of the war.	
Dirk Jan de Geer	Netherlands	Prime Minister	Nazi Germany	15 May 1940	Occupation of the Netherlands	Prime Minister Jan de Geer and Queen Wilhelmina lead the Dutch government in exile in London and would be restored at the end of the war.	
Wilhelmina	Netherlands	Queen	Nazi Germany	15 May 1940	Occupation of the Netherlands	Prime Minister Jan de Geer and Queen Wilhelmina lead the Dutch government in exile in London and would be restored at the end of the war.	
Hubert Pierlot	Belgium	Prime Minister	Nazi Germany	24 May 1940	Invasion of Belgium	Prime Minister Pierlot continued to lead the Belgian government in exile in Eaton Square, London, and would be restored by the liberation of Belgium.	
Albert Lebrun	France	President	Nazi Germany	22 June 1940	Battle of France		
Paul Reynaud	France	Prime Minister	Fascist Italy	22 June 1940	Battle of France		
Emmanouil Tsouderos	Greece	Prime Minister	Nazi Germany	24 May 1941	Occupation of Greece	King George II continued to be recognized by the Greek government-in-exile, and was restored to power after the withdrawal of the Germans, the Greek Civil War, and the 1946 referendum restoring the monarchy.	
George II	Greece	King	Fascist Italy	24 May 1941	Occupation of Greece	King George II continued to be recognized by the Greek government-in-exile, and was restored to power after the withdrawal of the Germans, the Greek Civil War, and the 1946 referendum restoring the monarchy.	
Rashid Ali al-Gaylani	Iraq	Prime Minister	United Kingdom: Mandatory Palestine; British India	2 May 1941	Anglo-Iraqi War		
Peter II	(Kingdom of Yugoslavia) Yugoslavia	King	Nazi Germany	13 April 1941	Occupation of Yugoslavia	King Peter II would continue to lead the Yugoslav government-in-exile headquartered at Claridge's Hotel, London, but would be prevented from returning due to the Allies' recognition of Democratic Federal Yugoslavia.	
Dušan Simović	(Kingdom of Yugoslavia) Yugoslavia	Prime Minister	Fascist Italy	13 April 1941	Occupation of Yugoslavia	King Peter II would continue to lead the Yugoslav government-in-exile headquartered at Claridge's Hotel, London, but would be prevented from returning due to the Allies' recognition of Democratic Federal Yugoslavia.	
Reza Shah Pahlavi	Iran	Shah	Soviet Union	16 September 1941	Anglo-Soviet invasion of Iran	Reza Shah's son Mohammad Reza Pahlavi would come to power after the 1953 Iranian coup d'état.	
Reza Shah Pahlavi	Iran	Shah	United Kingdom	16 September 1941	Anglo-Soviet invasion of Iran	Reza Shah's son Mohammad Reza Pahlavi would come to power after the 1953 Iranian coup d'état.	
Reza Shah Pahlavi	Iran	Shah	Australia	16 September 1941	Anglo-Soviet invasion of Iran	Reza Shah's son Mohammad Reza Pahlavi would come to power after the 1953 Iranian coup d'état.	
Philippe Pétain	Vichy France	Chief of State	United States	June–July 1944	Operation Overlord	Petain fled to Sigmaringen and formed a government-in-exile before being captured by Provisional Government of the French Republic forces and being convicted for collaboration with the Axis Powers. On the account of his service to the country during World War I, de Gaulle commuted the sentence to life in prison. Laval was taken in custody by German forces in August 1944 after refusing to continue to serve the remnants of Vichy France and later fled to Spain, where he asked Franco for asylum. Franco suggested he should move on to a different neutral country, but Laval preferred to stay in Spain, from where he was handed over to the Allies in 1945. Back in France, he was tried and executed.	
Philippe Pétain	Vichy France	Chief of State	United Kingdom	June–July 1944	Operation Overlord		
Philippe Pétain	Vichy France	Chief of State	Canada	June–July 1944	Operation Overlord		
Philippe Pétain	Vichy France	Chief of State	Poland	June–July 1944	Operation Overlord		
Philippe Pétain	Vichy France	Chief of State	Australia	June–July 1944	Operation Overlord		
Pierre Laval	Vichy France	Prime Minister	New Zealand	June–July 1944	Operation Overlord		
Pierre Laval	Vichy France	Prime Minister	Greece	June–July 1944	Operation Overlord		
Pierre Laval	Vichy France	Prime Minister	Luxembourg	June–July 1944	Operation Overlord		
Pierre Laval	Vichy France	Prime Minister	Netherlands	June–July 1944	Operation Overlord		
Pierre Laval	Vichy France	Prime Minister	Norway	June–July 1944	Operation Overlord		
Konstantin Muraviev	Bulgaria	Prime Minister	Soviet Union	9 September 1944	1944 Bulgarian coup d'état	Muraviev was only in charge of the country for a week, from 2 to 9 September and despite trying to cut ties with the Axis, he stopped short of declaring war on Germany until after 5 September, when the USSR used this as a reason to declare war on Bulgaria and install their own government.	
Miklós Horthy	Hungary	Regent	Nazi Germany	15 October 1944	Operation Panzerfaust	After receiving word that Hungary's Regent, Admiral Miklós Horthy, was secretly negotiating his country's surrender to the advancing Red Army, he sent commando leader Otto Skorzeny of the Waffen-SS to capture Horthy and topple his government	
Benito Mussolini	Italian Social Republic	Duce	United States	1 May 1945	Italian Campaign	Benito Mussolini had previously been voted out of office by the Grand Council of Fascism in the Kingdom of Italy and dismissed and arrested on the orders of King Victor Emmanuel III and Pietro Badoglio.	
Benito Mussolini	Italian Social Republic	Duce	United Kingdom	1 May 1945	Italian Campaign	Benito Mussolini had previously been voted out of office by the Grand Council of Fascism in the Kingdom of Italy and dismissed and arrested on the orders of King Victor Emmanuel III and Pietro Badoglio.	
Benito Mussolini	Italian Social Republic	Duce	France	1 May 1945	Italian Campaign	Benito Mussolini had previously been voted out of office by the Grand Council of Fascism in the Kingdom of Italy and dismissed and arrested on the orders of King Victor Emmanuel III and Pietro Badoglio.	
Benito Mussolini	Italian Social Republic	Duce	Canada	1 May 1945	Italian Campaign	Benito Mussolini had previously been voted out of office by the Grand Council of Fascism in the Kingdom of Italy and dismissed and arrested on the orders of King Victor Emmanuel III and Pietro Badoglio.	
Benito Mussolini	Italian Social Republic	Duce	South Africa	1 May 1945	Italian Campaign	Benito Mussolini had previously been voted out of office by the Grand Council of Fascism in the Kingdom of Italy and dismissed and arrested on the orders of King Victor Emmanuel III and Pietro Badoglio.	
Benito Mussolini	Italian Social Republic	Duce	Poland	1 May 1945	Italian Campaign	Benito Mussolini had previously been voted out of office by the Grand Council of Fascism in the Kingdom of Italy and dismissed and arrested on the orders of King Victor Emmanuel III and Pietro Badoglio.	
Benito Mussolini	Italian Social Republic	Duce	Brazil	1 May 1945	Italian Campaign	Benito Mussolini had previously been voted out of office by the Grand Council of Fascism in the Kingdom of Italy and dismissed and arrested on the orders of King Victor Emmanuel III and Pietro Badoglio.	
Benito Mussolini	Italian Social Republic	Duce	Greece	1 May 1945	Italian Campaign	Benito Mussolini had previously been voted out of office by the Grand Council of Fascism in the Kingdom of Italy and dismissed and arrested on the orders of King Victor Emmanuel III and Pietro Badoglio.	
Ferenc Szálasi	Hungary	Leader of the Nation	Soviet Union	7 May 1945	Nagykanizsa–Körmend Offensive		
Ferenc Szálasi	Hungary	Leader of the Nation	Bulgaria	7 May 1945	Nagykanizsa–Körmend Offensive		
Ferenc Szálasi	Hungary	Leader of the Nation	Yugoslavia	7 May 1945	Nagykanizsa–Körmend Offensive		
Ante Pavelić	Croatia	Poglavnik	Soviet Union	7 May 1945	Nagykanizsa–Körmend Offensive	After the capitulation of Germany, Pavelić fled first to Italy and then to South America, where he lived until 1957, when he was shot several times by a Serbian patriot. He moved to Spain, where he died a couple of years later due to the wounds from the assassination attempt	
Vidkun Quisling	Norway	Minister President	Soviet Union	9 May 1945	Petsamo–Kirkenes Offensive	Quisling had served as a puppet head of state under the Reichskommissariat Norwegen. As the Allies were advancing through Norway, Quisling surrendered himself in to the police and was later tried and executed. The word "quisling" became a byword for "collaborator" or "traitor" in several languages since his death	
Vidkun Quisling	Norway	Minister President	Finland	9 May 1945	Petsamo–Kirkenes Offensive	Quisling had served as a puppet head of state under the Reichskommissariat Norwegen. As the Allies were advancing through Norway, Quisling surrendered himself in to the police and was later tried and executed. The word "quisling" became a byword for "collaborator" or "traitor" in several languages since his death	
Vidkun Quisling	Norway	Minister President	United Kingdom	9 May 1945	Operation Doomsday	Quisling had served as a puppet head of state under the Reichskommissariat Norwegen. As the Allies were advancing through Norway, Quisling surrendered himself in to the police and was later tried and executed. The word "quisling" became a byword for "collaborator" or "traitor" in several languages since his death	
Karl Dönitz	Nazi Germany	President	United States	23 May 1945	Western Allied invasion of Germany	Dönitz's predecessor Adolf Hitler had committed suicide eight days earlier to avoid surrender. After the war, he was sentenced to ten years' imprisonment and was for nearly seven decades the only head of state to be convicted by an international tribunal	
Karl Dönitz	Nazi Germany	President	United Kingdom	23 May 1945	Western Allied invasion of Germany	Dönitz's predecessor Adolf Hitler had committed suicide eight days earlier to avoid surrender. After the war, he was sentenced to ten years' imprisonment and was for nearly seven decades the only head of state to be convicted by an international tribunal	
Karl Dönitz	Nazi Germany	President	France	23 May 1945	Western Allied invasion of Germany	Dönitz's predecessor Adolf Hitler had committed suicide eight days earlier to avoid surrender. After the war, he was sentenced to ten years' imprisonment and was for nearly seven decades the only head of state to be convicted by an international tribunal	
Karl Dönitz	Nazi Germany	President	Canada	23 May 1945	Western Allied invasion of Germany	Dönitz's predecessor Adolf Hitler had committed suicide eight days earlier to avoid surrender. After the war, he was sentenced to ten years' imprisonment and was for nearly seven decades the only head of state to be convicted by an international tribunal	
Karl Dönitz	Nazi Germany	President	Australia	23 May 1945	Western Allied invasion of Germany	Dönitz's predecessor Adolf Hitler had committed suicide eight days earlier to avoid surrender. After the war, he was sentenced to ten years' imprisonment and was for nearly seven decades the only head of state to be convicted by an international tribunal	
Karl Dönitz	Nazi Germany	President	New Zealand	23 May 1945	Western Allied invasion of Germany	Dönitz's predecessor Adolf Hitler had committed suicide eight days earlier to avoid surrender. After the war, he was sentenced to ten years' imprisonment and was for nearly seven decades the only head of state to be convicted by an international tribunal	
Karl Dönitz	Nazi Germany	President	Belgium	23 May 1945	Western Allied invasion of Germany	Dönitz's predecessor Adolf Hitler had committed suicide eight days earlier to avoid surrender. After the war, he was sentenced to ten years' imprisonment and was for nearly seven decades the only head of state to be convicted by an international tribunal	
Karl Dönitz	Nazi Germany	President	Netherlands	23 May 1945	Western Allied invasion of Germany	Dönitz's predecessor Adolf Hitler had committed suicide eight days earlier to avoid surrender. After the war, he was sentenced to ten years' imprisonment and was for nearly seven decades the only head of state to be convicted by an international tribunal	
Karl Dönitz	Nazi Germany	President	Luxembourg	23 May 1945	Western Allied invasion of Germany	Dönitz's predecessor Adolf Hitler had committed suicide eight days earlier to avoid surrender. After the war, he was sentenced to ten years' imprisonment and was for nearly seven decades the only head of state to be convicted by an international tribunal	
Karl Dönitz	Nazi Germany	President	Norway	23 May 1945	Western Allied invasion of Germany	Dönitz's predecessor Adolf Hitler had committed suicide eight days earlier to avoid surrender. After the war, he was sentenced to ten years' imprisonment and was for nearly seven decades the only head of state to be convicted by an international tribunal	
Karl Dönitz	Nazi Germany	President	Denmark	23 May 1945	Western Allied invasion of Germany	Dönitz's predecessor Adolf Hitler had committed suicide eight days earlier to avoid surrender. After the war, he was sentenced to ten years' imprisonment and was for nearly seven decades the only head of state to be convicted by an international tribunal	
Karl Dönitz	Nazi Germany	President	Soviet Union	23 May 1945	Eastern Front	Dönitz's predecessor Adolf Hitler had committed suicide eight days earlier to avoid surrender. After the war, he was sentenced to ten years' imprisonment and was for nearly seven decades the only head of state to be convicted by an international tribunal	
Karl Dönitz	Nazi Germany	President	Poland	23 May 1945	Eastern Front	Dönitz's predecessor Adolf Hitler had committed suicide eight days earlier to avoid surrender. After the war, he was sentenced to ten years' imprisonment and was for nearly seven decades the only head of state to be convicted by an international tribunal	
Karl Dönitz	Nazi Germany	President	Czechoslovakia	23 May 1945	Eastern Front	Dönitz's predecessor Adolf Hitler had committed suicide eight days earlier to avoid surrender. After the war, he was sentenced to ten years' imprisonment and was for nearly seven decades the only head of state to be convicted by an international tribunal	
Karl Dönitz	Nazi Germany	President	Romania	23 May 1945	Eastern Front	Dönitz's predecessor Adolf Hitler had committed suicide eight days earlier to avoid surrender. After the war, he was sentenced to ten years' imprisonment and was for nearly seven decades the only head of state to be convicted by an international tribunal	
Karl Dönitz	Nazi Germany	President	Bulgaria	23 May 1945	Eastern Front	Dönitz's predecessor Adolf Hitler had committed suicide eight days earlier to avoid surrender. After the war, he was sentenced to ten years' imprisonment and was for nearly seven decades the only head of state to be convicted by an international tribunal	
Karl Dönitz	Nazi Germany	President	Yugoslavia	23 May 1945	Eastern Front	Dönitz's predecessor Adolf Hitler had committed suicide eight days earlier to avoid surrender. After the war, he was sentenced to ten years' imprisonment and was for nearly seven decades the only head of state to be convicted by an international tribunal	
Karl Dönitz	Nazi Germany	President	Finland	23 May 1945	Lapland War	Dönitz's predecessor Adolf Hitler had committed suicide eight days earlier to avoid surrender. After the war, he was sentenced to ten years' imprisonment and was for nearly seven decades the only head of state to be convicted by an international tribunal	
Aisin-Gioro Puyi	Manchukuo	Emperor	Soviet Union	15 August 1945	Soviet invasion of Manchuria	The Japanese puppet-state of Manchukuo capitulated five days after the Japanese surrender, with Pu Yi imprisoned first by the Soviet and then handed over to China, where he was released in 1959 following a general amnesty. Zhang Jinghui was similarly handed over to China in 1950, dying in prison in 1959, while Demchugdongrub fled to Mongolia before being handed to the Chinese and released 13 years later	
Zhang Jinghui	Manchukuo	Prime Minister	Soviet Union	15 August 1945	Soviet invasion of Manchuria	The Japanese puppet-state of Manchukuo capitulated five days after the Japanese surrender, with Pu Yi imprisoned first by the Soviet and then handed over to China, where he was released in 1959 following a general amnesty. Zhang Jinghui was similarly handed over to China in 1950, dying in prison in 1959, while Demchugdongrub fled to Mongolia before being handed to the Chinese and released 13 years later	
Demchugdongrub	Mengjiang	Chairman of the Military Government	Soviet Union	15 August 1945	Soviet invasion of Manchuria	The Japanese puppet-state of Manchukuo capitulated five days after the Japanese surrender, with Pu Yi imprisoned first by the Soviet and then handed over to China, where he was released in 1959 following a general amnesty. Zhang Jinghui was similarly handed over to China in 1950, dying in prison in 1959, while Demchugdongrub fled to Mongolia before being handed to the Chinese and released 13 years later	
Michael I of Romania	Romania	King	Soviet Union	30 December 1947	Soviet occupation of Romania	Michael was forced to abdicate by Soviet occupation forces and the Romanian Communist Party and left the country. He settled in Switzerland before being allowed back in Romania in 1997	
Edvard Beneš	Czechoslovakia	President	Soviet Union	12 February 1948	1948 Czechoslovak coup d'état	Already ill, Beneš died a few months after the coup	
Osman Ali Khan, Asaf Jah VII	Hyderabad State	Nizam	India	17 September 1948	Operation Polo	Occurred when Hyderabad, a former princely state in British India, attempted to remain independent during the political integration of India.	
Mohammad Mosaddegh	Iran	Prime Minister	United Kingdom	19 August 1953	1953 Iranian coup d'état	Mosaddegh was removed from power during a coup meant to strengthen the monarchical rule of Mohammad Reza Pahlavi, orchestrated by the United Kingdom and the United States	
Mohammad Mosaddegh	Iran	Prime Minister	United States	19 August 1953	1953 Iranian coup d'état	Mosaddegh was removed from power during a coup meant to strengthen the monarchical rule of Mohammad Reza Pahlavi, orchestrated by the United Kingdom and the United States	
Imre Nagy	Hungary	Chairman of the Council of Ministers	Soviet Union	4 November 1956	Hungarian Revolution	The outbreak of the Hungarian Revolution saw Nagy elevated to the position of Prime Minister on 24 October 1956, being removed by the invading Red Army just ten days later. In June of the same year he was tried and executed for treason	
Tenzin Gyatso	Tibet	Dalai Lama	China	30 March 1959	Tibetan uprising	Following the unsuccessful uprising of 1959, the Dalai Lama was forced to flee to India, where set up a government-in-exile	
Muhammad al-Badr	North Yemen	King and Imam	Egypt	26 September 1962	26 September Revolution	The coup was described as Egyptian-sponsored but the extent of Egypt's involvement is disputed. The following civil war caused by a royalist uprising led to open Egyptian involvement which was often described as "Egypt's Vietnam".	
Francisco Caamaño	Dominican Republic	President	United States	3 September 1965	U.S. invasion of the Dominican Republic	Caamaño was one of the leaders in the movement to restore the democratically elected president Juan Bosch, who had been overthrown in a military coup d'état in September, 1963. He briefly became President before being removed by an invasion launched by the United States, who were fearing another Communist state in the Caribbean	
Alexander Dubček	Czechoslovakia	Chairman of the Federal Assembly	Soviet Union	21 August 1968	Warsaw Pact invasion of Czechoslovakia	Dubček attempted to reform the communist government during the Prague Spring but was forced to resign following the Warsaw Pact invasion in August 1968. He later returned to the same position after the Velvet Revolution of 1989	
Alexander Dubček	Czechoslovakia	Chairman of the Federal Assembly	Poland	21 August 1968	Warsaw Pact invasion of Czechoslovakia	Dubček attempted to reform the communist government during the Prague Spring but was forced to resign following the Warsaw Pact invasion in August 1968. He later returned to the same position after the Velvet Revolution of 1989	
Alexander Dubček	Czechoslovakia	Chairman of the Federal Assembly	Hungary	21 August 1968	Warsaw Pact invasion of Czechoslovakia	Dubček attempted to reform the communist government during the Prague Spring but was forced to resign following the Warsaw Pact invasion in August 1968. He later returned to the same position after the Velvet Revolution of 1989	
Alexander Dubček	Czechoslovakia	Chairman of the Federal Assembly	Bulgaria	21 August 1968	Warsaw Pact invasion of Czechoslovakia	Dubček attempted to reform the communist government during the Prague Spring but was forced to resign following the Warsaw Pact invasion in August 1968. He later returned to the same position after the Velvet Revolution of 1989	
Alexander Dubček	Czechoslovakia	Chairman of the Federal Assembly	East Germany	21 August 1968	Warsaw Pact invasion of Czechoslovakia	Dubček attempted to reform the communist government during the Prague Spring but was forced to resign following the Warsaw Pact invasion in August 1968. He later returned to the same position after the Velvet Revolution of 1989	
Philip Effiong	Biafra	President	Nigeria	12 January 1970	Nigerian Civil War	Effiong was only head of state for four days before surrendering to Nigeria. Biafra never received diplomatic recognition from the international community.	
Makarios III	Cyprus	President	Greece	15 July 1974	Cypriot coup d'état	The coup was arranged by the Greek Army in Cyprus, the Cypriot National Guard and the Greek military junta of 1967–1974. The plotters ousted President Makarios III and replaced him with pro-Enosis (Greek irridentist) nationalist Nikos Sampson as dictator. The Sampson regime was described as a puppet state, whose ultimate aim was the annexation of the island by Greece	
Nikos Sampson	Cyprus	Acting President	Turkey	24 July 1974	Turkish invasion of Cyprus	The invasion came after the Greek-backed coup in Cyprus earlier the month. It triggered the downfall of the Greek junta which was already weakened and the creation of a government of national unity under Konstantinos Karamanlis.	
Adamantios Androutsopoulos	Greece	Prime Minister	Turkey	24 July 1974	Turkish invasion of Cyprus	The invasion came after the Greek-backed coup in Cyprus earlier the month. It triggered the downfall of the Greek junta which was already weakened and the creation of a government of national unity under Konstantinos Karamanlis.	
Dương Văn Minh	South Vietnam	President	North Vietnam	30 April 1975	Fall of Saigon	The capture of Saigon, the capital of South Vietnam, by the People's Army of Vietnam marked the end of the Vietnam War and the start of a transition period to the formal reunification of Vietnam into the Socialist Republic of Vietnam	
Vũ Văn Mẫu	South Vietnam	Prime Minister	North Vietnam	30 April 1975	Fall of Saigon	The capture of Saigon, the capital of South Vietnam, by the People's Army of Vietnam marked the end of the Vietnam War and the start of a transition period to the formal reunification of Vietnam into the Socialist Republic of Vietnam	
Francisco Xavier do Amaral	East Timor	President	Indonesia	7 December 1975	Indonesian invasion of East Timor	Occurred several days after East Timor gained independence from the Portuguese colonial empire.	
Pol Pot	Kampuchea	Prime Minister	Vietnam	7 January 1979	Cambodian–Vietnamese War	Pol Pot was removed from office by the Vietnamese invasion, but he remained leader of the Coalition Government of Democratic Kampuchea until 1981 and General Secretary of the Khmer Rouge until 1985.	
Khieu Samphan	Kampuchea	President of the State Presidium	Vietnam	7 January 1979	Cambodian–Vietnamese War	Pol Pot was removed from office by the Vietnamese invasion, but he remained leader of the Coalition Government of Democratic Kampuchea until 1981 and General Secretary of the Khmer Rouge until 1985.	
Idi Amin	Uganda	President	Tanzania	11 April 1979	Fall of Kampala	Amin's reign came to an end when he was ousted by an invading force consisting on Tanzanian troops and the Ugandan National Libation Front recruited from among Ugandan exiles	
Jean-Bédel Bokassa	Central African Empire	Emperor	France	20 September 1979	Operation Barracuda	Emperor Bokassa I was removed during a bloodless coup orchestrated by David Dacko and supported by France while Bokassa was abroad in Libya	
Hafizullah Amin	Afghanistan	Chairman of the Presidium of the Revolutionary Council	Soviet Union	27 December 1979	Operation Storm-333	After just three months in office, Amin was removed by a Russian-backed coup and was soon after killed by Soviet troops	
Rex Hunt	Falkland Islands	Governor	Argentina	2 April 1982	Occupation of the Falkland Islands	Hunt surrendered after the islands were overrun and was restored after Argentina was defeated by Britain in the Falklands War.	
Hudson Austin	Grenada	Chairman of the Revolutionary Military Council	United States	25 October 1983	Operation Urgent Fury	General Austin was in charge of the coup that ousted and executed prime minister Maurice Bishop. Just six days later the United States army invaded and swiftly removed Austin from power	
Manuel Noriega	Panama	Maximum Leader of National Liberation	United States	20 December 1989	Operation Just Cause	In 1988, Noriega was indicted by federal grand juries in Miami and Tampa on charges of racketeering, drug smuggling, and money laundering. Following the 1989 United States invasion of Panama, he was captured and flown to the United States, where he was tried on the Miami indictment.	
Jaber Al-Ahmad Al-Sabah	Kuwait	Emir	Iraq	2 August 1990	Invasion of Kuwait	Emir Jaber and Prime Minister Saad continued to lead the Kuwaiti Government in exile in Ta'if, Saudi Arabia, and were restored by after a U.S.-led coalition defeated Iraq in the Gulf War.	
Saad Al-Salim Al-Sabah	Kuwait	Prime Minister	Iraq	2 August 1990	Invasion of Kuwait	Emir Jaber and Prime Minister Saad continued to lead the Kuwaiti Government in exile in Ta'if, Saudi Arabia, and were restored by after a U.S.-led coalition defeated Iraq in the Gulf War.	
Raoul Cédras	Haiti	Leader of the Military Junta	United States	10 October 1994	Operation Uphold Democracy	Cédras surrendered before the planned invasion actually commenced.	
Raoul Cédras	Haiti	Leader of the Military Junta	Argentina	10 October 1994	Operation Uphold Democracy	Cédras surrendered before the planned invasion actually commenced.	
Raoul Cédras	Haiti	Leader of the Military Junta	Poland	10 October 1994	Operation Uphold Democracy	Cédras surrendered before the planned invasion actually commenced.	
Aslan Maskhadov	Chechen Republic of Ichkeria	President	Russia	30 April 2000	Russian invasion of Chechnya	Following the 1999 Russian apartment bombings and a militant incursion in Dagestan, Russia initiated a "counter-terrorism" invasion of the Chechen Republic of Ichkeria to dismantle the separatist government led by Aslan Maskhadov. Russian forces employed heavy artillery in the Battle of Grozny. And would establish a pro-Moscow administration under Akhmad Kadyrov, which subsequently led to a long-term insurgency. Maskhadov was discovered and killed in Tolstoy-Yurt, a village in northern Chechnya, in March 2005. The Kremlin officially terminated its "counter-terrorism operation" in April 2009, bringing the region under tight control..	
Mullah Omar	Afghanistan	Supreme Leader	United States	13 November 2001	United States invasion of Afghanistan	Omar had not been widely recognized as the leader of the country due to international recognition of the Northern Alliance but had controlled the majority of the country. He continued as the leader of the Taliban and its insurgency during the War in Afghanistan until his death in 2013.	
Mullah Omar	Afghanistan	Supreme Leader	United Kingdom	13 November 2001	United States invasion of Afghanistan	Omar had not been widely recognized as the leader of the country due to international recognition of the Northern Alliance but had controlled the majority of the country. He continued as the leader of the Taliban and its insurgency during the War in Afghanistan until his death in 2013.	
Mullah Omar	Afghanistan	Supreme Leader	Canada	13 November 2001	United States invasion of Afghanistan	Omar had not been widely recognized as the leader of the country due to international recognition of the Northern Alliance but had controlled the majority of the country. He continued as the leader of the Taliban and its insurgency during the War in Afghanistan until his death in 2013.	
Mullah Omar	Afghanistan	Supreme Leader	Australia	13 November 2001	United States invasion of Afghanistan	Omar had not been widely recognized as the leader of the country due to international recognition of the Northern Alliance but had controlled the majority of the country. He continued as the leader of the Taliban and its insurgency during the War in Afghanistan until his death in 2013.	
Saddam Hussein	Iraq	President	United States	29 April 2003	Invasion of Iraq	Baathist Iraq had been required to disclose its weapons of mass destruction programs after the Persian Gulf War, but had repeatedly evaded disarmament inspectors during the 1990s. The U.N. Security Council unanimously passed Resolution 1441 in 2002 requiring Iraq to comply with UNMOVIC inspectors under the leadership of Hans Blix. The United States, the United Kingdom, and Spain advocated a resolution declaring Iraq in non-compliance with the inspections but were opposed by France, Germany, and Russia. The United States instead decided to act outside of the United Nations framework to assemble a "coalition of the willing" and delivered a 48-hour ultimatum to Saddam to step down by March 19, 2003. The subsequent invasion took control of Iraq by May 1, 2003, and Saddam Hussein was captured in Operation Red Dawn on December 13, 2003, although no weapons of mass destruction were recovered. He was tried and convicted for crimes against humanity by the Iraqi Special Tribunal and executed by hanging in 2006.	
Saddam Hussein	Iraq	President	United Kingdom	29 April 2003	Invasion of Iraq		
Saddam Hussein	Iraq	President	Australia	29 April 2003	Invasion of Iraq		
Saddam Hussein	Iraq	President	Poland	29 April 2003	Invasion of Iraq		
Muammar Gaddafi	Libya	Leader	NATO: Belgium; Bulgaria; Canada; Denmark; France; Greece; Italy; Netherlands; Norway; Romania; Spain; Sweden; Turkey; United Kingdom; United States	20 October 2011	Operation Unified Protector	Protests against Gaddafi in Libya began during the Arab Spring and were coordinated by the National Transitional Council, which escalated into civil war following violent repression from the government. Libya received sanctions from the United States and the European Union, while the International Criminal Court issued an arrest warrant against Gaddafi. The U.N. Security Council authorized a no-fly zone over Libya after the Battle of Ajdabiya, and the NATO-led coalition launched air strikes against the Libyan Air Force. After Gaddafi loyalists gained the upper hand the air strikes intensified in what some interpreted as a move towards decapitation strikes while France, Italy, and the United Kingdom sent military advisors to the National Transitional Council. Eventually the TNC gained the upper hand in the conflict, captured the capital city of Tripoli, and achieved diplomatic recognition from the United Nations. Gaddafi was forced to flee and was killed by rebels in Sirte.	
Muammar Gaddafi	Libya	Leader	Jordan	20 October 2011	2011 military intervention in Libya		
Muammar Gaddafi	Libya	Leader	Qatar	20 October 2011	2011 military intervention in Libya		
Muammar Gaddafi	Libya	Leader	Sweden	20 October 2011	2011 military intervention in Libya		
Muammar Gaddafi	Libya	Leader	United Arab Emirates	20 October 2011	2011 military intervention in Libya		
Yahya Jammeh	Gambia	President	Senegal	21 January 2017	ECOWAS military intervention in the Gambia	Adama Barrow had won the 2016 Gambian presidential election, but Jammeh had refused to step down.	
Yahya Jammeh	Gambia	President	Nigeria	21 January 2017	ECOWAS military intervention in the Gambia	Adama Barrow had won the 2016 Gambian presidential election, but Jammeh had refused to step down.	
Yahya Jammeh	Gambia	President	Ghana	21 January 2017	ECOWAS military intervention in the Gambia	Adama Barrow had won the 2016 Gambian presidential election, but Jammeh had refused to step down.	
Yahya Jammeh	Gambia	President	Mali	21 January 2017	ECOWAS military intervention in the Gambia	Adama Barrow had won the 2016 Gambian presidential election, but Jammeh had refused to step down.	
Yahya Jammeh	Gambia	President	Togo	21 January 2017	ECOWAS military intervention in the Gambia	Adama Barrow had won the 2016 Gambian presidential election, but Jammeh had refused to step down.	
Saleh Ali al-Sammad	Yemen (Note: He was the part of the Supreme Political Council, the Houthi-led government in rebellion against the Republic of Yemen.)	Chairman of the Supreme Political Council	Saudi Arabia	19 April 2018	Saudi-led intervention in the Yemeni civil war	Al-Sammad was targeted and assassinated by a Saudi drone attack.	
Samvel Shahramanyan	Artsakh (Note: Nagorno-Karabakh was a disputed region being claimed by Azerbaijan and Artsakh never received international recognition but was a de facto independent state since the First Nagorno-Karabakh War.)	President	Azerbaijan	20 September 2023	Third Nagorno-Karabakh War	The de facto regime officially dissolved on 28 September but their leaders later declared a government in exile. The separatist region was annexed by Azerbaijan.	
Artur Harutyunyan	Artsakh	State Minister	Azerbaijan	20 September 2023	Third Nagorno-Karabakh War	The de facto regime officially dissolved on 28 September but their leaders later declared a government in exile. The separatist region was annexed by Azerbaijan.	
Yahya Sinwar	(Palestine) Gaza Strip	Leader of Hamas	Israel	16 October 2024	Killing of Yahya Sinwar	Sinwar was killed by Israeli forces during the Gaza war.	
Issam al-Da'alis	(Palestine) Gaza Strip	Prime Minister	Israel	18 March 2025	Operation Might and Sword	Al-Da'alis was targeted and assassinated by Israeli airstrikes.	
Ahmed al-Rahawi	Yemen	Prime Minister	Israel	28 August 2025	Operation Lucky Drop	Al-Rahawi was targeted and assassinated by Israeli airstrikes.	
Nicolás Maduro	Venezuela	President	United States	3 January 2026	2026 United States intervention in Venezuela	In 2025, the United States under the 2nd Trump administration launched a military campaign in the Caribbean Sea amidst concerns of maritime drug trafficking in Latin America. Trump had declared Venezuelan airspace closed following US aerial campaigns and deployment of US navy personnel in the Caribbean. In 2026, following months of preparation, Trump gave an order to carry out strikes on Venezuelan territory, resulting in explosions reported in areas around Venezuela's capital city Caracas. After a helicopter raid by the United States at Fuerte Tiuna, Nicolas Maduro and his wife Cilia Flores were captured by US special forces and transferred out of the country on board of the USS Iwo Jima, and transported to New York City, where he was indicted on criminal charges for narco-terrorism.	
Ali Khamenei	Iran	Supreme Leader	United States	28 February 2026	Assassination of Ali Khamenei	Assassinated in the 2026 Israeli–United States strikes on Iran in Tehran	
Ali Khamenei	Iran	Supreme Leader	Israel	28 February 2026	Assassination of Ali Khamenei	Assassinated in the 2026 Israeli–United States strikes on Iran in Tehran	
