= World War I in Albania =

- Part of the Balkans theatre of World War I and the collapse of the Principality of Albania
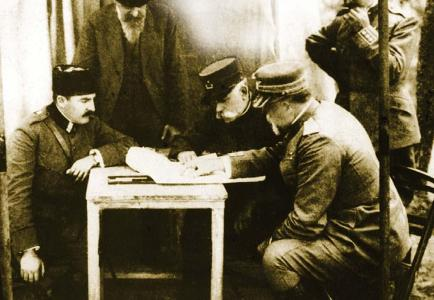
- Esad Toptani in Salonika
Date	July 28, 1914 – 11 November 1918
Location	Albania
Result	Entente victory

Belligerents
Entente: Serbia; Montenegro; France: Autonomous Province of Korçë; United Kingdom; Greece; Italy: Italian-occupied Albania; Senate of Central Albania (until 1916); Albanian Muslim rebels (until 14 November 1914) Anti-Austro-Hungarian Albanian guerrillas (until 1918)	Central Powers: Austria-Hungary: Austro-Hungarian occupied part of Albania (Note: The largest part of Albania was occupied by Austria-Hungary. Albania was considered a Besetztes Freundesland (Friendly Occupied Land). Austria-Hungary left the local administration in place, created an Albanian gendarmerie and opened schools. The development of proper Albanian language and spelling was encouraged to limit Italian influences. They also built roads and other infrastructure. Less popular was their attempt to confiscate weapons that were ubiquitous among the civilian population. Several thousand Albanians nevertheless fought on the side of Austria-Hungary against the Allies, including when the Italian army landed at Durazzo.); Bulgaria; Germany; Ottoman Empire (Principality of Albania) Albanian volunteers and irregulars Principality of Albania (1914): Catholic Albanian tribes; Albanian Muslim rebels (after 14 November 1914) Anti-Serbian Albanian irregulars (1915–1916)

Commanders and leaders
(Kingdom of Serbia) Radomir Putnik (French Third Republic) Maurice Sarrail (Kingdom of Greece) Georgios Kosmas (Kingdom of Italy) Settimio Piacentini Essad Toptani (until 1916); Haxhi Qamili (until 14 November 1914) Azem Galica (until 1918) Shaban Polluzha (until 1918)	(Austria-Hungary) Hermann Kövess von Kövessháza (German Empire) August von Mackensen (Tsardom of Bulgaria (1908–1946)) Georgi Todorov (Principality of Albania) Ahmet Zog Wilhelm of Wied (until 1914); Prenk Bib Doda Haxhi Qamili (after 14 November 1914) Isa Boletini † Bajram Curri

In World War I, Albania was an independent state, having gained independence from the Ottoman Empire on 28 November 1912, during the First Balkan War. It was recognized by the Great Powers as the Principality of Albania, after the Ottoman Empire officially renounced all its rights in May 1913. Being a fledgling new country, it quickly unravelled and just a few months after taking power, its German ruler, Prince Wilhelm, was forced to flee. After World War I broke out, anarchy took hold of the country as tribes and regions rebelled against central rule. To protect the Greek minority, Greek control was established in the southern districts replacing the Northern Epirote units beginning in October 1914. In response to this, Italy, although officially neutral at the time, also sent troops into the port of Vlorë, while Serbia and Montenegro took control of northern regions. In 1915 Serbia was overrun by combined German, Austro-Hungarian, and Bulgarian forces; the Serbian army retreated across the mountain passes of northern Albania, towards the Adriatic. Italian troops drove the Greeks from southern Albania and brought almost all Albanian territory under their control. Austrian forces invaded in June 1916; Austro-Hungarian forces remained in Albania until the end of the war when a multinational Allied force broke through and pushed them out in 1918.

== Background ==
Albania declared its independence only two years before World War I. In the aftermath of the Balkan Wars, Serbia, Montenegro and Greece all occupied and claimed parts of Albania. It was decided that Wilhelm of Wied, a German prince, would become the leader of the new Principality of Albania. The principality under Wilhelm was established on 21 February 1914 and Prince Wilhelm arrived in Albania at his provisional capital of Durrës on 7 March 1914 along with the royal family. The security of Albania was to be provided by an International Gendarmerie commanded by Dutch officers. Inside Albania he was called King Wilhelm; outside Albania, Prince Wilhelm.

The southern part of the country, Northern Epirus, which had a large Greek population, grated at being part of Albania and when the Greek soldiers left, it rose up against William. Under pressure from the great powers the Greeks backed down on independence demands and negotiations were carried out on the island of Corfu, where on 17 May 1914 Albanian and Epirote representatives signed an agreement known as the Protocol of Corfu. According to its terms, Northern Epirus would acquire complete autonomous existence (as a corpus separatum) under the nominal Albanian sovereignty of Prince William. The agreement of the Protocol was ratified by the representatives of the Great Powers at Athens on 18 June and by the Albanian government on 23 June.

=== Revolt against Prince William ===
On 7 March, one month after accepting the throne, King William arrived in his provisional capital of Durrës and started to organise his government, appointing Turhan Pasha Përmeti to form the first Albanian cabinet. This first cabinet was dominated by members of the nobility (Essad Pasha Toptani, defence and foreign affairs, George Adamidi bey Frachery, finances, and Aziz pacha Vrioni, agriculture).

His brief reign proved a turbulent one. Immediately following his arrival Muslim unrest broke out in central Albania, influenced by Ottoman propaganda which portrayed the new regime as a tool of the Christian powers and the large landowners. By early May 1914, the discontent had evolved into a general revolt led by Haxhi Qamili and other Muslim clerics. The aim of the rebels was to restore Ottoman rule over Albania, and they violently rejected Albanian nationalism and secularism.

There are differing accounts as to the exact nature of Toptani's involvement in the uprising. Some sources indicate that he had a leading role in the uprising from the beginning, yet others describe the rebels as explicitly anti-Toptani. In any case, and regardless of whether he actually enjoyed widespread support among the rebels, Toptani wanted to take advantage of the chaos to oust Prince Wilhelm and seize power for himself, and was backed by Italy, which viewed Wilhelm as too pro-Austrian. Dutch officers led by Lodewijk Thomson who were stationed in Albania as part of the ICC ultimately decided to have Toptani arrested, despite Wilhelm remaining indecisive on the matter. On 19 May, Toptani's house was raided by government forces and he surrendered; the following day he was exiled to Italy.

== World War I ==
War broke out in Europe on July 28, 1914, with Albania continuing to be in disarray. Throughout the war, occupying forces, of both Central and Allied powers, massacred the Albanian population on multiple occasions.

=== Departure of Prince Wilhelm (September 1914) ===
The outbreak of World War I presented more problems for Prince William as Austria-Hungary demanded that he send Albanian soldiers to fight alongside them. When he refused, citing the neutrality of Albania in the Treaty of London, the remuneration that he had been receiving was cut off.

With the Muslim rebels placing Durrës under siege for months, and under overwhelming pressure, Wilhelm evacuated Albania on 3 September 1914. On 7 September, Durrës finally fell to the rebels. With these events, remaining central authority crumbled and any sense of national unity in Albania evaporated.

=== Establishment of the Senate of Central Albania (September–October 1914) ===
The "Senate of Central Albania" was the polity that was formed by the Muslim insurgents after their capture of Durrës on 7 September 1914. Inside the city, the victorious rebels hoisted the Ottoman flag, began imprisoning supporters of Wilhelm, and declared that they would seek to install a Muslim prince. Prince Şehzade Mehmed Burhaneddin, a son of the former Ottoman sultan Abdul Hamid II, was invited to take up this position, but this proposal never materialized. The vast majority of the population living in the northern and the southern part of Albania disassociated themselves from the Senate of Central Albania.

The Senate apparently dropped its plans for a "Muslim prince" and invited Essad Toptani to return to Albania and take over as leader. Toptani had been in France when World War I broke out and immediately left for Albania, seeking to take power and align Albania with the Entente Powers. Along the way, he stopped at Serbia and signed the Treaty of Niš with the Serbian prime minister Nikola Pašić on 17 September. The treaty envisioned a Serb-Albanian alliance that would be implemented with Toptani returning to Albania and being elected as leader. On 19 September, with full Serbian support, Toptani returned to Albania. He went to the Dibër region, where he gathered a force of 4,000 volunteers, and peacefully entered Durrës at the beginning of October 1914. On 5 October, with the backing of the Senate, Toptani proclaimed himself as prime minister and president, setting up the Toptani Government, considered the 3rd ruling government of Albania. Immediately afterwards, he declared war on Austria-Hungary to show he was on the side of the Entente.

Toptani was aware that the vast majority of the population governed by the Senate of Central Albania remained pro-Ottoman (the Ottoman Empire was neutral at this point in the war). Therefore, he did not question the Senate's pro-Ottoman policy nor its nominal declaration that the Ottoman sultan (Mehmed V) had suzerainty over Albania.

=== Greek occupation of Northern Epirus (October 1914) ===
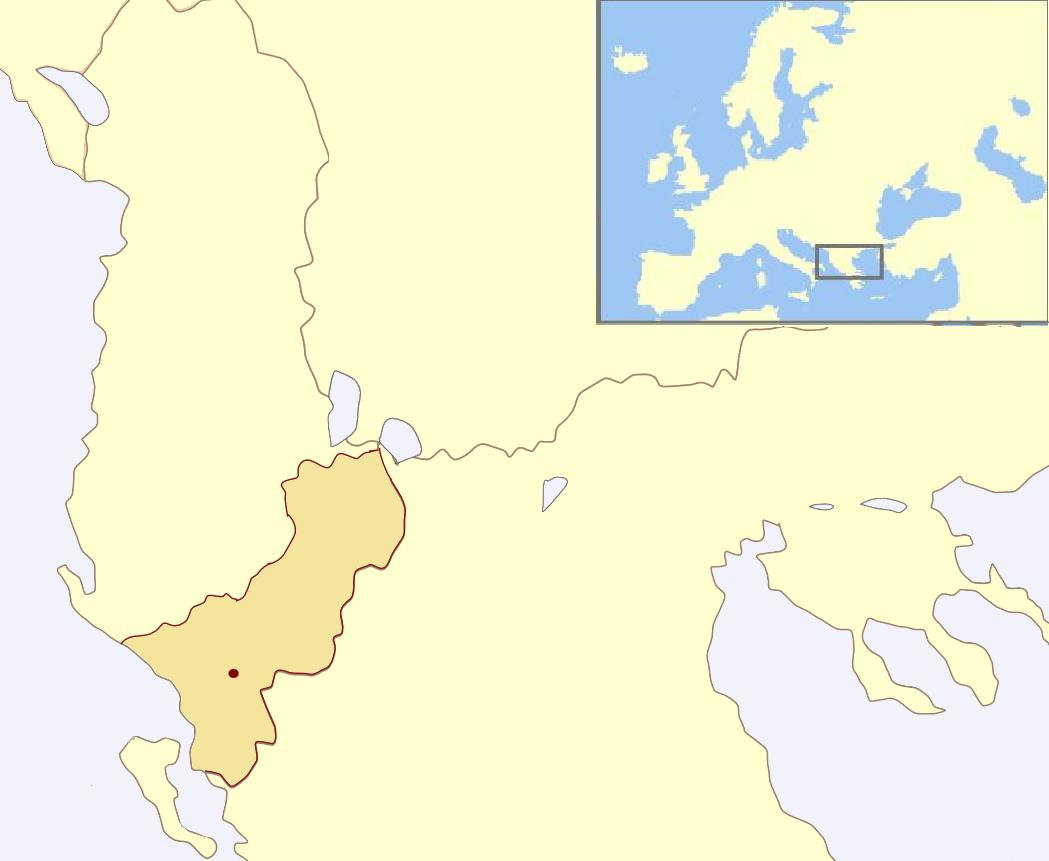
Map of the territory that was claimed as part of the Autonomous Republic of Northern Epirus

In the following days after Prince Wilhelm's departure, an Epirote unit launched an attack on the Albanian garrison in Berat without approval from the provisional government, managing to capture its citadel for several days, while Albanian troops loyal to Essad Pasha initiated small-scale armed operations. These events worried Greek Prime Minister Eleftherios Venizelos, as well as the possibility that the unstable situation could spill over outside Albania, triggering a wider conflict. On October 27, 1914, after receiving the approval of the Great Powers the Greek Army's V Army Corps entered the area for a second time. The provisional government of Northern Epirus formally ceased to exist, declaring that it had accomplished its objectives. Greek troops crossed the southern Albanian border at the end of October 1914, officially reoccupying southern Albania, exclusive of Vlorë, and establishing a military administration by 27 October 1914. The Italians were not happy with the Greek occupation and sent in Italian marines to occupy Vlorë, or Avlona, or Valona, as they called it. On October 31 the Italians seized the strategic island of Saseno or Sazan Island. In December Italy reiterated that Albania would remain neutral as stated at the London Conference and that Italian bluejackets were landed at Valona with this objective.

=== Failed revolt against Toptani (October 1914–June 1915) ===
The Ottoman Empire declared war against the Entente on 31 October 1914. This shattered Toptani's balance between his pro-Entente administration and his overtures to the pro-Ottoman majority of Central Albania. Emboldened especially by the Ottoman declaration of jihad against the Entente (14 November), a Muslim revolt occurred once more, this time starting from the Krujë area. These rebels were extremely anti-Serbian and influenced by Ottoman propaganda which branded Toptani as a traitor to Islam and called for the reconquest of Kosovo from Serbia. Haxhi Qamili returned to become one of the commanders of this new revolt.

These Krujë rebels significantly jeopardized Toptani's position. Many of his followers, swayed by the rebels' rhetoric, defected over to their side. The Central Powers actively supported them, with Ottoman officers arriving in the region to command rebel forces, and Austria-Hungary regularly supplying the rebels with money, weapons, and ammunition. The Krujë rebels also began conducting cross-border raids into Serbia alongside Bulgarian irregulars.

The Krujë rebels continued to expand their territorial gains at the expense of the Senate of Central Albania. Under significant pressure, Toptani requested multiple times for both Serbia and Greece to come to his aid. Seeking to placate Greece, he recognized Greek control of Northern Epirus in a secret agreement. Serbia finally ordered preparations for an intervention in support of the Senate to be made in December 1914, but this was delayed significantly by the concerns of fellow Entente member Russia that operations in Albania might distract from the Austro-Hungarian front and appear to challenge the Italian interests in the country. By then, the Senate- just like Prince Wilhelm's administration before it- had been stripped of all territorial control outside of Durrës, which was under constant siege by the Krujë rebels. Only the Italian navy, present in the adjacent bay, was helping defend Durrës from the rebels. In May 1915, Qamili was elected as leader of the rebels, marking his second time leading a pro-Ottoman revolt in Albania.

Under the secret Treaty of London signed in April 1915, Triple Entente powers promised Italy that it would gain Vlorë (Valona) and the island of Saseno in exchange for entering the war against Austria-Hungary. It was also prospected the reduction of Albania to a tiny Albanian state that would be represented by Italy in its relations with the other major powers, since Serbia and Montenegro were promised much of northern Albania, while Greece was promised much of the country's southern half.

After months of delay, the Serbian intervention finally got underway at the beginning of June 1915. The Serbs organized a massive three-pronged offensive into Albania and successfully crushed the insurgency, relieving Toptani. The defeated Qamili and his fellow rebel leaders were sent as prisoners to Durrës, where they were hanged. A special "Albanian Detachment" was set up by the Serbs to completely pacify Albania and consolidate Toptani's authority.

The Serbian intervention was strongly opposed by Italy and other Entente members, but Serbia stated that these were temporary actions and that its troops would withdraw from Albania as soon as Toptani's rule over the country was consolidated.

On 28 June 1915, Toptani and the Serbian interior minister signed a treaty aiming to set up a Serbian-Albanian union with an envisioned joint army, customs administration, national bank, and foreign missions, with Toptani being recognized as prince over Albania, and with Serbian forces remaining in Albania for the foreseeable future in order to support Toptani and eliminate common enemies.

=== Serbian retreat (late 1915–early 1916) ===
As anarchy grew in Northern Albania and the Greeks moved into the South, Italy sent its troops to occupy Vlorë while Serbia and Montenegro occupied parts of northern Albania. Successful defensive moves during the Serbian Campaign of World War I kept the Central Powers out of Albania until 1915. Bulgaria was finally coaxed into entering the War on the side of the Central Powers and the Austro-Hungarians and Germans began their attack against Serbia on October 7 while on October 14, 1915, the Bulgarian Army attacked from two directions sending the Serbian armies into disarray.

After attacks from both Bulgaria and Austria, Serbian army leader Marshal Putnik ordered a full retreat, south and west through Montenegro and into Albania. The weather was terrible, the roads poor, and the army had to help the tens of thousands of civilians who retreated with them with almost no supplies or food left. But the bad weather and poor roads worked for the refugees as well, as the Central Powers forces could not press them hard enough, and so they evaded capture. Many of the fleeing soldiers and civilians did not make it to the coast, though – they were lost to hunger, disease, attacks by enemy forces and Albanian tribal bands.

The Toptani government provided support to the retreating Serbian army when it could, and Toptani's forces engaged in skirmishes with the Albanian irregulars attacking the Serbians.

However, with Austro-Hungarian forces on the verge of taking Durrës, Toptani and several hundred of his personnel evacuated out of the country in February 1916; prior to his departure he declared war on the Central Powers (in October 1914 he had declared war only on Austria-Hungary). With the support of Serbia, Greece, and France, Toptani's government was recognized as a legitimate government-in-exile. However, Toptani was ultimately marginalized as Albania became a battleground between the Entente and the Central Powers.

The circumstances of the retreat were disastrous, and all told, only some 155,000 Serbs, mostly soldiers, reached the coast of the Adriatic Sea, and embarked on Italian transport ships that carried the army to various Greek islands (many to Corfu) before being sent to Salonika. The evacuation of the Serbian army from Albania was completed on 10 February 1916. In the Serb's wake came the armies of Austria-Hungary and Bulgaria. They would occupy most of Albania until the Vardar Offensive of September 1918.

=== Austro-Hungarian occupation of Albania (1916–1918) ===
Occupation of Albania in 1916.

The largest part of Albania was occupied by Austria-Hungary. Albania was considered a Besetztes Freundesland (Friendly Occupied Country). The Austro-Hungarians left the local administration in place, formed an Albanian gendarmerie and opened schools. The development of a proper Albanian language and orthography was promoted to reduce Italian influences. They also built roads and other infrastructure. Less popular was their attempt to confiscate weapons, which were all-present amongst the civilian population. Nevertheless, several thousand Albanians fought on the side of the Austro-Hungarians against the Allies, including when the Italian Army landed at Durazzo.

The Military Administration was established at Scutari.

The involved Austro-Hungarian Military Commanders were:

- Hermann Kövess von Kövessháza (February 1916 – March 1916), commander of the 3rd Army
- Ignaz Trollmann (March 1916 – October 1917), commander of the XIX Corps
- Ludwig Können-Horák (October 1917 – July 1918), commander of the XIX Corps
- Karl von Pflanzer-Baltin (July 1918 – October 1918), commander of Army Group Albania.

The civil administrator was August Ritter von Kral.

=== Bulgarian occupation of Albania (1916–1917) ===
On December 10, 1915, the Bulgarian army crossed the Drin river, entered Albania, and attacked the positions of the retreating Serbian army. Firstly the Bulgarian army advanced into the valley of river Mat, threatening to capture Shkodra and Lezhë.

There was a rivalry between the Kingdom of Bulgaria and Austria-Hungary in establishing their influence in Albania. Attempting to establish its influence in Albania, Bulgaria allowed Ahmed Zogu to establish his administration in Elbasan and supported him in his attempts to revive support for the regime of Wilhelm of Wied. The double invasion by Austria-Hungary and Kingdom of Bulgaria and a lack of support by the Kingdom of Serbia or Italy, forced Essad Pasha Toptani to leave Albania on February 24, 1916, when he again declared war against Austria-Hungary.

In September 1917 the French troops commanded by general Maurice Sarrail undertook an action against the armies of Austria-Hungary and Bulgaria in Albania. Although the armies of Bulgaria and Austria-Hungary were joined by Albanians, led by Hysejn Nikolica, French troops captured Pogradec, ending the Bulgarian occupation of Albania.

=== French and Italian protectorate over Southern Albania (Autumn 1916) ===
In May 1916, the Italian XVI Corps, some 100,000 men under the command of General Settimio Piacentini, returned and occupied the region of southern Albania by the autumn 1916, while the French army occupied Korçë and its surrounding areas on November 29, 1916. The Italian (in Gjirokastër) and French forces (in Korçë), according mainly to the development of the Balkan Front, entered the area of former Autonomous Republic of Northern Epirus (controlled by the Greek minority) in autumn 1916, after approval of the Triple Entente.

The establishment of the Autonomous Albanian Republic of Korçë was done on December 10, 1916, by French authorities with a protocol, according to which an autonomous province would be established on the territories of Korçë, Bilishti, Kolonja, Opar and Gora in eastern Albania.

On December 12, 1916, Italy asked for explanations from the Quai d'Orsay, through its ambassador, because the establishment of the Autonomous Albanian Republic of Korçë violated the Treaty of London. Austria-Hungary used French precedent in Korçë to justify the proclamation of independence of Albania under its protectorate on January 3, 1917, in Shkodra.

The Kingdom of Italy did the same when proclaiming independence of Albania under its protectorate on June 23, 1917, in Gjirokastra. General Giacinto Ferrero proclaimed on that day the Italian Protectorate and the next weeks entered Greece and occupied Ioannina in Epirus. Neither Great Britain nor France had been consulted beforehand, and they did not give any official recognition to the Italian Protectorate. This Albanian republic under the leadership of Turhan Përmeti, protected by 100,000 soldiers of the Italian Army, adopted officially a red flag with a black eagle in the middle, but raised a storm of protests, even in the Italian Parliament.

In autumn 1918, the Italians expanded their Protectorate (without adding anything officially to Albania) to areas of northern Greece (around Kastoria) and western Macedonia (around Bitola), conquered from the Bulgarians and Ottomans. On September 25 the Italian 35th Division reached and occupied Krusevo deep inside western Macedonia.

=== Macedonian Front (1916–1918) ===
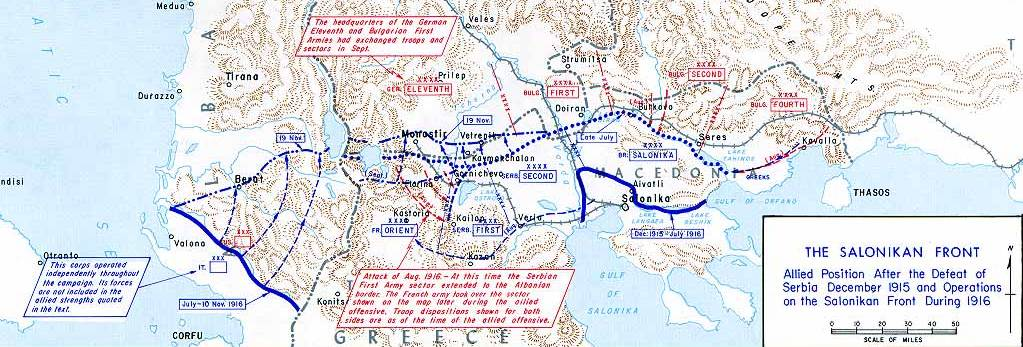
The movement of armies on the Macedonian Front

The Macedonian front, also known as the Salonika Front, of World War I was formed as a result of an attempt by the Allied Powers to aid Serbia. The Allies were able to move the Serbian Army from Corfu to regions of Greece and Albania where eventually, a stable front was established, running from the Albanian Adriatic coast to the Struma River, pitting a multinational Allied force against the Bulgarian Army, which was at various times bolstered with smaller units from the remaining Central Powers. The Macedonian Front remained quite stable, despite local actions, until the great Allied offensive in September 1918.

In September 1918, Entente forces finally broke through the Central Powers' lines north of Thessaloniki and within days Austro-Hungarian forces began to withdraw from Albania. On October 2, 1918, the city of Durrës was shelled on the orders of Louis Franchet d'Espèrey, during the Battle of Durazzo. According to d'Espèrey, the Port of Durrës, if not destroyed, would have served the evacuation of the Bulgarian and German armies, involved in World War I. When the war ended on 11 November 1918, Italy's army had occupied most of Albania; Serbia held much of the country's northern mountains; Greece occupied a sliver of land within Albania's 1913 borders; and French forces occupied Korçë and Shkodër as well as other regions with sizeable Albanian populations.

== Aftermath ==
Albania's political confusion continued in the aftermath of World War I. The country lacked a single recognised government, and Albanians had reasonable fears that Italy, Yugoslavia, and Greece would extinguish Albania's independence and carve up the country. Italian forces controlled Albanian political activity in the areas that they occupied. The Serbs, who largely dictated Yugoslavia's foreign policy after World War I, strove to take over northern Albania, and the Greeks sought to control southern Albania.

In 1918, the Serbian army devastated 150 villages in the Drin Valley in northern Albania. There were series of massacres carried out in the regions of Podgor, Rozaj, Gjakova, Rugova, and Gusinje and Plav with the goal of suppressing the local resistance movement.

US President Woodrow Wilson supported Albanian sovereignty and independence. The United States underscored its support for Albania by recognising an official Albanian representative to Washington, DC, and on December 17, 1920, the League of Nations recognised Albania's sovereignty by admitting it as a full member. The country's borders, however, remained unsettled.

In 1920, the Italians left Vlora and annexed Saseno after clashes with Albanian volunteers. Instability in the country came to an end when the Parliament abolished the Principality of Albania and proclaimed the Republic, vesting dictatorial powers into the new President Ahmet Zogu.

== Sources ==
- GDF (2014). "War in 1918 Albania" (in Italian). lagrandeguerra.net.
- Guy, Nicola (2007). "The Albanian Question in British Policy and the Italian Intervention, August 1914 – April 1915". Diplomacy & Statecraft. 18 (1): 109–131. doi:10.1080/09592290601163035. S2CID 153894515.
- Heaton-Armstrong, Duncan (2005). "An Uprising in the Six-Month Kingdom". Gervase Belfield and Bejtullah Destani (IB Tauris, in association with the Centre for Albanian Studies). Archived from the original on July 23, 2011.
- Kabashi, Gezim (December 24, 2012). "Fotot e Rralla – Bombardimi i Durresit me 2 Tetor 1918" [Rare Photos – Bombing of Durrës on October 2, 1918]. Gazeta e Durresit. Archived from the original on 2014-10-24.
- Kola, Paulin (2003). The Search for Greater Albania. C. Hurst & Co. Publishers. ISBN 9781850655961. - Total pages: 416
- Leon, George B. (January 1970). "Greece and the Albanian Question at the Outbreak of the First World War". Institute for Balkan Studies. 11–12 (1): 61–80.
- Miller, William (1966). The Ottoman Empire and Its Successors, 1801–1927. Taylor & Francis Group. ISBN 9780714619743. - Total pages: 616
- The New York Sun (November 1, 1914). "Italy Occupies Saseno". The New York Sun.
- New York Times (October 23, 1914). "Albanian army led by young american". The New York Times.
- New-York Tribune (December 28, 1914). "Italy Notifies the Powers Albania Shall Not Join War". New-York Tribune.
- Ollé, Jaume (July 15, 1996). "Republic of Korçë (1917-1918)". flagspot.net.
- Pearson, Owen (2004). Albania in the Twentieth Century, A History: Volume I: Albania and King Zog, 1908–39. I.B. Tauris. ISBN 9781845110130. - Total pages: 585
- Popescu, Stefan (2014). "Les Français et la République de Kortcha". Guerres Mondiales et Conflits Contemporains. 213: 77–87. doi:10.3917/gmcc.213.0077. "La signature de ce Protocole contrevient aux stipulations du traité de Londres ...Par conséquent, l'Italie demanda des explications au quai d'Orsay, par l'intermédiaire de son ambassadeur, le 12 décembre 1916."
- Ruches, Pyrrhus J. (1965). Albania's Captives. Argonaut. - Total pages: 213
- storiologia.it (2014). "General Ferrero and Albania (in Italian)". storiologia.it.
- Stickney, Edith Pierpont (1924). Southern Albania, 1912–1923. Stanford University Press. ISBN 9780804761710.
- Thomas, Nigel; Babac, Dušan (2001). Armies in the Balkans 1914-18. Osprey Publishing. ISBN 9781841761947. - Total pages: 48
- Tucker, Spencer; Roberts, Priscilla Mary (2005). Encyclopedia of World War I. Clio Press. ISBN 9781851094202. - Total pages: 1661
- Young, Antonia; Hodgson, John; Young, Nigel (1997). Albania. Clio Press. ISBN 9781851092604. - Total pages: 293
- Richard C. Hall (9 October 2014). War in the Balkans: An Encyclopedic History from the Fall of the Ottoman Empire to the Breakup of Yugoslavia. ABC-CLIO. ISBN 978-1-61069-031-7.
- Encyclopedia 1914–1918 (2015). "Albania: Besetztes Freundesland". encyclopedia.1914-1918-online.net.
