= Collapse of the Principality of Albania =

1914 conflict

- Part of the Balkan Front of World War I
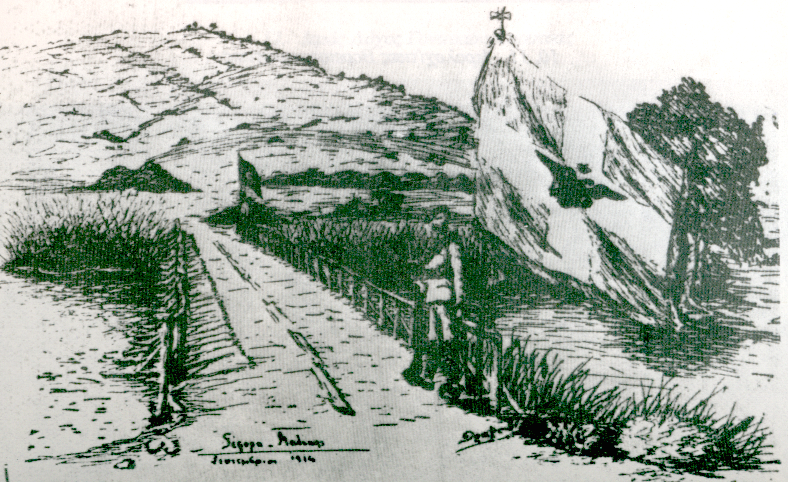
- Depiction of the border crossing between the Senate of Central Albania and the Autonomous Republic of Northern Epirus in September 1914.
Date	28 February 1914 (Note: Establishment of the Autonomous Republic of Northern Epirus) – 2 August 1920 (Note: End of the Vlora War)
Location	Principality of Albania
Result	Gradual reunification of Albania after the end of World War I; Albania regains independence with the end of the Vlora War; Establishment of the Albanian Republic under Ahmet Zogu in 1925

Belligerents
Principality of Albania (Note: until September 1914): ICC; International Gendarmerie; Dutch forces; German forces; Austro-Hungarian forces; Romanian volunteers; Catholic Albanian tribes; Shkodër autonomous council; Mirdita region; Delvina Government	Senate of Central Albania (Note: after November 1914); Toptani Government; Serbia: Italy; Italian-occupied Albania; Government of Durrës; France; Autonomous Province of Korçë; Montenegro	Pro-Ottoman Albanian Muslim rebels; General Council; Senate of Central Albania (Note: Until November 1914); Union of Krujë; Central Powers; Ottoman Empire; Austria-Hungary; Bulgaria	Northern Epirus; Greece

In early 1914, the newly established Principality of Albania entered a period of violent political collapse, sometimes described as a civil war.

An independent, but deeply unstable Albanian state had been established in the aftermath of the Balkan Wars and was set to transition into a monarchy as a result of the arrangements of the European Great Powers. Immediately after Albania formally became a monarchy under Prince Wilhelm of Wied in February 1914, debilitating mass conflict erupted in the country. Wilhelm's failure to maintain control led to his departure from Albania that September, resulting in a political vacuum and the end of any remaining central authority.

The collapse, which eventually became intertwined with the Balkans theatre of World War I, involved various factions that asserted control as the country split along religious and ethnic (Note: Namely the ethnically Greek Autonomous Republic of Northern Epirus) lines; multiple countries also intervened and occupied the recognized territory of Albania. The country's fragmented situation would not be resolved until after the end of the war.

== Background ==
=== Albania gains independence ===
The First Balkan War (1912–1913), which pitted the Balkan League (Greece, Bulgaria, Montenegro, and Serbia) against the Ottoman Empire, resulted in the defeat of the latter and its withdrawal from most of the Balkans. During this time, Albanian nationalists, who sought to form an independent Albania and resist any partition at the hands of the Balkan League, convened the All-Albanian Congress in Vlorë on 28 November 1912. The result was the declaration of an independent provisional Albanian state (Independent Albania) that same day under the leadership of Ismail Qemali, which only controlled a small region that included Vlorë (designated as the capital), Berat, and Lushnjë. The rest of the territory within the modern Albanian borders was occupied by Greek, Serbian, and Montenegrin forces.

The Treaty of London (1913), enforced by the Great Powers, delineated the present borders of Albania, resulting in a much more reduced territory compared to that which had been claimed by Qemali's government. The treaty also established the International Control Commission (ICC) to supervise Albania and provide security. Finally, the Great Powers decided that Albania would become a monarchy, and began looking for a prince.

=== Descent into instability and establishment of monarchy ===
A power struggle began in October 1913 when Essad Pasha Toptani, an ambitious local commander and politician, established a rival administration (the Republic of Central Albania) in central Albania, a largely Muslim region. Toptani sought to challenge Qemali's government and characterized it as the undemocratic "personal creation of a number of men". The Republic of Central Albania was supported by the local Muslim nobles as well as by Serbia. Toptani's seizure of central Albania also resulted in the Catholic population of northern Albania being cut off from Qemali's administration; however, the Catholics had never been eager to submit to any central Albanian government anyways. Meanwhile, Serbian and Montenegrin troops finalized their withdrawal from Albania's recognized territory in November 1913.

This unfavorable situation was further compounded by a plot, spearheaded by Bekir Fikri, to establish an Albanian-Ottoman alliance and install a Turkish ruler (Ahmet Izzit Pasha) in Albania. The ICC uncovered the plot in January 1914 and raided Vlorë, discovering more than 200 Ottoman soldiers which had infiltrated the country. Qemali, who had supported the plot, was forced to resign. Toptani was subsequently also made to disband his administration and step aside in February 1914, as by that time Prince Wilhelm of Wied, a German, had agreed to become the monarch of Albania. The new Principality of Albania, with Wilhelm as prince, was then proclaimed on 21 February 1914.

== Course of events ==
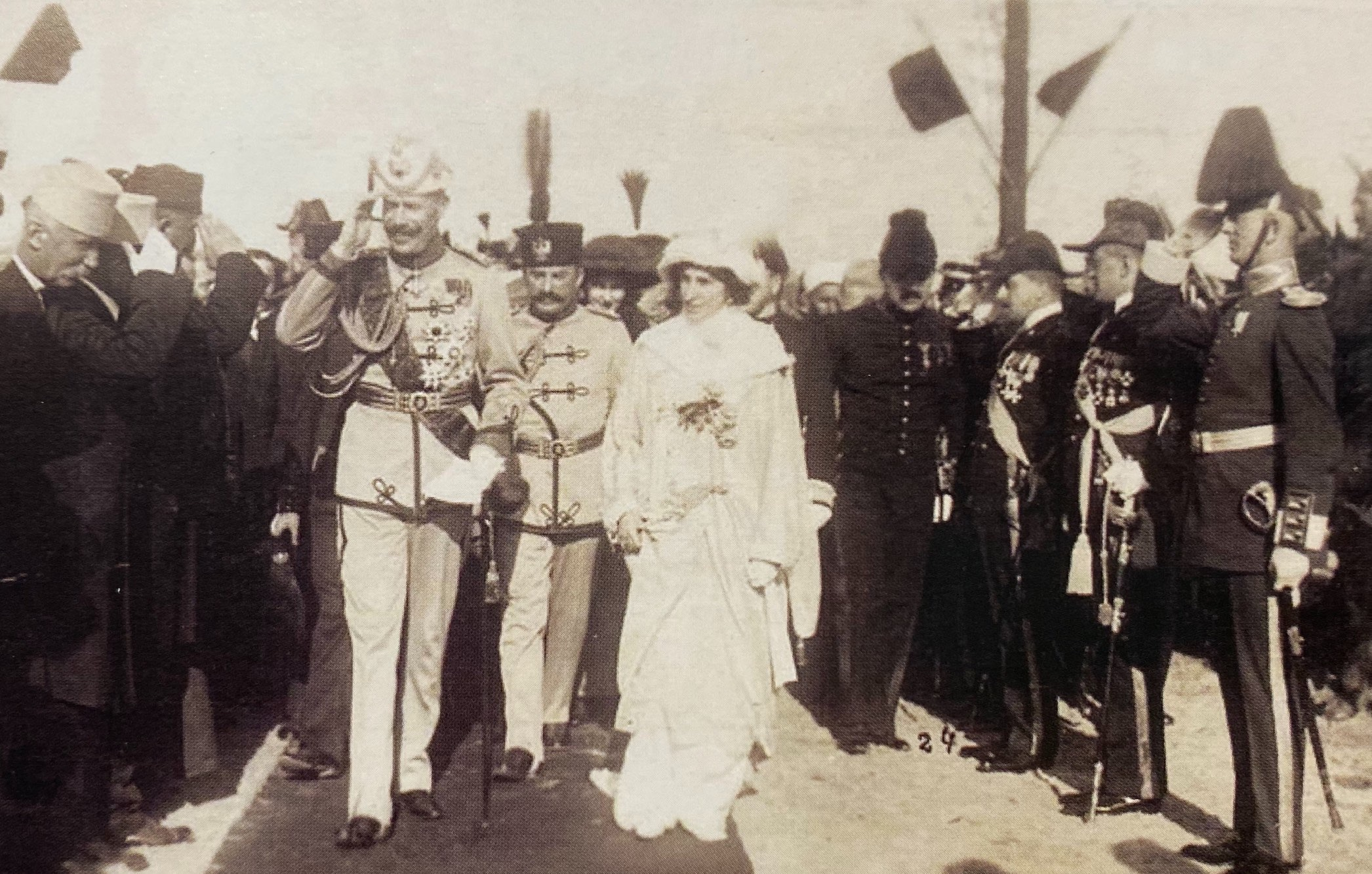
Prince Wilhelm of Wied and his wife, Princess Sophie of Schönburg-Waldenburg, arriving in Albania in March 1914

=== Wilhelm's assumption of power and Northern Epirote revolt ===
On 21 February 1914, the Principality of Albania was formally established as an Albanian delegation arrived in Neuwied, Germany to ceremonially transfer the power to Wilhelm. The Great Powers allowed Toptani to lead this delegation as compensation for his displacement from power. The Catholic tribes decided to support Wilhelm and swore loyalty to him.

That same day, the Great Powers asked for the withdrawal of the Greek army, which was still occupying territory in southern Albania (Northern Epirus) assigned to be within Albanian borders. The ethnic Greek majority of Northern Epirus, unwilling to come under Albanian administration, revolted and established the Autonomous Republic of Northern Epirus on 28 February as the Greek army withdrew south. This state was led by Georgios Christakis-Zografos. Fighting erupted between the Northern Epirotes and Albanian forces, and lasted throughout the spring.

Wilhelm finally arrived in Albania's new capital of Durrës a month later on 7 March 1914, with his wife and a small royal household. His six-month reign would be characterized as largely incompetent, with the Great Powers continuously intervening in his affairs via their representatives in the ICC. A new government was formed, led by Turhan Përmeti serving as prime minister. The power-hungry Toptani gained an influential position as the new minister of war and minister of the interior, from which he constantly undermined the government. From an organizational point of view, aside from the Ministry of Internal Affairs, the rest of the cabinet was dysfunctional.

Albanian forces and Northern Epirote separatists continued fighting until May, when the Albanian government decide to negotiate with Northern Epirus as they were unable to suppress the revolt. Toptani discreetly aided the Northern Epirotes by preventing 20,000 Albanian reinforcements from being deployed to fight them. The result of the negotiations was the Protocol of Corfu, signed on 17 May 1914, in which it was agreed to that the Autonomous Republic of Northern Epirus would continue to exist as a self-governing entity within Albania.

=== Outbreak of Muslim revolt and exile of Toptani ===
Meanwhile, Prince Wilhelm's arrival in Albania had caused immediate anger and unrest among the Muslims of central Albania, who were influenced by Ottoman propaganda which portrayed the new regime as a tool of the Christian powers and the large landowners. By early May 1914, the discontent had evolved into a general revolt led by Haxhi Qamili and other Muslim clerics. The aim of the rebels was to restore Ottoman rule over Albania, and they violently rejected Albanian nationalism and secularism. The preferred method of organization of the rebels was the formation of local councils for directing and expanding the rebellion.

There are differing accounts as to the exact nature of Toptani's involvement in the uprising. Some sources indicate that he had a leading role in the uprising from the beginning, yet others describe the rebels as explicitly anti-Toptani. In any case, and regardless of whether he actually enjoyed widespread support among the rebels, Toptani wanted to take advantage of the chaos to oust Prince Wilhelm and seize power for himself, and was backed by Italy, which viewed Wilhelm as too pro-Austrian. Dutch officers led by Lodewijk Thomson who were stationed in Albania as part of the ICC ultimately decided to have Toptani arrested, despite Wilhelm remaining indecisive on the matter. On 19 May, Toptani's house was raided by government forces and he surrendered; the following day he was exiled to Italy.

=== Expanding conflict and first siege of Durrës ===
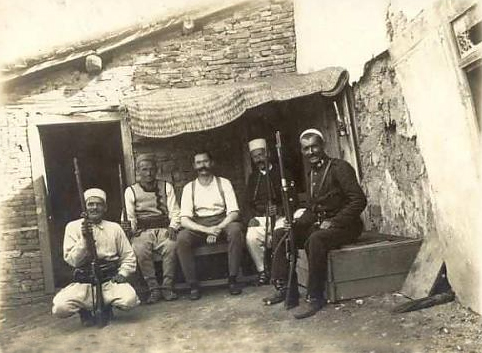
Muslim peasant rebels with a captured Dutch officer, Hendrik Reimers, in June 1914

Toptani's departure had little effect on the expanding insurgency in central Albania, which continued throughout the summer of 1914. The Catholic Albanian tribes, once more cut off from the rest of the country, remained loyal to Wilhelm and did not support the Muslim revolt. They sent troops under the command of Prenk Bib Doda and Isa Boletini to participate in a joint operation with Dutch forces to defeat the Muslim rebels. They engaged the rebels at Shijak near Durrës on 23 May, but this attack failed. In the aftermath of the battle, fearing that the triumphant rebels were about to enter Durrës, Prince Wilhelm and his family briefly fled and took refuge on an Italian ship off the coast. They later returned that evening as the rebels had maintained their positions. That same day, the rebels captured Tirana.

On 3 June, the first central political body of the Muslim insurgency, the "General Council", was elected following an assembly of councils at Shijak. By now, while there appeared to be factions who were in favor of Toptani and factions who were opposed to him, they had all firmly united in order to reach their common goal of ousting Prince Wilhelm.

The Principality of Albania now only de facto controlled Durrës and its outskirts, with Thomson leading the defense of the city. The Muslim insurgents continued to siege the city, and Thomson was killed on 15 June during a rebel attack.

Northern Epirus also took advantage of the situation to finish consolidating its territory, seizing Korçë on 8 July and Tepelenë later that month.

More ICC reinforcements from Germany, Austria-Hungary, and Romania arrived in Durrës in early July, but failed to prevent successive victories of the Muslim rebels, most notably the capture of Berat and Vlorë from the ICC on 12 July and 21 August, respectively. Owing to negative public opinion in the Netherlands, the Dutch military mission in Albania was formally terminated on 27 July. One day later (28 July), World War I broke out.

=== Departure of Prince Wilhelm ===
The attention of the Great Powers quickly turned towards the new European war and away from the chaos in Albania. The Austro-Hungarians and Germans began leaving the besieged Durrës on 2 August 1914. This was followed by the departure of the Dutch two days later. The ICC's multinational force left the country on 23 August. Nonetheless, Austria-Hungary demanded that Prince Wilhelm send Albanian troops to fight with the Central Powers. When Wilhelm refused, stating that the Treaty of London had required Albania to remain neutral, his remuneration was cut off.

On 1 September 1914, the Muslim insurgents notified the ICC that they demanded that Wilhelm leave Albania or they would begin a renewed bombardment of Durrës until it surrendered. Under overwhelming pressure, Wilhelm finally decided it would indeed be best to leave the country, departing on 3 September 1914 on the same Italian yacht that he had briefly fled to earlier in May after the battle at Shijak. He issued a proclamation to the Albanian people that "he deemed it necessary to absent himself temporarily", and went on to join the Imperial German Army on the eastern front. The ICC briefly assumed full control of the Albanian government before disbanding itself on 6 September. The next day, Durrës finally fell to the Muslim rebels.

With these events, remaining central authority crumbled and any sense of national unity in Albania evaporated.

=== Emergence of the Senate of Central Albania and return of Toptani ===
The "Senate of Central Albania" was the polity that was formed by the Muslim insurgents after their capture of Durrës on 7 September 1914. Inside the city, the victorious rebels hoisted the Ottoman flag, began imprisoning supporters of Wilhelm, and declared that they would seek to install a Muslim prince. Prince Şehzade Mehmed Burhaneddin, a son of the former Ottoman sultan Abdul Hamid II, was invited to take up this position, but this proposal never materialized. Conflict broke out between the Senate of Central Albania and Northern Epirus after the latter attacked Berat.

The Senate apparently dropped its plans for a "Muslim prince" and invited Toptani to return to Albania and take over as leader. Toptani had been in France when World War I broke out and immediately left for Albania, seeking to take power and align Albania with the Entente Powers. Along the way, he stopped at Serbia and signed the Treaty of Niš with the Serbian prime minister Nikola Pašić on 17 September. The treaty envisioned a Serb-Albanian alliance that would be implemented with Toptani returning to Albania and being elected as leader. On 19 September, with full Serbian support, Toptani returned to Albania. He went to the Dibër region, where he gathered a force of 4,000 volunteers, and peacefully entered Durrës at the beginning of October 1914. On 5 October, with the backing of the Senate, Toptani proclaimed himself as prime minister and president, setting up the Toptani Government, considered the 3rd ruling government of Albania. Immediately afterwards, he declared war on Austria-Hungary to show he was on the side of the Entente.

Toptani was aware that the vast majority of the population governed by the Senate of Central Albania remained pro-Ottoman (the Ottoman Empire was neutral at this point in the war). Therefore, he did not question the Senate's pro-Ottoman policy nor its nominal declaration that the Ottoman sultan (Mehmed V) had suzerainty over Albania.

=== Northern Albania rejects Toptani ===
In the meantime, the Catholic tribes of northern Albania, which had been loyal to Prince Wilhelm, reverted to autonomous self-rule and rejected the authority of the Senate of Central Albania. Shortly after Prince Wilhelm's departure, Shkodër, the main city of the region, formed a local administration in the form of a council, under the supervision of the Entente.

In October 1914, Toptani informed the Serbian government of his intention to launch an operation against the Catholic tribes in order to gain control of northern Albania; this never came to fruition.

=== Montenegrin, Greek, and Italian interventions of late 1914 ===
During the latter part of 1914, Montenegro, Greece, and Italy initiated the first foreign military interventions in Albania since the start of World War I. Because the Great Powers were already preoccupied with the war, they were in much less of a state to actively guarantee any protection of Albanian territory.

In mid-September 1914 troops from Montenegro began limited incursions into the Kelmendi region in northwestern Albania, seizing control of a few villages.

Greek prime minister Eleftherios Venizelos, concerned about the fighting between Northern Epirus and Central Albania, decided to launch a military intervention in late October 1914 after receiving approval from the Great Powers. The Greek army entered southern Albania and reoccupied all of it except Vlorë by 27 October. The government of Northern Epirus then proceeded to dissolve itself, with the objective of incorporation into Greece achieved.

On 31 October, Italy occupied the island of Sazan off the coast of Vlorë, which had been recognized as part of Albania but was claimed by Italy. Later the Italians began an occupation of Vlorë itself, which is variously described as having begun in November or December 1914, on account of its strategic importance in the Adriatic Sea.

=== Krujë revolt against Toptani and second siege of Durrës ===
The Ottoman Empire declared war against the Entente on 31 October 1914. This shattered Toptani's balance between his pro-Entente administration and his overtures to the pro-Ottoman majority of Central Albania. Emboldened especially by the Ottoman declaration of jihad against the Entente (14 November), a Muslim revolt occurred once more, this time starting from the Krujë area.

These rebels were extremely anti-Serbian and influenced by Ottoman propaganda which branded Toptani as a traitor to Islam and called for the reconquest of Kosovo from Serbia. On 20 December, an assembly of rebel delegates formed a body called the "Union of Krujë" to direct the uprising. Haxhi Qamili returned to become one of the commanders of this new revolt.

The Union of Krujë significantly jeopardized Toptani's position. Many of his followers, swayed by the rebels' rhetoric, defected over to their side. The Central Powers actively supported them, with Ottoman officers arriving in the region to command rebel forces, and Austria-Hungary regularly supplying the rebels with money, weapons, and ammunition. The Krujë rebels also began conducting cross-border raids into Serbia alongside Bulgarian irregulars.

The Krujë rebels continued to expand their territorial gains at the expense of the Senate of Central Albania. Under significant pressure, Toptani requested multiple times for both Serbia and Greece to come to his aid. Seeking to placate Greece, he recognized Greek control of Northern Epirus in a secret agreement. Serbia finally ordered preparations for an intervention in support of the Senate to be made in December 1914, but this was delayed significantly by the concerns of fellow Entente member Russia that operations in Albania might distract from the Austro-Hungarian front and appear to challenge the Italian interests in the country. By then, the Senate- just like Prince Wilhelm's administration before it- had been stripped of all territorial control outside of Durrës, which was under constant siege by the Krujë rebels. Only the Italian navy, present in the adjacent bay, was helping defend Durrës from the rebels.

In May 1915, Qamili was elected as leader of the rebels, marking his second time leading a pro-Ottoman revolt in Albania.

=== Serbian defeat of Krujë rebels ===
After months of delay, the Serbian intervention finally got underway at the beginning of June 1915. The Serbs organized a massive three-pronged offensive into Albania. Qamili led a defense against the Serbian forces at Qukës but was defeated and taken prisoner. The Serbs successfully crushed the insurgency, relieving the besieged Toptani, and Qamili and other detained rebel leaders were sent to Durrës where they were hanged. A special "Albanian Detachment" was set up by the Serbs to completely pacify Albania and consolidate Toptani's authority. However, the Mirdita region in northern Albania remained outside of the control of Serbian forces.

The Montenegrin army, capitalizing on the situation, moved in from the north to capture Shkodër. While there were some failed attempts to repel them on the part of the locals, the Entente-supervised administration of the city did not itself resist the Montenegrins.

The Serbian intervention was strongly opposed by Italy and other Entente members, but Serbia stated that these were temporary actions and that its troops would withdraw from Albania as soon as Toptani's rule over the country was consolidated.

On 28 June 1915, Toptani and the Serbian interior minister signed a treaty aiming to set up a Serbian-Albanian union with an envisioned joint army, customs administration, national bank, and foreign missions, with Toptani being recognized as prince over Albania, and with Serbian forces remaining in Albania for the foreseeable future in order to support Toptani and eliminate common enemies.

=== Great Retreat and multiple occupations ===
In October 1915, the Central Powers launched a coordinated attack against Serbia, entering Belgrade and sweeping through the entire country, pushing the Serbian forces into what is called the Great Retreat. Serbian troops first retreated to the Kosovo region (at that time controlled by Serbia) and then began to retreat through Montenegro and Albania in late November, aiming to reach the Adriatic coast and reorganize.

The Toptani government provided support to the retreating Serbian army when it could, but in some cases the Serbians came under by attack by irregular forces in Catholic areas seeking revenge for previous invasions. Toptani's forces engaged in skirmishes with these irregulars.

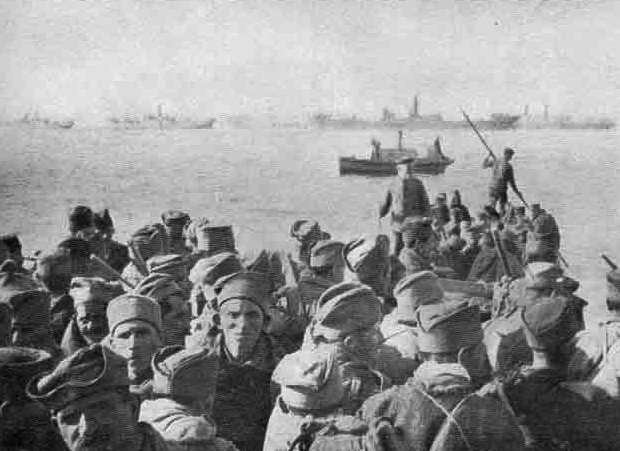
Serbian troops on the Albanian coast waiting to be evacuated to Corfu, 1916

Central Powers forces pursued the Serbs into Albania, and large swathes of Albania came under Central Powers occupation. Austria-Hungary occupied the largest part of Albania, from Vlorë to Lake Ohrid; the occupation governed out of Shkodër and local administration remained in the hands of the Albanians. Bulgaria also occupied the eastern portions of Albania.

With Austro-Hungarian forces on the verge of taking Durrës, Toptani and several hundred of his personnel evacuated out of the country in February 1916; prior to his departure he declared war on the Central Powers (in October 1914 he had declared war only on Austria-Hungary). With the support of Serbia, Greece, and France, Toptani's government was recognized as a legitimate government-in-exile. Ultimately however, Toptani was effectively marginalized as Albania became a battleground between the Entente and the Central Powers.

Northern Epirus was wrestled out of the hands of a divided Greece, plagued by the National Schism. First, the Bulgarian army expelled Greek forces from Korçë in August 1916 and occupied the area. Then, in September, Italy seized the rest of Northern Epirus and also expelled Greek forces there– which were royalist troops that were in favor of Greek neutrality in the war unlike their rivals the Venizelists. Finally, France seized the Korçë area from Bulgaria in October, and in December the French proclaimed the establishment of the Autonomous Province of Korçë. In June 1917, Italy established the Albanian Republic in the territory it held in southern Albania, de facto operating as an Italian protectorate. As Central Powers forces were pushed out of Albania, the protectorate grew in size and came to control nearly all of the country by the end of the war in November 1918. Toptani bitterly opposed the French and Italian actions and protested to Serbia without success.

=== Postwar reemergence of Albania ===
Albanian nationalists still sought the unity of Albanian territory, even if it meant maintaining Italian suzerainty. The Congress of Durrës, which opened on 25 December 1918, gathered together delegates from across Italian-occupied Albania and formed a pro-Italian government, the Government of Durrës. The Congress also sent delegates to the Paris Peace Conference to represent the Albanians.

On 20 August 1919, the Government of Durrës signed an unpopular agreement with Italy, in which the latter recognized the authority of the Government in all parts of Italian-occupied Albania with the exception of Sazan Island and Vlorë. The agreement also provided for an Italian High Commissioner to oversee the Government of Durrës. On 14 January 1920, an agreement was reached at the Paris Peace Conference– without the knowledge or consent of the Albanians– to partition Albania among Greece, Montenegro, and Serbia.

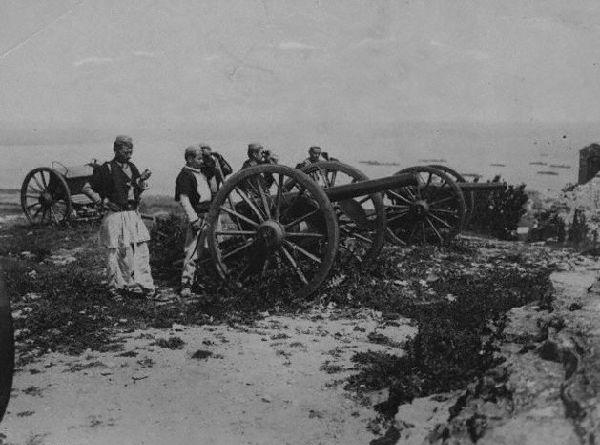
Albanian soldiers with captured Italian cannons during the Vlora War, 1920

As a result of these developments, a nationalist, anti-Italian movement surged across the whole of Albania. Albanian nationalists organized the Congress of Lushnjë in late January 1920, deciding to resist the partition plan and the Italian occupation, and deciding to establish Tirana as the new Albanian capital. The Congress established a four-man regency and the Delvina Government, which successfully replaced the now discredited Government of Durrës and fired its remaining officials. Despite the presence of Italian forces, the Delvina government managed to extend its jurisdiction in most of the Italian-occupied territory. Also in March 1920, United States president Woodrow Wilson intervened to block the implementation of the partition plan, demonstrating American support for Albanian independence. In April, the Delvina Government successfully quashed a coup attempt orchestrated by Toptani.

Relations between the new Albanian government and the Italians were poor; throughout the spring of 1920 nationalist committees were formed across Albania and clashes between Italian and Albanian forces were reported. Nonetheless, on the initiative of Francesco Nitti, prime minister of Italy at that time, the military presence in Albania was reduced except in the Vlorë region. In the meantime, the French left Korçe and handed it over to the Albanian government in May or June 1920. Italian refusals to hand over the Vlorë region culminated in the Vlora War in the summer of 1920. The conflict ended with Italy withdrawing from all of Albania except Sazan Island. Albania had successfully regained its independence.

In December 1920, Albania, with the aid of Britain, gained admission into the League of Nations, winning international recognition as a sovereign state.

== Aftermath ==
The new Albanian unity was briefly interrupted by the 1921 rebellion of Catholic tribes in Mirdita led by Marka Gjoni. This separatist Republic of Mirdita was backed by Yugoslavia, which then used the revolt as a pretext to invade Albania. Following a brief war, Yugoslav forces withdrew and Albanian troops led by Ahmet Zogu overran the Mirdita rebels.

Albania continued to formally exist as a principality, though one under the regency council established by the Congress of Lushnjë, while successive Albanian interwar governments rapidly appeared and disappeared. Zogu became leader of the government in early 1922 and managed to repel an uprising in Tirana by forces opposed to his administration. He soon became the "unchallenged political force in Albania" with the exception of a brief period in 1924 when his rival Fan Noli took power following the June Revolution. After Zogu returned, supported by Yugoslavia, he converted Albania into a republic in 1925. However, it was a republic in name only, as Zogu assumed dictatorial powers and Albania became an authoritarian state.

== War crimes against Albanians ==
=== By foreign forces ===
During the Albanian collapse, multiple war crimes targeting the Albanian population took place, perpetrated by Serbian, Greek, and Montenegrin occupying forces.

==== In general ====
According to an article in the Boston Daily Globe, published on 8 November 1915, Serbian and Montenegrin troops shot or bayonetted 20,000 Albanian women and children, and destroyed 300 villages and 35,000 houses, leaving 330,000 people without asylum.

==== Northern Epirus ====
At least 145 Albanian villages in southern Albania were looted and destroyed by Greek forces in Northern Epirus. Accompanying this was the destruction of 48 Bektashi teqes, or shrines, at the hands of the Greek forces. In total, 80% of the teqes in Albania were either extremely damaged or destroyed entirely from 1914 to 1915.

Greek forces conducted arson attacks and looting, and towns like Tepelenë, Leskovik and Frashër, among others, were burnt down completely. This devastation was accompanied by the massacre of a large part of the population, especially the Muslim part.

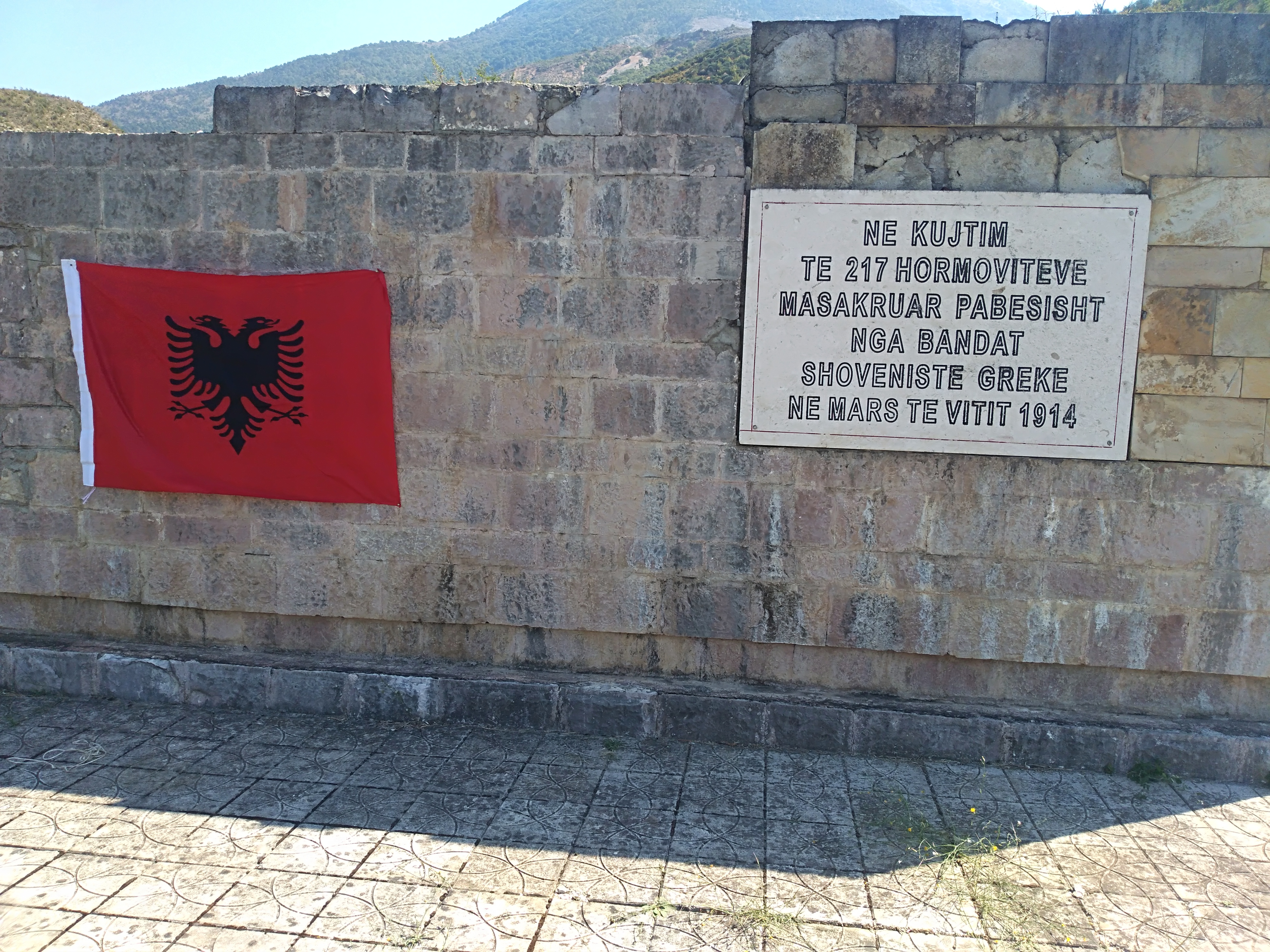
The memorial for the men massacred in Hormova by Greek forces in 1914

On 29 April 1914, Greek troops massacred 217 men and boys from Hormovë inside the premises of the monastery of Saint Mary in the neighboring village of Kodra.

Journalist and Albanian nationalist activist Kristo Dako reported that in May 1914 Greek forces committed atrocities in the district of Korçë. According to him hundreds of Muslim homes were destroyed and the Albanian Christian population was expelled from multiple villages. In the process, many civilians were massacred, including Christians. Roughly 20,000 refugees were created in and around Korçë. After Greek forces seized Korçe, they began to loot the shops and homes of Muslim Albanians, as well as committing murders and rapes.

==== Northern Albania ====
In November 1915, Montenegrin troops murdered Albanian intellectuals and patriots. Others were captured and sent to Cetinje and executed. Among the killed was publicist Moustafa Hilmi Leskoviki, head of the Albanian paper "Kombi".

=== By Albanians ===
During the first pro-Ottoman revolt from May to September 1914, the Sunni Muslim rebel forces massacred Bektashis and burned down many Bektashi teqes, due to the strong links between Bektashism and Albanian nationalism. The rebels also targeted Christians, Albanian nationalist teachers who had been teaching using the Latin alphabet, (Note: Since the Ottoman Empire used the Arabic alphabet, Haxhi Qamili viewed teachers of the Albanian language, which uses the Latin script, as enemies of the Ottomans.) and even Sunni clerics who were supporters of Albanian nationhood.

== Historiography and analysis ==
James Tallon argues that the events in Albania from 1912 to 1925 make up a "long war" for the country and merit categorization as one sustained period of conflict.

Isa Blumi, writing for the International Encyclopedia of the First World War, says that both geography and the strategic concerns of foreign powers paradoxically assured both Albanian instability and Albanian existence as a distinctive entity, noting that Albanian territorial integrity was only preserved because of Italy's need for protection of its interests against Slavic or Greek hegemony.

== See also ==
- World War I in Albania
- 1997 Albanian civil unrest
- Failed state
