= Albanian Civil War =

Albanian Civil War may refer to:

- Albanian Civil War (1943–1944)
- 1997 Albanian civil unrest
- Collapse of the Principality of Albania
