= Treaty of Niš =

The Treaty of Niš may refer to:

- The Treaty of Niš (1739), a peace treaty signed on 29 September 1739 in Niš (East Serbia), by the Ottoman Empire on one side and Russian Empire on the other
- The Treaty of Niš (1914), a secret treaty signed in Niš (Kingdom of Serbia) between Essad Pasha Toptani and prime minister Nikola Pašić of Kingdom of Serbia on 17 September 1914.
- The Treaty of Niš (1923), a treaty signed on 23 March 1923 by the Kingdom of Serbs, Croats and Slovenes and Kingdom of Bulgaria
