= Haxhi Isuf Banka =

Albanian economist and politician

6th Finance Minister of Albania
- In office 27 May 1915 – 27 January 1916
- Prime Minister: Essad Toptani
- Preceded by: Nexhati Libohova
- Succeeded by: Ndoc Çoba

Personal details
- Born: 1864 Tirana, Ottoman Empire
- Died: 1 September 1944 (aged 79–80) Tirana, Albania
- Education: Istanbul University

Haxhi Isuf Banka (Zhelegu) (1864 – September 1, 1944) was an Albanian economist and politician who served as Minister of Finances in the Toptani Government.

== Biography ==
Haxhi Isuf Zhelegu was born on 1864 in Tirana, then Ottoman Empire. After finishing elementary schooling in his hometown, he moved to further his studies in Turkey and in 1887, graduated with a degree in Finance from Istanbul University. Later, he returned to Tirana with his family and began to work in the banking sector where eventually he would be known with the moniker surname "Banka" (Albanian: Bank). On November 26, 1912, he took part in raising the flag of independence in Tirana. Two years later, he was arrested and imprisoned by Haxhi Qamili's rebels. From 1915–1916 he served as Minister of Finances in the Toptani Government, replacing Nexhati Libohova who had been assassinated. After the fall of the government in January 1916, he fled with Essad Toptani to Thessaloniki.

Banka returned to Albania in 1918 and on December 29 of that year, was appointed deputy prefect of Kavajë, a post which he held until February 1920. Between 1920 and 1921 he served as deputy prefect of Tirana. At the end of his term, in 1921 he was elected member of the National Council and served until 1923, representing the Progressive Party. During this time, he shared the role of the guardian of the presidency of the National Council. Later, he was named plenipotentiary representative of the government for the suppression of the Mirdita Uprising. After the June Revolution of 1924, he became one of the leaders of the National Democratic Party. He died on September 1, 1944, in Tirana.
