= Ludwig Können-Horák =

Austro-Hungarian general (1861–1938)

Geheimrat Ludwig Können-Horák
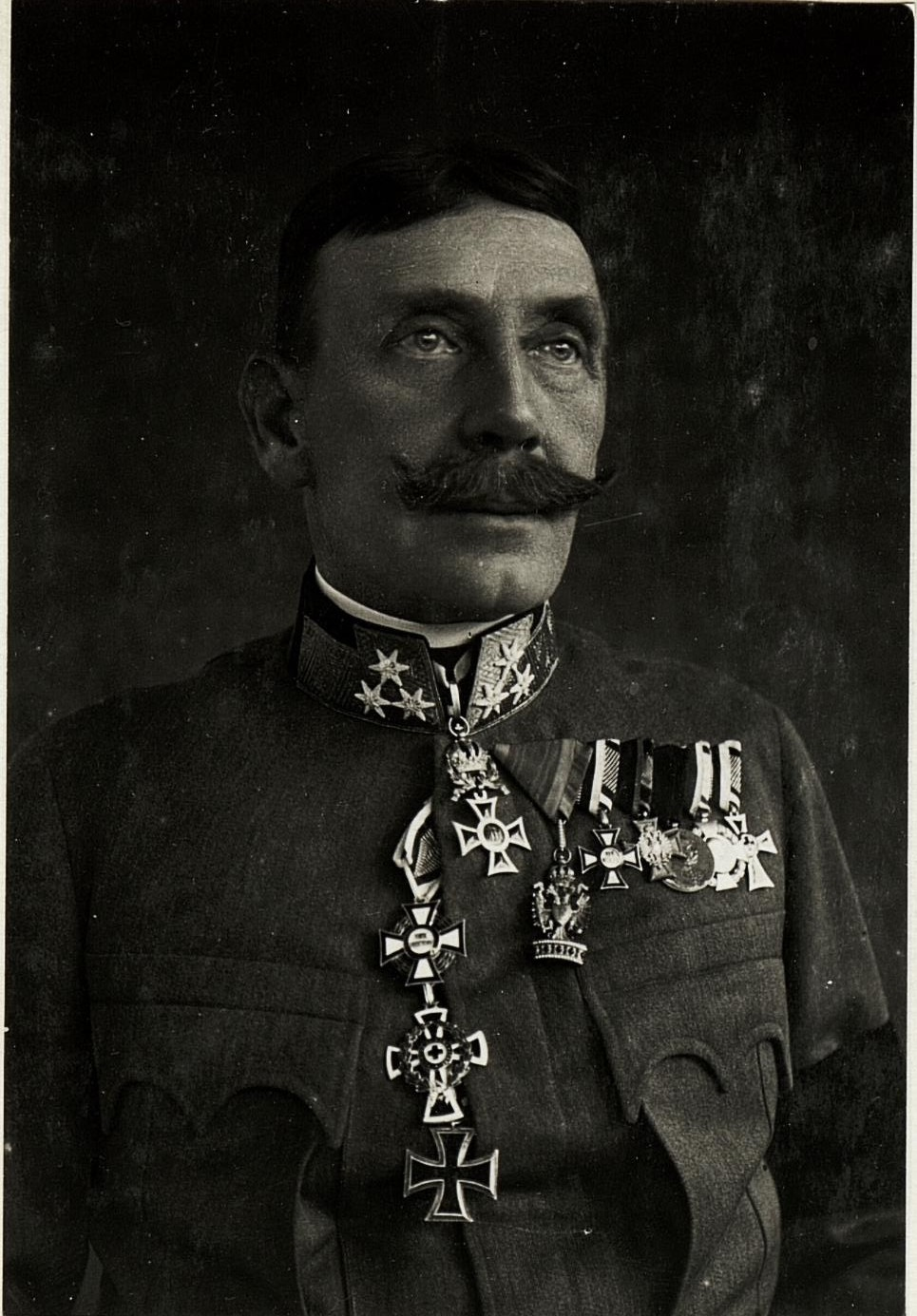
- Born: 15 February 1861; Vienna, Austria
- Died: 14 October 1938 (aged 77); Vienna, Austria
- Alma mater: Theresian Military Academy
- Military career
- Allegiance: Austria-Hungary
- Branch: Austro-Hungarian Army
- Service years: 1879–1918
- Rank: General of the Infantry
- Conflicts: World War I: Italian front; White War; Eastern front; Albanian campaign

Ludwig Können-Horák von Höhenkampf was an Austrian General of the Infantry who participated in World War I. He was the main Austro-Hungarian commander of the White War as he assumed command over 30 battalions of the war.

== Early military career ==
Können-Horák was born in Vienna in 1861 and he attended the Theresian Military Academy in Wiener Neustadt. In 1882, he was assigned as a second lieutenant to the 18th Infantry Regiment. From 1885 to 1887, he attended courses to become a member of the Austro-Hungarian General Staff. In the following year, he was promoted to lieutenant of staff. Können-Horák was then promoted to captain in 1890, remaining in the General Staff until 1895 where he dealt with mapping in Transylvania with the XIV Army Corps. In 1895 he began a year of active service with the 2nd Tiroler Kaiserjäger Regiment. From 1896 to 1900, when he was promoted to lieutenant colonel, he worked in the military geographic office before returning in 1901 to service with the troop in the 2nd Landesschützen Regiment.

In 1903, he was promoted to colonel and in 1904, he was transferred from the Joint Common Army to the Imperial-Royal Landwehr. In the same year he was placed in charge of the 30th Landwehr Regiment. Five years later, he assumed command of the 44th Landwehr Infantry Division and in 1910, he was promoted to major general. In 1911, he was assigned to the command of the 14th Army Corps and in 1913, he was promoted to Feldmarschalleutnant.

== World War I ==
At the outbreak of World War I, he was appointed military commander of Innsbruck and Tyrol. In this office, was the leader of the defense troops of the Tyrol organized and grouped by General Rohr as early as August 1914 in the Tyrolean resistance line. With the Italian entry into World War I in May 1915, the territorial command of Tyrol passed to General Viktor Dankl von Krasnikand and Können-Horák was placed at the head of the 91st Infantry Division deployed in the III sector of Rayon Tyrol, later renamed Rayon "South Tyrol" which extended from the Presanella and Adamello Group through the Giudicarie and the northern part of Lake Garda until beyond the Valsugana in Trentino. In November 1915, the 91st Division was dissolved and Können-Horak directly assumed command of the III sector.

In the spring of 1916, he organized the defense of the Austro-Hungarian forces when the Royal Italian Army in April attacked the during the Battle of Riva and then between late April and early May when the forces of Alberto Cavaciocchi attacked in the Adamello area. In November 1916, Können-Horák was promoted to General of the Infantry.

He remained in command of Southern Tyrol Rayon until the second half of 1917 and didn't spare to strongly criticize his subordinates when they delayed their orders due to the difficult terrain at the execution of his orders at the top of Corno di Cavento.

In August 1917, Können-Horák became head of the IX Army Corps deployed on the eastern front which he led for only a few months until its dissolution in October 1917. In the same year, he also received the title of Geheimrat. In November 1917, he was assigned to head the XIX Army Corps deployed in the Albanian campaign. In July 1918, he fell seriously ill and had to leave command of the XIX Army Corps.

== Post-war life ==
He was discharged from service on 1 January 1919. After the war. he was president of the Tyrolean section of the Austrian National Association of Combatants and Veterans (Tiroler Landes-Kameradschafts- und Kriegerbund). He died in 1938 in Vienna.

== Awards ==
- Order of the Iron Crown
  - 1st Class with war decorations (Knight)
  - 3rd Class (Knight)
- Order of Leopold, Commander
- Military Merit Cross
  - III Class
  - II Class
- Decoration for Services to the Red Cross
- Medal for the 50th year of reign of Franz Joseph
- 1908 Jubilee Cross
- Marian Cross (Teutonic Order)
