= Nexhati Libohova =

Albanian politician and qadi

5th Finance Minister of Albania
- In office 5 October 1914 – 26 May 1915
- Prime Minister: Essad Toptani
- Preceded by: Filip Noga
- Succeeded by: Haxhi Isuf Banka

Personal details
- Born: 1877 Libohovë, Ottoman Albania
- Died: 26 May 1915 (aged 37–38) Shkallnur, Durrës, Albania
- Education: Istanbul University

Nexhati Libohova (Ismailati) (Libohovë, 1877 – Shkallnur, May 26, 1915) was an Albanian politician, active in the early independence period. A former cadet in the Ottoman Empire, he later joined the government of Essad Pasha Toptani to serve as Minister of Finances. He held the post for less than a year, having been assassinated by Osman Bali over a political dispute with the head of the government, Essad Pasha.

== Biography ==
Nexhati Libohova was born in Libohovë (present day Gjirokastër County) in 1877. He graduated from the Hukúk Faculty of Law in Istanbul in 1904 and subsequently was appointed as a judge in the justice system of the Ottoman Empire from 1904 to 1913.

In 1913, he returned to Albania and began working as personal secretary to prime minister Ismail Qemali in the Provisional Government. The following year, he was named deputy prefect and then prefect of Durrës. During this time, he was approached by the Eldership of Durrës led by Essad Pasha Toptani who persuaded him to switch political allegiances by offering him a high ranking position in the soon to be formed Toptani Cabinet. Libohova began his term as Minister of Finances on October 5, 1914. Due to internal conflicts within the government, his personal frictions with interior minister Shahin Dino and his own pro Austro-Hungarian stance, the prime minister ordered him to be eliminated. He was taken to the village of Shkallnuer, in the outskirts of Durrës, where he was tortured and beaten to death.
