= Sali Toro =

Albanian politician

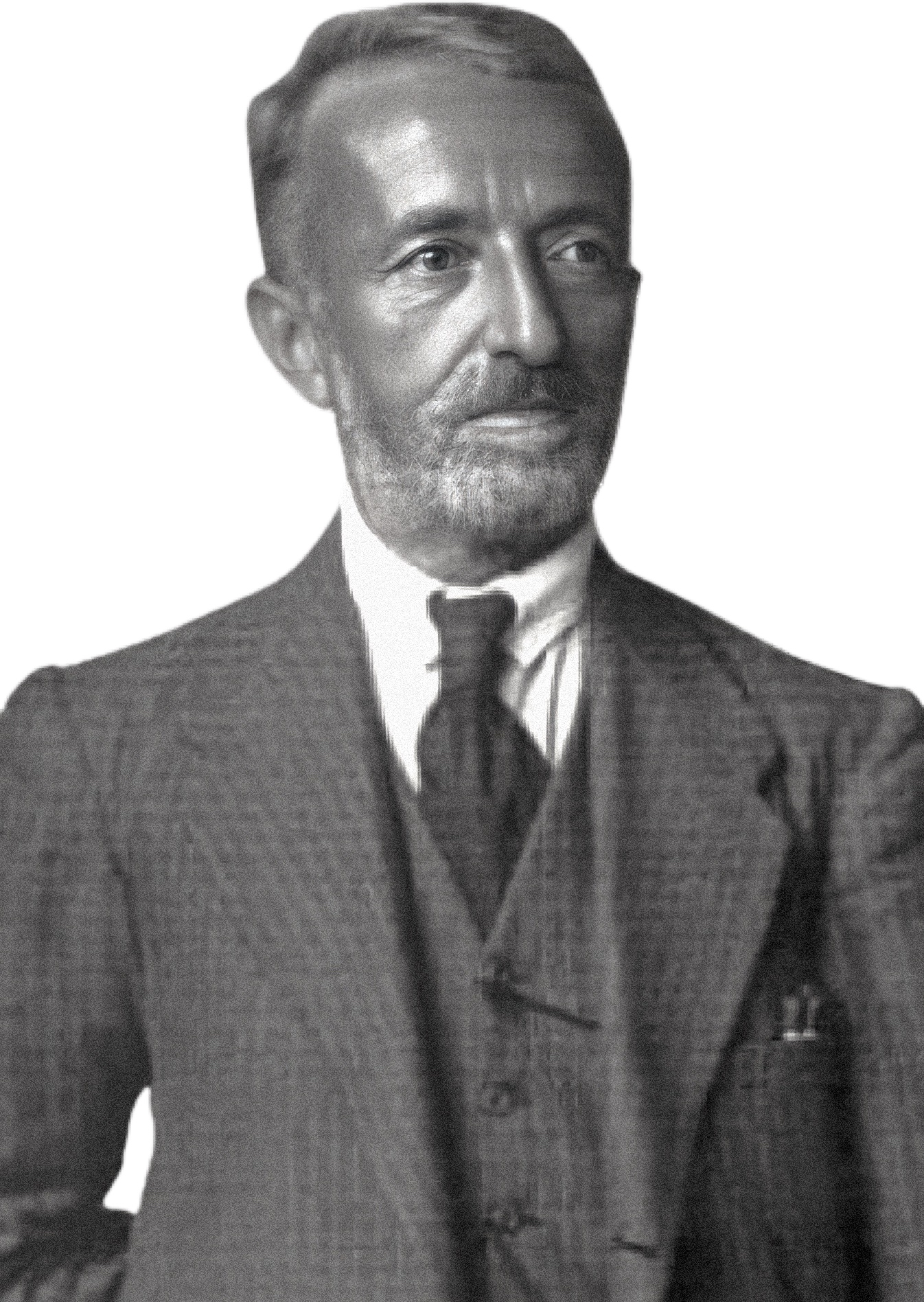

3rd Justice Minister of Albania
- In office 5 October 1914 – 27 January 1916
- Prime Minister: Essad Toptani
- Preceded by: Mufid Libohova
- Succeeded by: Petro Poga

Personal details
- Born: 1870 Gjirokastër, Ottoman Albania
- Died: 15 March 1944 (aged 73–74) Tirana, Albania
- Education: Istanbul University

Sali Toro (1870 – 15 March 1944) was an Albanian lawyer, judge and politician who served as Minister of Justice in the Toptani Government.

== Biography ==
Sali Toro was born in 1870, in the southern city of Gjirokastër, then part of the Ottoman Empire. He graduated from the Faculty of Law at Istanbul University. From 1892 to 1912, he served as prosecutor in Karşehir and then chief justice in Ankara, Pristina, Bursa and Adana. Later he was named President of the Court of Appeal in İzmir and Samsun. Toro returned to Albania in May 1912 and the following year was named chief justice of the Durrës Court. In 1914, he joined the cabinet of Essad Toptani as justice minister, a post he held since 1916. From 1919 to 1920 he served as chief justice in the Court of Berat. In 1920 he was appointed as head of the Dictative Court and served until 1929. On 1 April 1929 he became a member of the State Council. He died in Tirana on 15 March 1944.
