= Senate of Central Albania =

Pro-Ottoman polity in Europe (1914–1916)

Senate of Central Albania Pleqësia e Shqipërisë së Mesme
- 1914–1916
- Ottoman flag (used by the Senate of Central Albania) and flag of the Toptani Government
- Status: De jure under Ottoman suzerainty (self declared) (7 September–November 1914); Formally independent (after November 1914)
- Capital: Durrës
- Religion: Islam
- Government: Islamist provisional government (1914); Personalist dictatorship (1914–1916)
- Head of state
  - 1914: Mustafa Ndroqi
  - 1914–1916: Essad Toptani (as president)
- Prime Minister
  - 1914-1916: Essad Toptani
- Historical era: Collapse of the Principality of Albania; World War I
  - Rebel capture of Durrës: 7 September 1914
  - Formation of the Toptani Government: 5 October 1914
  - Start of pro-Ottoman revolt: November 1914
  - Serbian intervention: June 1915
  - Fall of Durrës: February 1916
Preceded by	Succeeded by
Principality of Albania	Austro-Hungarian occupation of Albania; Bulgarian occupation of Albania
- Today part of: Albania

The Senate of Central Albania was a polity that exercised control over central Albania from 1914 to 1916, during a period where the Principality of Albania had collapsed. It was set up by victorious pro-Ottoman Albanian Muslim insurgents of the 1914 Peasant Revolt after they had forced Wilhelm of Wied, the prince of Albania, to evacuate the country. Essad Toptani led the Senate during most of its two years of existence.

The downfall of the entity began after the entry of the Ottoman Empire into World War I on the side of the Central Powers, which roused the pro-Ottoman elements into a renewed revolt against the pro-Entente Toptani. An intervention by Serbia temporarily relieved Toptani's position, but a Central Powers invasion into Albania and the Serbian Great Retreat brought about his exile in early 1916, leaving Albania to multiple successive foreign occupations.

== Names ==
This entity has been referred to as the Senate of Central Albania, Central Albanian Senate, Government of Central Albania, and Senate for Central Albania.

== Background ==
On 21 February 1914, the Principality of Albania was created, with Wilhelm of Wied agreeing to be the new country's ruler. Wilhelm's arrival in Albania caused immediate anger and unrest among the Muslim majority of central Albania, who were influenced by Ottoman propaganda which portrayed the new regime as a tool of the Christian powers and the large landowners. By early May 1914, the discontent had evolved into a general revolt led by Haxhi Qamili and other Muslim clerics. The aim of the rebels was to restore Ottoman rule over Albania, and they violently rejected Albanian nationalism and secularism.

At first, the revolt was led by various local councils, but later on 3 June 1914, the rebels formed their first central political body, the "General Council", which was elected following an assembly of councils at Shijak. In the General Council, there were factions supportive of Essad Toptani and factions opposed to his influence.

After a long rebel siege of the Albanian capital, Durrës, Prince Wilhelm evacuated the country on 3 September, and the Albanian International Control Commission took over governance until 6 September, when it dissolved itself.

== History ==
=== 1914 ===
On 7 September, the victorious rebels entered Durrës. The rebels declared the establishment of the "Senate of Central Albania". On 11 September, the Senate approved a resolution reinstating the Ottoman sultan, Mehmed V, as the sovereign of Albania; they also adopted the Ottoman flag, and they declared that the Turkish language would once again become the official language of the country. The Senate wanted to install a Muslim prince, and invited Prince Şehzade Mehmed Burhaneddin, a son of the former Ottoman sultan Abdul Hamid II, to take up this position. A delegation was then sent to Constantinople in order to accomplish this objective.

In early October, Essad Toptani, backed by Serbia, arrived in Durrës and became leader. Some sources state the Senate had decided to invite Toptani to rule; others state Toptani seized power through forcible coercion. In any case, he set up the Toptani Government, historiographically considered the 3rd ruling government of Albania, and declared himself president, prime minister, and head of the armed forces. Being pro-Entente, Toptani also immediately declared war on Austria-Hungary. Toptani was determined to maintain good relations with the leaders of the uprising and did not question the proclaimed suzerainty under the Ottomans, who at this stage were still officially neutral in World War I.

The Catholic tribes of northern Albania rejected the Senate's authority and remained outside of its control, reverting to autonomous self-rule. In southern Albania, fighting broke out between the Senate and the separatist Autonomous Republic of Northern Epirus.

On 21 October 1914, Toptani attempted the first agrarian reform in Albania, issuing the order to confiscate the properties of about 50 wealthy landowners and other political opponents, but it never came to fruition.

On 31 October, the Ottoman Empire declared war against the Entente, and issued a declaration of jihad against it on 14 November. All of a sudden, Toptani found the pro-Ottoman majority of central Albania in a deep rupture with his pro-Entente stance. A new Muslim revolt occurred, led by a rebel assembly calling itself the "Union of Krujë", which won over a part of the Toptani supporters, and was backed by the Central Powers. The rebels soon expanded their territorial control and besieged Toptani in Durrës.

Serbia finally ordered preparations for an intervention in support of the Senate to be made in December 1914, but this was delayed significantly by the concerns of fellow Entente member Russia that operations in Albania might distract from the front against Austria-Hungary and appear to challenge the Italian interests in the country.

=== 1915 ===
After months of delay, the Serbian intervention finally got underway at the beginning of June 1915. The Serbs launched a massive offensive into Albania, successfully crushed the insurgency, and set up a special "Albanian Detachment" to completely pacify Albania and consolidate Toptani's authority. These developments were strongly opposed by Italy and other Entente members, but Serbia stated that these were temporary actions and that its troops would withdraw from Albania as soon as Toptani's rule over the country was consolidated.

On 28 June 1915, Toptani and the Serbian interior minister signed a treaty aiming to set up a Serbian-Albanian union with an envisioned joint army, customs administration, national bank, and foreign missions, with Toptani being recognized as prince over Albania, and with Serbian forces remaining in Albania for the foreseeable future in order to support Toptani and eliminate common enemies.

These plans never came to fruition, as the Central Powers launched a coordinated attack against Serbia in October, entering Belgrade and sweeping through the entire country, pushing the Serbian forces into what is called the Great Retreat. Serbian troops first retreated to the Kosovo region (at that time controlled by Serbia) and then began to retreat through Montenegro and Albania in late November, aiming to reach the Adriatic coast and reorganize. The Toptani government provided support to the retreating Serbian army when it could, but in some cases the Serbians came under by attack by irregular forces in Catholic areas seeking revenge for previous invasions. Toptani's forces engaged in skirmishes with these irregulars.

=== 1916 ===
Large swathes of Albania came under Central Powers occupation. With Austro-Hungarian forces on the verge of taking Durrës, Toptani and several hundred of his personnel evacuated out of the country in February 1916; prior to his departure he declared war on the Central Powers (in October 1914 he had declared war only on Austria-Hungary).

Toptani, initially recognized as a legitimate exiled leader, was ultimately marginalized as Albania became a battleground between the rival occupations of the Central Powers and the Entente.

== Later developments ==
In April 1920, Toptani directed a coup attempt to get himself back in power, but this was successfully quashed by the nationalist Delvina Government.
