= Bulgarian occupation of Albania =

WWI military occupation

The Bulgarian occupation of Albania was an occupation of the eastern parts of Albania by the Kingdom of Bulgaria's army during World War I. It lasted from December 10, 1915, when the Bulgarian army after had occupied then Eastern Serbia, crossed the Drin river and entered Albania, until September 9, 1917, when French troops captured Pogradec from the Bulgarian army.

== Background ==
During the First World War the territory of Albania was fragmented by several countries that occupied various parts of Albania. The Kingdom of Bulgaria used its army to occupy the eastern part of Albania, while Austria-Hungary occupied the northern and western parts. After the beginning of the Bulgaria's engagement in First World War on the side of the Central Powers in autumn 1915, many ethnic Albanians joined Bulgaria in their fight against Serbia, and were given arms. Among them were Sali Butka, a south Albanian guerrilla leader, Hysejn Nikolica and Themistokli Gërmenji (until December 1916).

== Events ==
On December 10, 1915, the Bulgarian army crossed the Drin river, entered Albania, and attacked the positions of the retreating Serbian army. On the same day, near Dibra, the Bulgarian army advanced into the valley of river Mat, threatening to capture Shkodra and Lezhë.

A company from the twenty-third infantry regiment of the Bulgarian army under the command of captain Serafimov occupied Elbassan on January 29, 1916.

There was a rivalry between the Kingdom of Bulgaria and Austria-Hungary in establishing their influence in Albania. Attempting to establish its influence in Albania, Bulgaria allowed Ahmed Zogu to establish his administration in Elbasan and supported him in his attempts to revive support for the regime of Wilhelm of Wied.

The double invasion by Austria-Hungary and Kingdom of Bulgaria and a lack of support by the Kingdom of Serbia or Italy, forced Essad Pasha Toptani to leave his proclaimed Senate of Central Albania on February 24, 1916, when he again declared war against Austria-Hungary.

In March 1916 the army of Austria-Hungary took over control of Elbasan from the Bulgarian army which then headed toward Berat. Bulgaria had an idea to persuade Albanian leaders to elect Prince Kiril, second son of Ferdinand I of Bulgaria, for their king (mbret). On August 18, 1916 the Bulgarian army, joining the Austrian forces in Albania in a combined attack against the Italian army, expanded their occupied territory as far as Korçë ejecting the Greek garrison from that territory.

Sali Butka, the south Albanian guerrilla leader who had joined with his lot the invading armies of Austria-Hungary and Bulgaria, burned Moscopole, near Korçë, on October 16, 1916. At that time the Bulgarian army held Pogradec under occupation, together with the army of Austria-Hungary.

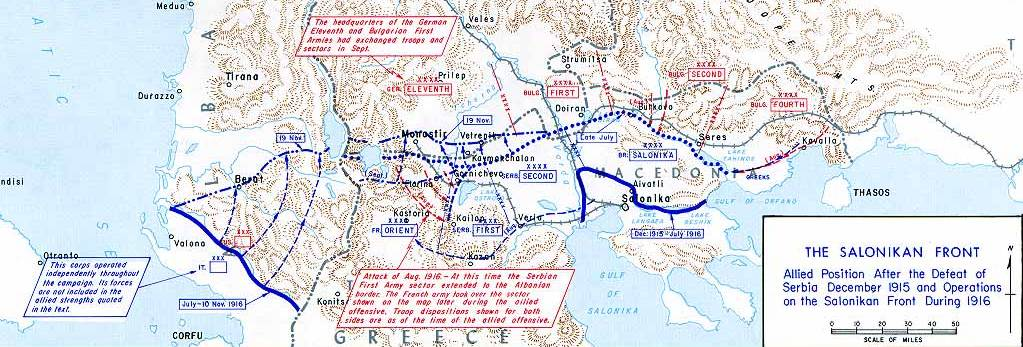
Italian advance in Southern Albania, Autumn 1916

Shortly after, the Italian army advanced, taking over Northern Epirus from the Greeks, and the French army occupied Korçë. On October 25, 1916, it was announced that the Italians were now in touch with the allied left wing in Macedonia.

In September 1917, French General Maurice Sarrail undertook an action against the armies of Austria-Hungary and Bulgaria in Albania. Together with the armies of Bulgaria and Austria-Hungary, there were Albanians, led by Hysejn Nikolica, which fought against the French. But without success: On September 9, 1917 French troops captured Pogradec, ending the Bulgarian occupation of Albania.
