= Toptani Government =

Third ruling government of Albania (1914-16)

- 3rd Government of Albania
- 1914–1916
- Date formed: 5 October 1914
- Date dissolved: 27 January 1916

People and organisations
- Prime Minister: Esad Toptani
- No. of ministers: 6

History
- Predecessor: Përmeti I Government
- Successor: Government of Durrës

The Toptani Government was the 3rd ruling government of Albania, formed on 5 October 1914.

== Overview ==
The lack of governance in Albania created a chance for Essad Toptani, who had fled the country due to his discord with members in the Përmeti I Government, to return one last time and form an alliance with the Entente. Toptani announced the dissolution of the revolutionary bodies and appointed new prefects throughout the country. On October 21, 1914, he undertook the first agrarian reform in Albania, when he issued the order to confiscate the properties of about 50 wealthy landowners and other political opponents, an order which due to the circumstances of that time was never implemented.

Essad also focused his attention to counter the Greek offensive in southern Albania, following the proclamation by the greek authorities on October 27, 1914 of the so called Autonomous Republic of Northern Epirus.

He requested from the presidencies of the councils of Elbasan, Berat and Vlorë to compile lists for the wounded soldiers in the Shkodër War and in the uprising against the monarch Prince Wilhelm.

Giving importance to the establishment of law and order, Toptani ordered work to begin on amassing cadastral records burned by the insurgents. Although impartial during the war, in December 1915, after expelling the diplomatic representatives of Vienna and Sofia from Durrës, Essad declared war on Austria-Hungary. Toptani extended the rule of his government in a larger part of the territory than the previous governments had done but he never quite fully took control of the whole country.

== Cabinet ==
Toptani Government
Essad Toptani – Prime Minister
Sali Toro – Minister of Justice
Shahin Dino – Minister of Internal Affairs
Nexhati Libohova – Minister of Finances (assassinated; replaced by Haxhi Isuf Banka on 27 May 1915)
Aziz Vrioni – Minister of Public Works
Isuf Dibra – Minister of War
Pavli Terka – Foreign Minister

== See also ==
- Politics of Albania
- Esad Toptani
