= Treaty of Niš (1914) =

1914 alliance between Serbia and Albania

Treaty of Serbian–Albanian Alliance
The secret treaty of Serbian-Albanian alliance
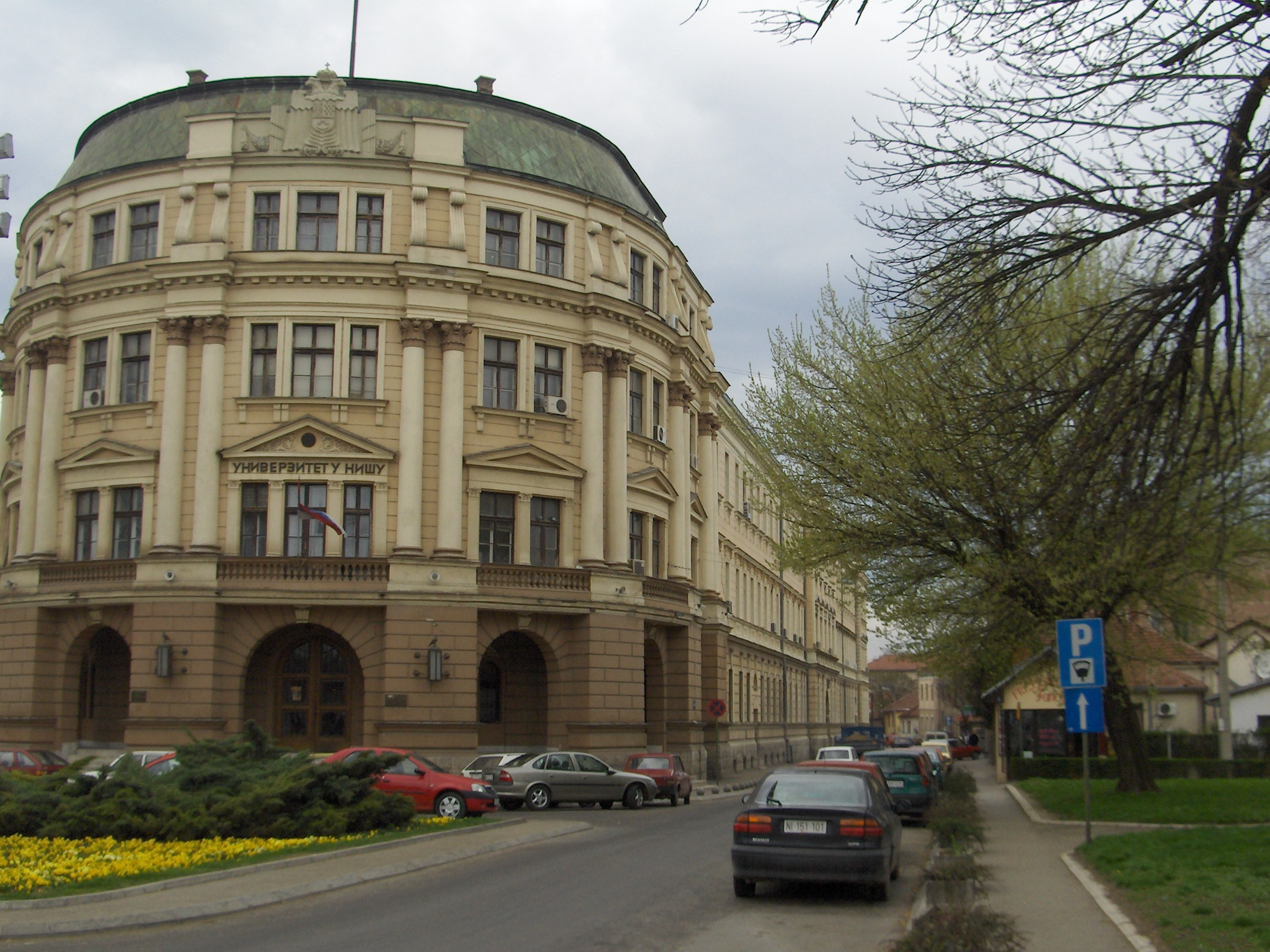
- The Banovina building in Niš (which has been part of the University of Niš since 1966) where the treaty was signed
- Signed: 17 September 1914
- Location: Niš, Kingdom of Serbia
- Negotiators: (Kingdom of Serbia) Nikola Pašić; Essad Pasha Toptani
- Signatories: Kingdom of Serbia; Republic of Central Albania

The Treaty of Serbian–Albanian Alliance, also known as the Treaty of Niš, was a secret treaty signed in Niš between Albanian politician Essad Pasha Toptani and Serbian prime minister Nikola Pašić on 17 September 1914.

== Background ==
On 17 May 1914 Essad Pasha Toptani was accused of assisting the Peasant Revolt against Prince William of Wied. He was exiled to Italy on 20 May without trial. In Italy, he was received with honor since both Italian and Austrian representatives played roles in intrigues that surrounded the revolt. Only a week after prince Wilhelm of Wied's departure from Durrës on 3 September 1914, another violent revolt arose. The rebels managed to lay siege on Durrës, imprison Wied's supporters, to call for a Muslim prince and to establish a Senate for Central Albania.

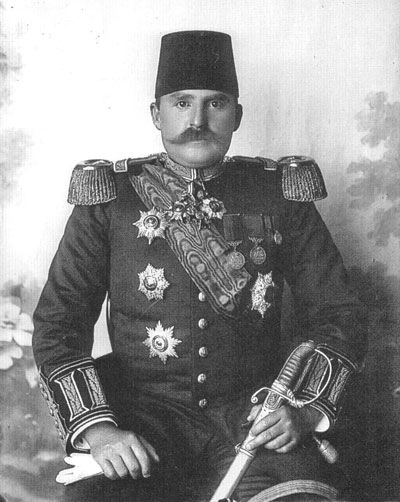
Essad Pasha Toptani

== The Treaty ==
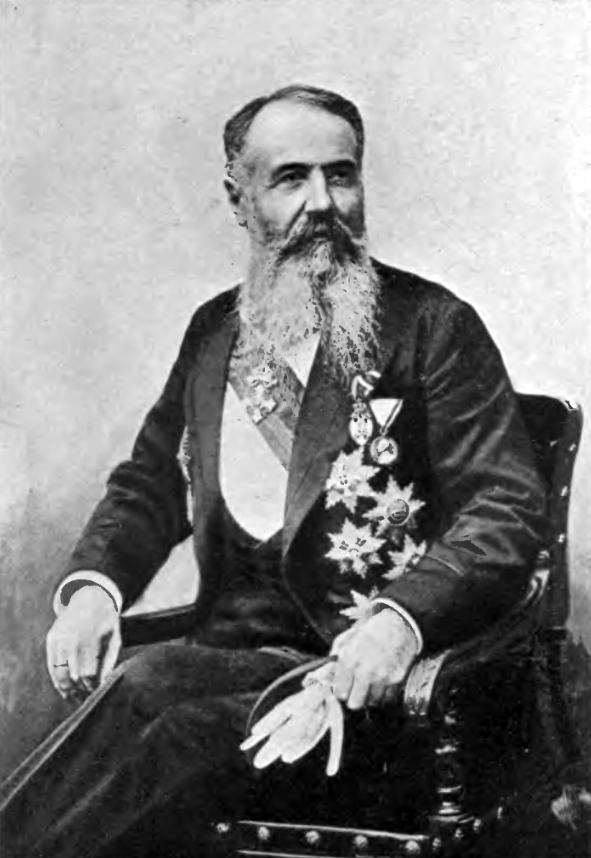
Nikola Pašić

During the autumn 1914 Essad Pasha decided to accept the invitation of the Senate of Central Albania to return and lead them. First he travelled to Niš, Kingdom of Serbia, where he and the Serbian prime minister Nikola Pašić signed the secret treaty of Serbian-Albanian alliance on 17 September 1914. The treaty was signed in the Banovina building (which has been part of the University of Niš since 1966), which is close to Niš fortress.

The treaty had fifteen points which aimed at setting up a Serbian-Albanian political and military institutions and a military alliance between Albania and the Kingdom of Serbia. The treaty envisaged, in its first point, a long lasting peace and friendship between the two countries. According to the treaty's second point Albania and Serbia obliged themselves to not sign any treaties with other countries from which Serbia's or Albania's position would be weakened.

Per point number four of the treaty, Serbia obliged itself to help the formation of an Albanian national council, where all tribes would be represented. The council would have legislative power and have the ability to nominate judges. The treaty ensured military support of the Kingdom of Serbia to reinforce Essad Pasha's position as Albanian ruler and it projected a future demarcation of the border between Albania and Serbia by a Serbo-Albanian commission. In its 11th point, a railroad to Durrës was added as part of the deal. The treaty allowed Essad Pasha to change some clauses because the treaty would need the agreement of the Albanian National Assembly. This would be possible after Pasha was elected ruler. Serbia contracted to supply a military intervention to protect Pasha's rule and to subsidise his gendarmerie by paying 50,000 dinars per month for Albanian military supplies.

The point 10 of the treaty which talked about the Serbo-Albanian commission that would demarcate the border clearly revealed that the treaty did not recognize the borders of Albania as decided by the London Conference of 1912–1913. Point 13 of the treaty excluded illegal crossings of the future border between Serbia and Albania, however it made an exception for when one side asks for help; that point of the treaty is interpreted that it would have been used by Serbia for future military interventions within Albania, prompted by potential Esad's requests.

The treaty's text was written in Turkish, using Arabic letters, whereas Esad Pasha's signature was in Latin letters. A copy of the treaty was also made in Serbian.

== Aftermath ==
In October 1914 Essad Pasha returned to Albania. With Italian and Serbian financial backing he established armed forces in Dibër and captured the interior of Albania and Durrës.

== Sources ==
- Rahimi, Shukri (1986). "Marreveshjet e qeverisë serbe me Esat pashë Toptanin gjatë viteve 1914-1915". Gjurmime Historike të Rilindjes Kombëtare. Prishtina: Albanological Institute of Prishtina. pp. 291–319.
