= Shahin Dino =

Albanian politician

Shahin Dino was an Albanian politician and diplomat in the Ottoman Empire and independent Albania.

He was born in Preveza in modern Greece during the 19th century to the notable local Dino family. In 1897 he was one of the local volunteer irregulars who defended Preveza during the Greco-Turkish War of 1897 against Greek troops. During the Second Constitutional Era of the Ottoman Empire he was elected deputy of the sanjak of Preveza. After the declaration of independence of Albania he served as Minister of Interior from September 17, 1914 to January 27, 1916.
