= Durrës Castle =

Cultural heritage monument in Durrës, Albania

Durrës Castle Kalaja e Durrësit
- Durrës, Albania
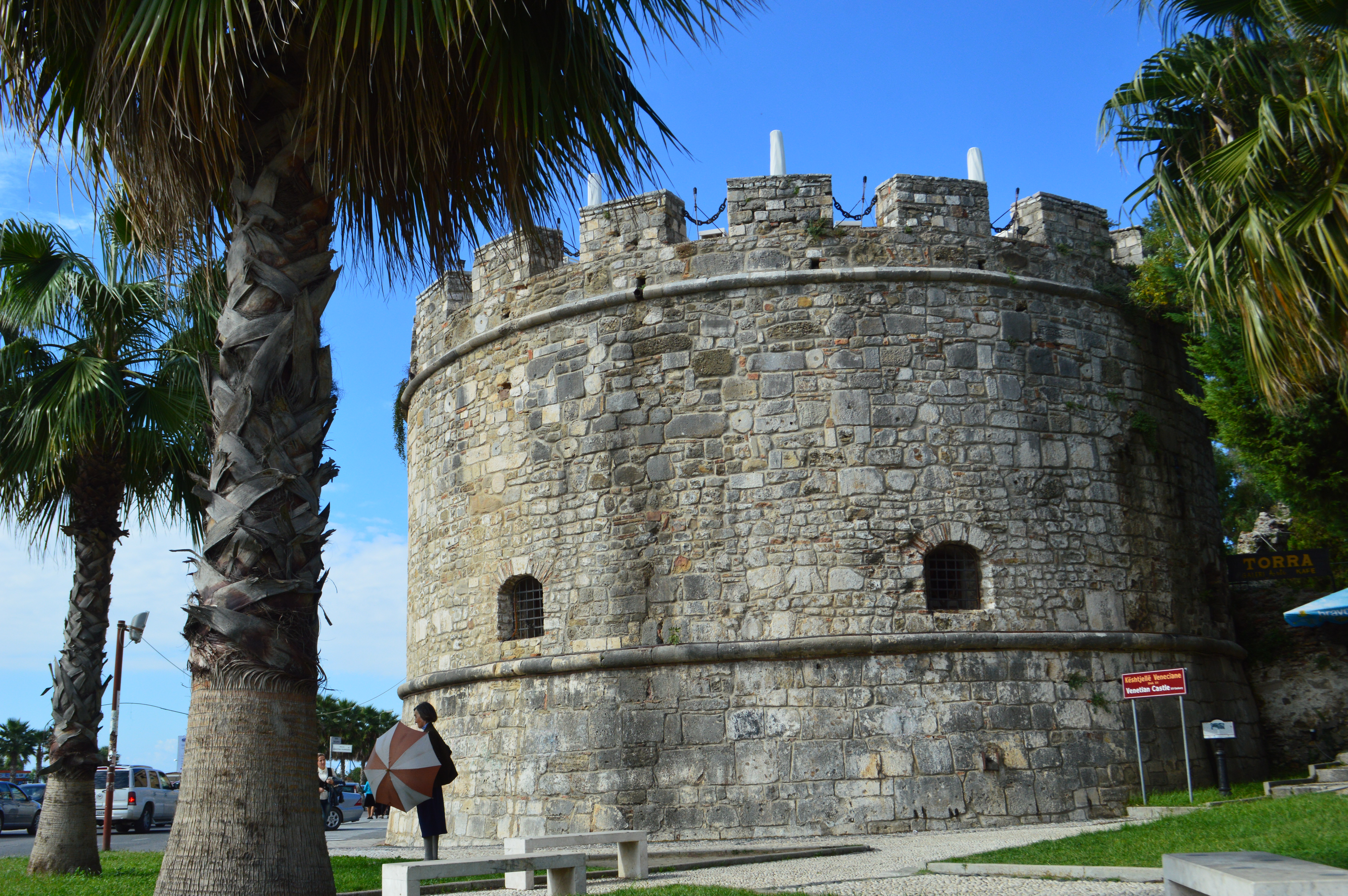
- Venetian Tower of Durrës

Site information
- Owner: Albania
- Controlled by: Byzantine Empire; Kingdom of Albania; Principality of Albania; Republic of Venice; Ottoman Empire; The Big Four (World War I); Albania

Location
- Location within Albania
- Coordinates: 41.3097°N 19.4470°E

Site history
- Built: 1st century BC (final form in 5th century)
- Built by: Final form created by Emperor of the Byzantine Empire Anastasius I Dicorus
- Battles/wars: Battle of Dyrrhachium (1018), Battle of Dyrrhachium (1081), Battle of Durrës (1939)
- Events: Miss Shqipëria 2009

Durrës Castle (Albanian: Kalaja e Durrësit) is the fortified old city of Durrës, Albania. It is enclosed by city walls built in the late 5th century, and repaired and reinforced in the Middle Ages and early modern periods.

== History ==
The castle was built by the Byzantine Emperor Anastasius I (r. 491–518), a native of Durrës (ancient Dyrrhachium), who was born into an Illyro-Roman family. At the time, Anastasius made the city one of the most fortified cities on the Adriatic. During this time a second, smaller castle was built 7km north of Durrës, modern day "Porto Romano" (The Roman's Gate). The ancient walls were devastated in an earthquake in 1273, and had to be extensively repaired.

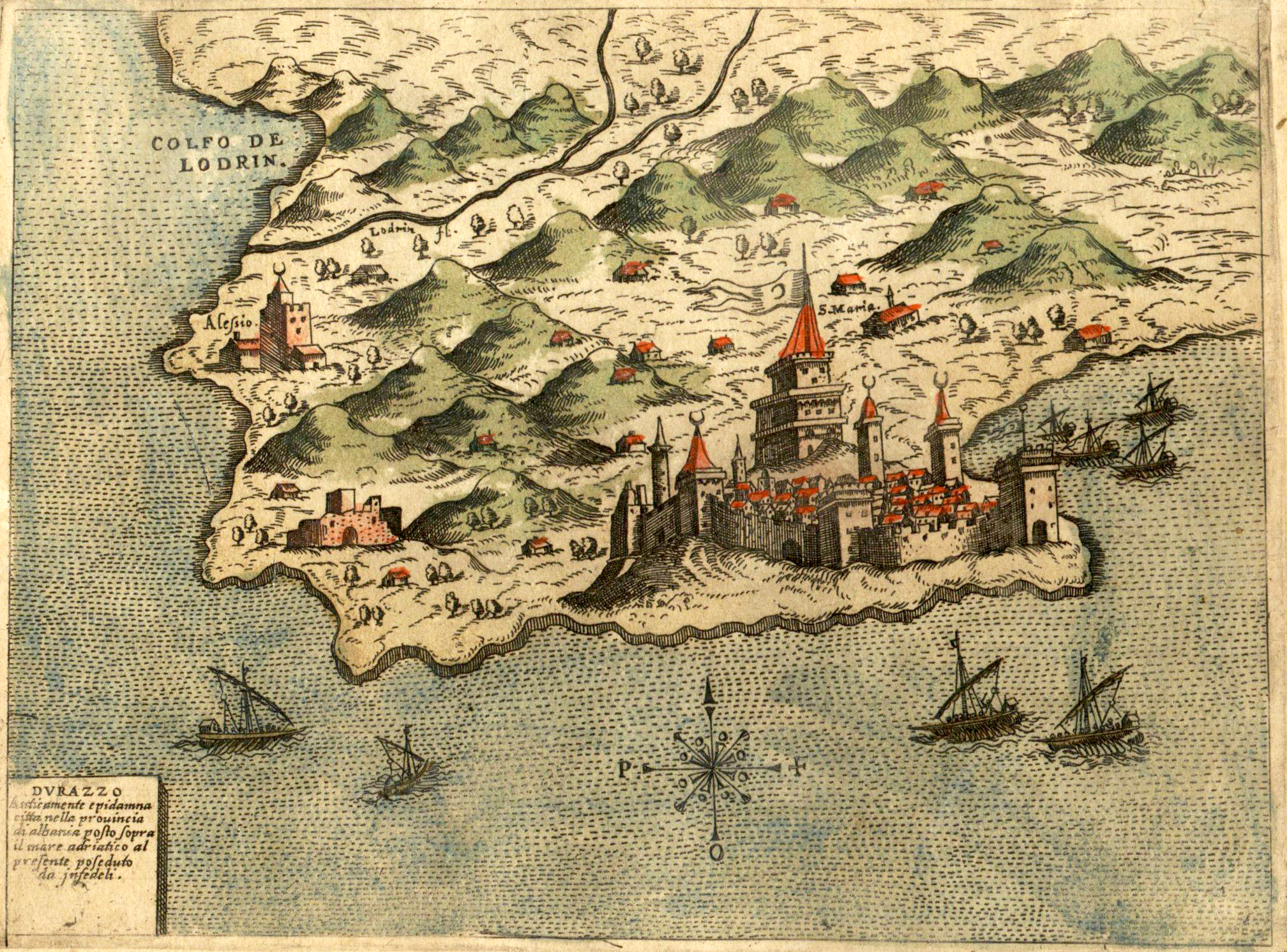
Durrës Castle in 1573

After the Venetians seized Durrës in 1392 from Gjergj Thopia, they set to improve the castles already impressive fortifications, reinforcing it with several guard towers. The walls are quoted as early as the 11th century by Byzantine princess and historian Anna Komnene in her Alexiad as having been so thick, that "four horsemen could ride abreast on top of them". The castle remained under Venetian sovereignty until 1501, when Durrës fell to the Ottoman Empire, which would end up holding the city until 1912. During Ottoman Rule, the walls were again reinforced. Currently the medieval walls stand at nearly 15 feet (4.6 meters) in height and the three entrances of some of the fortification towers are preserved in nearly one-third of the original length of the city walls.

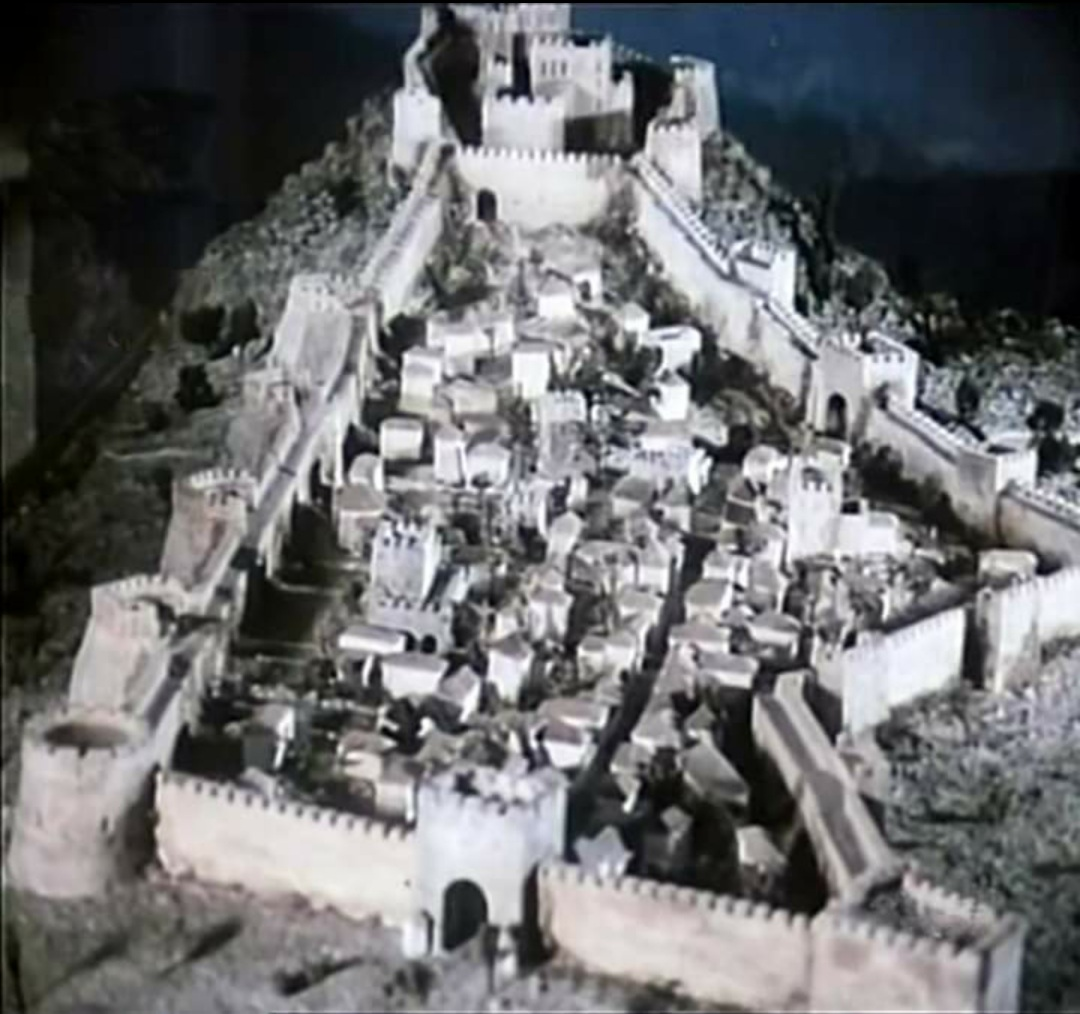
Durrës during the middle ages

On 7 April 1939, Albanian patriots fought the Italian invasion of Albania. In Durrës, a force of only 360 Albanians, mostly gendarmes and townspeople, led by Abaz Kupi, the commander of the gendarmerie in Durrës, and Mujo Ulqinaku, a marine official, tried to halt the Italian advance. Armed only with small arms and three machine guns, they succeeded in keeping the Italians at bay for several hours until a large number of light tanks disembarked from the latter's naval vessels. After that, resistance diminished and within five hours the Italian forces had captured the entire city.

== Modern ==
In February 2022 it was announced that United Nations Office for Project Services (UNOPS) would begin a restoration project of Durrës Castle, focusing on the main Durrës tower by the EU4Cult Group in Albania. This restoration project was presumed to take 6 months to complete, with the cost of investment for the project being 675,000 euros. This project planned to conserve and upgrade the infrastructure of the tower, adding new digital and classic interpretations of the tower, as well as other modern advancements to aid in the building as a cultural site. This restoration was planned to turn the Durrës tower into the first heritage interpretation center in Albania.

== Gallery ==
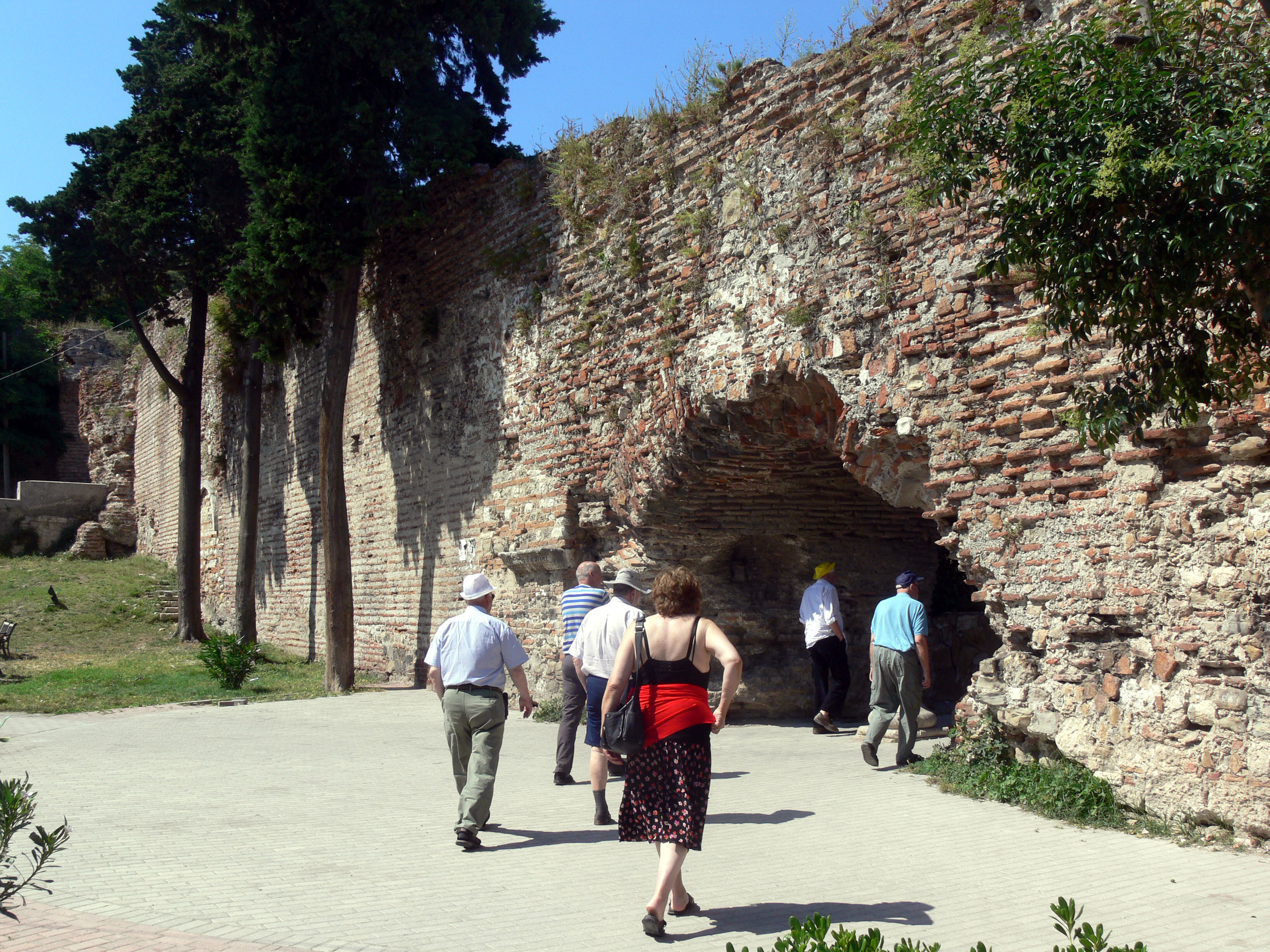
Durrës Ancient City Wall Entrance

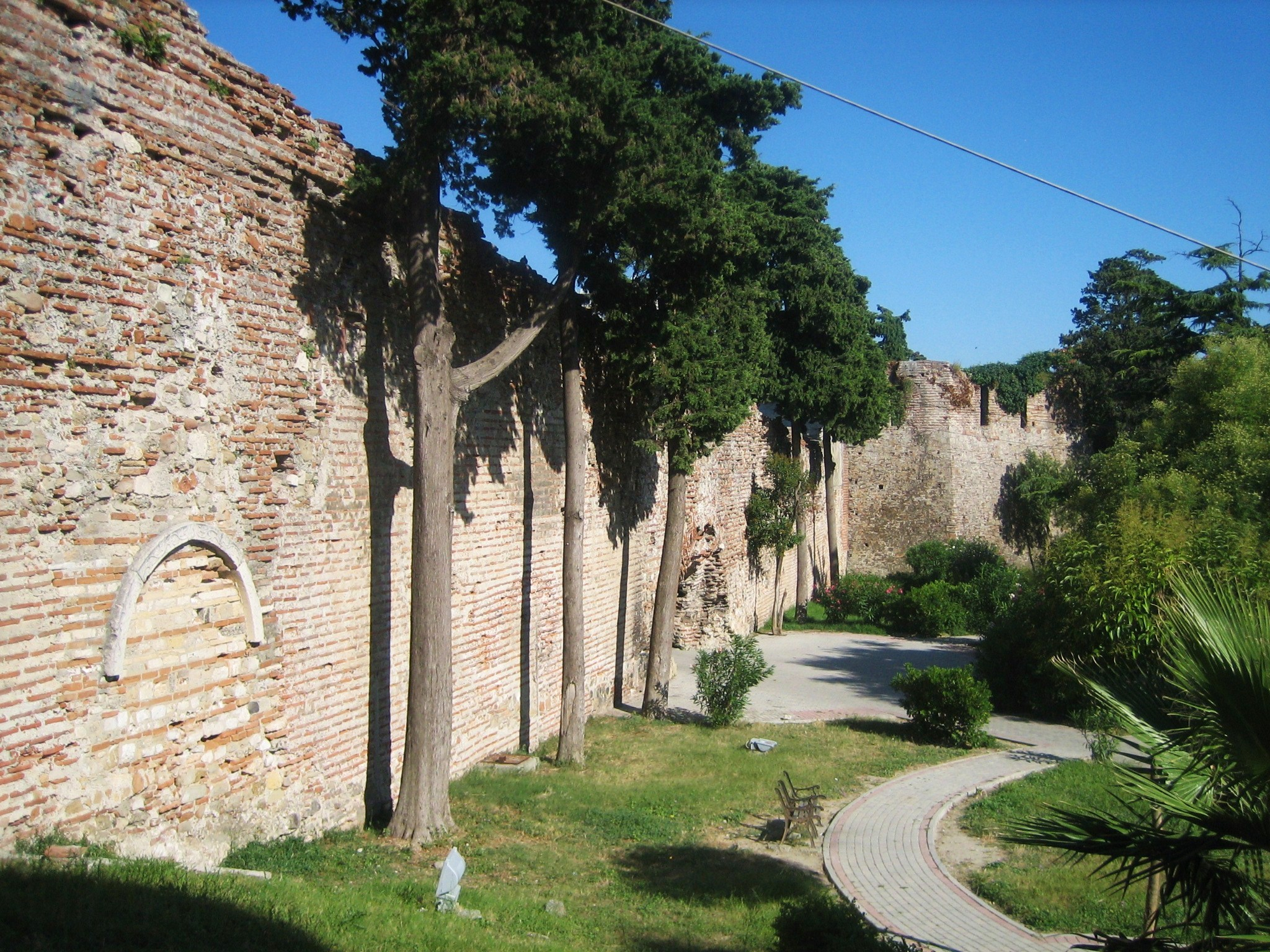
Durrës city wall in 2009

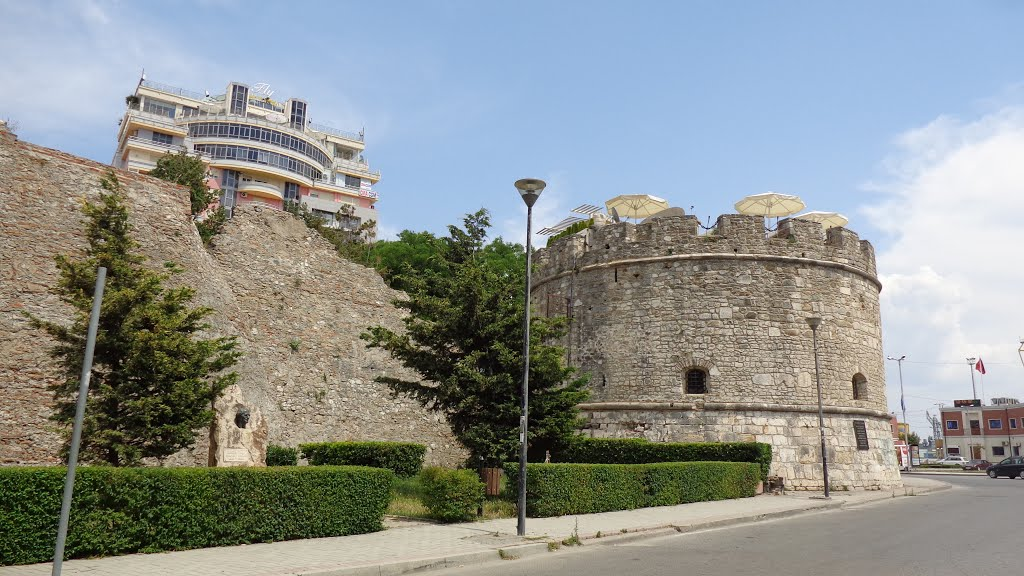
Venetian tower

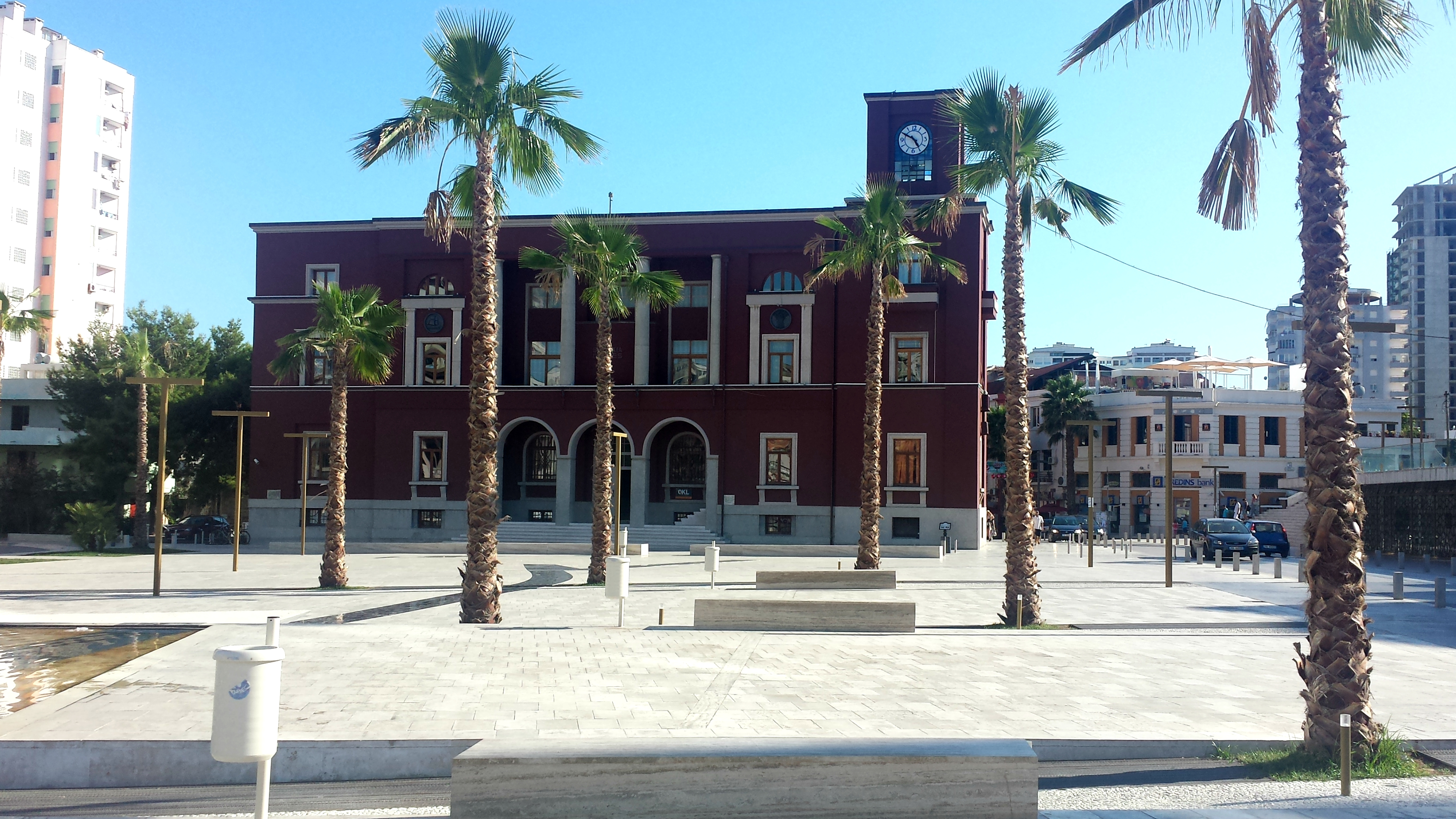
Liria Square

== See also ==
- Durrës
- History of Albania
- Venetian Albania
- Anastasius I (emperor)
- Thopia family
- Karl Thopia
- Italian invasion of Albania
- Mujo Ulqinaku
- Tourism in Albania
- List of castles in Albania
- Architecture of Albania
