= Musa Qazimi =

Albanian politician and rebel (1864–1915)

- Born: 1864; Tirana, Ottoman Empire (modern Albania)
- Died: 7 July 1915 (aged 50–51); Tirana, Albania
- Occupations: teacher, mufti, politician
- Known for: Peasant Revolt in Albania

Musa Qazimi (1864 – 7 July 1915) was an Albanian politician and rebel. A Turcophile mufti, he was first the mayor (1904-1908), then the mufti (1908-1913), and finally the prefect of Tirana (1913-1914). In the turbulent period after the Albanian declaration of independence from the Ottoman Empire, he was first a supporter of the Young Turks, then of Essad Pasha. After he broke with Essad Pasha, he defected and became a leader in the sectarian, reactionary and clerically tinged pro-Ottoman revolt against the new Albanian state's authorities. While the official head of the movement was Haxhi Qamili and the head of its armed forces was Mustafa Ndroqi, Qazimi has been considered to be the ideological inspiration of the movement., and the "real leader" of the uprising. After the revolt was shattered by a makeshift alliance consisting of Mirdita Catholics, local resistance, Kosovar Albanians led by Isa Boletini and some foreign volunteers mainly from Romania, he was found guilty of orchestrating the slaughter that occurred during his revolt against supporters of the Albanian national movement as well as Bektashis and Christians, and he was executed on July 7, 1915.

== Early life ==
Musa was born in 1864 in Tirana. After finishing his education in the mekteb (religious school), he studied in a madresa until the age of 28, at which point he received his diploma. After graduating, he became a teacher.

== Career in politics ==
In 1904, he was appointed kaymakam of at the time the Kaza of Tirana, a post which he served until 1908. In 1908, he became the mufti of Tirana.

In 1912, Albania declared independence from the Ottoman Empire, and while the government of Ismail Kemal, which had issued the Albanian declaration of independence, claimed sovereignty over the entire country, the reality was more complicated due to hostilities between Albanian and Ottoman forces, local anarchy, and the ensuing Balkan Wars. Various factions arose that vied for control over the different regions of Albania. Ideologically, at this time, Qazimi was a supporter of the Young Turks, who were still aiming to reincorporate Albania into the Ottoman Empire.

== Alliance with Essad Pasha Toptani ==
After Albanian independence, many rich Muslim landowners, together with Muslim clergy such as Qazimi, remained loyal to the Ottoman Empire and were afraid of losing their privileged status after the signing of the London Peace Treaty and the decision of the Great Powers about the future status of the territory which today belongs to Albania. They maintained close contacts with the government of the Young Turks in Istanbul, which was still hoping to restore Ottoman suzerainty over Albania. The Young Turks sent agents to co-opt their fears with the aim of reincorporating Albania into the Ottoman Empire.

They found an ally in Essad Pasha Toptani, a powerful Albanian warlord from the illustrious Toptani family who had become famous for his role in the defense of Shkodra. Essad Pasha became the head of the emerging Republic of Central Albania. The Kingdom of Serbia also agreed to support Essad Pasha's government financially, and even with military force if needed. In exchange, Essad Pasha agreed to neutralize a large group of about 20,000 kachaks led by Albanian nationalist Isa Boletini from Kosovo and Macedonia. They were led by Isa Boletini and supported by Kemal and his Provisional Government of Albania. Essad Pasha agreed to help the Kingdom of Serbia acquire part of the coastal areas north of Black Drin.

Qazimi strongly sympathized with Essad Pasha's desire to have a Muslim, rather than Christian, prince ruling Albania., and he became an ally of Essad Pasha's faction. When Essad Pasha captured Tirana, he threw out Refik Toptani, the previous prefect of the region, and installed Qazimi in his place.

However, when Essad Pasha lost the allegiance of the Muslim clerical and land-owning class when he began to reconcile with the newly established "heathen" Prince Wied; Musa Qazimi thus became Essad Pasha's enemy. Essad Pasha thus played a role in the psychological preparation of the following uprising in which Musa Qazimi would come to play a critical role.

== Role in Revolt of Haxhi Qamili ==
=== Defection ===
On 17 May 1914, a revolt broke out in the countryside nearby Tirana, led by the charismatic sheikh Haxhi Qamili and a group of other Muslim clerics. The rebels fought under the Ottoman flag and opposed the rule of Prince Weid, who was both a Christian and a foreigner. They opposed the separation of Albania from the Ottoman Empire. The motto of the rebels was "Duam, duam Babën-- Turqinë!" (We want, we want our father—Turkey) and they raised the flag of the Ottoman Empire and restored Ottoman Turkish as the national language.

When the rebels entered Tirana, Musa Qazimi joined them, and raised the Ottoman flag over the city. Qazimi joined the rebels and publicly demanded the eviction of Prince Wied from the throne.

=== Trajectory ===
On 3 June after capturing Shijak, the rebels convened and decided that landowner Mustafa Ndroqi and cleric Haxhi Qamili were the public leaders of the movement; however, Musa Qazimi had the most power behind the scenes. They then launched their first attack on Durrës. Prince Wied called for help from anyone who could provide it; however, forces in South Albania were occupied resisting Greek attempts to annex the area, so help could only come from Durrës itself and the north. Local Albanians in Durrës took up arms to defend the city, and they were reinforced by a troop of Kosovars led by Isa Boletini and Bajram Curri as well as a troop of Catholic Albanians from Mirdita led by Prenk Bib Doda. The fighting in Durrës was mostly inconclusive, and there were considerable losses on both sides. Wied tried to make a deal with the rebels led by Qazimi, Ndroqi and Qamili, but they refused all his offers, saying that they would only recognize the legitimacy of a Muslim prince under the Ottoman Sultan's suzerainty.

Frustrated by their inability to obtain a victory in Durrës, Qazimi's rebels retreated, and concentrated on surrounding areas in Central Albania. On 23 June Elbasan fell to the rebels despite some local resistance, and during the summer other cities followed in succession: Lushnjë, Berat, Fier and Pogradec. In the fight for Pogradec, the rebels killed Gani Butka, the son of Sali Butka. Seeing their chance, Greek forces overran the regions of Përmet, Korçë and Tepelenë, and the Greek "North Epirotes" met with Qamili in Pogradec, where they reached an agreement to fight their mutual enemies.

On 3 September Prince Wied fled the country, and two days later, the rebels captured Durrës. On 5 September 1914, Musa Qazimi personally entered the Royal Palace of Durrës, and rose the Ottoman flag there. The rebels announced a "General Council" (Këshillin e Përgjithshëm) with Mustafa Ndroqi as president. Their first decision was to send a message to Istanbul asking the Sultan to unite Albania with Turkey or send a Muslim prince to his dependence. Afterwards, a new Turkish commission arrived from Istanbul to run the rebel forces as according to Turkish policy.

=== Executions overseen as head of "disciplinary forces" ===
Within the revolt, Musa Qazimi was the head of the "disciplinary forces". He used this position to carry out slaughters in the name of "cleansing" the "Bektashi schismatics" (Bektashinjtë përçarës). Musa Qazimi is said to have been an inspiration to his leader Haxhi Qamili.

Other targets besides "Bektashi schismatics" included Christians, Albanian nationalist teachers who had been teaching using the Latin alphabet, and even Muslim clerics who were supporters of Albanian nationhood.

One famous man who was attacked by the men of Musa Qazimi was Babe Dud Karbunara, a teacher in Berat in then-illegal Albanian schools during Ottoman times, a leader in the earlier Albanian revolt against Ottoman rule and delegate at the Albanian declaration of independence at the Assembly of Vlore. When Qazimi's forces captured Berat, Musa Qazimi ordered Karbunara to be seized from his house and humiliated the man by dragging him through the streets, his arms and legs bound in chains. In front of a crowd of Berat citizens, Musa Qazimi had his men beat Babe Dud Karbunara, and ripped his beard out from his face. Famously, Musa Qazimi asked Babe Dud Karbunara, "Who are you, an Ottoman or an Albanian?" and Karbunara retorted back "And you, in what language are you speaking to me? I am an Albanian as you are!"

== Downfall ==
Before long however, the fortunes of the revolt dissipated and it was soon crushed, by the combined forces of the Albanian government, Kosovar militias under the command of Isa Boletini, Catholic forces from Mirdita, and some Romanian mercenaries. The leaders of the revolt, including Musa Qazimi, were tried and found guilty of various charges. Musa Qazimi was charged with murder for the executions he oversaw. On 7 July 1915 he was executed beside his comrade Hajdar Hoxha, and not long after Haxhi Qamili was executed too.
