= Babë Dud Karbunara =

Albanian teacher and politician

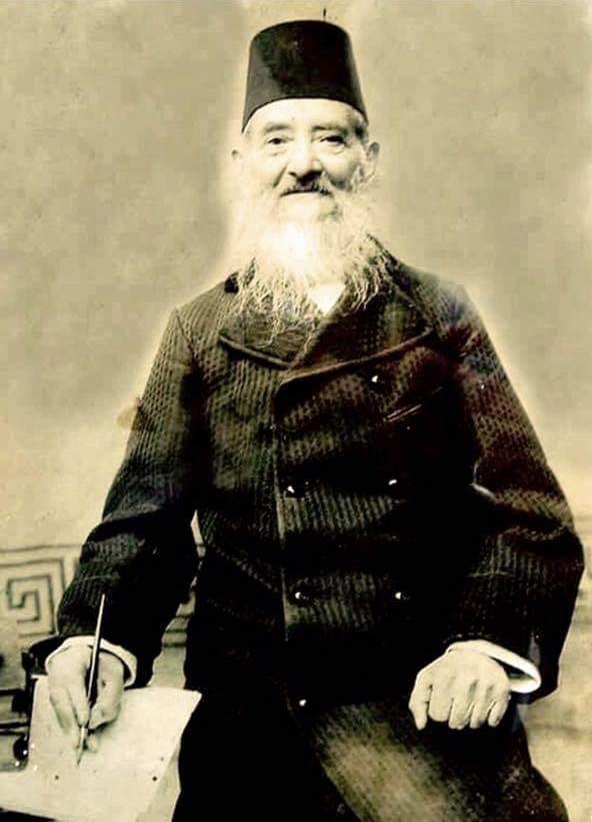
- Born: Jorgji Karbunara; 22 April 1842; Berat, Sanjak of Berat, Ottoman Empire, (modern Albania)
- Died: 19 December 1917 (aged 75); Berat, Albania

Babë Dud Karbunara (22 April 1842 – 19 December 1917), born Jorgji Karbunara was an Albanian teacher and politician. He was one of the signatories of the Albanian Declaration of Independence.

== Early life ==
His grandfather had moved from Trozhar near Tërpan to Berat, where his son Theodhor later worked as a gold work embroiderer. Babë Dud Karbunara, son of Theodhor, was born as Jorgji Karbunara on April 22, 1842, in the Kala neighborhood of Berat. He initially studied in Corfu and later continued his studies in Trieste.

== Career ==
During the League of Prizren era he started an emigre branch of the organization in Corfu. Karbunara's activism primarily focused on the opening of Albanian-language schools in his native region, Berat. Karbunara's activity as a teacher of Albanian was banned in the 1890s and it led to his house being burnt by Ottoman agents on September 14, 1894. After the establishment of the 1908 constitution, along with other Rilindas of the city, he opened two Albanian-language schools in Berat. During the Albanian Revolt of 1912 he organized the assembly of Sinjë, where the rebel bands of southern Albania signed the memorandum of Sinjë, a list of demands regarding Albanian rights in the Ottoman state.

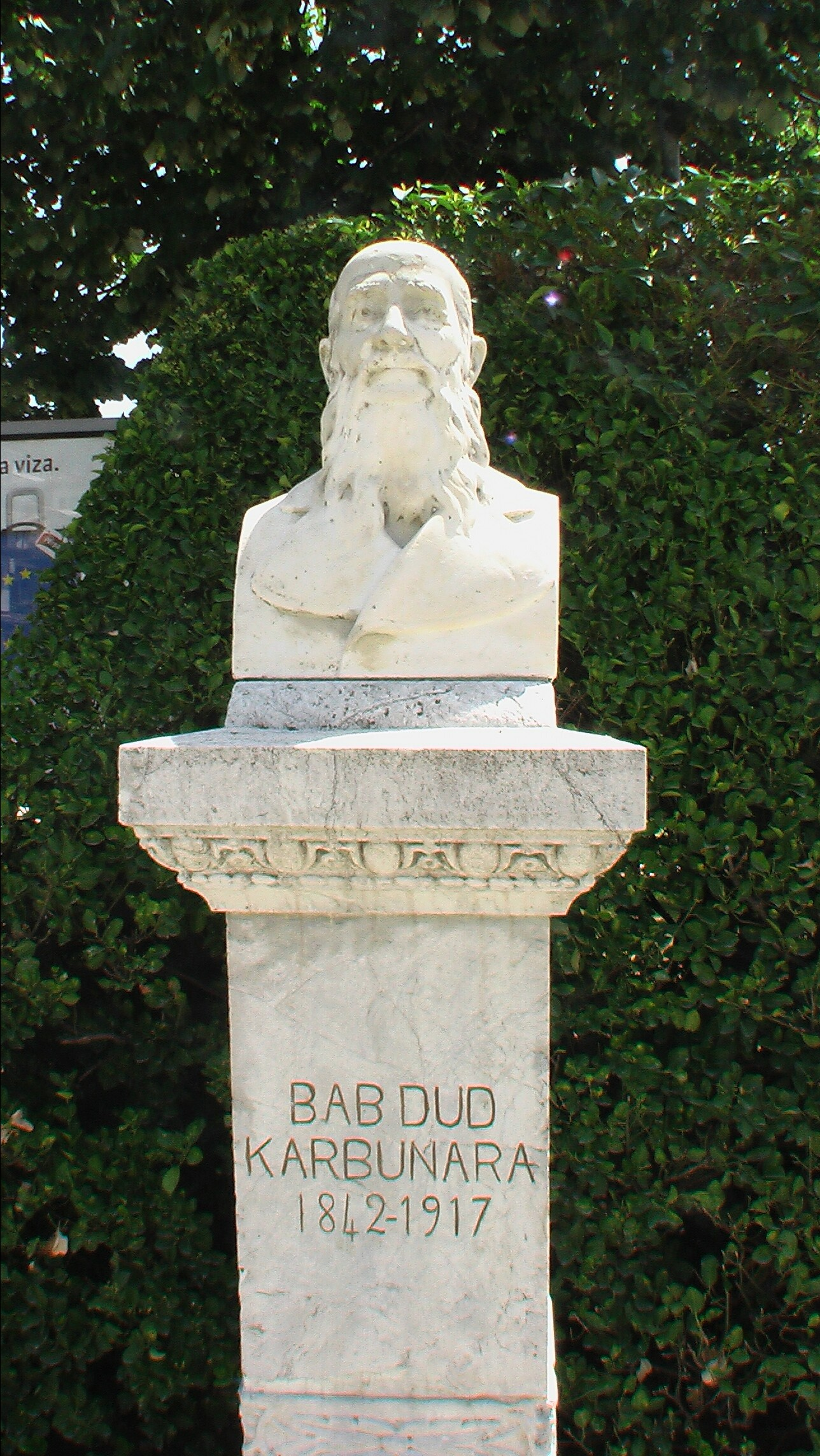
Monument in Berat

In November 1912, he participated as a delegate and signatory of Berat in the Assembly of Vlorë, in which the independence of Albania was declared and a national congress was formed. The deputies of the national congress also elected eighteen delegates of the assembly to form the Albanian Senate, of which Ajdin Draga was a member as a senator of Berat.
On June 30, 1914, he was attacked by pro-Ottoman Islamic rebels led by Essadist Musa Qazimi. He was brutally beaten after being questioned "Are you Albanian or Osman (Ottoman)?", and after answering "Albanian, just like you are".

== Death ==
He died on December 19, 1917, and was buried in the cemetery of St. George's church of the city. The ceremony was held in Mangalem neighborhood church, with a huge participation of the town's population. Vatra's musical band came from Boston to pay respect to him at his grave.

== Honours ==
In 1937, a bust of Karbunara by sculptor Dhimitër Çani was presented in Berat, while during the Communist era he was posthumously awarded the Mësues i Popullit (English: Teacher of the People) medal. Today, a high school in Berat keeps the name "Babë Dud Karbunara" in his honour.
