= Haxhi Qamili =

18/19th–century Albanian Activist and Rebel

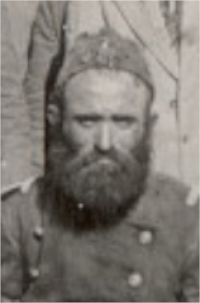
- Born: 1876; Sharrë, Ottoman Empire (modern Albania)
- Died: 16 August 1915 (aged 38–39); Durrës, Albania
- Known for: Peasant Revolt in Albania

Haxhi Qamili, born Qamil Zyber Xhameta, (1876 – 16 August 1915) was an Albanian rebel who was a leader of two pro-Ottoman revolts by Muslims in Albania from 1914 to 1915. He was popularly known by his religious name Haxhi Qamili, though he was also known as Baba Qamili (Father Qamil).

== Biography ==
=== Early life ===
Qamili was a villager from Sharra (in Tirana) and was the Sheikh of a tekke belonging to the Melami order of dervishes that sought social equality and rejected wealth and luxury.

=== Muslim revolt ===
The uprising began in mid-May 1914, but had its origins in 1913. The rebellion was mainly uphold by illiterate peasants that fearing to lose the lands they were given during the Ottoman Empire objected the laws of a foreign ruler. The uprising base was in the regions of Shijak, Kavaja and Tirana.

On 3 June 1914, the rebels, who were led by mufti Musa Qazim Beqari, made their demands known at a gathering in Kavaja, among which was the overthrow of the Western-installed Prince Wied. The Muslim insurgents demanded the reunion of Albania with the Ottoman state or at least to be ruled by an Ottoman caliph, the reinstatement of the Shariah, the removal of the Albanian flag and its replacement with the Ottoman flag.

The revolt gained moderate success in central Albania, being able to seize Lushnjë and on 1 September Vlorë. Two days later, Prince Wied in Durrës was forced to abandon his six-month kingdom and the Muslim rebels legislated the re-union of Albania with the Ottoman state.

With Wied removed, Essad Pasha, who had the support of Italy, returned from exile in October 1914.

==== Characteristics ====
Haxhi Qamili's inspiration was Musa Qazimi, a local mufti who supported the Young Turks' policies. Haxhi Qamili referred to Christians as "kaurrët" (i.e. "heathens", a very pejorative slur when applied by Muslims to Christians) and "bad people... who even God doesn't love". During his pro-Ottoman revolt, Christians were slaughtered and tortured. The movement also attacked Albanian nationalist teachers who had been teaching using the Latin alphabet.

The motto of the rebels was "Duam, duam Babën-- Turqinë!" (We want, we want our father—Turkey) and they raised the flag of the Ottoman Empire and restored Ottoman Turkish as the national language.

Haxhi Qamili and his movement were opposed by many Albanian Muslims. In the Elbasan region in particular, local Muslim community leaders and other Muslim notables denounced the movement as "archaic" and "fanatical" with many opposing it with arms. Elbasanlli clerics also supported the Latin alphabet, opposing Haxhi Qamili's view and also the views of more conservative Sunni clerics elsewhere. Rebels killed several Muslim clerics who were involved in Albanian nationalist cycles.

The rebellion was only tacitly supported by the Ottomans, who as a consequence of the Balkan Wars were physically separated from the Albanian lands. The Ottoman preoccupation with the looming First World War also rendered diplomatic and material support impractical.

=== War with Essad Pasha ===
Essad Pasha Toptani, a supporter of the feudal lords, took power with Serbian support. Qamili became one of the leaders of the renewed rebellion and was elected by the Islamic rebels as their commander-in-chief. by the end of November 1914, the rebels had regained the upper hand in Tirana and burnt Essad Pasha's palace to the ground. The rebellion achieved rapid successes, confining Essad's government of central Albania to Durrës itself.

In May 1915 Qamili was elected leader of the rebels.

=== Death ===
In an effort to aid Essad's government and to further its own territorial aims, the Kingdom of Serbia launched an invasion of central Albania on June 2, 1915, but was promptly met by resistance led by Qamili at Qukës where, however, the rebels' outnumbered and outgunned forces were defeated by the Serbs. Through this intervention the "rebellion, with [its] vague, unsettled political objectives, which did, nevertheless, have both a popular and a social basis" was suppressed. The Serbian forces arrested Qamili and other rebel leaders and sent them as prisoners to Durrës, where they were tried in a court presided over by Xhelal Bey Zogu and sentenced to be hanged.

== Analysis ==
Enver Hoxha believed that the peasant movement under Qamili's direction was primarily one of the rural poor, which relied upon traditional forms of government such as village councils to organize and direct a struggle against feudal interests. Qamili preached that all property in excess of personal needs should be given to the impoverished, quoting the Quran and also expressing the sentiment of the Melami sect, which was against the concept of private property. Works published during the communist period stated that the peasant rebels under Qamili's command confiscated the estates of the large landowners, set fire to houses of the beys, and provided support for the poor, infirm and orphans. Hoxha summed up Qamili's movement as being "against the feudal lords, pashas, beys and aghas, landowners and privileges in general."

Modern historiography has criticized this portrayal of Haxhi Qamili and his movement by works published under the communist regime, lambasting them as "Albanian historiography which tried to prove Hoxha's truths instead of searching for the truth". Disputing the communist line that the movement was egalitarian, progressive and "anti-feudal", Kolasi and Rrapaj maintain that the revolt was a "reactionary Muslim uprising" motivated by the "fear of peasants that their lands would be taken by the new government" (during the early period of Albanian independence, a controversial issue was land reform and redistribution to address the situation of disparity whereby Christians had much less land than Muslims due to some discrimination in the time of the Ottoman Empire). Kolasi and Rrapaj also note the desire of peasants for a return to Ottoman rule, the replacement of Albanian with Ottoman Turkish as the official language, and the raising of the Ottoman flag. Lulzim Hoxha meanwhile argues that the movement shows the "worship towards the central authorities as a patrimonial figure" and the perceived "necessity of a central paternal authority" under a "Sultanistic" political culture that he views as inherited from Ottoman rule but continued and sharpened under Enver Hoxha's communist regime noting that the movement used as a slogan "dum Baben" (we want our Father). He analyzes the slaughters of Christians involved as an attempt to "fill up the ideological place prepared and cultivated during the Ottoman dominion with humiliating acts for the Christians".
