= Lodewijk Thomson =

Dutch politician

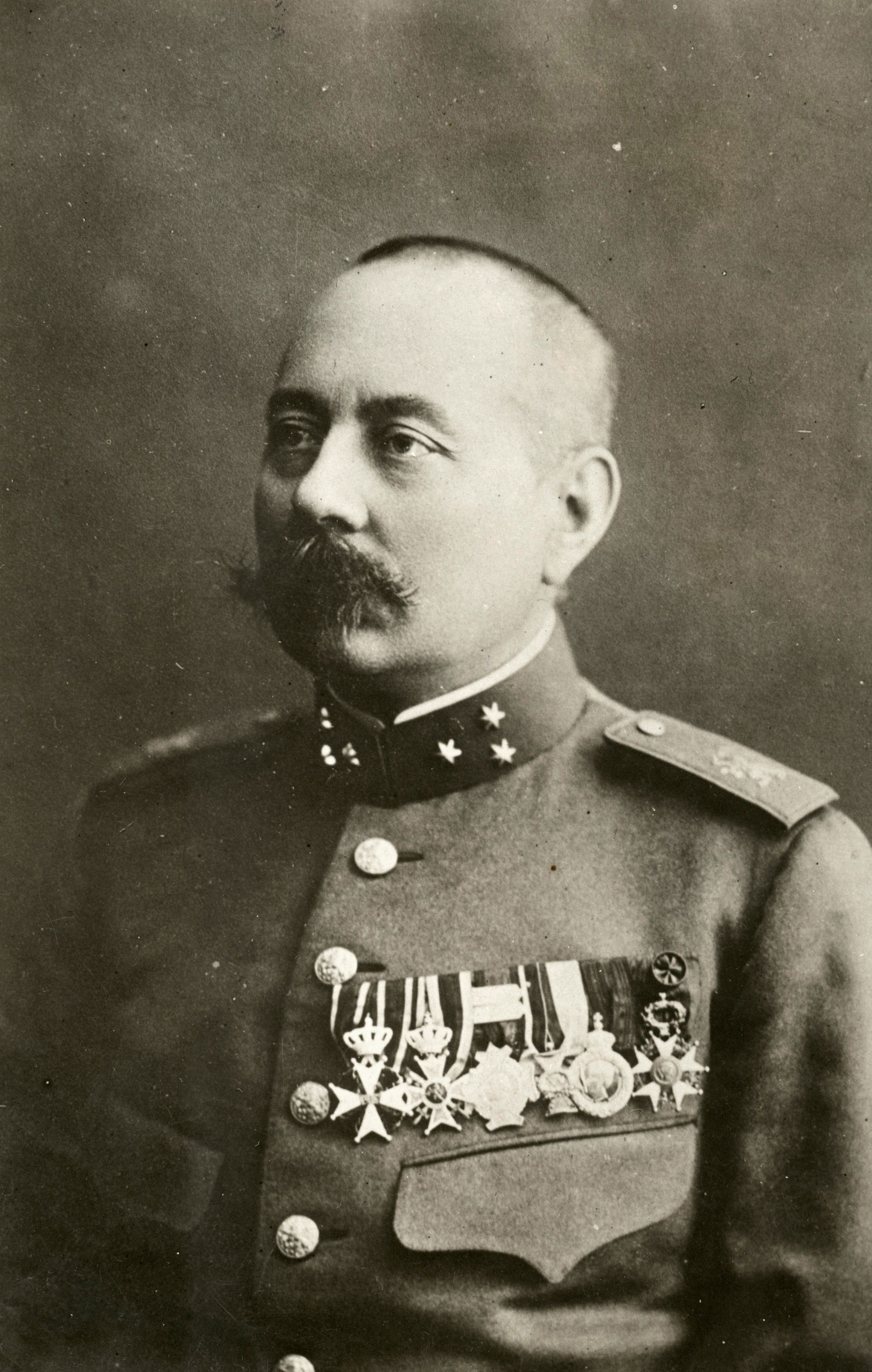
- Thomson in 1905

Member of the House of Representatives
- In office 16 June 1905 – 16 June 1913
- Preceded by: Gerrit Willem Melchers
- Succeeded by: Pieter Jelles Troelstra
- Constituency: Leeuwarden

Personal details
- Born: Lodewijk Willem Johan Karel Thomson; 11 June 1869 Voorschoten, Netherlands
- Died: 15 June 1914 (aged 45) Durrës, Principality of Albania
- Party: Liberal
- Education: Koninklijke Militaire Academie

Military service
- Allegiance: Netherlands; Principality of Albania
- Branch: Royal Netherlands Army; Colonial Reserve Corps; International Gendarmerie
- Service years: 1884–1914
- Rank: Major
- Conflicts: Lombok Intervention; Second Boer War (attaché); First Balkan War (attaché); Muslim Uprising in Albania †
- Awards: Military Order of William; Order of the Netherlands Lion; Order of Orange-Nassau

Lodewijk Willem Johan Karel Thomson (11 June 1869 – 15 June 1914) was a Dutch military commander and politician. He served as a member of the Dutch parliament between 1905 and 1913. In 1914, he became the commander of a newly created International Gendarmerie force in the Principality of Albania. He was killed during fighting in the town of Durrës on 15 June 1914, becoming the first Dutch soldier to be killed during a peacekeeping mission.

== Early life ==
Lodewijk Thomson was born in Voorschoten on 11 June 1869. His father, Bernard Heidenreich Thomson, was a navy medical officer of British origin, while his mother a member of the noble Pompe van Meerdervoort family.

Thomson studied at a Hogere Burgerschool in Rotterdam.

== Political career ==
In the 1905 general election, Thomson was elected to the Dutch House of Representatives for the constituency of Leeuwarden on a Liberal Union ticket. He was re-elected in the 1909 general election, but lost his seat in the 1913 general election.

== Military career ==
Thomson joined the army in 1884, and studied at the Koninklijke Militaire Academie in Breda, holding the rank of a second lieutenant of the infantry. From 1891, he joined a reconnaissance unit and studied cartography. Between 1894 and 1896, he served in the Dutch colonial forces and took part in the Aceh War, where he was awarded the grade of a Knight 4th class of the Military Order of William. In the following years he published various articles on matters of cartography in military journal.

Between 1899 and 1900 he served as a military attaché in South Africa. In 1903, back in the Netherlands, he was given command of the military administration of railways around The Hague during a rail workers' strike. This earned him another decoration, the Order of Orange-Nassau, and promotion to the rank of captain.

During the Balkan Wars of 1912 and 1913, Thomson again served as a military attaché, this time in Greece. In 1914, now holding the rank of major, he was selected as head of the new International Gendarmerie force which was to work under the command of Dutch officers in Albanian service in a peacekeeping function to stabilize the newly independent Principality of Albania.

== Death ==
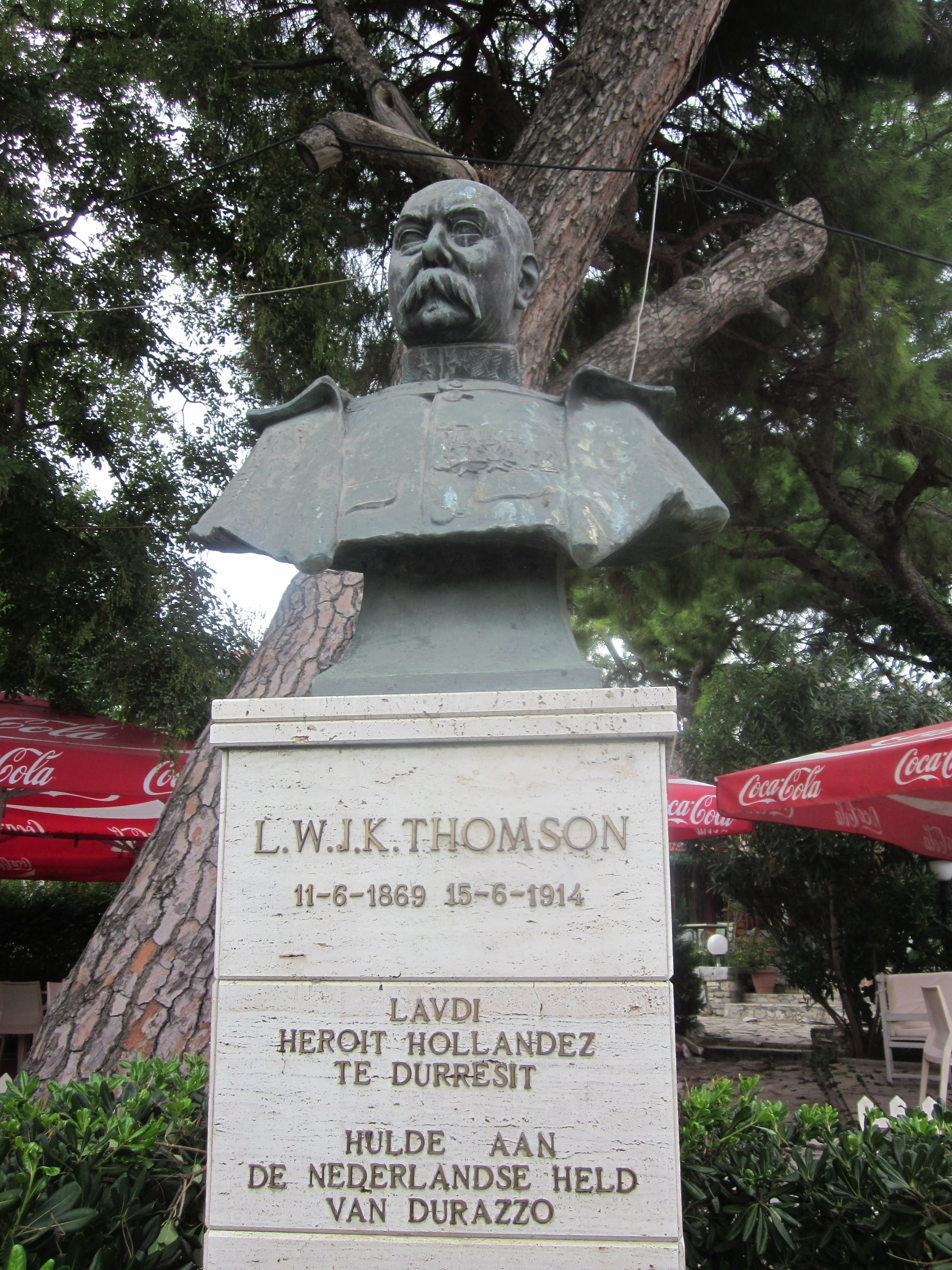
Monument of Lodewijk Thomson in Durrës

On 15 June 1914, his unit was engaged in fighting around the port of Durrës in central Albania, during which he was killed. According to sources, it is probable that an Italian sniper was behind his death.

Thomson was initially buried in Albania. His remains were transferred to the Netherlands a month later and re-buried with great public ceremony in Groningen. As a reaction to Thomson's death and the general failure of the peacekeeping project, the Dutch activity in the Albanian gendarmerie was discontinued a short time later.

=== Legacy ===
A street in Groningen as well as a street and a square in The Hague are named after Thomson. Public statues commemorating him were also erected in both Dutch cities, as well as in Durrës, near the Venetian tower overlooking the port.

On Dutch Veterans' Day, 28 June 2014, a replica of the Groningen Statue was unveiled in the Dutch parliament building to mark the 100th anniversary of Thomson's death.

== Awards and decorations ==
- Knight of the Military Order of William – 1887
- Knight of the Order of the Netherlands Lion – 1913
- Knight of the Order of Orange-Nassau with Swords – 1903
- Silver Honorary Medal for Merit possessed against Public Collections – 1912
- Long Service Medal for Officers
- Officer of the Legion of Honour – 1911
- Officer of the Order of the Redeemer – Greece
- Medal for the Greek–Turkish War of 1912–1913
- Knight of the Order of the Sword – Sweden, 1913
- Knight of the Order of Prince Danilo I – Montenegro
- Knight of the Order of the Black Eagle – Albania, 1914
- Golden Medal of the Eagle – Albania, 2004
