= Ettore Sportiello =

Italian admiral (1882–1948)

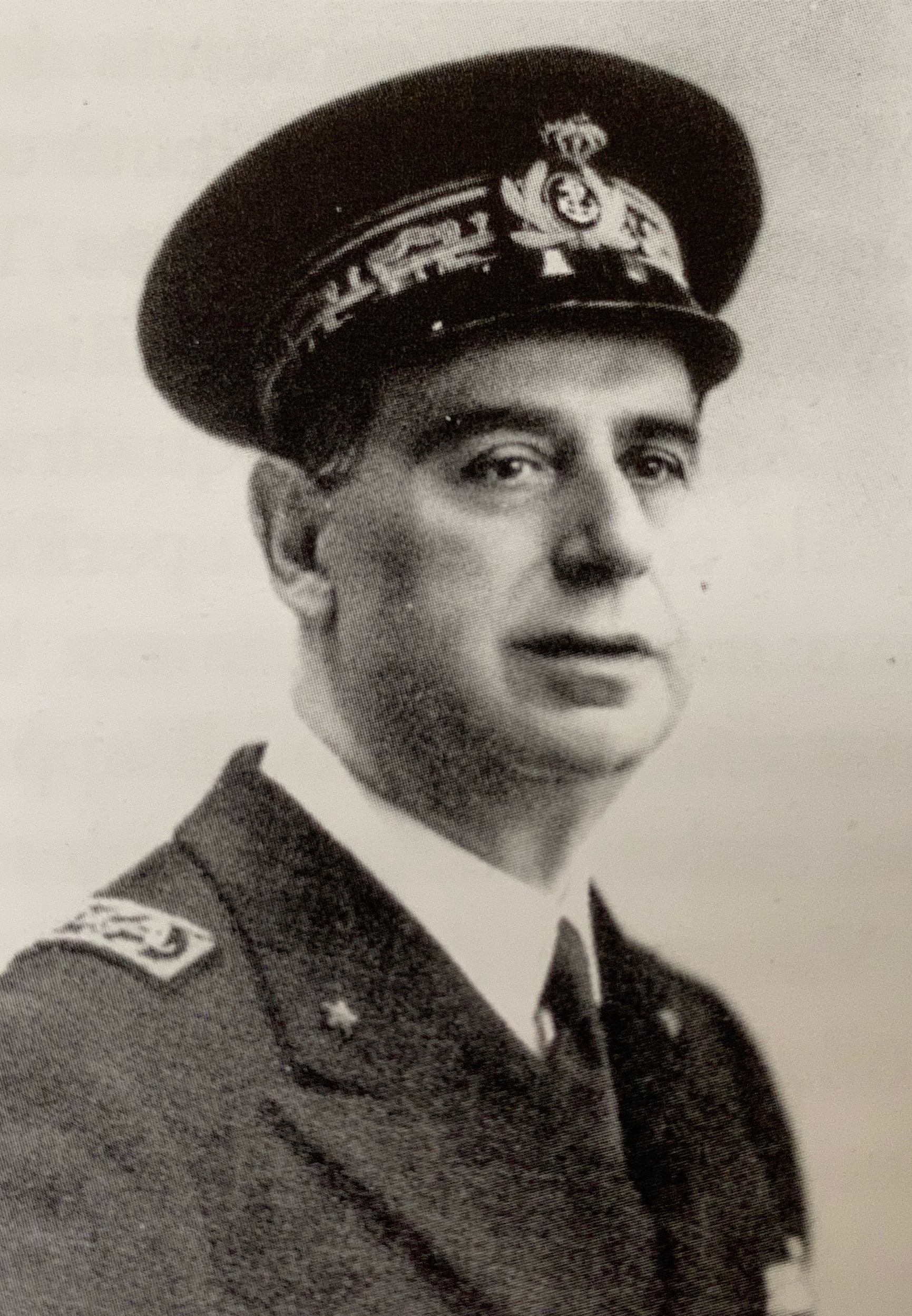
- Born: 26 October 1882; Torre del Greco, Kingdom of Italy
- Died: 25 June 1948 (aged 65); Rome, Italy
- Military career
- Allegiance: Kingdom of Italy
- Branch: Regia Marina
- Rank: Admiral
- Commands: Naval Command of Šibenik; Antoniotto Usodimare (destroyer); Luigi Cadorna (light cruiser); Duilio (battleship); Tobruk Naval Base; Dodecanese naval command 1st Cruiser Division; Sardinia Naval Command; Albania Naval Command
- Conflicts: Italo-Turkish War; Battle of Kunfuda Bay; World War I; Italian invasion of Albania; Battle of Durres; World War II
- Awards: War Cross for Military Valor; War Merit Cross; Military Order of Savoy; Order of the Crown of Italy; Order of Saints Maurice and Lazarus

Ettore Sportiello (26 October 1882 – 25 June 1948) was an Italian admiral during World War II.

== Biography ==
He was born in Torre del Greco on 26 October 1882, and entered the Naval Academy of Livorno in 1901, graduating as ensign on 17 November 1904. He was initially embarked on the battleship Emanuele Filiberto and then on the auxiliary ship Bronte. After promotion to sub-lieutenant, he served on the battleship Napoli, participating in the rescue operations after the 1908 Messina earthquake. In 1911-1912 he participated in the Italo-Turkish War aboard the protected cruiser Piemonte, stationed in the Red Sea, earning a War Cross for Military Valor. He was then promoted to lieutenant and assigned again on Napoli and then on the battleships Re Umberto and Giulio Cesare. He participated in the First World War, as a torpedo boat commander; at the end of the war he was appointed naval commander of Vis.

After promotion to lieutenant commander in 1919, he was first assigned to the Naval Command of Šibenik, then to the Arsenal of La Spezia and finally embarked on the royal yacht Trinacria. In 1925 he was promoted to commander, and in 1930-1931 he was given command of the destroyer Antoniotto Usodimare, which along with other destroyers provided support to Italo Balbo's mass transatlantic flight from Italy to Brazil.

On 12 December 1931 he was promoted to captain and given command of the C.R.E.M. barracks of Pola, and of the naval schools located there. From 28 February 1934 to 27 November 1935 he was in command of the light cruiser Luigi Cadorna, and then of the battleship Duilio till 30 March 1936; from 11 April to November 21, 1936, he commanded the Tobruk naval base.

After promotion to rear admiral on 9 November 1936, he was appointed naval commander of the Dodecanese, with headquarters in Rhodes. On 7 March 1938 he was promoted to vice admiral and given command of the 1st Cruiser Division, participating in the conquest of Albania in April 1939; in 1940 he became commander of all naval forces in Sardinia, a post he still held at the time of Italy's entry into World War II. In October 1940 he was appointed naval commander of Albania, with headquarters in Durrës, commanding naval forces during the Greco-Italian War and the invasion of Yugoslavia. For his organizational skills in the management of Albanian ports, he was formally commended by Benito Mussolini and awarded the Knight's Cross of the Military Order of Savoy.

At the end of 1941 he was promoted to admiral and appointed commander-in-chief of the Corpo Regi Equipaggi Marittimi (Corps of Royal Naval Crews), with headquarters in La Spezia. At the time of the armistice of 8 September 1943 he was in Viareggio, where his command had been transferred. Having refused to collaborate with the authorities of the Italian Social Republic, he was jailed twice. After the liberation of Viareggio, on 18 September 1944, he resumed his service and became a member of the commission for the readmission into service of officers discharged from the navy due to the 1938 racial laws. He then served as the first president of the Superior Council of the Navy before retiring from active service in 1945. He died in Rome three years later.
