= Albanian Navy (1914–1939) =

Navy of the Principality of Albania Albanian Republican Navy Royal Albanian Navy (Forcat Mbretërore e Mbrojtjës Detare Shqiptare)
- Active: Principality: 1914; Republic: 1925–1927; Kingdom: 1928–1939
- Disbanded: 1914 (principality); 1927 (republic); 1939 (kingdom)
- Country: Principality of Albania; Albanian Republic; Kingdom of Albania
- Allegiance: Royal Albanian Army
- Branch: Navy
- Type: Defence force
- Role: Coastal protection
- Size: 17 officers and 140 sailors
- Headquarter: Port of Durrës, Durrës
- Ships: 1 royal yacht and 4 patrol boats in 1939
- Engagements: 1914–1915 Muslim revolts in Albania Italian Invasion of Albania: Battle of Durrës (1939)

Insignia
- Naval Ensign between 1928 and 1934

- Naval Ensign between 1934 and 1939

Between 1914 and 1939, there were three separate Albanian navies. The first navy was short-lived, belonging to the Principality of Albania. The second one, the Albanian Republican Navy shared a similar fate, as it served the short-lived Albanian Republic. The third navy, the Royal Albanian Navy, managed to last over a decade, until Italy invaded the country. The Republican and Royal Albanian Navies together formed the Zog era of the Albanian Navy, as King Zog founded the republic with himself as President before crowning himself as King of Albania. The Albanian Flotilla, small as it was, reached its peak during the Kingdom period.

== Warships of the Principality of Albania ==
The first Albanian warship, albeit a ceremonial one, was the paddle yacht Taurus of the Austro-Hungarian government. This vessel briefly served as royal yacht, bringing the Albanian Prince William to the then-capital of Albania, the port city of Durrës, on 7 March 1914. Taurus was built in Britain in 1903 as Nirvana before being purchased by Austria-Hungary in 1909 for 25,000 Sterling pounds. She displaced 1,375 tons, measuring 67.1 meters in length. She had a top speed of 15.6 knots and was armed with four light guns (two 47 mm Hotchkiss plus two 37 mm).

The other warship of this period was the armed steamer Herzegovina. Chartered from an Austrian shipping company initially as a transport ship, this small steamer was hastily armed with a mountain gun and crewed to fight the raging uprising against Prince William. She was used to bombard the town of Kavaja several times with little effect, before being run aground into a sandbank and heavily gunned by the rebels. She was ultimately recovered by her owners, who argued than the ship was not intended for military use.

== The Zog era ==
=== Republican warships ===
In 1925, after the would-be King Zog came to power as President, the first proper warships of the Albanian Navy were acquired. Both vessels were ex-German flat-bottom minesweepers of the 205-ton type. They were named Shqipnia (ex-FM-16) and Skenderbeg (ex-FM-23) and served as gunboats. Despite comprising the entire Albanian Navy, the two warships spent their last two years of service rusting off Durrës before being sold for scrap.

=== Royal warships ===
After President Zog crowned himself King in 1928, he re-created the Albanian Navy that same year. Drawing lessons from the failed use of second-hand warships, he ordered a class of four smaller, but newly built patrol boats from Venice, Italy. Each of these vessels displaced between 40 and 46 tons, measuring 24.4 meters in length. Armament consisted of one three-inch (76 mm) naval gun and two machine guns, with a top speed amounting to 17 knots. The four boats were named after Albanian cities: Tiranë, Vlorë, Durrës and Sarandë.

Following the four patrol boats, a new royal yacht was also acquired from France. She was named Ilirja.

=== Personnel ===
At the time of the Italian invasion, the declared strength of the navy was 17 officers and about 140 petty officers and sailors. The most notable officer was the war hero Mujo Ulqinaku, commander of the patrol boat Tiranë.
