= Mujo Ulqinaku =

Albanian sergeant (1896-1939)

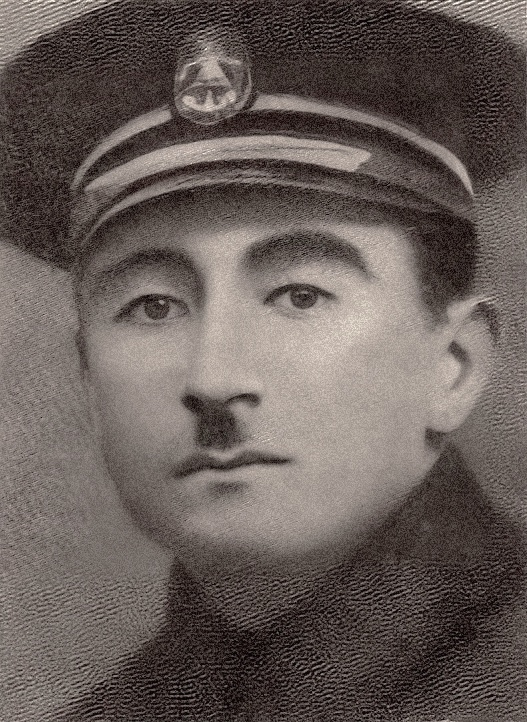
- Born: Muhamet Cakuli; 1896; Ulcinj, Principality of Montenegro
- Died: 7 April 1939 (aged 42–43); Durrës, Kingdom of Albania
- Military career
- Allegiance: Kingdom of Albania
- Branch: Royal Albanian Army; Royal Albanian Navy
- Conflicts: Italian Invasion of Albania: Battle of Durrës (1939) †
- Awards: Hero of the People; National Flag Order

Mujo Ulqinaku (born Muhamet Cakuli; 1896 – 7 April 1939) was an Albanian sergeant of the Royal Albanian Navy, known for his resistance on 7 April 1939 to the Italian forces during the Italian invasion of Albania. He was given the People's Hero of Albania award posthumously.

== Life ==
Mujo Ulqinaku was born in 1896 in Ulcinj, in the Principality of Montenegro, now modern Montenegro, to a family of merchant sailors. In his teens he joined the commercial fleet in Shkodër and Lezhë. Later he served in the Albanian navy, based in Durrës, with the rank of sergeant, commanding the patrol boat Tiranë. He was one of the few officers of the Royal Albanian Navy who tried to stop the Italian invasion of Albania. Armed only with a machine gun, he was placed in the center of the defense line where he killed and wounded dozens of Italian soldiers. He was killed by an artillery shell from an Italian torpedo boat in the last hour of the battle.

== Legacy ==
Ulqinaku is memorialized by a monument in front of Durrës Castle. A grammar school in Durrës and streets in Tirana and Pristina bear his name. A documentary on his life and actions, "Lufton Mujo Ulqinaku" (English: Mujo Ulqinaku fights on), was released in 1979 by Kinostudio Shqipëria e Re.

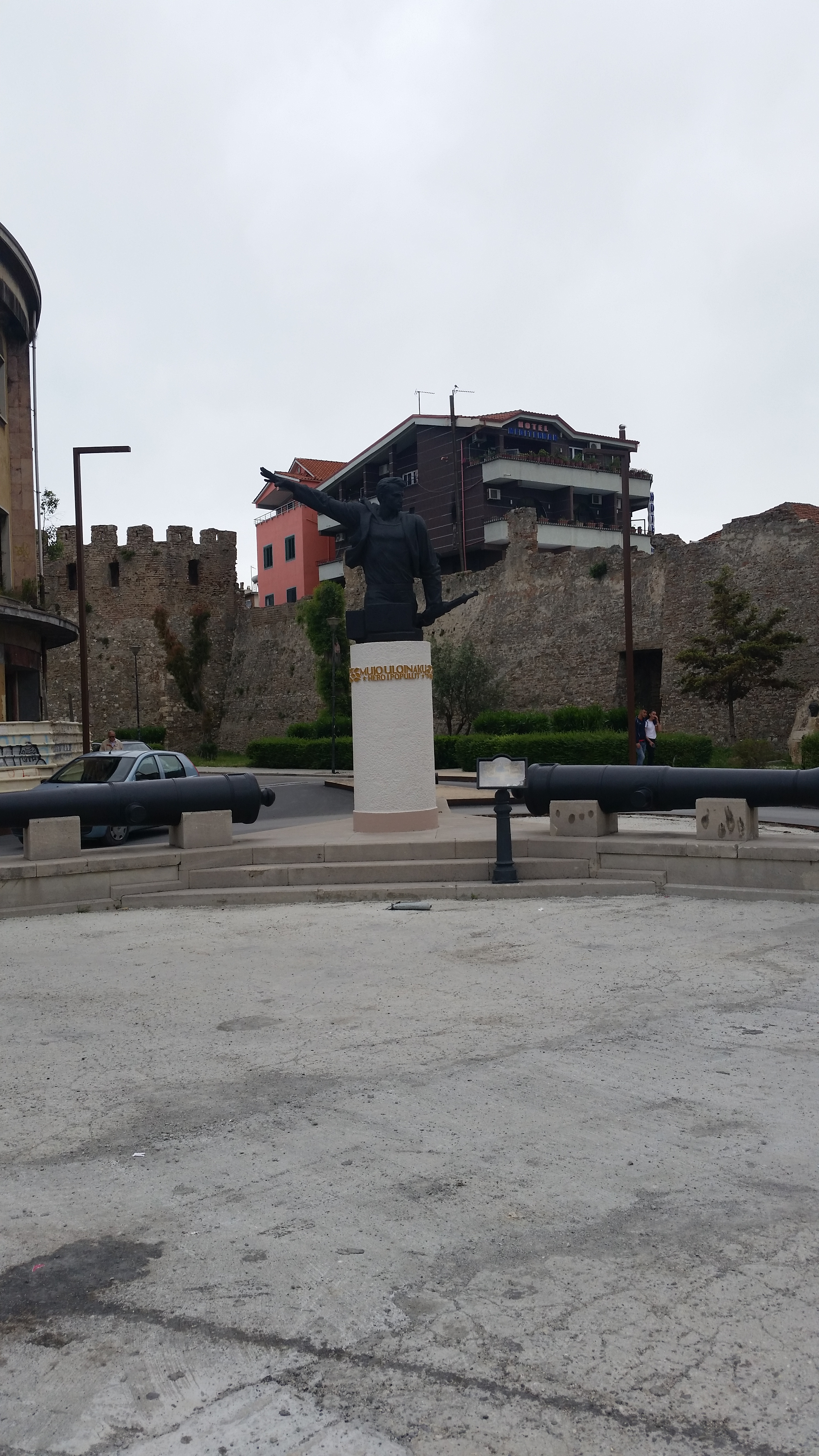
Monument dedicated to Mujo in front of the walls of Durrës in 2008.
