= International Gendarmerie =

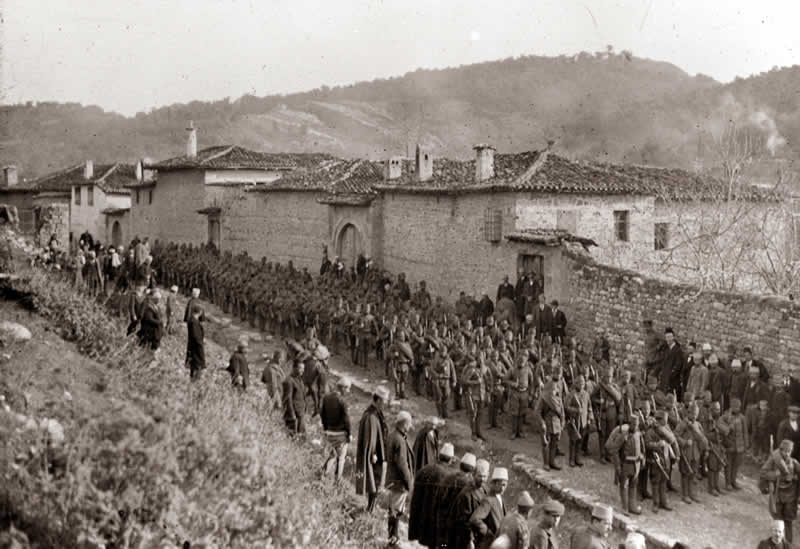
- Albanian Gendarmerie in southern Albania, 1913
- Country: Principality of Albania
- Type: Gendarmerie
- Role: Law enforcement agency

Commanders
- Colonel: Willem De Veer
- Major: Lodewijk Thomson

The International Gendarmerie was the first law enforcement agency of the Principality of Albania. It was established by the decision of the ambassadors of the six Great Powers that participated in the London Peace Conference. This decision was made on the basis of the London Treaty signed on 30 May 1913. Since most of the members were from the Netherlands, this force was also known as the Dutch Military Mission.

The first gendarmerie members arrived in Albania on 10 November 1913. They were soon faced with a peasant revolt. One International Gendarmerie officer was killed and many were imprisoned after the revolt erupted in June 1914. Dutch officers were gradually replaced by officers from Austria-Hungary and Germany, who arrived in Durrës on 4 July. Soon, World War I broke out, and by 4 August most of the Dutch officers had returned to the Netherlands. By 19 September 1914 the last two imprisoned officers were released.

== Background ==
The ambassadors of the six Great Powers decided to constitute the Principality of Albania on 29 July 1913 during the 54th meeting of the London Conference. The new country needed a sovereign, borders, government and military police force. To ensure the gendarmerie's neutrality, the Powers decided that its members should come from a different country. Their first choice was Sweden, but that country was already busy with a similar mission in Persia, they chose the Netherlands for its neutrality, lack of direct interest in Albania and extensive colonial experience in the Dutch East Indies. On 15 October 1913 they established the International Commission of Control (ICC) to administer the country until its own political institutions were established. Wilhelm of Wied was selected as the first prince.

== Leadership ==
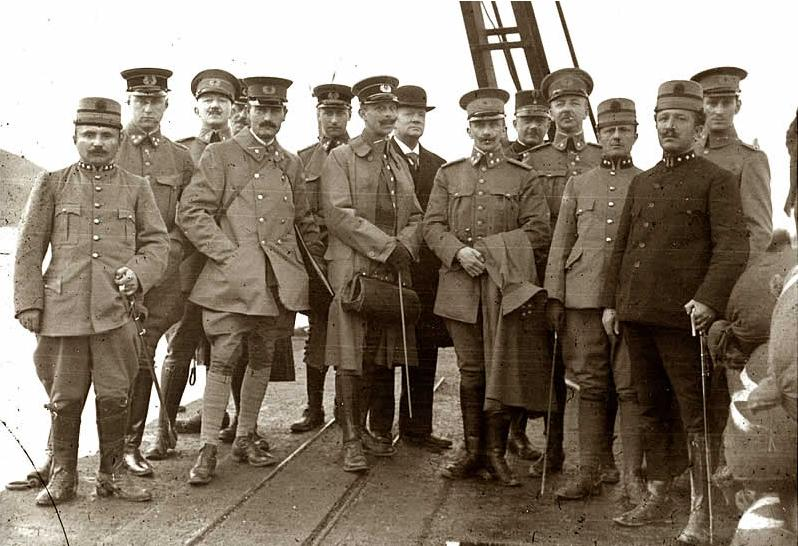
Captain Fabius, Major Kroon, Major De Waal (partly visible), Major Sluys, Captain Doorman, Major Roelfsema, Dr. De Groot (in civilian clothes), Captain Sar, Major Verhulst, Major Snellen van Vollenhoven and, far right, First Lieutenant Mallinckrodt on their arrival in Vlorë on 24 February 1914. The others are Albanian officers.

The Netherlands' War Minister initially chose Major Lodewijk Thomson to head the Gendarmerie, but after a Dutch unrelated political crisis and the formation of a new government, the new Minister appointed Colonel Willem De Veer instead, placing Thomson as his second-in-command on 20 October 1913.

De Veer and Thomson prepared a classified 150-page report on the setting up of the gendarmerie. There were discussions of 5,000 gendarmes led by Dutch officers provided by the government of the Netherlands. On 24 February 1914, 13 Dutch officers arrived at Vlorë: Captain Fabius, Major Kroon, Major De Waal, Major Sluys, Captain Doorman, Major Roelfsema, Dr. De Groot, Captain Sar, Major Verhulst, Major Snellen van Vollenhoven, First Lieutenant Mallinckrodt, Captains Reimers and Sonne.

== Mission ==
The International Gendarmerie was only one of numerous armed groups in the principality during Wilhelm's reign. Others included irregular bands of southerners led by local leaders; native outlaws; Bulgarian outlaw Komitadjis; Greek rebels from the Northern Epirus; peasant rebels in central Albania; Essad Pasha's gendarmerie; volunteers from Kosovo led by Isa Boletini; and Mirdita Catholic volunteers from the northern mountains under the command of Prênk Bibë Doda.

A plot by the Young Turk government and led by Bekir Fikri to restore Ottoman control over Albania through the installment of an Ottoman-Albanian officer Ahmed Izzet Pasha as monarch was uncovered by the Serbs and reported to the ICC. Ismail Qemali supported the plot for military assistance against Serbia and Greece. The ICC allowed their Dutch officers serving as the Albanian Gendarmerie to declare a state of emergency and stop the plot. They raided Vlorë on 7-8 January 1914, discovering more than 200 Ottoman troops and arrested Fikri. During Fikri's trial the plot emerged and an ICC military court under Colonel Willem de Veer condemned him to death and later commuted to life imprisonment, while Qemali and his cabinet resigned. After Qemali left the country, turmoil ensured throughout Albania.

One of the first tasks of the new gendarmerie was to train Albanian recruits in order to take control of southern Albania after the Northern Epirote Declaration of Independence of 28 February 1914.

Essad Pasha Toptani, as minister of war and interior, was against a peaceful solution of the problem. He opposed the International Commission of Control which believed that the problem could be solved by diplomatic means. The Prince and his cabinet accepted Essad Pasha's proposals for a military solution. Several thousand Italian rifles and Austrian machine and mountain guns were purchased and distributed to the (predominantly Muslim) population of central Albania. They believed that the new regime was a tool of the (Christian) Great Powers and the landowners that owned half of the arable land. On the basis of those beliefs they revolted.

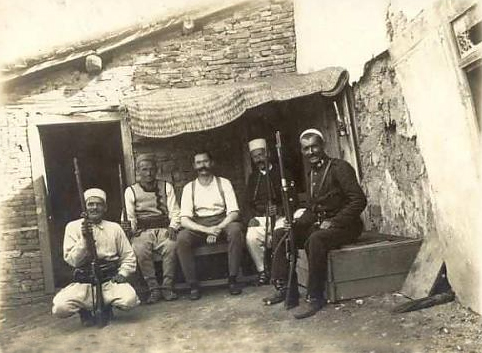
Captain Hendrik Reimers captured by the peasant rebels

When thousands of rebels surrounded Shijak on 17 May, only 10 km (6.2 mi) from Durrës, Essad Pasha was accused of fomenting the revolt against William of Wied. He was exiled to Italy on 20 May without trial.

The revolt intensified after Essad's exile. In order to gain support from the 1,000 Mirdita Catholic paid volunteers from the northern mountains, Prince of Wied appointed their leader, Prênk Bibë Doda, as foreign minister. Isa Boletini and his men, mostly from Kosovo, also joined the International Gendarmerie to fight the rebels. Dutch gendarmes together with the Mirdita attempted to capture Shijak, but when they engaged on 23 May they were surrounded and captured, along with another expedition from Durrës which attempted to release the captured gendarmes. Captain Sar did not know that the northern Catholic tribes refused to fight the rebels because General Besa was agreed when the Prince of Wied took over the throne. Rebels attacked Durrës, firing on it with light weapons. The people in Durrës panicked, and the Prince took his family to shelter in an Italian ship anchored in the bay.

During the early morning surprise attack, on 15 June 1914, Thomson was shot in the chest (despite the fact that rebels were attacking behind him) and died within a few minutes. It is probable that an Italian sniper was responsible.

Captain Fabius established a volunteer artillery unit. According to the Austrian government, the volunteers who bombarded the rebels were recruited by the Albanian Committee in Vienna. Till the end of June 1914 Dutch officers were captured by rebels in most of the central Albania. They were gradually replaced with officers from Austria-Hungary and Germany, who arrived in Durrës on 4 July. On 27 July 1914 Colonel De Veer officially tendered the officers' resignations. Soon the First World War broke out, and by 4 August most of the officers had returned home. The rebels captured Berat on 12 July and Vlore, without fight, on 21 August. The last two captured officers (Verhulst and Reimers) were released on 13 September 1914.

== End of the Mission ==
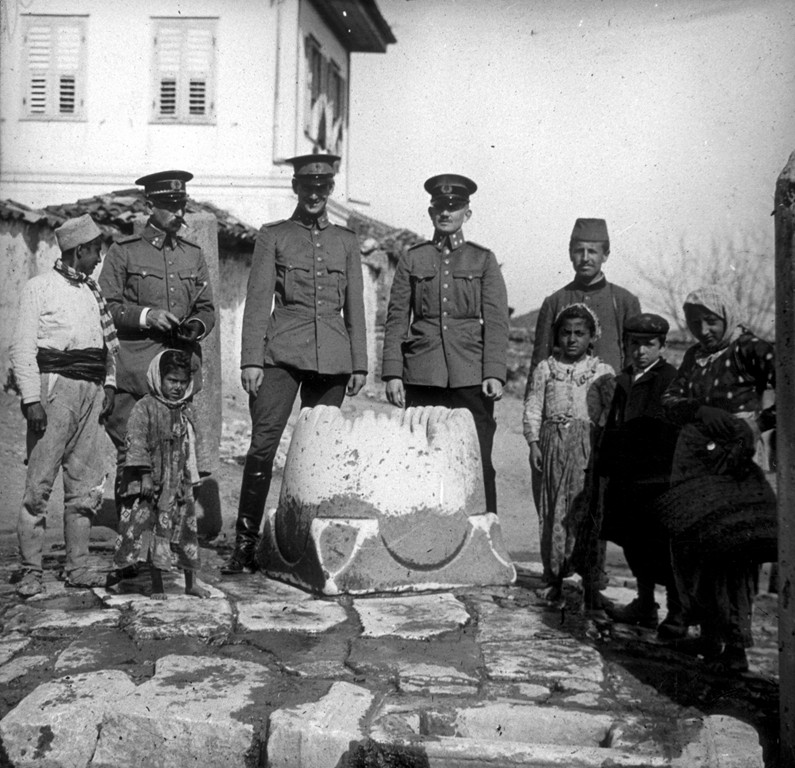
Dutch soldiers

In autumn 1914 Essad Pasha accepted an invitation from the Senate of Central Albania (established by the rebelling towns in mid and north Albania) to return to Albania to take control. His first task was to provide financial backing for his government. Therefore, he travelled to Niš, Kingdom of Serbia, where he and Serbian prime minister Pašić signed a secret treaty of Serbian-Albanian alliance on 17 September. In October 1914 Essad Pasha returned to Albania. With Italian and Serbian financial backing he established armed forces in Dibër and captured the interior and Durrës at the beginning of October, without a fight.

== See also ==
- International Commission of Control
- Lodewijk Thomson
- Peasant Revolt in Albania
- Wilhelm, Prince of Albania
