= Mustafa Ndroqi =

Albanian politician

Mustafa Ndroqi (born Mustafa Mancaku) was an Albanian landowner who played an important role in the Revolts of 1914–15.

== Background ==
The reign of Prince Wied, imposed by the Great Powers in March 1914 was filled with dissatisfaction among the Albanians. On 3 June 1914, an Islamist group of rebels founded the First General Council (Këshilli i Parë i Përgjithshëm) in Shijak. Their goal was to make Albania a protectorate of the Ottoman Empire and following Wied's expulsion, to put a Muslim king on the throne and to re-introduce the Arabic alphabet. The leader of the council was Mustafa Ndroqi, the vice president was Xhenabi Adili and Qamil Musa Haxhi Feza was appointed general military commander of the uprising. Feza quickly went into action and soon thereafter a series of uprisings took place in Krujë, Kavajë and Peqin. The uprisings extended throughout Albania, forcing Wied to retreat to Durrës.

After Wied fled the country on September 3, the insurgents felt the time was ripe to consolidate their role in governance. First, Feza became head of the Administrative Committee that was organized, and on September 11, Ndroqi established the government of the insurgents. However, on October 5, Essad Pasha headed to Tirana as the head of a private army, formed a new government and made Ndroqi vice president.
