= 1914–1915 Muslim revolts in Albania =

Uprisings in Albania

- Part of the collapse of the Principality of Albania
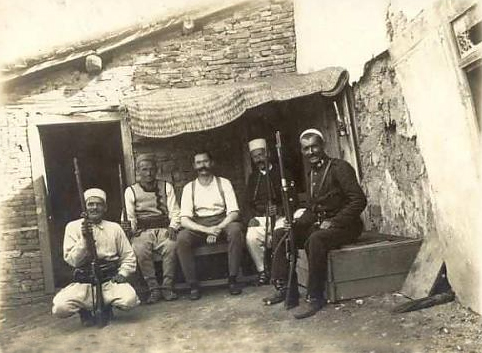
- Hendrik Reimers, Dutch captain of the International Gendarmerie, captured by rebels (June 1914)
Date	First revolt: May – 7 September 1914; Second revolt: November 1914 – June 1915
Location	Principality of Albania
Result	First revolt: Rebel victory and establishment of the Senate of Central Albania; Second revolt: Rebel defeat

Belligerents
First revolt: Ehli Kijam; Supported by: Ottoman Empire	First revolt: Principality of Albania; ICC; Catholic Albanian tribes Supported by: Austro-Hungarian Empire; Kingdom of the Netherlands
Second revolt: Union of Krujë	Second revolt: Senate of Central Albania; Kingdom of Serbia

Commanders and leaders
First revolt: Haxhi Qamili; Arif Hiqmeti; Musa Qazimi; Mustafa Ndroqi	First revolt: Vilhelm I Lodewijk Thomson †; Prênk Bibë Doda; Isa Boletini
Second revolt: Haxhi Qamili (executed); Musa Qazimi (executed); Llazar Bozo	Second revolt: Essad Toptani

Units involved
Rebel units	First revolt: International Gendarmerie; Volunteers from Kosovo; Mirdita Catholic volunteers; Romanian volunteers; Austro-Hungarian volunteers; Albanian Navy (armed steamer Herzegovina); Second revolt: Unknown; Royal Serbian Army

Casualties and losses
800+ killed, wounded or missing	First revolt: Unknown, at least one International Gendarmerie commander (Lodewijk Thomson); Second revolt: Unknown; Unknown

During the collapse of the Principality of Albania that began in 1914, there were two pro-Ottoman revolts by Albanian Muslim insurgents.

The first revolt was the Peasant Revolt, also known as the Central Albania Uprising (Albanian: Kryengritja e Shqipërisë së Mesme), which was an uprising of peasants from central Albania against the regime of Wilhelm, Prince of Albania from May to September 1914. It was one of the reasons for the prince's withdrawal from the country which marked the fall of the Principality of Albania. The uprising was led by Haxhi Qamili, Arif Hiqmeti, Musa Qazimi and Mustafa Ndroqi. Along with a demand of total amnesty, the rebels sought the return of Albania to the suzerainty of the Sultan of the Ottoman Empire. The rebellion was only tacitly supported by the Ottomans, who as a consequence of the Balkan Wars, were physically separated from the Albanian lands. The Ottoman preoccupation with the looming First World War also rendered diplomatic and material support impractical. Ultimately, the rebels achieved victory with Prince Wilhelm's departure and consolidated control over central Albania, establishing a new regime known as the Senate of Central Albania.

The second revolt began in Krujë in November 1914, after the Ottoman Empire's declaration of war and declaration of jihad against the Entente, which pitted the pro-Ottoman masses against Essad Toptani, the leader of the Senate of Central Albania. The revolt was led by a group called the "Union of Krujë". Despite their initial successes, an intervention by Toptani's ally Serbia led to the crushing of the revolt in June 1915.

== Background ==
=== Failed pro-Ottoman plot ===
A plot by the Young Turk government led by Bekir Fikri to restore Ottoman control over Albania through the installment of an Ottoman-Albanian officer, Ahmed Izzet Pasha, as monarch was uncovered by the Serbs and reported to the ICC. Ismail Qemali supported the plot for military assistance against Serbia and Greece. The ICC allowed their Dutch officers serving as the Albanian Gendarmerie to declare a state of emergency and stop the plot. They raided Vlorë discovering more than 200 Ottoman troops and arrested Fikri. During Fikri's trial, the plot emerged and an ICC military court under Colonel Willem de Veer condemned him to death. His sentence was later commuted to life imprisonment, while Qemali and his cabinet resigned. After Qemali left the country, turmoil ensued throughout Albania.

=== Wilhem arrives in Albania ===
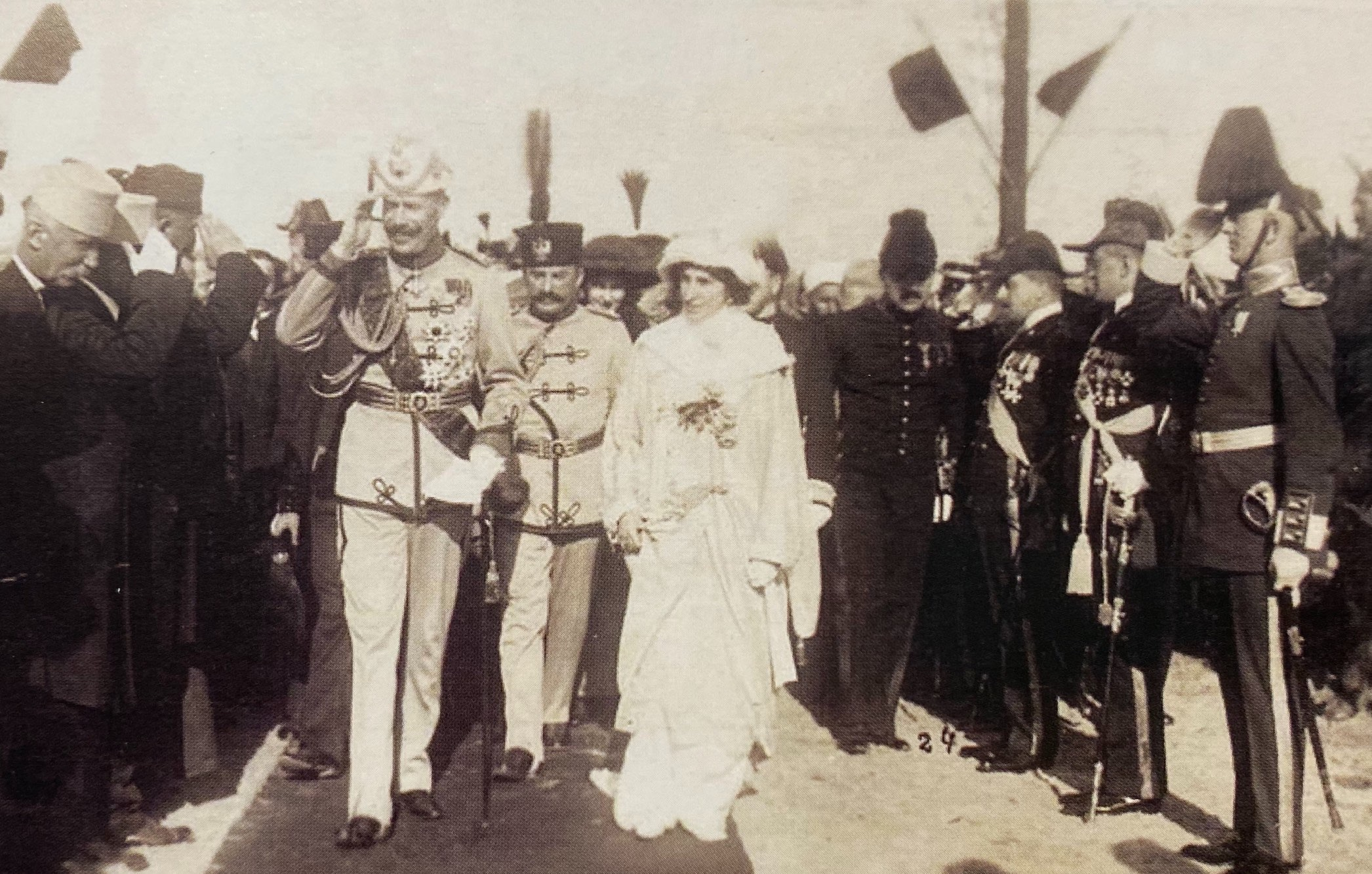
Prince William and his wife Sophie arriving in Albania on March 7, 1914

Based on the Treaty of London signed on May 30, 1913, the Great Powers resolved on July 29, 1913 that they should establish International gendarmerie to take care of public order and security on the territory of newly recognized Principality of Albania. On the same basis, they established the International Commission of Control (ICC) on October 15, 1913, to take care of the administration of newly established Albania until its own political institutions were in order.

Prince Wilhelm took the throne of the Principality of Albania on March 7, 1914. Unfortunately, he immediately had to face a chaotic political situation, both within the country and with its neighbors.

Prince Wilhelm had to handle a difficult political situation:

1. Essad Pasha Toptani, who dominated the new government of the Principality of Albania, was both minister of interior and minister of war. By choosing to reside in Durrës, instead of Shkodër, Prince Wilhelm was at the mercy of Essad Pasha.
2. The International Commission of Control and foreign advisers still had a great deal of authority.
3. There were representatives of both Austria-Hungary and Italy
4. There was resistance in Northern Epirus, which was finally given a special administration, by Protocol of Corfu
5. There was fighting between forces under control of Essad Pasha Toptani and the Provisional Government of Albania
6. The major peasant revolt consisted mostly of pro-Ottoman Muslim peasants.

There were numerous armed groups in Principality of Albania during the regime of Prince Wilhelm:

1. The International Gendarmerie was under the control of the International Commission of Control and Prince Wilhelm.
2. The irregular bands of southerners were led by local leaders.
3. The native outlaw
4. The Bulgarian outlaws, Komitadjis
5. The Greek rebels from the Northern Epirus
6. The peasant rebels in central Albania
7. Essad Pasha's gendarmerie
8. The Romanian volunteers
9. The Austro-Hungarian volunteers
10. The volunteers from Kosovo led by Isa Boletini
11. The Mirdita Catholic volunteers from the northern mountains under the command of Prênk Bibë Doda

Essad Pasha Toptani, as Minister of War and Interior, was against a peaceful solution to the problem with the Northern Epirote Declaration of Independence on February 28, 1914. Toptani opposed the International Commission of Control which believed that problems can be solved by diplomatic means. The prince and his cabinet accepted the proposals of Essad Pasha to decide for a military solution. In order to increase the military strength of the Principality of Albania, several thousand Italian rifles as well as Austrian machine guns and mountain guns were purchased and distributed to the (predominantly Muslim) population of the central Albania.

== First revolt (Peasant Revolt) ==
=== Events ===
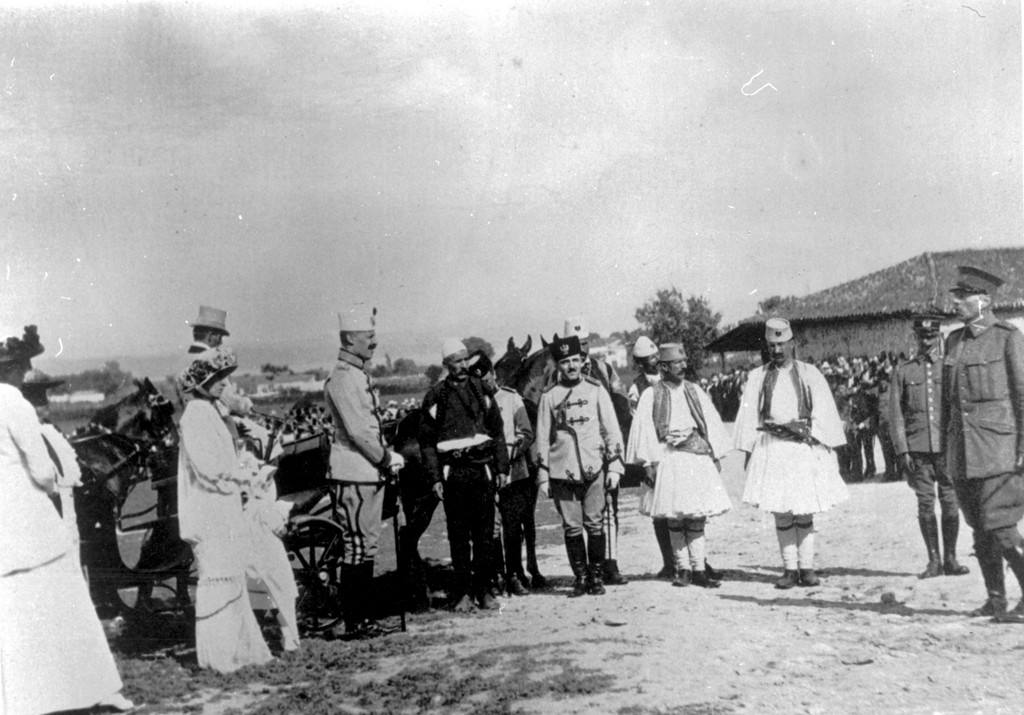
Wilhelm, Prince of Albania, Isa Boletini and officers of the International Gendarmerie: Duncan Heaton-Armstrong and Colonel Thomson near Durrës in June 1914

Prince Wilhelm's arrival in Albania had caused immediate anger and unrest among the Muslims of central Albania, who were influenced by Ottoman propaganda which portrayed the new regime as a tool of the Christian powers and the large landowners that owned half of the arable land. By early May 1914, the discontent had evolved into a general revolt led by Haxhi Qamili, Arif Hiqmeti, Musa Qazimi and Mustafa Ndroqi. The aim of the rebels was to restore Ottoman rule over Albania, and they violently rejected Albanian nationalism and secularism. The preferred method of organization of the rebels was the formation of local councils for directing and expanding the rebellion.

There are differing accounts as to the exact nature of Essad Toptani's involvement in the uprising. Some sources indicate that he had a leading role in the uprising from the beginning, yet others describe the rebels as explicitly anti-Toptani. In any case, and regardless of whether he actually enjoyed widespread support among the rebels, Toptani wanted to take advantage of the chaos to oust Prince Wilhelm and seize power for himself, and was backed by Italy, which viewed Wilhelm as too pro-Austrian.Dutch officers led by Lodewijk Thomson who were stationed in Albania as part of the ICC ultimately decided to have Toptani arrested, despite Wilhelm remaining indecisive on the matter. On 19 May, Toptani's house was raided by government forces and he surrendered; the following day he was exiled to Italy. In Italy, he was received with honor, since both Italian and Austrian representatives played roles in intrigues that surrounded the revolt.

The chaos and revolts deteriorated after Essad Pasha was exiled. In order to gain support of the Mirdita Catholic volunteers from the northern mountains, Prince Wilhelm appointed their leader, Prênk Bibë Doda, to be the foreign minister of the Principality of Albania. The International Dutch Gendarmerie was also joined by Isa Boletini and his men from Kosovo. Dutch gendarmes, together with northern Mirdita Catholics, attempted to capture Shijak, but when they engaged the rebels on May 23, they were surrounded and captured. It also happened to another expedition from Durrës which attempted to release the captured gendarmes. Rebels launched the attack on Durrës and even started firing with their light weapons. The people in Durrës panicked and the Prince and his family had to find shelter on an Italian ship anchored in the bay.

On the same evening, the rebels released a Dutch officer and sent him to Prince Wilhelm with their demands:

- Total amnesty
- Return of Albania under suzerainty of sultan of Ottoman Empire

On 3 June, the first central political body of the Muslim insurgency, the "General Council", was elected following an assembly of councils at Shijak. By now, while there appeared to be factions who were in favor of Toptani and factions who were opposed to him, they had all firmly united in order to reach their common goal of ousting Prince Wilhelm.

Prince Wilhelm then appointed, Colonel Thomson, to be commander of defense of Durrës. Thomson was killed on June 15 during a rebel attack. The next week, Dutch officers were captured by rebels in central Albania. The rebels captured Berat and Vlore on July 12 and August 21 without a fight.

On August 14, the rebels attacked the capital, which was protected mainly by Romanian and Austrian volunteers. The first attack lasted 30 minutes and was repulsed with heavy losses. The second attack began after an hour before it was once again repulsed, mainly due to the brave actions of the Romanians who were greatly praised by their Christian Albanian comrades. After 30 minutes, the insurgents launched their third and final attack, but they were repelled by stiff Romanian resistance.

Once World War I broke out, the attention of the Great Powers quickly turned towards this new European war and away from the chaos in Albania. The Austro-Hungarians and Germans began leaving the besieged Durrës on 2 August 1914. This was followed by the departure of the Dutch two days later. The ICC's multinational force left the country on 23 August. Nonetheless, Austria-Hungary demanded that Prince Wilhelm send Albanian troops to fight with the Central Powers. When Wilhelm refused, stating that the Treaty of London had required Albania to remain neutral, his remuneration was cut off.

On 1 September 1914, the Muslim insurgents notified the ICC that they demanded that Wilhelm leave Albania or they would begin a renewed bombardment of Durrës until it surrendered. Under overwhelming pressure, Wilhelm finally decided it would indeed be best to leave the country, departing on 3 September 1914 on the same Italian yacht that he had briefly fled to earlier in May after the battle at Shijak. He issued a proclamation to the Albanian people that "he deemed it necessary to absent himself temporarily", and went on to join the Imperial German Army on the eastern front. The ICC briefly assumed full control of the Albanian government before disbanding itself on 6 September. The next day, Durrës finally fell to the Muslim rebels. With these events, remaining central authority crumbled and any sense of national unity in Albania evaporated.

=== Reactions ===
The revolt failed to generate much support in the regions surrounding Elbasan, which were inhabited by a mix of Sunni, Bektashi, and Orthodox Albanians, with the Sunnis being the most numerous. The local Muslims were noted for their opposition to ideas deemed "fanatical" and their identification with Albanian nationalism. Much of this is attributed to the charismatic leadership of the Albanian nationalist Aqif Pasha. Local Islamic leaders also denounced the "archaic" ideas of Haxhi Qamili and supported the adoption of the Latin alphabet, contradicting much of the Sunni clergy elsewhere. The representative of Elbasan in Haxhi Qamili's uprising, Haxhi Feza, withdrew from the movement in protest against Haxhi Qamili's excesses, and for this, Haxhi Qamili personally ordered him to be imprisoned.

In the fight for Pogradec, the rebels killed Gani Butka, the son of Sali Butka. Seeing their chance, Greek forces overran the regions of Permet, Korçë and Tepelena, and the Greek "North Epirotes" met with Qamili in Pogradec, where they reached an agreement to fight their mutual enemies.

=== Atrocities ===
During the revolt, the "disciplinary forces" of rebels headed by the mufti of Tirana, Musa Qazimi, carried out executions in order to "clean" the "Bektashi schismatics". The rebels, led by the fanatic Haxhi Qamili, burned down many Bektashi teqes from Martanesh in Bulqizë as far south as Berat, due to the strong links between Bektashism and Albanian nationalism and the religious differences between the Shi'ite-oriented Bektashis and the Sunni Muslim rebels.

Other targets besides "Bektashi schismatics" included Christians, Albanian nationalist teachers who had been teaching using the Latin alphabet, and even Muslim clerics who were supporters of Albanian nationhood. Haxhi Qamili and his supporters were reported to have bound, tortured and killed many teachers of the Albanian language. Because Qamili supported the usage of the Arabic alphabet (as opposed to the Latin one), he viewed them as enemies of the Ottoman Empire.

=== Aftermath ===
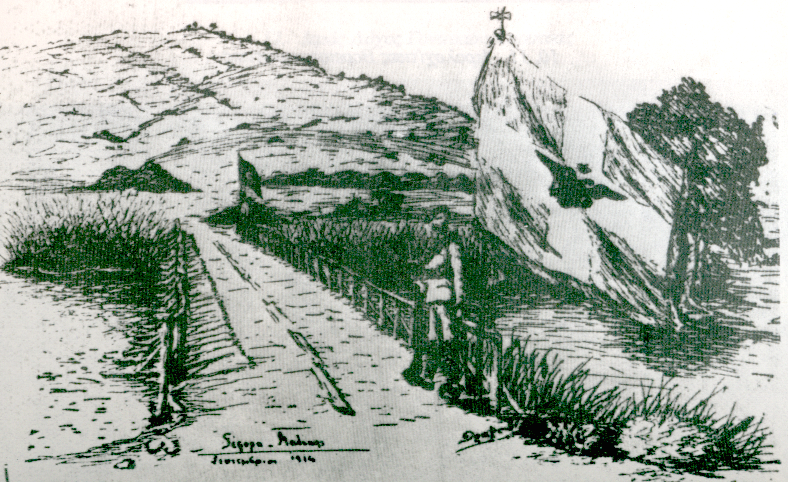
Border crossing between the area controlled by the Senate of Central Albania (left) and the Autonomous Republic of Northern Epirus (right), in lake Maliq, September 1914.

The "Senate of Central Albania" was the polity that was formed by the Muslim insurgents after their capture of Durrës on 7 September 1914. Inside the city, the victorious rebels hoisted the Ottoman flag, began imprisoning supporters of Wilhelm, and declared that they would seek to install a Muslim prince. Prince Şehzade Mehmed Burhaneddin, a son of the former Ottoman sultan Abdul Hamid II, was invited to take up this position, but this proposal never materialized. The vast majority of population living in the northern and the southern part of Albania disassociated themselves from the Senate of Central Albania.

The Senate apparently dropped its plans for a "Muslim prince" and invited Toptani to return to Albania and take over as leader. Toptani had been in France when World War I broke out and immediately left for Albania, seeking to take power and align Albania with the Entente Powers. Along the way, he stopped at Serbia and signed the Treaty of Niš with the Serbian prime minister Nikola Pašić on 17 September. The treaty envisioned a Serb-Albanian alliance that would be implemented with Toptani returning to Albania and being elected as leader. On 19 September, with full Serbian support, Toptani returned to Albania. He went to the Dibër region, where he gathered a force of 4,000 volunteers, and peacefully entered Durrës at the beginning of October 1914. On 5 October, with the backing of the Senate, Toptani proclaimed himself as prime minister and president, setting up the Toptani Government, considered the 3rd ruling government of Albania. Immediately afterwards, he declared war on Austria-Hungary to show he was on the side of the Entente.

Toptani was aware that the vast majority of the population governed by the Senate of Central Albania remained pro-Ottoman (the Ottoman Empire was neutral at this point in the war). Therefore, he did not question the Senate's pro-Ottoman policy nor its nominal declaration that the Ottoman sultan (Mehmed V) had suzerainty over Albania.

== Second revolt ==
=== Events ===
Albanian troops of Essad Toptani

The Ottoman Empire declared war against the Entente on 31 October 1914. This shattered Toptani's balance between his pro-Entente administration and his overtures to the pro-Ottoman majority of Central Albania. Emboldened especially by the Ottoman declaration of jihad against the Entente (14 November), a Muslim revolt occurred once more, this time starting from the Krujë area. These rebels were extremely anti-Serbian and influenced by Ottoman propaganda which branded Toptani as a traitor to Islam and called for the reconquest of Kosovo from Serbia. On 20 December, an assembly of rebel delegates formed a body called the "Union of Krujë" to direct the uprising. Haxhi Qamili returned to become one of the commanders of this new revolt.

The Central Powers actively supported the rebels, with Ottoman officers arriving in the region to command rebel forces, and Austria-Hungary regularly supplying the rebels with money, weapons, and ammunition. The Krujë rebels also began conducting cross-border raids into Serbia alongside Bulgarian irregulars. In May 1915, Qamili was elected as leader of the rebels, marking his second time leading a pro-Ottoman revolt in Albania.

After months of delay, Serbia finally sent forces to Albania to intervene on behalf of Toptani in June 1915, and were able to crush the rebels. Qamili and other rebel leaders were imprisoned and hanged in Durrës.

=== Aftermath ===
Later in October 1915, the forces of the Central Powers overran Serbia and invaded Albania, with Toptani going into permanent exile in February 1916. Entente forces, mostly those of Italy, would manage to push the Central Powers out of Albania by the end of the war in November 1918 with Italy establishing its protectorate in Albania.
