= Battle of Durrës (1939) =

Battle of the Italian invasion of Albania in WWII

- Part of the Italian invasion of Albania
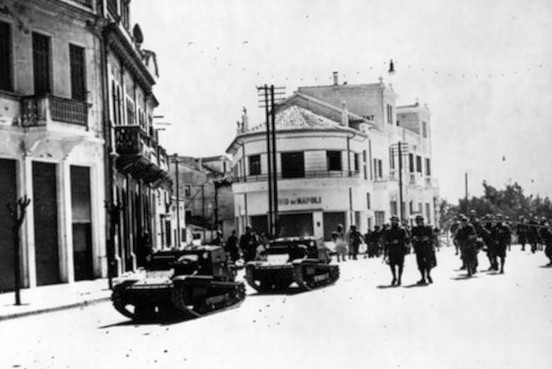
- Column of Italian soldiers in Durrës
| Date | 7 April 1939 |
| Location | Durrës, Albania |
| Result | Italian victory |
| Territorial changes | Italian occupation of Durrës and surroundings |

Belligerents
| Italy | Albania |

Commanders and leaders
| (Kingdom of Italy) Alfredo Guzzoni (Kingdom of Italy) Giovanni Messe (Kingdom of Italy) Ettore Sportiello (Kingdom of Italy) Umberto Bardelli | (Albanian Kingdom (1928–1939)) Abaz Kupi (Albanian Kingdom (1928–1939)) Mujo Ulqinaku † |

Strength
| 4,700 troops 4 cruisers 4 destroyers 4 torpedo boats 10 transport and auxiliary ships | 500 troops 4 patrol boats 1 coastal battery |

Casualties and losses
| 25 killed and 97 wounded, 400 casualties (Albanian claim) | 51 killed 4 patrol boats captured 1 coastal battery captured |

The Battle of Durrës was one of the main confrontations during the April 1939 Italian invasion of Albania. It took place on 7 April, the first day of the invasion, between the Italian invaders and the Albanian defenders and resulted in an Italian victory.

== Opposing forces ==
The Italian Armed Forces committed 22,000 troops under General Alfredo Guzzoni to the invasion of Albania. The main force, tasked with capturing the capital Tirana, was placed under the command of General Alfredo Guzzoni and was to be landed at Durrës; it consisted of two battalions of the 3rd Regiment "Granatieri di Sardegna", one battalion of the 47th Infantry Regiment "Ferrara", five Bersaglieri battalions (two belonging to the 2nd Bersaglieri Regiment and one each from the 3rd Bersaglieri Regiment, 7th Bersaglieri Regiment, and 11th Bersaglieri Regiment), the VIII and X tank battalions L of the 4th Tank Infantry Regiment with L3/35 tankettes, one 65/17 mm battery and one 20/65 anti-aircraft battery, all under the command of General Giovanni Messe. The force, numbering about 4,700 men, was carried by ten transport ships (the requisitioned merchants Adriatico, Argentario, Barletta, Palatino, Toscana and Valsavoia, the repair ship Quarnaro, the seaplane carrier Giuseppe Miraglia, used in this instance to carry tankettes, and the tankers Adige and Tirso, that could also operate as landing ships), and the landing was supported by a naval force commanded by Admiral Ettore Sportiello and consisting of the heavy cruisers Zara, Pola, Fiume, and Gorizia, the destroyers Alfieri, Oriani, Gioberti, and Carducci, and the torpedo boats Lupo, Lince, Libra and Lira.

The Albanian defenders consisted of one Frontier Guard battalion, one Albanian Army battalion, a platoon of marines of the Royal Albanian Navy, and Engineer company, a mountain battery with two 75/13 mm guns (overall, 360 soldiers and 140 marines according to Albanian sources) as well as numerous volunteers armed only with small arms. The defenders were led by the commander of the Durrës Gendarmerie, Major Abaz Kupi, and Major Alibali of the Albanian Army. The "Prandaj" coastal battery (commanded by Major Gaqe Jorgo), armed with four 75/27 mm Škoda guns, supported the defenders, whose main armament otherwise consisted of rifles and three Schwarzlose machine guns. The four patrol boats which made up the Royal Albanian Navy were armed mainly with one 76 mm gun apiece when they were commissioned in 1926. However, at the time of the Italian invasion, their armament was reduced to one obsolete machine gun, as their main guns were landed to form a coastal battery on a nearby hill, overlooking Durrës.

== Battle ==
The Italian warships arrived near Durrës in the afternoon of 6 April, whereas the transports carrying the landing forces arrived at 4:50 in the morning of April 7, with a 30-minute delay caused by the fog. Before the attack, a boat with twenty Italian officers was sent ashore, but the Albanians refused to grant them passage. An exchange of fire followed, and thus the battle ensued; the landing of the Italian force commenced at 5:25. Italian marines and troops disembarked and advanced in close formation, not expecting any resistance, as the town was illuminated and there seemed to be no sign of reaction. However, when the troops disembarked on the piers they were greeted by a barrage of rifle and machine gun fire by the defenders, lying in wait among the nearby harbour buildings, causing many casualties. A second Italian landing was carried out soon afterwards, with a greater number of troops. The Albanian defenders, however, took positions closer to the concrete breakwater of the harbor and waited for all Italians to disembark, then again opened fire with the machine guns. The third attack was successful, being supported by naval gunfire from the Italian warships; overall, fighting went on for a few hours, including in some cases hand-to-hand combat, and in the end the Albanian defenders began to fall back. By nine o'clock in the morning, all of Durrës was in Italian hands, after the Italians landed numerous small tanks and armored cars from one of their warships. The Albanian coastal battery was also active during the battle, shelling Italian positions. In the last hour of the battle, naval sergeant Mujo Ulqinaku, one of the three Albanian machine gunners, was killed by a shell from an Italian warship.

== Aftermath ==
The Albanians lost 51 men in the battle; Italian casualties are recorded as 25 killed and 97 wounded, although the Albanian side claims that Italian casualties were higher (up to 400 according to some claims). The four patrol boats of the Royal Albanian Navy were captured by the Italians, as was the coastal battery. The fighting in Durrës saw the heaviest resistance encountered by any of the Italian landing forces in Albania. From Durrës, the Italian force marched towards Tirana, that was captured on the following day.
