= Italian invasion of Albania =

1939 pre-WWII Italian invasion of Albania

- Part of the prelude to World War II
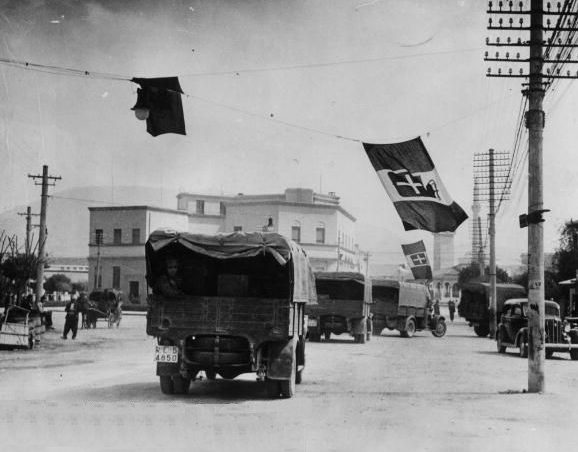
- Column of Italian forces in Albania
Date	7–12 April 1939 (5 days)
Location	Albanian Kingdom
Result	Italian victory; Albania becomes an Italian protectorate; King Zog I flees to Greece; Albanian resistance begins

Belligerents
Italy	Albania

Commanders and leaders
(Kingdom of Italy) Benito Mussolini (Kingdom of Italy) Alfredo Guzzoni (Kingdom of Italy) Giovanni Messe (Kingdom of Italy) Ettore Sportiello	(Albanian Kingdom (1928–1939)) Zog I (Albanian Kingdom (1928–1939)) Xhemal Aranitasi (Albanian Kingdom (1928–1939)) Abaz Kupi (Albanian Kingdom (1928–1939)) Mujo Ulqinaku †

Strength
22,000 soldiers 400 aircraft 2 battleships 3 heavy cruisers 3 light cruisers 9 destroyers 14 torpedo boats 1 minelayer 10 auxiliary ships 9 transport ships	8,000 soldiers 5 aircraft 3 torpedo boats

Casualties and losses
Possibly 700 killed (according to Fischer); 12–25 killed (Italian claim); 97 wounded	700+ killed (according to Fischer); 160 killed and several hundreds wounded (according to Pearson); 5 aircraft 3 torpedo boats

The Italian invasion of Albania was a brief military campaign which was launched by Italy against Albania in 1939. The conflict was a result of the imperialistic policies of the Italian prime minister and dictator Benito Mussolini. Albania was rapidly occupied, its ruler King Zog I went into exile in the neighboring Kingdom of Greece, and the country was made a part of the Italian Empire as a protectorate in personal union with the Italian Crown.

== Background ==
Albania had long been of considerable importance to the Kingdom of Italy. Italian naval strategists coveted the port of Vlorë and the island of Sazan because of their location at the entrance to the Bay of Vlorë and out to the Adriatic Sea. The Italians also wanted to construct a suitable base on Vlorë and Sazan for military operations in the Balkans. In the late Ottoman period, with a local weakening of Islam, the Albanian nationalist movement gained the strong support of the two Adriatic sea powers of Austria-Hungary and Italy, which were concerned about pan-Slavism in the wider Balkans and also Anglo-French hegemony, purportedly represented in the area through Greece. Before World War I Italy and Austria-Hungary had been supportive of the creation of an independent Albanian state. At the outbreak of the war, Italy seized the chance to occupy the southern half of Albania, to avoid it being captured by the Austro-Hungarians. That success did not last long, as Albanian resistance during the subsequent Vlora War and post-war domestic problems forced Italy to pull out in 1920. The desire to compensate for this failure would be one of Mussolini's major motives in invading Albania.

Culturally and historically, Albania was important to the nationalistic aims of Italian Fascists, as the territory of Albania had long been part of the Roman Empire, even prior to the annexation of northern Italy by the Romans. Later, during the High Middle Ages, some coastal areas (like Durazzo) had been influenced and owned by Italian powers for many years. Chief among them were the Kingdom of Naples and the Republic of Venice (cf. Albania Veneta). The Italian Fascist regime legitimized its claim to Albania by conducting studies and using them to proclaim the racial affinity of Albanians and Italians, especially as opposed to the Slavic Yugoslavs. Italian Fascists claimed that Albanians were linked to Italians through an ethnic heritage due to links between the protohistoric Italic and Illyrian populations, and they also claimed that the major influence over Albania of the Roman and Venetian empires justified Italy's right to possess it.

After Mussolini had seized power in Italy (October 1922), he turned to Albania with renewed interest. Italy began to penetrate Albania's economy in 1925, when Albania agreed to allow Italy to exploit its mineral resources. That action was followed by the signing of the First Treaty of Tirana in 1926 and the signing of the Second Treaty of Tirana in 1927, which enabled Italy and Albania to form a defensive alliance. Among other things, the Albanian government and economy were subsidised by Italian loans and the Royal Albanian Army was not only trained by Italian military instructors, most of the officers in the army were also Italians; other Italians were highly placed in the Albanian government. A third of Albanian imports came from Italy.

Despite strong Italian influence, King Zog I refused to completely give in to Italian pressure. In 1931, he openly stood up to the Italians, refusing to renew the 1926 Treaty of Tirana. After Albania signed trade agreements with Yugoslavia and Greece in 1934, Mussolini made a failed attempt to intimidate the Albanians by sending a fleet of warships to Albania.

As Nazi Germany annexed Austria and moved against Czechoslovakia, Italy noticed that it was becoming the lesser member of the Pact of Steel. Meanwhile, the imminent birth of an Albanian royal child threatened to give Zog the opportunity to establish a lasting dynasty. After Hitler invaded Czechoslovakia (15 March 1939) without notifying Mussolini in advance, the Italian dictator decided to proceed with his annexation of Albania. Italy's King Victor Emmanuel III criticized Mussolini's plan to annex Albania by stating that it was an extremely unnecessary risk for an almost negligible gain. Rome, however, delivered Tirana an ultimatum on 25 March 1939, demanding that it consent to Italy's occupation of Albania. Zog refused to accept money in exchange for allowing a full Italian takeover and colonization of Albania.

The Albanian government tried to keep news of the Italian ultimatum secret. While Radio Tirana persistently broadcast claims in which it stated that nothing was happening, people became suspicious; and the news of the Italian ultimatum was spread by unofficial sources. On 5 April the king's son was born and the news of his birth was announced by the firing of cannons. Alarmed, people poured out into the streets, but the news of the birth of the new prince calmed them. People suspected that something else was going on, which led to an anti-Italian demonstration in Tirana the same day. On 6 April, several demonstrations were staged in Albania's main cities. That same afternoon, 100 Italian aircraft flew over Tirana, Durrës, and Vlorë, dropping leaflets which instructed the people to submit to Italian occupation. The people were infuriated by this demonstration of force and they called for the government to resist the Italian occupation and release all of the Albanians who were previously arrested on the suspicion that they were "communists". The crowd shouted, "Give us arms! We are being sold out! We are being betrayed!". While a mobilization of the reserves was called, many high-ranking officers left the country. The government began to dissolve. The Minister of the Interior, Musa Juka, left the country and moved to Yugoslavia the same day. While King Zog announced that he would resist the Italian occupation of his country, his people felt that they were being abandoned by their government.

== Invasion ==
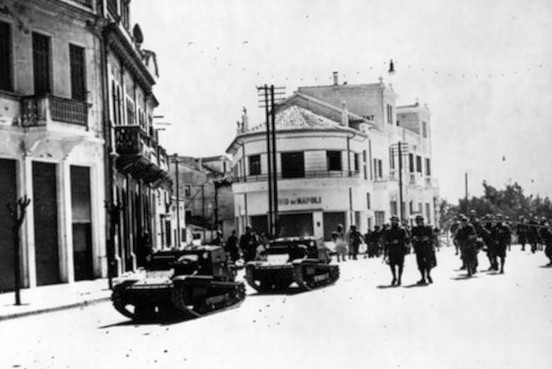
Italian troops and L3/35 tanks in Durrës

The original Italian plans for the invasion called for the deployment of up to 50,000 men who would be supported by 51 naval units and 400 airplanes. Ultimately, the invasion force grew to 100,000 men who were supported by 600 airplanes, but only 22,000 men actually took part in the invasion. On 7 April Mussolini's troops, led by General Alfredo Guzzoni, invaded Albania, simultaneously attacking all Albanian ports. The Italian naval forces which were involved in the invasion consisted of the battleships Giulio Cesare and Conte di Cavour, three heavy cruisers, three light cruisers, nine destroyers, fourteen torpedo boats, one minelayer, ten auxiliary ships and nine transport ships. The ships were divided into four groups that carried out landings at Vlorë, Durrës, Shëngjin and Sarandë. The Romanian Royal Army never deployed to Sarandë and Italy conquered the Romanian concession along with the rest of Albania during the invasion.

On the other side, the regular Albanian army had 15,000 poorly equipped troops who had previously been trained by Italian officers. King Zog's plan was to mount a resistance in the mountains, leaving the ports and the main cities undefended; but Italian agents who were placed in Albania as military instructors sabotaged this plan. As a consequence, the resistance was mainly offered by the Royal Albanian Gendarmerie and small groups of patriots.

In Durrës, a force of 500 Albanians, including gendarmes and armed volunteers, led by Major Abaz Kupi (the commander of the gendarmerie in Durrës), and Mujo Ulqinaku, a naval sergeant, tried to halt the Italian advance. Equipped with small arms and three machine guns and supported by a coastal battery, the defenders resisted the Italians for a few hours before they were defeated by Italian naval fire. The Royal Albanian Navy stationed in Durrës consisted of four patrol boats (each armed with a machine gun) and a coastal battery with four 75 mm guns, the latter also being involved in the fighting. Mujo Ulqinaku, the commander of the patrol boat Tiranë, used his machine gun to kill and wound many Italian troops until being killed himself by an artillery shell from an Italian warship. Eventually, a large number of light tanks were unloaded from the Italian ships. After that, resistance began to crumble, and within five hours the Italians had captured the city.

By 1:30 pm on the first day, all Albanian ports were in Italian hands. King Zog, his wife, Queen Geraldine Apponyi, and their infant son Leka fled to Greece the same day, taking with them part of the gold reserves of the Albanian central bank. On hearing the news, an angry mob attacked the prisons, liberated the prisoners and sacked the King's residence. At 9:30 am on 8 April, Italian troops entered Tirana and quickly captured all government buildings. Italian columns of soldiers then marched to Shkodër, Fier and Elbasan. Shkodër surrendered in the evening after 12 hours of fighting. During the Italian advance in Shkodër the mob besieged the prison and liberated some 200 prisoners.

The number of casualties in these battles is disputed. Italian military reports stated that at Durrës 25 Italians were killed and 97 wounded, while the local townspeople claimed that 400 Italians were killed. Casualties for the Albanians were given as 160 dead and several hundreds wounded.

On 12 April the Albanian parliament voted to depose Zog and unite the nation with Italy "in personal union" by offering the Albanian crown to Italy's King Victor Emmanuel III. The parliament elected Albania's largest landowner, Shefqet Vërlaci, as Prime Minister. Vërlaci served as interim head of state for five days until Victor Emmanuel III formally accepted the Albanian crown in a ceremony at the Quirinale palace in Rome. Victor Emmanuel III appointed Francesco Jacomoni di San Savino, a former ambassador to Albania, to represent him in Albania as "Lieutenant-General of the King" (effectively a viceroy).

In general, the Italian invasion was poorly planned and badly executed, and succeeded only because Albanian resistance was weak. As Filippo Anfuso, Count Ciano's chief assistant sarcastically commented "...if only the Albanians had possessed a well-armed fire-brigade, they could have driven us into the Adriatic".

== Aftermath ==
Kingdom of Italy Albanian Kingdom

Flag of Albania, during Italian rule

On 15 April 1939, Albania withdrew from the League of Nations, from which Italy had resigned in 1937. On 3 June 1939, the Albanian foreign ministry merged into the Italian foreign ministry, and Albanian Foreign Minister Xhemil Dino became an Italian ambassador. Upon the capture of Albania, Italian dictator Benito Mussolini declared the official creation of the Italian Empire and King Victor Emmanuel III was crowned King of the Albanians in addition to his title of Emperor of Ethiopia, which had been occupied by Italy three years before. The Albanian military was placed under Italian command and formally merged into the Italian Army in 1940. Additionally, the Italian Blackshirts formed four legions of Albanian Militia, initially recruited from Italian colonists living in Albania, but later from ethnic Albanians.

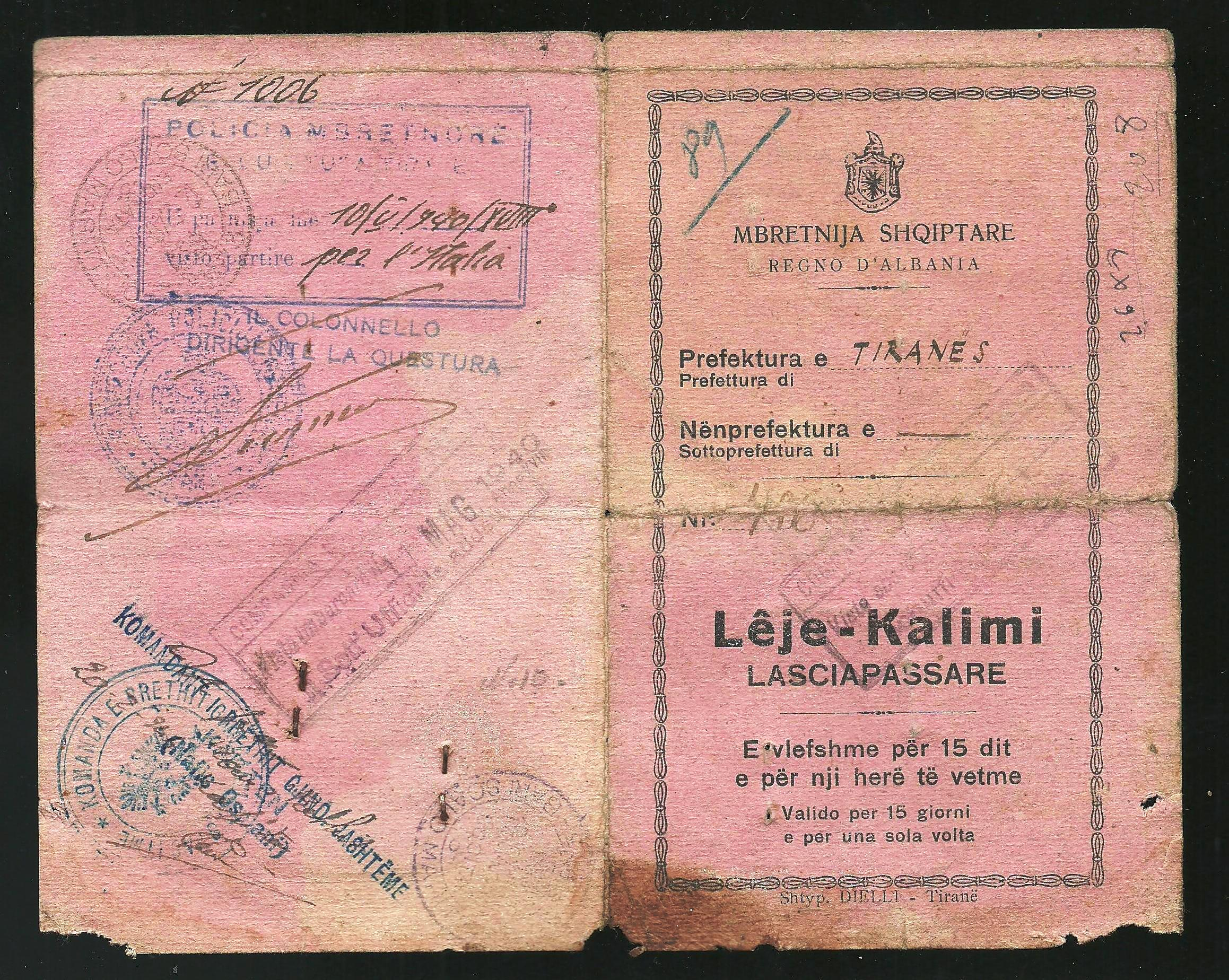
1940 Albanian Kingdom Laissez Passer issued for traveling to Fascist Italy after the invasion from the previous year

Upon the occupation of Albania and the installation of a new government, the economies of Albania and Italy were merged by a customs union which resulted in the removal of most trade restrictions. Through a tariff union, the Italian tariff system was put in place in Albania. Due to the expected economic losses in Albania from the alteration in tariff policy, the Italian government provided Albania 15 million Albanian leks each year in compensation. Italian customs laws were to apply in Albania and only Italy alone could conclude treaties with third parties. Italian capital was allowed to dominate the Albanian economy. As a result, Italian companies were allowed to hold monopolies in the exploitation of Albanian natural resources. All petroleum resources in Albania went through Agip, Italy's state petroleum company.

Albania followed Italy into war against Britain and France on 10 June 1940. Albania served as the base for the Italian invasion of Greece in October 1940, and Albanian troops participated in the Greek campaign, but they massively deserted the front line. The country's southern areas (including the cities of Gjirokastër and Korçë) were temporarily occupied by the Greek army during that campaign. In May 1941, after the Balkans campaign Blitzkrieg, Albania was enlarged by the annexation of Kosovo and parts of Montenegro and the Vardar Banovina, going a long way towards the realization of nationalistic claims for a "Greater Albania". Part of the western coast of Epirus which was called Chameria was not annexed, instead, it was put under the rule of an Albanian High Commissioner who exercised nominal control of it. When Italy left the Axis powers in September 1943 (Fall of the Fascist regime in Italy), Wehrmacht troops immediately occupied Albania in a short campaign, with relatively strong resistance. They also occupied Italy.

During the Second World War, the Albanian Partisans, including some Albanian nationalist groups, sporadically fought against the Italians (after autumn 1942) and, subsequently, they sporadically fought against the Wehrmacht. By October 1944, the Army Group E had withdrawn from the southern Balkans in response to military defeats which they had suffered at the hands of the Red Army, the collapse of Romania and the imminent fall of Bulgaria. After the Wehrmacht had left Albania, also due to the rapid advance of Albanian Communist forces, the Albanian Partisans crushed nationalist resistance and the leader of the Albanian Communist Party, Enver Hoxha, became the ruler of the country.

== Cultural references ==
The events which surrounded the Italian annexation of Albania formed part of the inspiration for the eighth volume of The Adventures of Tintin comics titled King Ottokar's Sceptre, with a plot based on a fictional Balkan country Syldavia and uneasy tensions with its larger neighbour Borduria. The author of the Tintin comics Hergé also insisted that his editor publish the work to take advantage of current events in 1939 as he felt "Syldavia is Albania".

== See also ==
- Adriatic campaign of World War II
- Albanian Fascist Militia
- Albania–Italy relations
- Royal Albanian Army
- Royal Italian Army

== Sources ==
- Fischer, Bernd J. (1999). Albania at War, 1939–1945. Purdue University Press. ISBN 978-155753141-4 – via Google Books.
- Fischer, Bernd J. (1999). Albania at War, 1939–1945. C. Hurst & Co Publishers. ISBN 978-185065531-2.
- Library of Congress Country Study of Albania
