= Assassination of Essad Pasha Toptani =

1920 murder in Paris, France

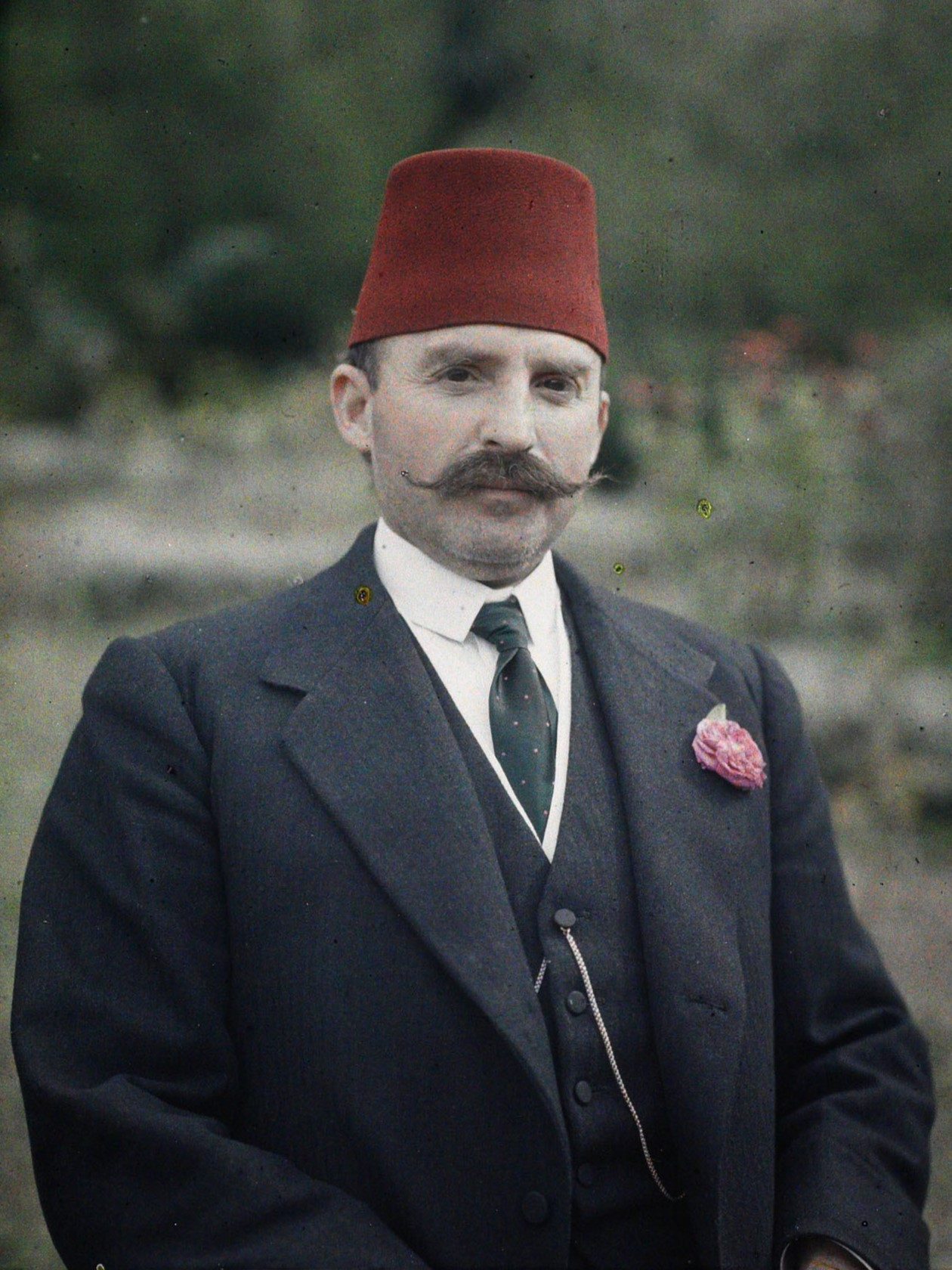
- Essad Pasha in 1913
- Location: France, Paris
- Date: 13 June 1920
- Attack type: Assassination
- Deaths: Essad Pasha
- Perpetrator: Avni Rustemi

Essad Pasha Toptani was an Albanian politician who served as the third Prime Minister of Albania from 1914 until 1916 and was a former Ottoman army officer. He was assassinated on 13 June 1920 in Paris by Avni Rustemi.

== Assassination ==
On 13 June 1920, Avni Rustemi shot Toptani to death outside the Hotel Continental on Castiglione Street in Paris, where Toptani was dining with his nephew Xhemil bej Vlora and his mistress Eliza.

Rustemi had been hiding behind one of the columns at the hotel entrance, waiting for Toptani. Approaching from behind, he fired with a Smith & Wesson revolver. The first bullet struck Toptani in the neck near the spinal column, and as he turned with his hands raised to protect himself, Rustemi fired again, hitting the left side of his chest at armpit level. Toptani, long considered an unscrupulous opportunist and a collaborator with the Serbians and Montenegrins during the Balkan Wars, had many political enemies in Albania.

Rustemi was immediately arrested by the French police, and the assassination quickly attracted the attention of the European press. After a long trial, he was acquitted on 20 December 1920, when his lawyer Anatole de Monzie argued that the act was not merely a personal crime but one committed “with the premeditation of an entire people.” According to historian Kastriot Dervishi, the assassination was instigated by Toptani's cousin and rival Aqif Pasha Elbasani, with financial backing provided by the High Council of Regency.

== Aftermath ==
When Rustemi returned to Albania after the acquittal, he was hailed as a national hero, which marked the beginning of his political career as a member of parliament.
