= Bicanic =

Bicanic is a spelling without diacritics of the following surnames:

- Bićanić
- Bičanić
