= Toptani family =

Noble family from Albania

Toptani
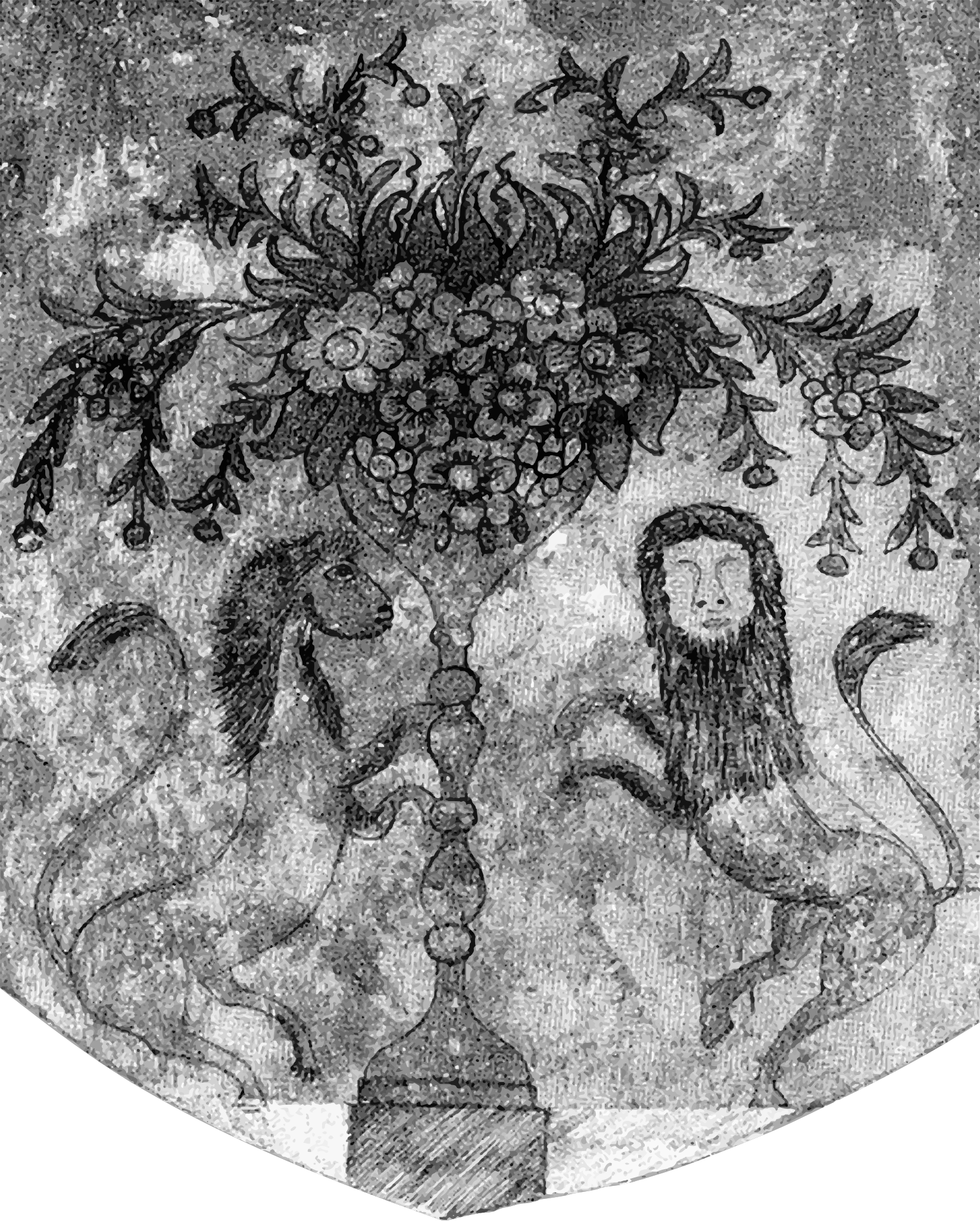
- Coat of arms
- Current region: Central Albania
- Origin: Krujë
- Members: Essad Pasha Toptani; Abdi Toptani; Sadijé Toptani; Murat Toptani; Fuat Toptani
- Estates: 50,000 hectares between Durres and Tirana

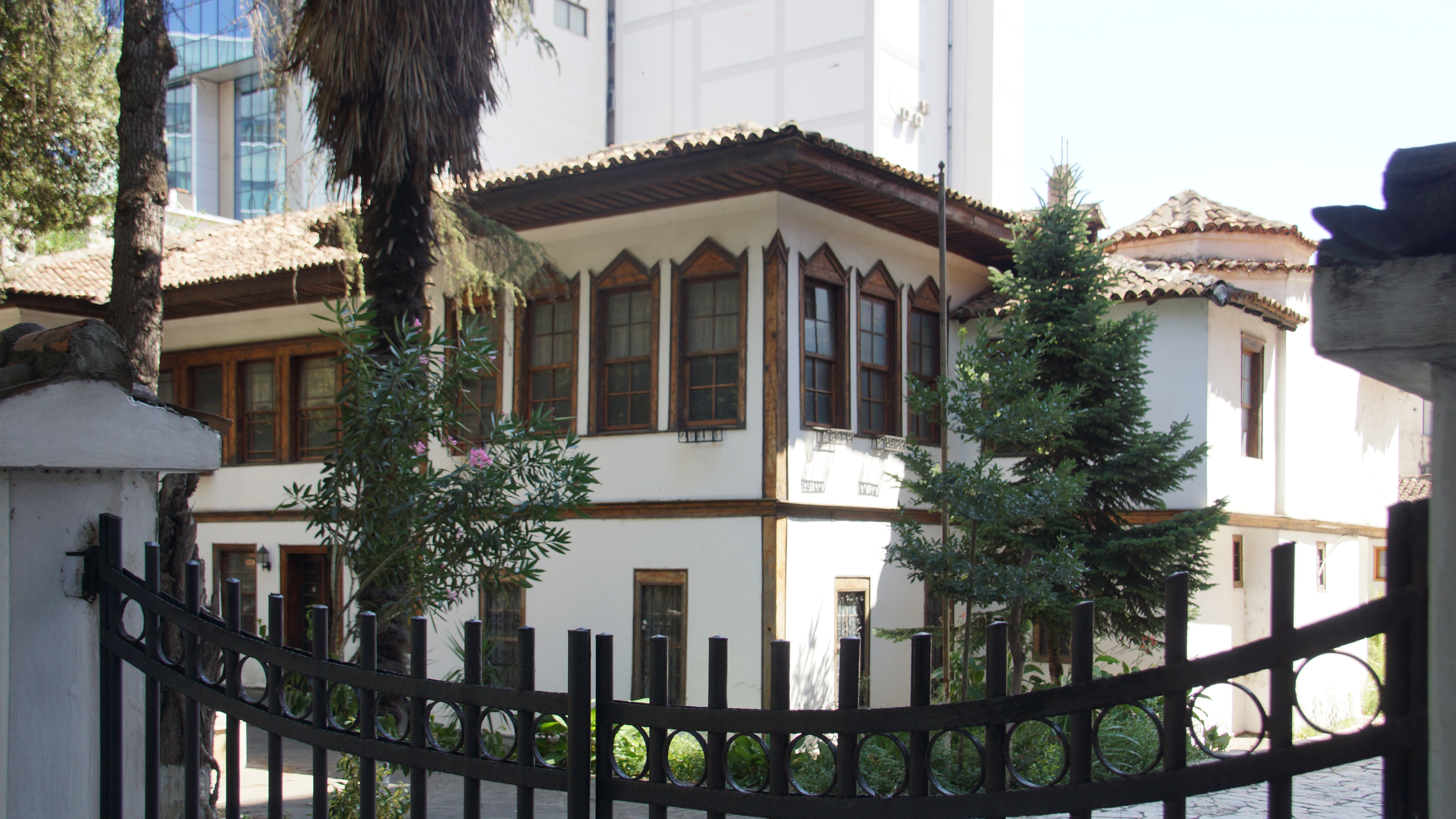
Abedin Toptani's serail in Tirana

The Toptani were a leading noble family in central Albania at the beginning of the 20th century. They belonged to a small number of noble families appointed by the Ottomans who used local chieftains to control Ottoman Albania more easily. Essad Pasha Toptani, a family patriarch, claimed that the family descended from the Thopia family. According to some sources, the name is derived from the word top, which means cannon, as the family owned a cannon at a time when artillery was rare.

== Estates ==
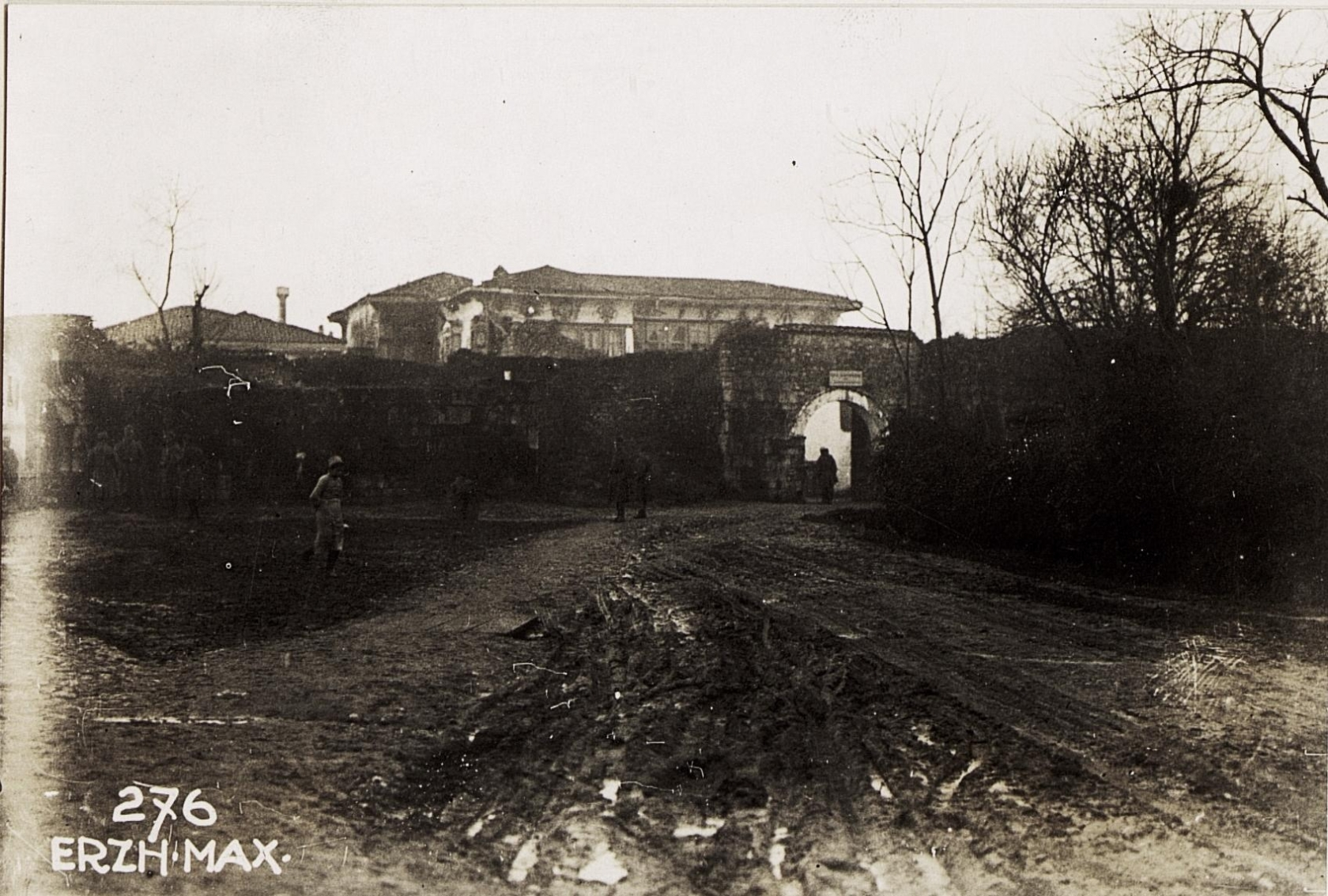
House of the sisters of Essad Pasha in 1917

The Toptani family initially lived in Krujë before moving to Tirana during the 17th century, when many sipahis moved from rural regions of the Ottoman Empire to cities. Their move from Krujë to Tirana probably contributed to the development of sharecropping in Albania.

The Toptani family possessed around 50,000 hectares near Tirana and Durrës and remained one of the main landowners until the end of the Second World War.

In July 2023, it was announced that Oppenheim Architecture had won the competition to restore Albania's Besa Museum housed in Tirana's Former House of Toptani Family, aiming to showcase Albania's historic Besa code and its role in providing refuge, from the Holocaust to contemporary times.

== Notable members ==
Notable members of the family include:

- Abdi Toptani
- Blendi Fevziu (adopted)
- Essad Toptani
- Fuad Toptani
- Gani Toptani
- Murad Toptani
- Sadije Toptani, Queen Mother of the Albanians
- Refik Bej Toptani
- Qemoran Toptani
