= Qemoran Toptani =

Albanian surgeon (1912 - 1981)

Qemoran Toptani (1912–1981) was an Albanian surgeon. She is often referred to as the first female Albanian surgeon.

== Biography ==
Qemoran Fuat Toptani was born in Tirana in 1912. She was a member of the Toptani family, a noble family that remained one of the largest landowners in Albania until the end of World War II. She was the niece of Fuad Toptani. Qemoran Toptani attended primary school in Tirana, then secondary school in Vienna. She completed her post-secondary education in Rome, Italy. During the final years of the Second World War, Toptani returned to Tirana, where she worked as a doctor treated the wounded. She later worked at the Peshkopia Hospital in Peshkopi. She was considered one of the best surgeons of the war in Albania.
