= Qemal Karaosmani =

Signatory of the Albanian Declaration of Independence

Qemal bey Karaosmani
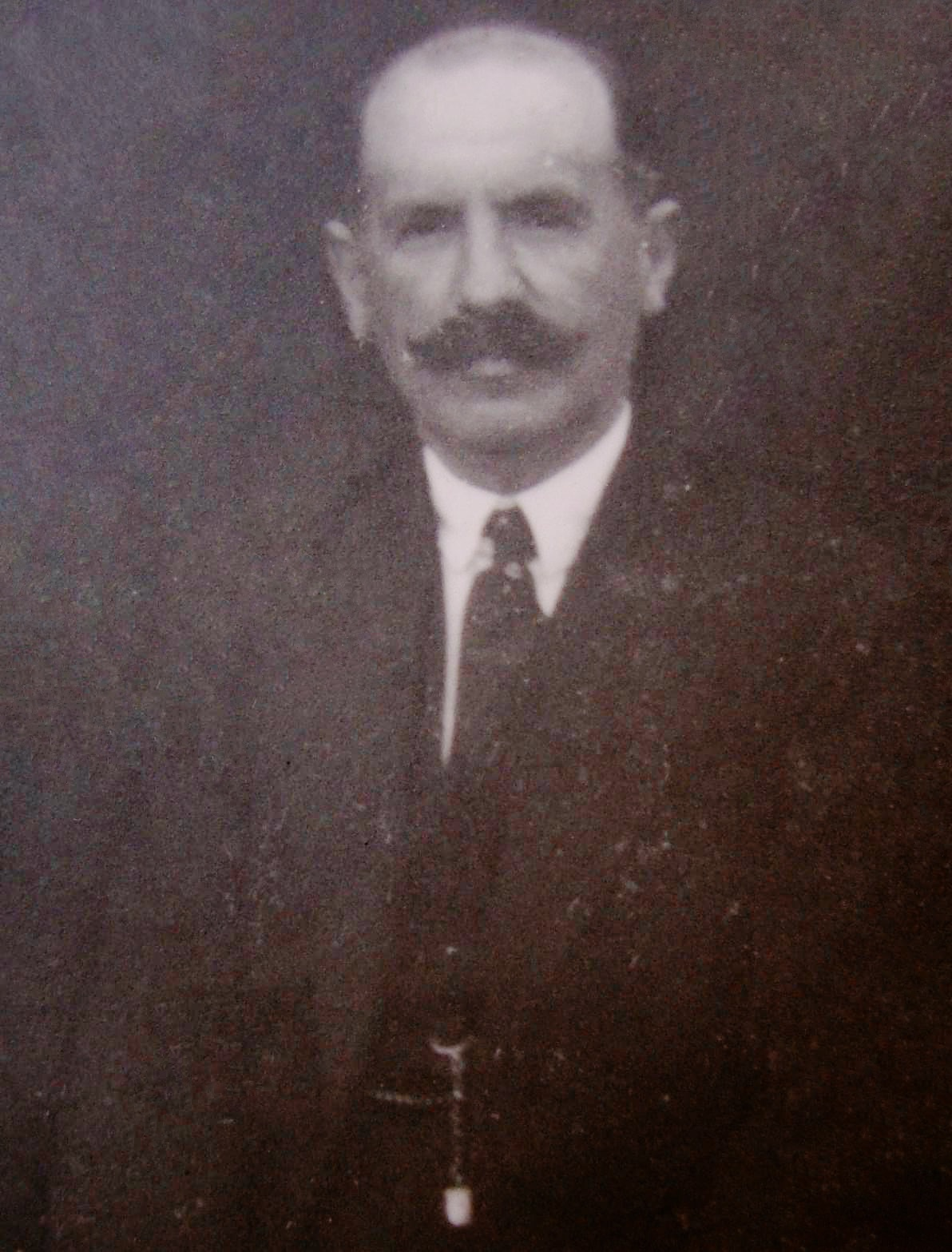
- Born: 17 July 1875; Elbasan, Ottoman Empire (modern Albania)
- Died: 5 August 1949 (aged 74); Kavajë, People's Socialist Republic of Albania
- Occupations: Politician, civil clerk
- Known for: Participating in Albanian Declaration of Independence of 1912
- Spouse: Aishe Resuli
- Relatives: Masar, Hadije, Qamuran, Sheriar, Behije, Ali (6 Children), Odeta Nishani (Granddaughter), Aqif Pasha Elbasani (Cousin), Ibrahim Biçakçiu (Cousin)
- Family: Karaosmani

Qemal bej Karaosmani (17 July 1875 – 5 August 1949) was one of the signatories of the Albanian Declaration of Independence, and an activist of Albanian education. He served as General Secretary and briefly as Minister of Agriculture in the Provisional Government of Albania.

== Life ==
Karaosmani was born in Elbasan, back then part of Manastir Vilayet of the Ottoman Empire, today's central Albania, to an Albanian family. His family surname Karaosmani translates to “Black Ottoman” Kara meaning black in Turkish and Osmani being Ottoman in Albanian. He got his first studies in the Ottoman school of his home town. Later he finished the high school and the graduate studies in Istanbul where he got a degree for Political Sciences and Civic Administration.

During his studies in Istanbul, he got in contact with some Albanian patriots and activists, especially Murat Toptani, who would become a close friend. After the graduation, he was appointed to work in the Prefecture in Yannina where he did not stay long. He got transferred in Berat where he was in charge of the Cadastral Office, this is where he met Aishe Resuli his wife. There he was in close contact and cooperation with other activists of the Albanian education as Babë Dudë Karbunara, Aziz Vrioni, and Iliaz Vrioni. Based on his contribution to the Albanian education, he was invited in 1908 as a delegate in the Congress of Monastir. Karaosmani was relative to Aqif Pasha Elbasani. Both cousins would contribute to the Congress of Elbasan of 1909 where the Albanian Normal School (Alb:Shkolla Normale e Elbasanit) was established.

In November 1912, Karaosmani was elected by the Berat leadership as a delegate in the Assembly of Vlora. He signed the act of the Independence Declaration as "Qemal Elbasani". He would be appointed later by Ismail Qemali as first secretary, and by late November 1913 Minister of Agriculture of Albania.

Karaosmani supported the Congress of Lushnje of 1920, and the government of Sulejman Delvina which came out of it. He was elected in the National Assembly twice: first representing Berat out of elections of December 27, 1923, and those of May 17, 1925 which marked the First Albanian Republic (1925–1928).

After the Italian invasion of Albania, Karaosmani moved to Kavajë with his family where he lived for the rest of his life. He died in 1948, never appreciated by the communists, and without any official ceremony. His family donated in 1962 the original pen with which he had signed the act of Independence Declaration to the Albanian National Archives. Due to their wealth, the family were considered bejlere (beys) and were persecuted. His home in the "Spaikorre" neighborhood of Elbasan got confiscated.

== Family ==
Qemal Karaosmani got married in 1900 to Aishe Resuli, a woman from one of the richest and most powerful families of Berat. The couple has six children: Masar, Hadije, Qamuran, Sheriar, Behije, and Ali. One of his granddaughters are Odeta Nishani (née Kosova, is Karaosmani on her mothers side).
