= Ibrahim Biçakçiu =

Albanian politician (1905–1977)

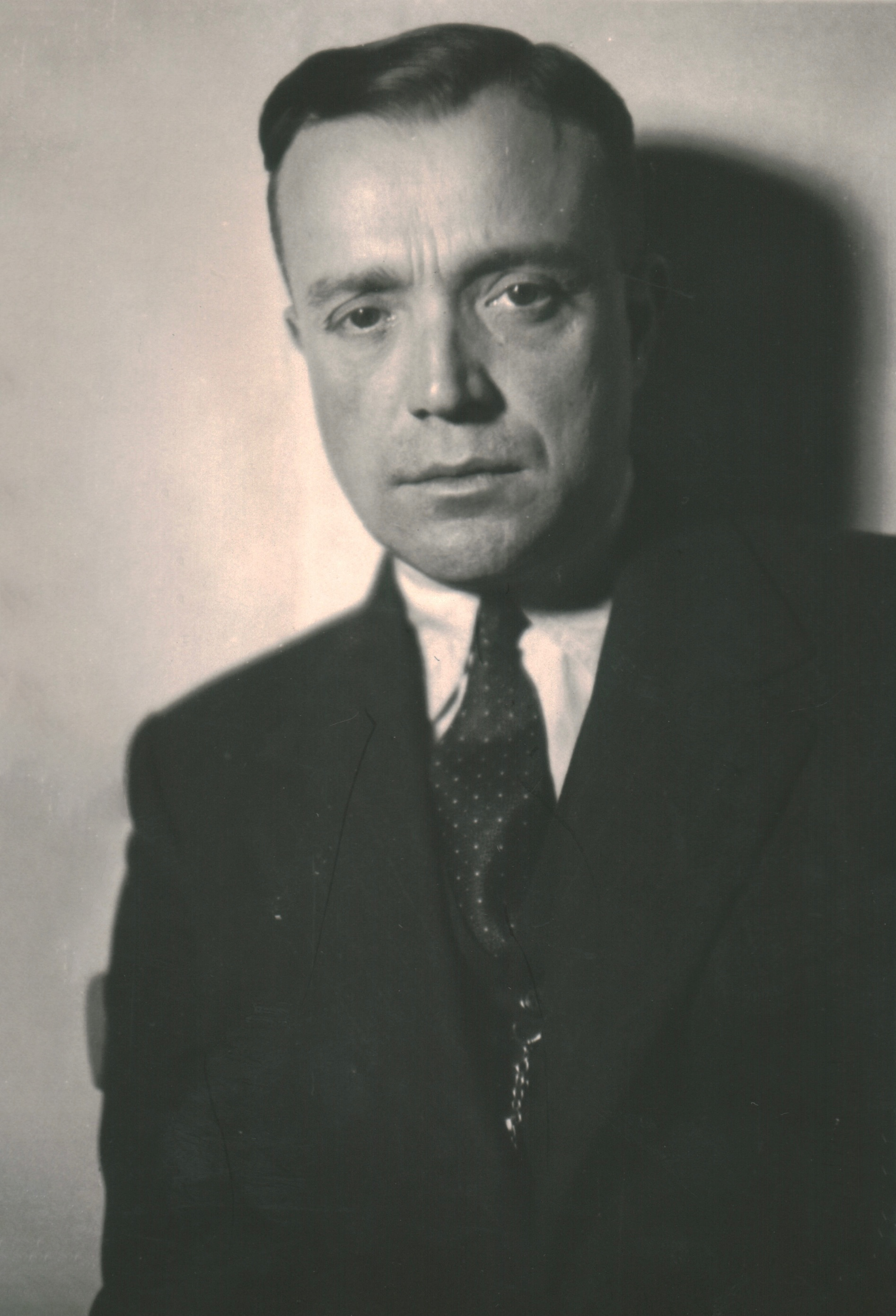

Chairman of the Provisional Executive Committee
- In office 14 September 1943 – 24 October 1943
- Preceded by: Office created
- Succeeded by: Mehdi Frashëri

21st Prime Minister of Albania
- In office 29 August 1944 – 20 October 1944
- Preceded by: Fiqri Dine
- Succeeded by: Enver Hoxha

Personal details
- Born: 10 September 1905 Elbasan, Albania (then Manastir Vilayet, Ottoman Empire)
- Died: 4 January 1977 (aged 71) Elbasan, People's Socialist Republic of Albania
- Party: Balli Kombëtar
- Relations: Mahmud Pertef Pasha Biçakçiu (Grandfather), Shefikat Hanëm Alizoti (Grandmother), Qemal Karaosmani (Cousin), Vasfije Alizoti (Great Aunt), Essad Pasha Toptani, Gani Toptani, Nejre Toptani, Sabushe Toptani, Merushe Toptani (Cousins)
- Parent(s): Aqif Pasha Biçakçiu (Father), Ifete Hanëm Vrioni (Mother)
- Profession: Prime Minister, Agronomist

Ibrahim Aqif Biçakçiu (also known as Ibrahim Biçakçiu) (10 September 1905 – 4 January 1977) was an Albanian landowner and Axis collaborator, Chairman of the Provisional Executive Committee from 14 September to 24 October 1943, and Prime Minister of Albania from 29 August to 20 October 1944 during the Nazi occupation.

== Biography ==
=== Early life ===
Born in 1905, Elbasan which was located in the Manastir vilayet of the Ottoman Empire, today modern day central Albania. Ibrahim Biçakçiu was the son of Aqif Pasha Biçakçiu of Elbasan and the grandson of Mustafa Pasha Biçakçiu, patriarch of one of the three landowning influential and respected Albanian families of the town. His grandmother Shefikat Hanëm Alizoti was from the Alizoti family, which made him the he cousin of Esad Pasha Toptani and his family. His mother was Ifete Hanëm Vrioni of the Vrioni family. His surname, derived from Turkish bıçakçı, means "knifesmith" suggesting that was his ancestors craft/ profession (cognate with the Bosniak surname Bičakčić). His family helped in the Independence of Albania and it was through his family's influence that he grew up with the same ideology and beliefs.

=== World War II ===
In 1943, together with Bedri bey Pejani and Xhafer Deva, he helped found a national committee of twenty-two Albanian and Kosovo Albanian leaders, which declared Albania independent from fascist occupation and which elected an executive committee to form a provisional government.

=== Prime minister ===
Following a week of negotiations, Ibrahim Biçakçiu agreed to lead a new and small government after Fiqiri Dine. Although Biçakçiu was the perfect friend of Germany, his reign was nevertheless quite incompetent. This was mainly because Germany was on the brink of defeat and the Albanian partisans were moving out, ready to strike. Tirana paper noted that he had headed the provisional executive committee exactly one year earlier, prior to the construction of the Mitrovica government. It was noted that Biçakçiu would occasionally play Ping-Pong with Ambassador Martin Schliep.

=== After the war ===
Despite many of the Ballists fleeing Albania after the Communists announced their victory, Biçakçiu, like Anton Harapi and Cafo Beg Ulqini, chose not to leave and decided that he would rather die in his country of birth than on foreign soil. He was arrested by communist forces in Shkodra on 6 December 1944 and was sentenced to life in prison at the Special Court in Tirana on 13 April 1945. He spent most of his years in prison in Burrel and was released on 5 May 1962 in Elbasan. In his last years he was given a job as a public lavatory cleaner in Elbasan. Biçakçiu died on 4 January 1977.

Political offices
Preceded by Position Established	Chairman of the Provisional Executive Committee; September 14, 1943–October 24, 1943	Succeeded by Mehdi Bej Frashëri
Preceded by Fiqri Dine	Prime Minister of Albania (under Nazi Germany); August 29, 1944–October 20, 1944	Succeeded by Enver Hoxha
