= Bićanić =

Bićanić is a Croatian surname. The Croatian census of 2011 listed it as the most common surname in Plitvička Jezera and one of the most common surnames in Rakovica and Saborsko.

Notable people with the surname include:

- Sonia Bićanić, an English academic, author and translator
- Rudolf Bićanić (1905–1968), Croatian scholar

== See also ==
- Bičanić
