= Ilir Ikonomi =

Albanian writer & journalist (born 1954)

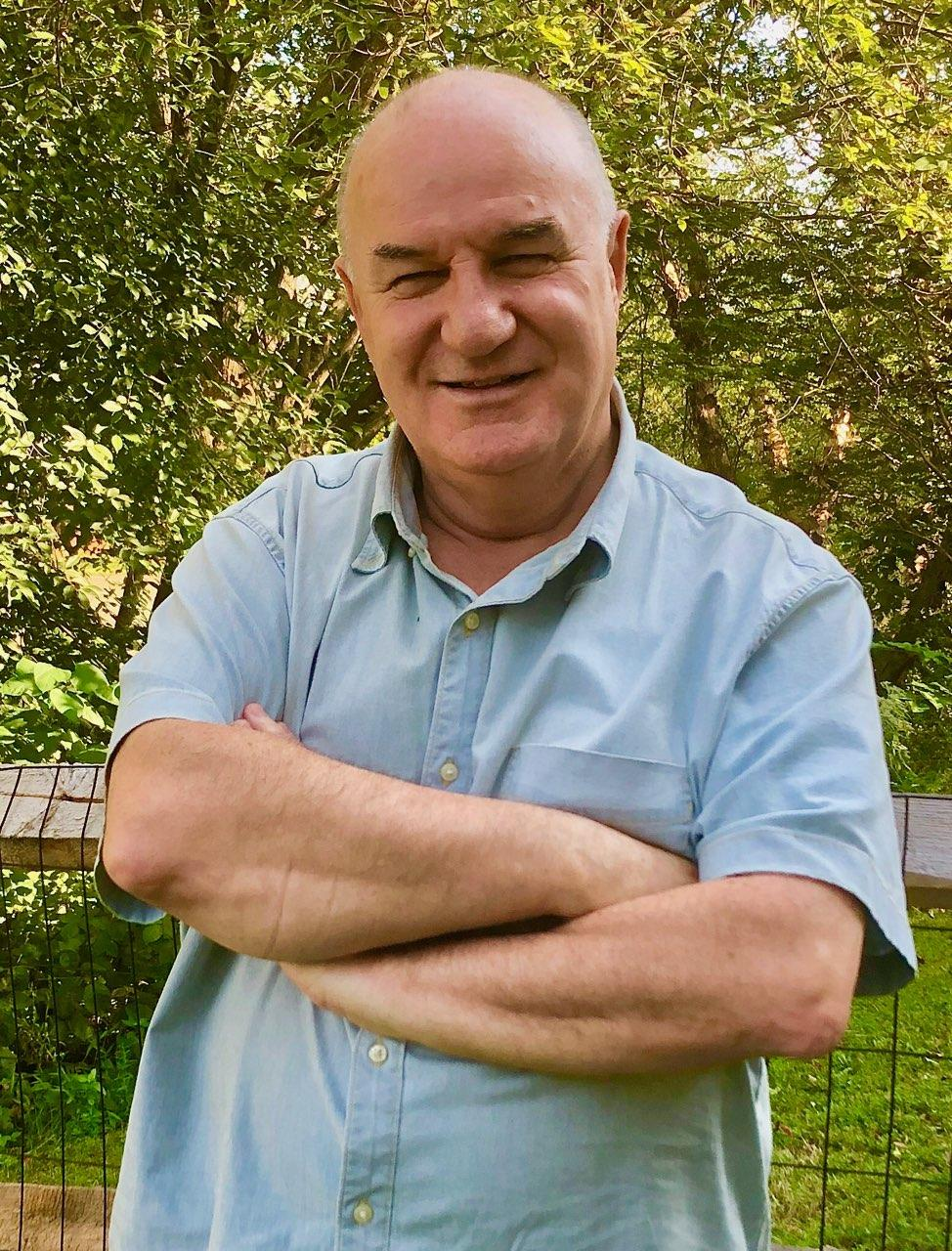
- Ikonomi in Centreville, Virginia
- Born: 1 September 1954 (age 70); Pogradec, Albania
- Occupation(s): Writer, journalist

Ilir Ikonomi (born September 1, 1954) is an Albanian-American journalist and author who has written several books on the history of Albania. Ikonomi's work, "Pavarësia - Udhëtimi i paharruar i Ismail Qemalit" (Independence – The unforgettable journey of Ismail Qemali), was included in the year-long celebration of the 100th Anniversary of the Independence of Albania as a literary accomplishment.

== Literary works ==
Ikonomi debuted in April 2011 with the Albanian language biography “Faik Konica: Jeta në Uashington” (meaning, Faik Konitza: Life in Washington). The book received high praise for its new revelations about the life of Albania’s prominent writer and diplomat, Faik Konitza, and became a national bestseller.

In 2012, Ikonomi published “Pavarësia: Udhëtimi i paharruar i Ismail Qemalit” (Independence: The Unforgettable Journey of Ismail Qemali). The book coincided with the 100th anniversary of Albania's independence and was warmly received for breaking new ground in the study of the events leading to the founding of the state of Albania. It tracks the historic journey of Albania's founding father Ismail Qemali that took him from Istanbul to Vlora to proclaim independence from Ottoman rule. The book quickly became popular and won the author a Medal of Gratitude from the President of Albania, Bujar Nishani.

In May 2014, Ikonomi published “Pushtimi,” a work on the 1939 occupation of Albania by fascist Italy, as narrated by Hugh G. Grant, the U.S. Envoy in Tirana when the invasion took place.

In 2016, Ikonomi published "Essad pasha Toptani: The Man, the War, the Power", an impartial biography of Essad Pasha Toptani, "arguably the most controversial power broker in the initial decade of Albania's existence as a state." In 2017, the book was on the national bestsellers list.

== Life and career ==
Ilir Ikonomi was born in Pogradec, Albania on September 1, 1954. His father was a doctor, and his mother an educator. Having lost his mother at the age of six, he spent his childhood alternately in Tirana and Berat where he graduated from high school. In 1973, he was awarded a scholarship by the Albanian government to study Chinese Language in Beijing, China. He first completed a 6-month preparatory course in Beijing Language Institute and went on to study Chinese language in Beijing University, where he received a bachelor's degree in 1978. Returning to Albania, he worked for the government controlled Radio Tirana as a Chinese language translator until the end of 1991. As the old communist regime began to collapse, he was hired by Reuters news agency, becoming its first correspondent in Albania. His reports covered a wide range of topics and were printed in newspapers worldwide, including the New York Times, the Washington Times and others. In September 1992, he left Albania to work for the Voice of America, a Washington, DC–based media organization funded by the U.S. Congress. He has covered stories on Albania's road to democracy and Kosovo's independence. On June 12, 1999, he became among the first Western journalists to enter Kosovo immediately after NATO ended its bombing campaign against Serbian troops. He was also among the first foreign journalists to report on mass graves in Kosovo following the conflict. Ilir Ikonomi now currently lives in Washington, DC.
