= 100th Anniversary of the Independence of Albania =

Albanian event in 2012

- Date: 28 November 2012
- Location: Albania
- Also known as: Centennial of the Independence of Albania
- Participants: Albanians worldwide

The 100th Anniversary of the Independence of Albania was a yearlong celebration in 2012 when Albanians celebrated the 100th anniversary of establishing independent Albania, the first Albanian state in modern history.

== Celebration ==
=== In Albania ===
The opening day of celebration was on 17 January 2012 when the solemn ceremony was organized in parliament of Republic of Albania and attended by representatives from Kosovo, North Macedonia, Montenegro, Preševo and Bujanovac, who were together in Albanian Parliament without any distinctions like they were together in parliament of Independent Albania 100 years earlier. Most events and activities were planned to begin in October–November, and due to budgetary reasons, many other projects did not receive government funding in 2012. The Kosovo Security Force formed a special unit of 65 soldiers to participate in the military parade in Tirana on 28 November 2012, which was organized to celebrate the anniversary.

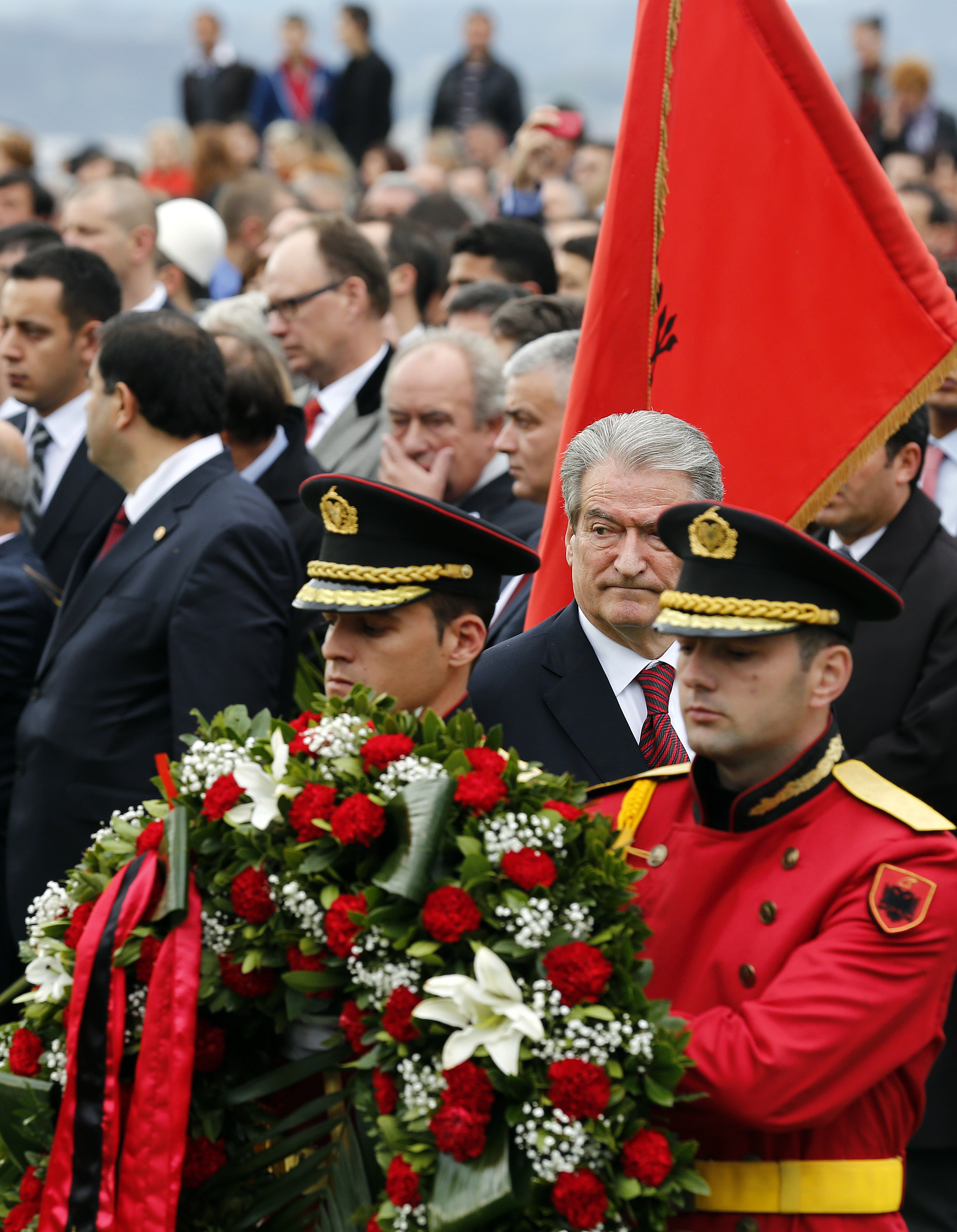
Ceremonies being performed at the Martyrs of Nation Cemetery

The government of Albania decided to bring back the remains of the king Zog of Albania from France where he died in 1961. The remains were exhumed and the return ceremony was organized on 17 November, ahead of celebrations for Albania's 100th independence anniversary. The remains were placed in the reconstructed Mausoleum of the Albanian Royal Family. An exhibition of the artistic works of Agim Ramadani, a leader of the Kosovo Liberation Army (KLA), was opened in the framework of the 100th Anniversary of the Independence of Albania and visited by prime minister Berisha.

The program of celebration for 28 November includes military parade in Tirana, concerts of folk and popular music in Tirana and Vlorë, hoisting the flag by the president of the republic, laying wreaths of flowers at Ismail Qemali tomb, president's speech at a rally dedicated to the anniversary, ceremony of hoisting the flag and laying of the wreaths of flowers at the Martyrs' of the Nation Cemetery and inaugurating of the Monument of Independence.

==== Monument, logo and TV spot ====
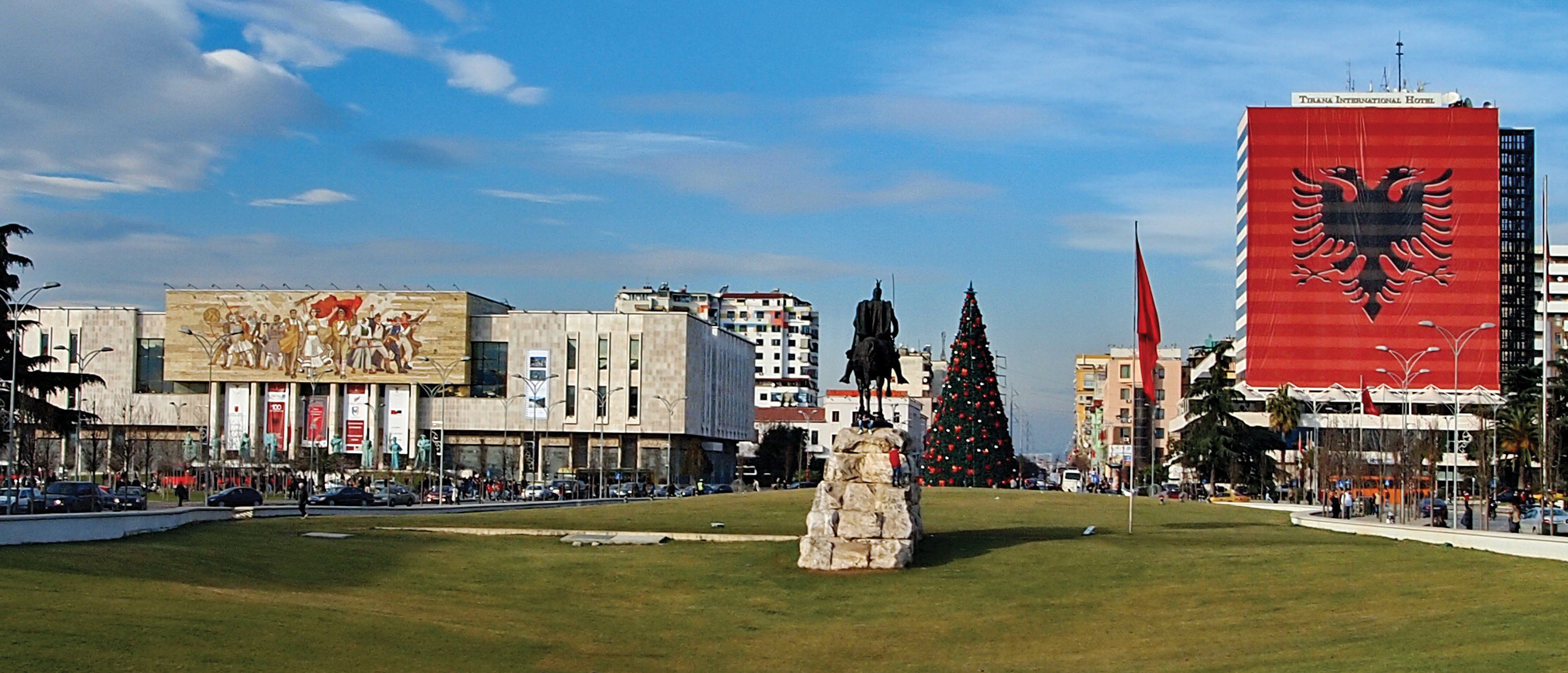
Decorations in the Center of Tirana

The Ministry of Tourism, Cultural Affairs, Youth and Sports announced on 22 December 2011 the International Competition for the accomplishment in sculpture of the monumental work dedicated to "100 anniversary of the Declaration of Independence of the Albanian State: 28 November 1912 – 28 November 2012". The project of two architects from Germany, Visar Obrija and Kai Roman Kiklas, won the award. The artwork will be built in Austria at a cost of 350,000 euros. It resembles a house which is opening from isolation toward freedom. On 29 June 2012 Prime Minister of Albania announced that the monument is finished and that it will be erected at the Rinia Park or near Children's Theater.

Twenty five artists from Albania, Kosovo and North Macedonia participated on the competition "100 Years of the Albanian State", organized to create a logo of the anniversary. On its session held on 28 November 2011 the commission unanimously decided that winner is logo whose author is Zeni Ballazhi. The Prime Minister of Albania Sali Berisha proposed to replace the words Albanian State in the original version of the motto with Independence claiming that Albanian state existed earlier in the history.

The same ministry organized an international competition for TV spot dedicated to the anniversary.

==== Notable participants ====
It is announced that Prime Minister of Turkey will participate in the celebrations of the 100th Anniversary of the Independence of Albania. Hillary Clinton promised that she will come to Tirana on the 100th anniversary of the Independence of Albania. Also many other famous Albanian stars, actors, public personalities all over the world are expected in Tirana. Clinton arrived in Albania on 1 November 2012.

Notable participants on 28 November:

2 presidents:

- Atifete Jahjaga (Republic of Kosovo)
- Filip Vujanović (Montenegro)

4 Prime Ministers:

- Hashim Thaçi (Republic of Kosovo)
- Zoran Milanović (Croatia)
- Viktor Orbán (Hungary)
- Janez Janša (Slovenia)

5 Parliament Speakers:

- Gianfranco Fini (Italy)
- Michael Frendo (Malta)
- Jakup Krasniqi (Republic of Kosovo)
- Denis Bećirović (Bosnia and Herzegovina),
- Eduard Kukan (member of European Parliament)

3 foreign ministers:

- Michael Spindelegger (Austria)
- Mourad Medelci (Algeria)
- Sheikh Hamad bin Jassim bin Jaber Al Thani (Qatar)

George Ivanov president of the Republic of North Macedonia canceled his visit because of the incidents. The Greek foreign minister did not attend, having cancelled after the Albanian Prime Minister made statements regarding the irredentist concept of a Greater Albania.

==== Literature, scholarship and the arts ====
Within Albania books and works of art related to Albanian history and culture were presented to the public by publishing houses, private businesses, universities, and scholars on the occasion of the 100th anniversary, including:

- A new high-definition version of the 1953 Scanderbeg film.
- Shqiptarët në artin botëror (Albanians in world art) by Ferid Hudhri (Botimet Albanologjike, 2012).
- A new Albanian version and English translation of what is considered the first work of literature and history by an Albanian author, The Siege of Shkodra (Onufri Publishing House, 2012).
- Pavarësia - Udhëtimi i paharruar i Ismail Qemalit (Independence – The unforgettable journey of Ismail Qemali), by Ilir Ikonomi (UET Press, 2012).
- The Birth of Albania: Ethnic Nationalism, the Great Powers of World War I and the Emergence of Albanian Independence by Nicola Guy (I.B. Tauris, 2012).
- Jeta e jashtëzakonshme e amerikanit Charles Telford Erickson kushtuar Shqipërisë (The extraordinary life of Charles Telford Erickson devoted to Albania) by Mal Berisha (Botime Edualba, 2012).

=== Outside Albania ===
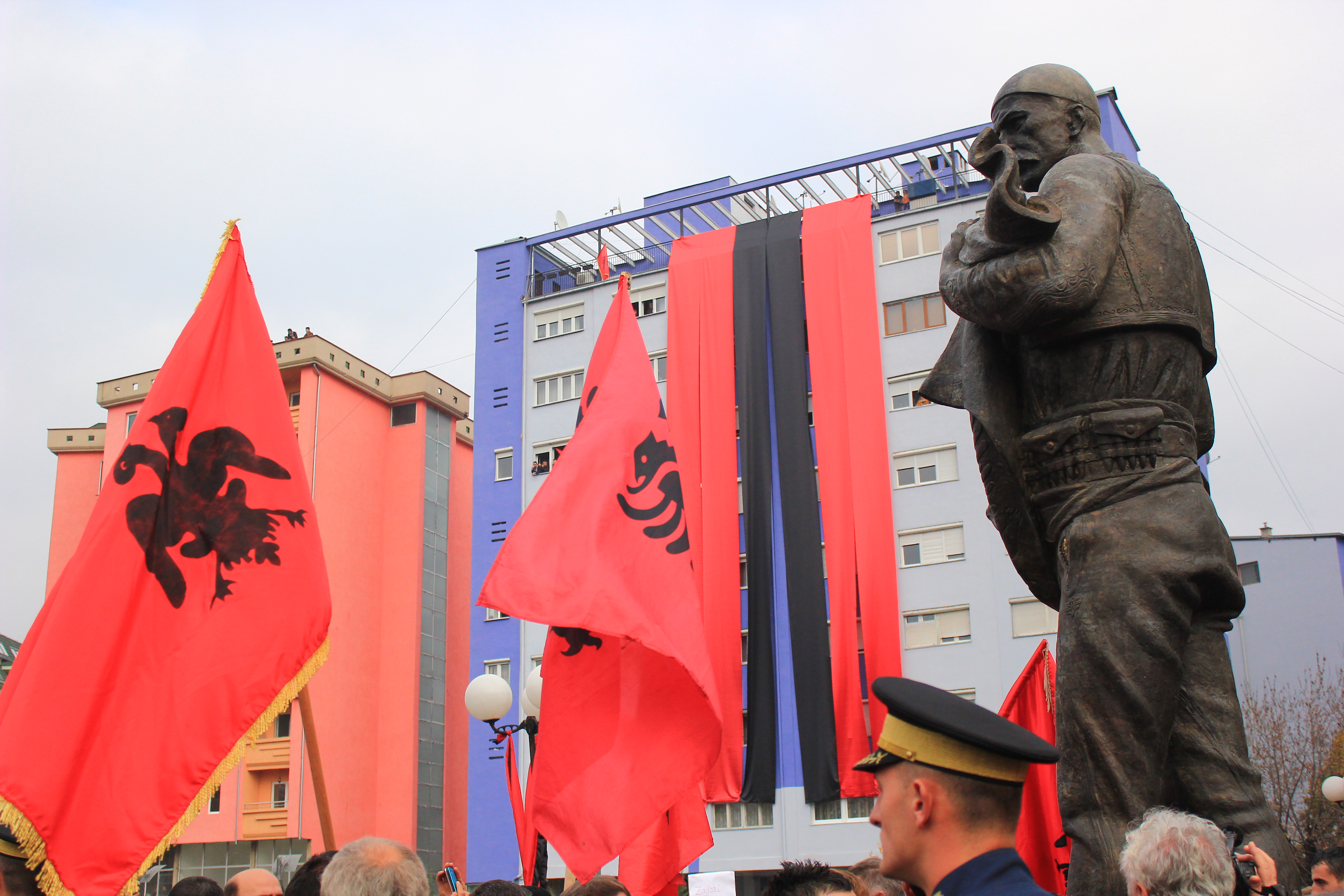
Celebrations in Mitrovica

Embassies of Albania all around the world organized numerous activities to celebrate 100th Anniversary of the Independence of Albania such as exhibitions, concerts, prayers, diplomatic receptions, various ceremonies and round tables. In some cases events are organized not only by embassies of Albania but other institutions as well. The Leiden University Centre for Linguistics in Netherlands hosted two events on 9 and 10 November 2012: the screening of the film The Forgiveness of Blood and the public symposium "Albanian language and culture: 100 years of independence."

In North Macedonia and Kosovo celebrations are organized by the official authorities.

==== Republic of Macedonia ====
The Macedonian Government participated in the financing of the celebration of 100th Anniversary of the Independence of Albania.

On 17 January 2012 in Skopje, Macedonia the construction of the Skanderbeg Square had started. On 8 May 2012 the municipality of Tetovo established the organisational council responsible for the celebration and prepared some activities under motto "100 years without Albania" (Albanian: 100 vite pa Shqipërinë).

The historians in Macedonia believe that the Macedonian Government did not have any right, obligation nor reason to celebrate independence of the neighboring country, let alone to finance such celebrations.

The central celebration of 100 years of Albania was held in Skopje on 25 November 2012 in Boris Trajkovski Sports Center. It was attended by around 20,000 people including prime ministers of Albania and Kosovo. On the same day in Skopje was organized the Eagles' March during which ethnic Albanians wearing red and black clothes marched with flags of Albania through Skopje while some Macedonian politicians opposed these kinds of celebrations because of the danger of fueling ethnic tensions. Several incidents occurred including burning the Macedonian flag in Čair municipality of Skopje predominantly populated with Albanians while several children of allegedly Macedonian ethnicity were beaten by a group of 30 people, the police has not commented on their ethnicity.

==== Kosovo ====
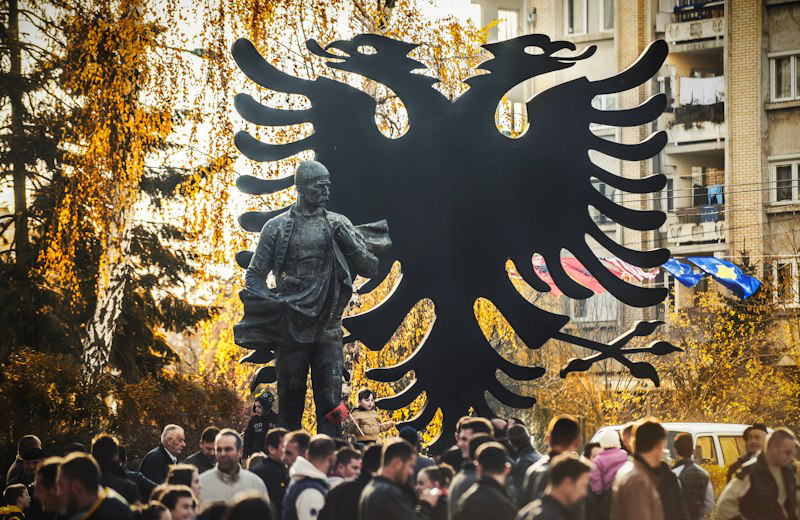
Isa Boletini statue in the centre of Mitrovica, Kosovo inaugurated during the 100th anniversary of the independence of Albania.

Rita Ora plans to sing a few songs in Kosovo to celebrate this anniversary after being invited by the president of the Republic of Kosovo.

==== South Serbia ====
The centenary of Albania was also celebrated in Preševo and Bujanovac, two municipalities of southern Serbia with substantial Albanian population. The program included a scientific conference about "Albanian national movement in Preševo valley", opening of a museum dedicated to Ridvan Qazimi and numerous political, cultural and sport events. Flags of Albania will be hoisted on the local parliaments buildings, one hundred children will form number 100 with their bodies and local politicians will first hold speeches from the house which is replica of the house in Vlorë in which the independence of Albania was declared. Against the invitation of the president of Albania they will together travel to Tirana to attend central celebration.

== Notes ==
1. A British singer-songwriter and actress whose parents are Albanians from Kosovo.
