= Aqif Pasha Elbasani =

Albanian politician and activist involved in the Albanian National Awakening

Aqif Pashë Elbasani Pashë
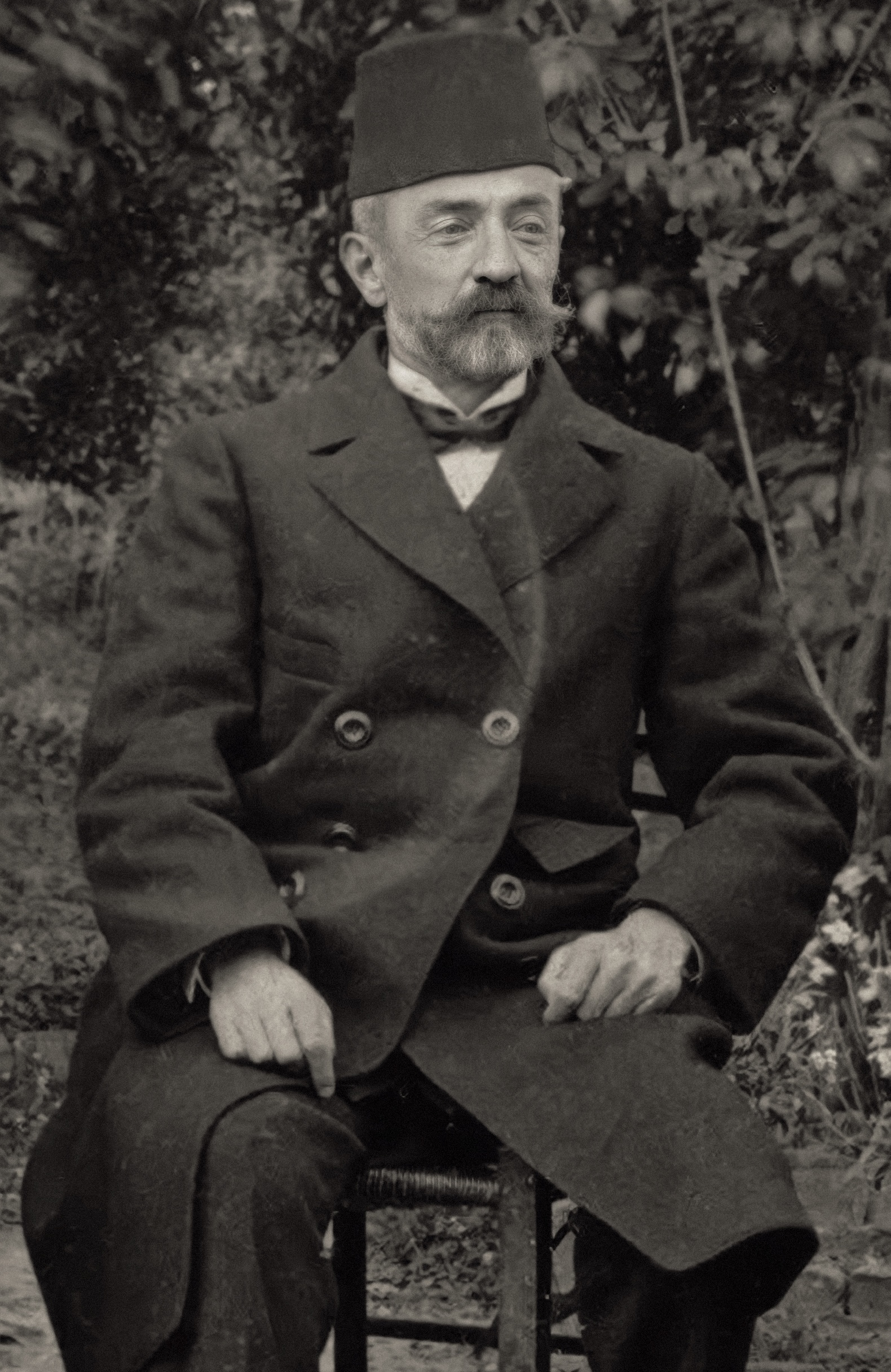
- Born: 1860; Elbasan, Ottoman Empire (modern day Albania)
- Died: 10 February 1926
- Other names: Aqif Pashë Biçaku, Aqif Pashë Biçakçiu
- Occupation: Politician
- Known for: Congress of Lushnje
- Children: Ibrahim Biçakçiu
- Parent(s): Mahmud Pertef Pasha Biçakçiu (Father), Shefikat Hanëm Alizoti (Mother)
- Relatives: Vasfije Alizoti (Aunt), Essad Pasha Toptani, Gani Toptani, Nejre Toptani, Sabushe Toptani, Merushe Toptani (maternal first cousins), Qemal Karaosmani (Cousin)
- Family: Biçakçiu

Aqif Pasha Biçaku mostly known as Aqif Pashë Elbasani (1860 – 10 February 1926) was an Ottoman Albanian political figure in the Sanjak of Elbasan and after the Young Turk Revolution became an activist for the Albanian national cause.

== Life ==
Aqif Pasha was born in 1860, Elbasan, back then Vilayet of Monastir, Ottoman Empire, today central Albania, son of Mahmud Pertef Pasha Biçakçiu, patriarch of one of the three landowning influential and respected families of the town and his mother Shefikat Hanëm Alizoti from the Alizoti family, whose sister was Vafsije Alizoti the mother of Essad pasha Toptani and Gani Toptani which made him the maternal first cousin of Esad Pasha Toptani and Gani Toptani. His surname, derived from Turkish bıçakçı, means "knifesmith" suggesting that was his ancestors' craft/profession (cognate with the Bosniak surname Bičakčić). In his first school years he was taught privately and afterwards he was educated in Istanbul.

He was an activist of the Albanian National Awakening in the Elbasan region. He is remembered for having raised the Albanian flag in Elbasan on 26 November 1912 at the request of Ismail Qemal bey Vlora. In 1913 he was elected Prefect of Elbasan. He supported Qemal in his attempt to form a stable administration and was Minister of the Interior for a brief period in 1914 (28 March - 3 September) during the reign of Prince William of Wied.

After the triumph of the Islamic Revolt in 1914 he left Albania together with Wied. He settled in Bari, Italy, and after a couple of months returned to Albania, settling in Shkodër since going back to Elbasan was impossible. In 1915 he joined a secret nationalist committee founded by Hoxha Kadri Prishtina in Shkodër, together with other patriots as Sotir Peçi, Eshref Frashëri, Ali Shefqet Shkupi, etc. The committee was a precursor of the later Committee for the National Defence of Kosovo.

Following the Montenegrin invasion of Shkodër in 1915, he was arrested and sent to internment for a few months together with Luigj Gurakuqi and Sotir Peçi. Following an Austro-Hungarian offensive, Montenegro capitulated and Biçakçiu and other were set free. As a pro-Austrian he propagandized between Albanians not to oppose the Austrian armies. Biçakçiu took part in an unsuccessful congress in his native Elbasan in 1916 to restore Albanian independence, in cooperation with the Austrian authorities, specifically August Ritter von Kral. Biçakçiu aimed at restoring the Prince Wied and the Principality of Albania. The same Austrian authorities would prohibit such an event.

In this condition, he resigned from any political duty. He was not involved until the Congress of Durrës in December 1918. Despite the desire of participating in the event, Biçakçiu could only send a telegram where he advised aiming at reestablishing the borders of Treaty of London, 1913 as a sign of "neutrality" of the Albania state. At the same time, the telegram positioned him against the pro-Italian spirit of the Durrës Congress which characterized most of the participants.

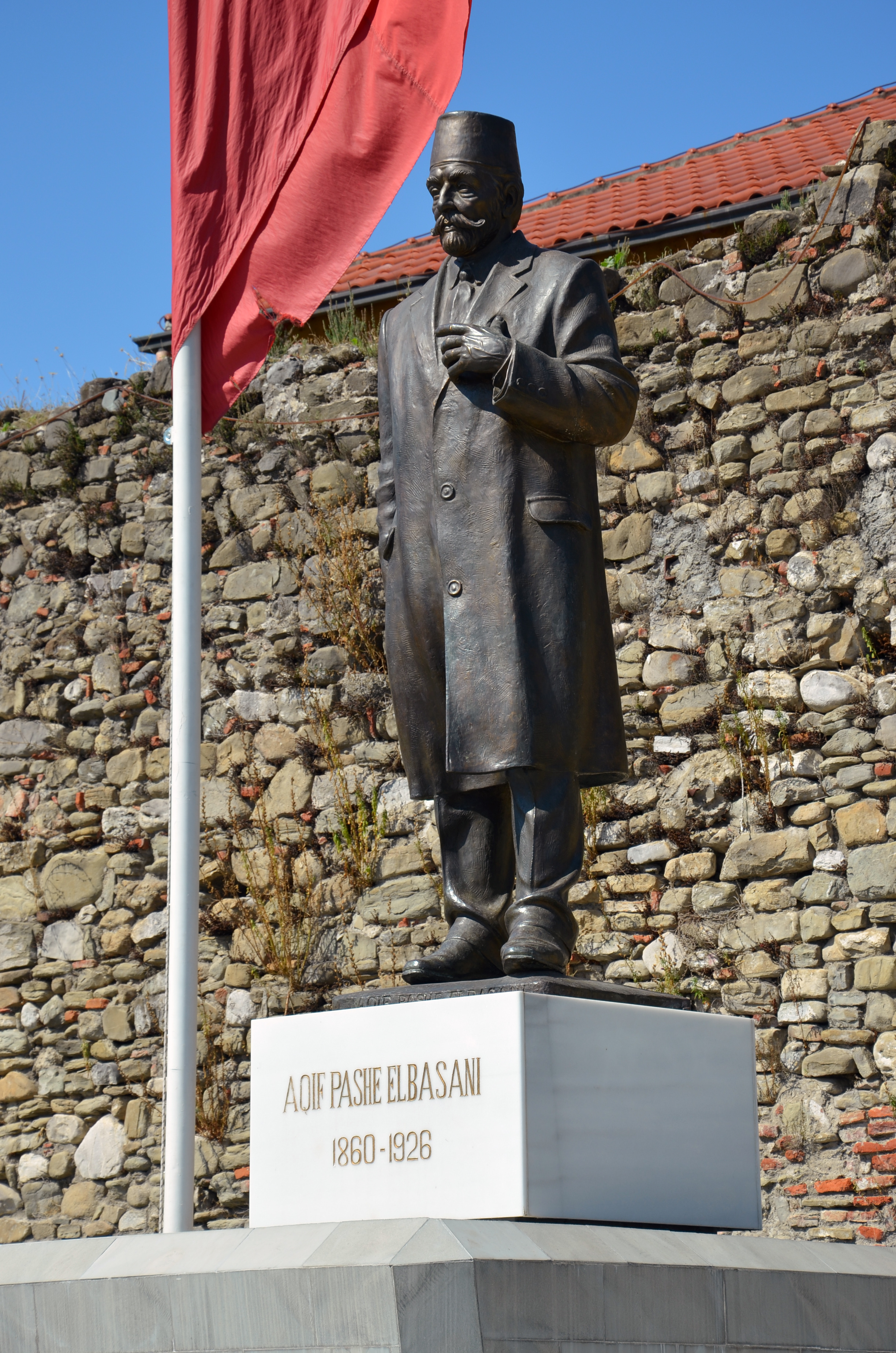
Statue of Aqif Pasha in Elbasan

In 1920, he chaired the Congress of Lushnje and was one of the central figures who rules the Albanian politics of that time, together with Eshref Frashëri and Ahmet Zogu. As a representative of the Bektashi community, he was elected to the four-member High Regency Council (Këshilli i Lartë i Regjencës) that ruled the Principality of Albania after the exile of Prince Wied. Biçakçiu was a foe of Shefqet Vërlaci and had often tenuous relations with Ahmet Zogu. Together with Dom Luigj Bumçi, he took part in a coup d’état in December 1921 and was later relieved of his duties on the High Council by Zogu.

In 1923–1924, Biçaku represented Korça in the Albanian parliament as a member of a pro-Noli democratic opposition. After the suppression of the June Revolution in December 1924 and fall of the Noli government, he went into exile. Sejfi Vllamasi, another political refugee in Vienna would describe him as a "great patriot, but stubborn and insistent till the end".

He married Ifete Hanëm Vrioni of the Vrioni family and had a son with her, Ibrahim Biçakçiu. Ibrahim was a Balli Kombëtar leader and served as Prime Minister of Albania during the period 29 August to 28 November 1944. He was arrested by the Communist authorities after World War II.

In 1962, he was given the "Order for Patriotic Activity of Second Class" by the Albanian government.

After the fall of communism in Albania, a statue of him was placed in a plaza of Elbasan.

== See also ==
- Lef Nosi
- Albanian Declaration of Independence
- Principality of Albania

== Further ==
- Pavarësia e Elbasanit 1912 : (35 firmëtarët) [Independence of Elbasan 1912: (35 signatories)], Hyqmet Kotherja, Tirana, Shtëpi Botimi "2 Lindje, 2 Perëndime", 2012, ISBN 9789995606503
