= Bičanić =

Bičanić is a Croatian surname. The Croatian census of 2011 listed it as the most common surname in Andrijaševci.

Notable people with the name include:

- Miroslav Bičanić, a Croatian footballer
- Damir Bičanić, a Croatian handball player

== See also ==
- Bićanić
- Bičakčić
