= Sonia Bićanić =

English academic, author and translator (1920–2017)

Sonia Wild Bićanić OBE (née Wild, 3 January 1920 – 1 December 2017) was an English academic, author and translator whose numerous publications cover topics in the literature, history and culture of both Great Britain and Croatia.

== Early life and education ==
Bićanić was born in Kenley, Surrey, United Kingdom. She was the daughter of Job Longson Wild, owner of a successful civil engineering company, and his second wife, Hilda Edwards. She attended Roedean School, Brighton, from 1931 to 1938 and then spent a year at Monticello College, Alton, Il., USA. She returned to the UK in 1939 a few weeks before the start of World War II to take up a secretarial post in her father's company.

== Army and academic careers ==
In 1941 she joined the ATS as a volunteer, despite being in a reserved occupation. She worked in the military educational service, eventually becoming ATS Senior Commander (Major) and Education Officer for Eastern and South Eastern Commands.

While organising seminars on politics for the troops she invited the Croatian economist Rudolf Bićanić to lecture on resistance movements. She married him in October, 1945. The couple left immediately for Zagreb.

After the births of her daughter Niki and son Ivo, she resumed her education in Zagreb, studying English and Yugoslav literature at the Faculty of Philosophy. She graduated in 1952 and immediately joined the Department of English Language and Literature. In 1959 she was awarded a doctorate in English literature by Oxford University, where she studied at Somerville College. Up to her retirement in 1992 she published regularly on Croatian and English literary topics, besides teaching various courses on English and American literature. She also worked as a translator and produced textbooks for learning English.

=== Selected publications and translations ===
- Two Lines of Life, Durieux, Croatian P.E.N. Centre, 1999.
- A Social and Cultural History of Britain: 1688–1981, S.W-Bićanić and I. Crawford, Liber, Zagreb, 1982.
- British Travelers In Dalmatia 1757-1935. Plus a little more about Dalmatia today, Fraktura, Zagreb, Croatia, 2006. ISBN 9537052966.
- The Holocaust in Croatia, I. Goldstein and S. Goldstein, translated by S. Bićanić and N. Jovanović, University of Pittsburgh Press, Pittsburgh, PA, USA, 2016. ISBN 0822944510.

== Awards ==
2001: OBE for services to UK-Croatian cultural relations.

== Personal life ==
On the death of her husband Rudolf Bićanić in 1968 she decided to stay in Zagreb to see her children through education. She later married Emilio Pallua, a professor in the Faculty of Law in Zagreb and expert in maritime law. He died in 1989. After his death she continued to visit England but chose to remain resident in Zagreb till her death in 2017. Bićanić died in Zagreb, Croatia on 1 December 2017.
