= Abdi Toptani =

Albanian politician

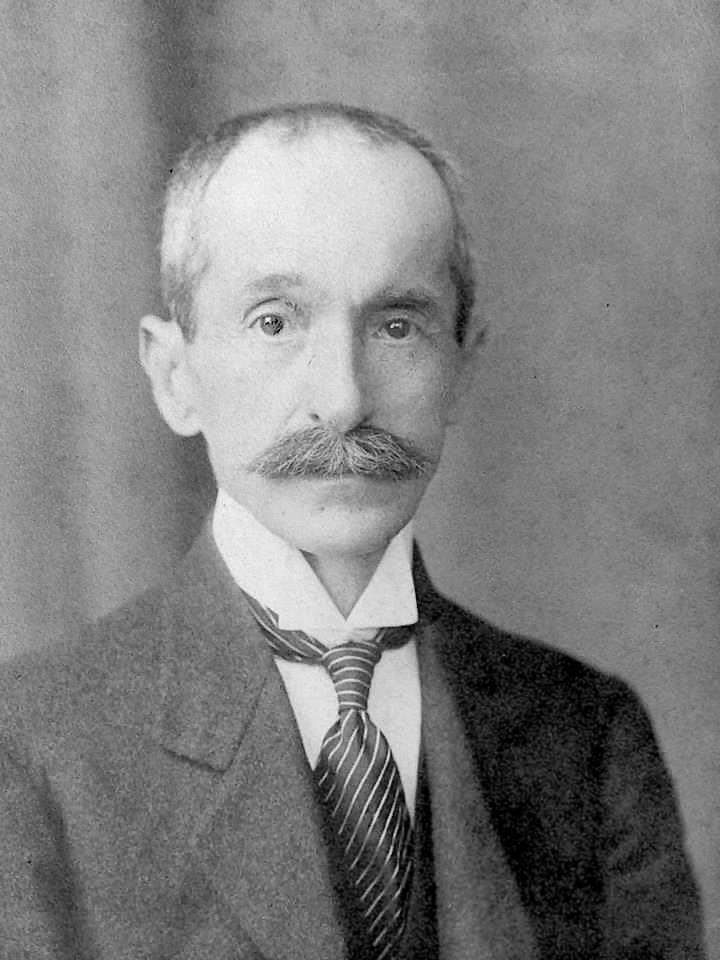

Minister of Finance
- In office 1912–1914

Minister of Agriculture
- In office 28 May 1914 – 3 September 1914

Personal details
- Born: 28 August 1864 Tirana, Ottoman Empire
- Died: 1 August 1942 (aged 77) Tirana, Albania

Abdi Toptani (28 August 1864 – 1 August 1942) was an Albanian politician. He was one of the signatories of the Albanian Declaration of Independence along with his relative Murat. He served as Minister of Finances in the Provisional Government of Albania, and in Prince Wied's cabinet. In the Congress of Lushnjë he became one of the regents of Albania.
