= Murad Toptani =

Albanian artist and poet

Murad bej Toptani
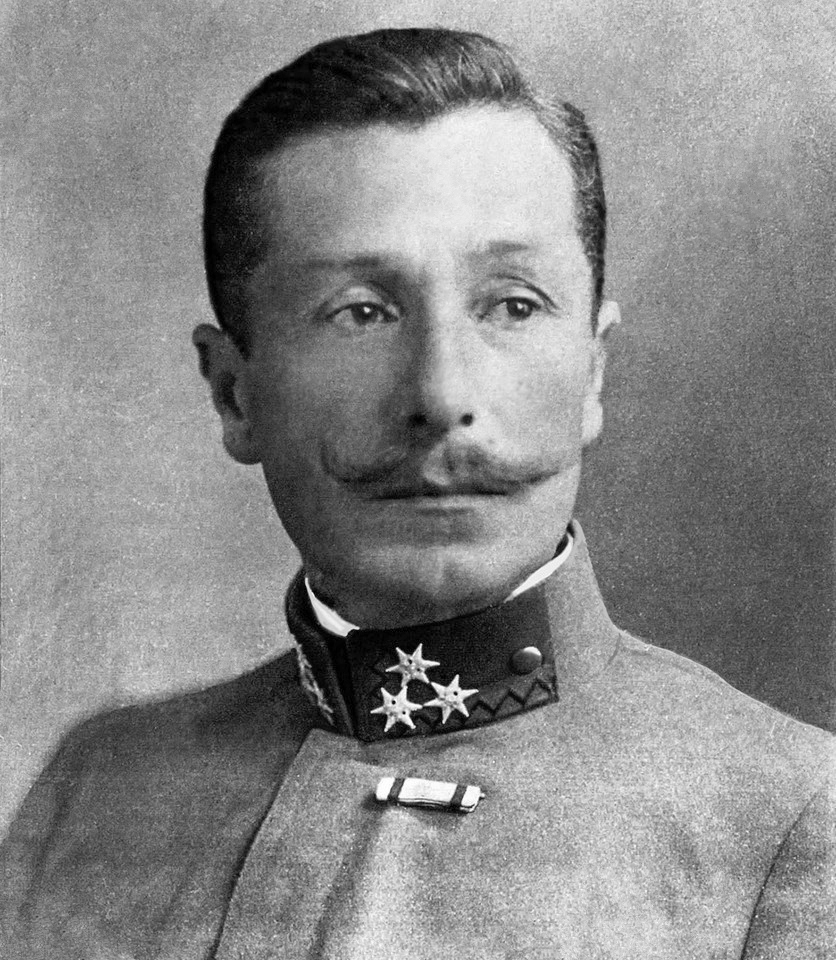
- Toptani, c. 1914-17
- Born: 13 July 1867; Caucasus, Ottoman Empire
- Died: 11 February 1918 (aged 50); Tirana, Albania
- Occupations: Poet, artist and political activist
- Known for: Albanian Declaration of Independence
- Spouse: Asije Frashëri
- Children: Enver Toptani, Sherif Toptani, Ibrahim Toptani (Sons)
- Parent: Seit Toptani (Father)
- Relatives: Refik Toptani (Brother), Vesime Toptani (Sister)
- Family: Toptani

Murad bej Toptani (13 July 1867 – 11 February 1918) was an Albanian poet, artist and activist of the Albanian National Awakening.

Along with his relative Abdi Toptani he became one of the signatories of the Albanian Declaration of Independence in 1912.

As a sculptor, Toptani created the first bust of George Kastrioti Skanderbeg, the national hero of Albania.

== Life ==
=== Family ===
He was born in 1867 in the Caucasus Mountains, where his father Seit Toptani was interned as a political prisoner.

From 1875 to 1881, their family lived in Istanbul, capital of the Ottoman Empire, but they settled again in the Caucasus Mountains, where Seit was again interned because of his membership in the League of Prizren.

In the early 1890, he studied in Istanbul, where he lived in Naim Frashëri's house. There he met his future wife Asije Frashëri, daughter of Sherif Frashëri, younger brother of Naim.

In 1895, he married Asije Frashëri and moved to Tirana, where he later died, age 50–51, in 1918. His three sons were: Enver, Sherif and Ibrahim.

Toptani's younger brother Refik was the head of the local branch of Bashkimi in Tirana. His sister Vesime was married to Mehmet Frashëri, another brother of Naim Frashëri.

=== Exile ===
During 1897, Toptani along with Faik Konica visited the Albanian diaspora in Bucharest and he proposed that Albanian guerilla bands be formed to combat Ottoman, Bulgarian and Greek forces. In Tirana, Toptani was active in the promotion of education in Albanian. In 1897, Toptani successfully requested the instruction of all lessons in Albanian in the newly founded Austrian school of the city. His activities and influence led to his arrest on 28 October 1897 by the Ottoman authorities.

Toptani was exiled and initially interned in Manastir and later in Galipoli, from where he was sent to Tripoli. In 1898, he escaped and migrated to Italy, where he settled in Naples and Brindisi. On 14 July 1898, he protested against his sentence and requested amnesty from the vali of Manastir, but did not receive any reply.

While in Italy, he created the first bust of Skanderbeg, the Albanian national hero. In 1899, he spent a few months in Bucharest and finally returned to Istanbul, where he received amnesty. However, in 1900 he was again interned and held in indefinite detention in Çanakkale and Konya until 1908, when many prisoners were given amnesty.

== Legacy ==
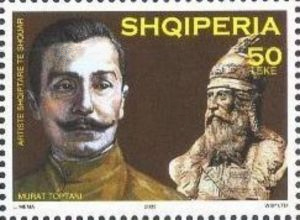
Toptani on a 2003 stamp of Albania

A pedestrian road in the center of Tirana is named after Murat Toptani.

== See also ==
- List of Albanian writers
- List of sculptors
