= Essad Toptani =

Prime Minister of Albania from 1914 to 1916

Essad Pasha Toptani
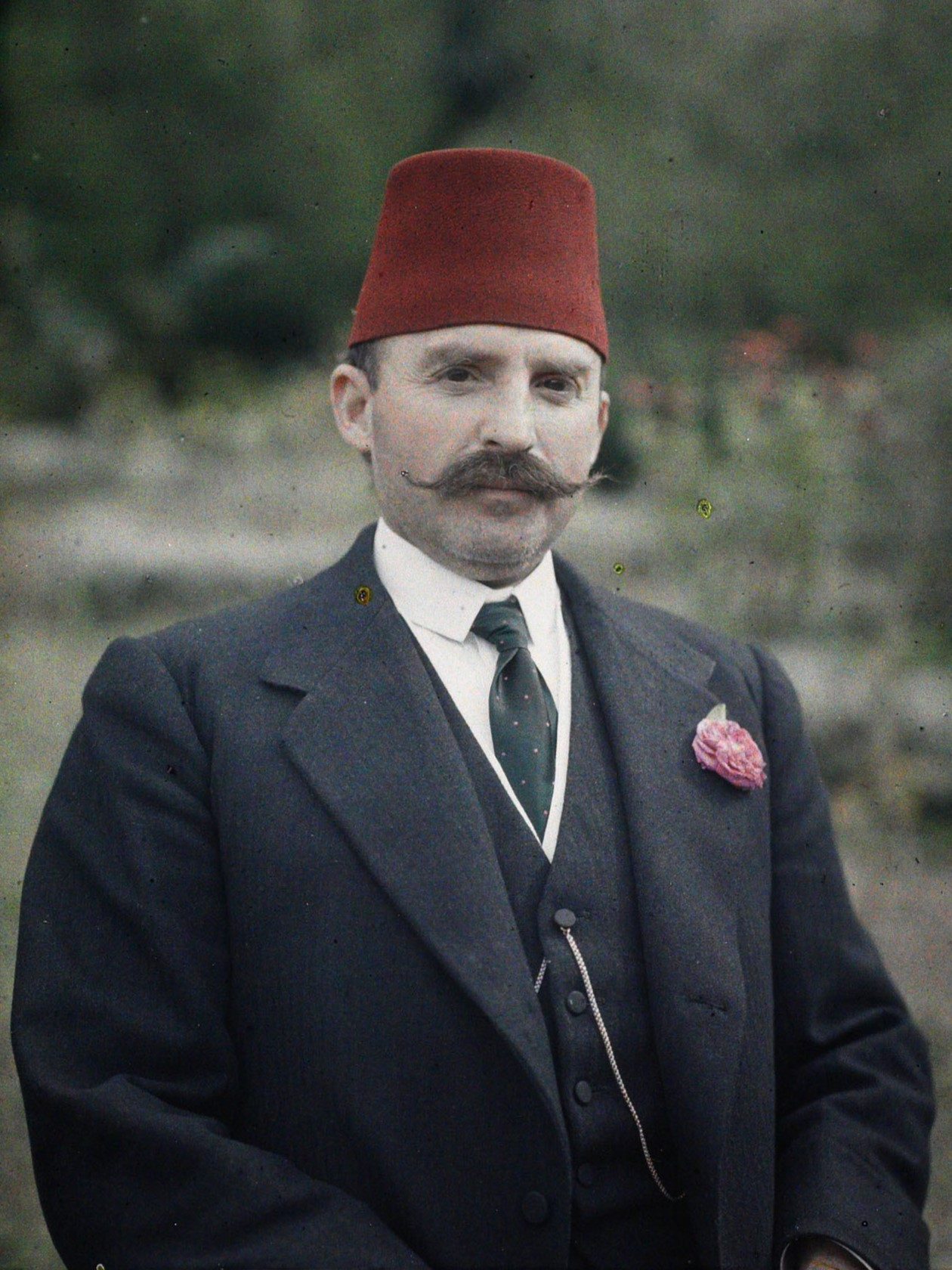
- Autochrome portrait by Auguste Léon, c. 1913

3rd Prime Minister of Albania
- In office 5 October 1914 – 27 January 1916
- Monarch: Wilhelm
- Preceded by: Turhan Përmeti
- Succeeded by: Turhan Përmeti

2nd Minister of Internal Affairs
- In office 14 March 1914 – 20 June 1914
- Monarch: Prince Wilhelm
- Prime Minister: Turhan Përmeti
- Preceded by: Mufid Libohova
- Succeeded by: Hasan Prishtina

2nd Minister of War
- In office 14 March 1914 – 20 June 1914
- Monarch: Prince Wilhelm
- Prime Minister: Turhan Përmeti
- Preceded by: Mehmet Deralla
- Succeeded by: Kara Seit Pasha

Personal details
- Born: 1863/1875 Tirana, Ottoman Empire (modern day Albania)
- Died: 13 June 1920 (aged 44–57) Paris, France
- Cause of death: Assassination
- Relations: Gani Toptani (brother), Nejre Toptani (sister), Sabushe Toptani (sister), Merushe Toptani (sister), Shefikat Hanëm Alizoti (aunt), Aqif Pasha Biçakçiu (first cousin), Ibrahim Biçakçiu (son of first cousin), Sadije Toptani (cousin), Zog I of Albania (cousin), Toptani family, Thopia family (possibly)
- Parent(s): Ali Toptani (father), Vasfije Alizoti (mother)

Military service
- Allegiance: Ottoman Empire; Independent Albania; Principality of Albania; Senate of Central Albania
- Battles/wars: Greco-Turkish War (1897); Albanian revolt of 1912; First Balkan War; Siege of Scutari (1912–1913); World War I in Albania; Austro-Hungarian invasion of Albania

Essad Pasha Toptani (1863/1875 – 13 June 1920) was an Albanian politician who served as the third prime minister of Albania from 1914 to 1916. He previously established the Republic of Central Albania based in Durrës. An Ottoman army officer, he served as the Albanian deputy in the Ottoman Parliament and later cooperated with the Balkan League after the Balkan Wars, including during the Siege of Scutari. As a result, he is regarded as a traitor by many Albanians.

== Biography ==
=== Early life ===
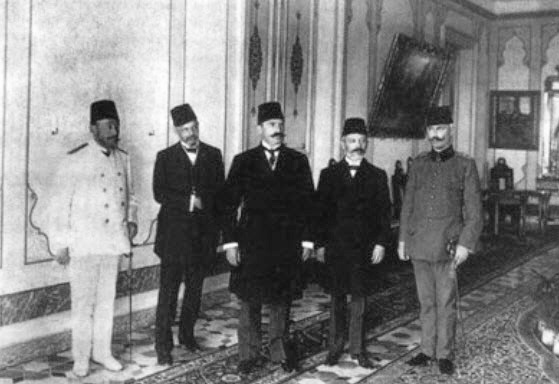
Delegation of the Ottoman Parliament to Sultan Abdul Hamid II. Left to right: Rear Admiral Arif Hikmet Pasha, Emanuel Karasu Efendi, Essad Pasha Toptani, Aram Efendi and Colonel Galip Bey (Pasiner), April 1909.

Essad Toptani was born in 1863 in Tirana, Ottoman Empire (modern Republic of Albania), the son of Ali Toptani and Vasfije Alizoti. He was a member of the Toptani family, a prominent landowning Albanian noble family who helped found the current city of Tirana. From his mother's side of the family, he was first cousins with Aqif Pasha Biçakçiu as both their mothers were sisters. During Ottoman rule, Toptani served as a kaymakam and had command of the gendarmerie in Tirana. In 1908 Janina, he joined the Young Turks and the Ottoman parliament. In the aftermath of the 31 March incident, on 27 April 1909 four CUP members went to inform Sultan Abdul Hamid II (r. 1876–1909) of his dethronement, with Toptani being the main messenger saying "the nation has deposed you". As a result, the focus of the sultan's rage was toward Toptani whom Abdul Hamid II felt had betrayed him. The sultan referred to him as a "wicked man", given that the extended Toptani family had benefited from royal patronage in gaining privileges and key positions in the Ottoman government.

=== First Balkan War ===
Toptani surrendering Shkodra to Montenegrins

In 1912 during the Albanian revolt and aftermath of the Ottoman parliamentary elections, parliamentarians Toptani and Syrja Vlora represented the Albanian side in a parliamentary discussion with the Young Turks. Both called for the cessation of government force and implementation of good governance to alleviate the situation in Albanian lands. Amidst the Albanian Revolt of 1912 Toptani obliged himself to organize the uprising in Central Albania and Mirdita. On 30 January 1913, Hasan Riza Pasha, commander of Shkodër, was ambushed and killed by unknown men disguised as women, thought to be Osman Bali and Mehmet Kavaja, two Albanian officers of Toptani. Toptani has since been accused of being involved in his murder. Riza Pasha wanted to keep up the defense of the besieged city, and after his death Toptani continued his resistance. He turned the fortress of Shkodër over to Montenegro, in April 1913 after a prolonged siege. He hoped to gain Montenegrin support for his rule in central Albania.

In July 1913, he was persuaded by the Vlora family to accept a position of minister of the interior in the provisional government.

=== Peasant Revolt ===
Toptani led a faction of his own in the Peasant Revolt against Prince Wilhelm.

On 19 May 1914, when Toptani refused to lay down his weapons, armed forces under Dutch gendarmerie officer Johan Sluys surrounded and shelled his house in Durrës, forcing him to surrender. He was arrested for conspiracy, though after consultations with Wilhelm, he was not court-martialled but sent to Bari in southern Italy and banned from returning to Albania.

=== Exile and the Treaty of Niš ===
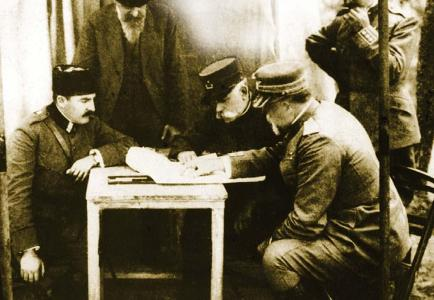
Toptani in Salonika

After the outbreak of the First World War, Toptani travelled to Niš, Kingdom of Serbia, where he and Serbian prime minister Nikola Pašić signed the secret Treaty of Niš on 17 September 1914. With Italian and Serbian financial backing, he established armed forces, Toptani invaded Dibër on 20 September, and by 3 October 1914 he had taken Durrës without a fight. Serbian Prime Minister Nikola Pašić ordered that his followers be aided with money and arms.

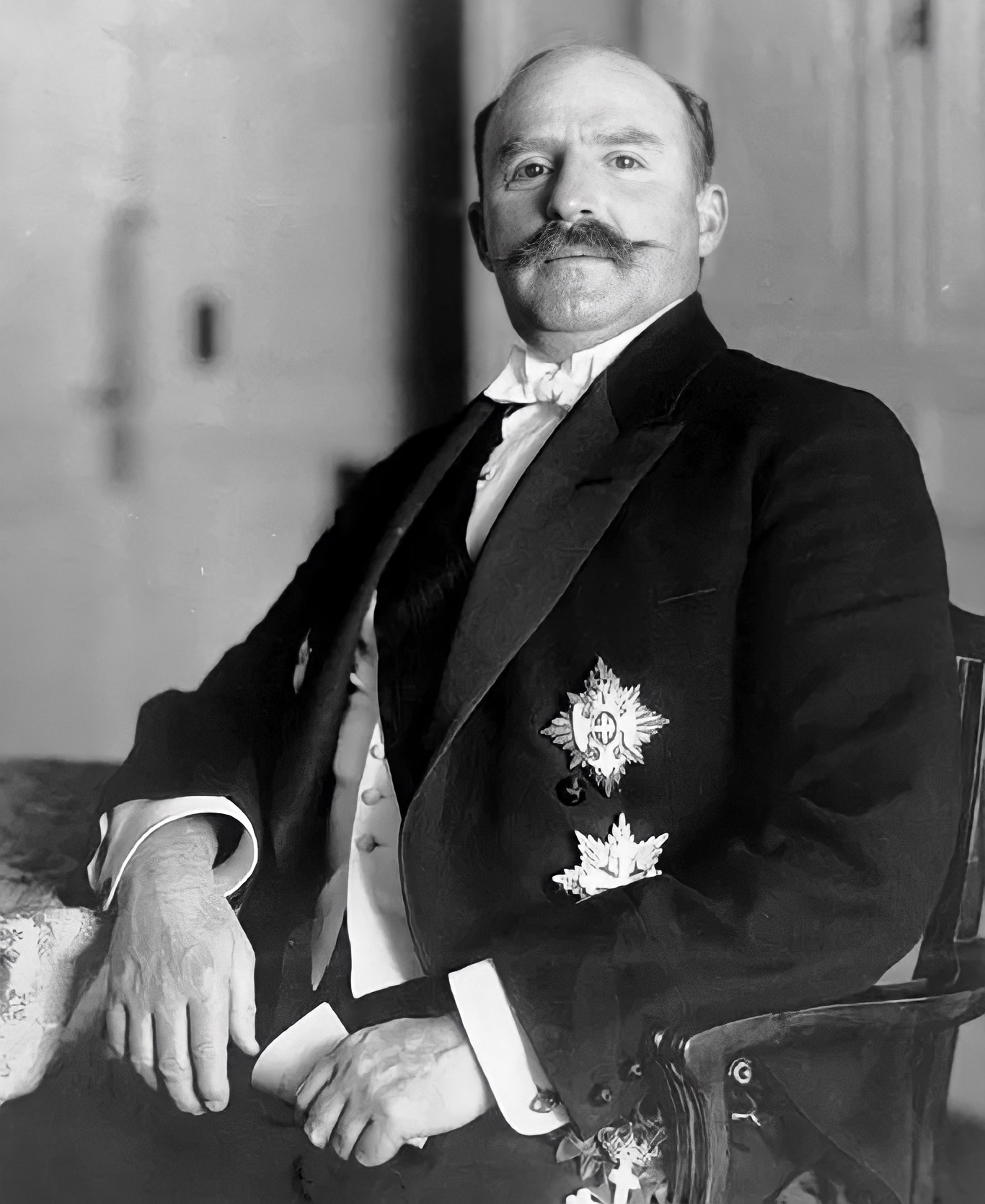
Toptani in London

Toptani's rule was not stable because of the First World War. At the end of 1914, Essad secretly agreed with the Greek government to support the annexation of the southern provinces, known to Greeks as Northern Epirus, to the Kingdom of Greece. During the Serbian army’s retreat through Albania in 1915, troops under Toptani's command gave support and protection to the Serbian column where possible. When Austria-Hungary occupied much of central and northern Albania, Toptani fled to France and later to England and promoted himself as the representative for Albania.

== Death ==
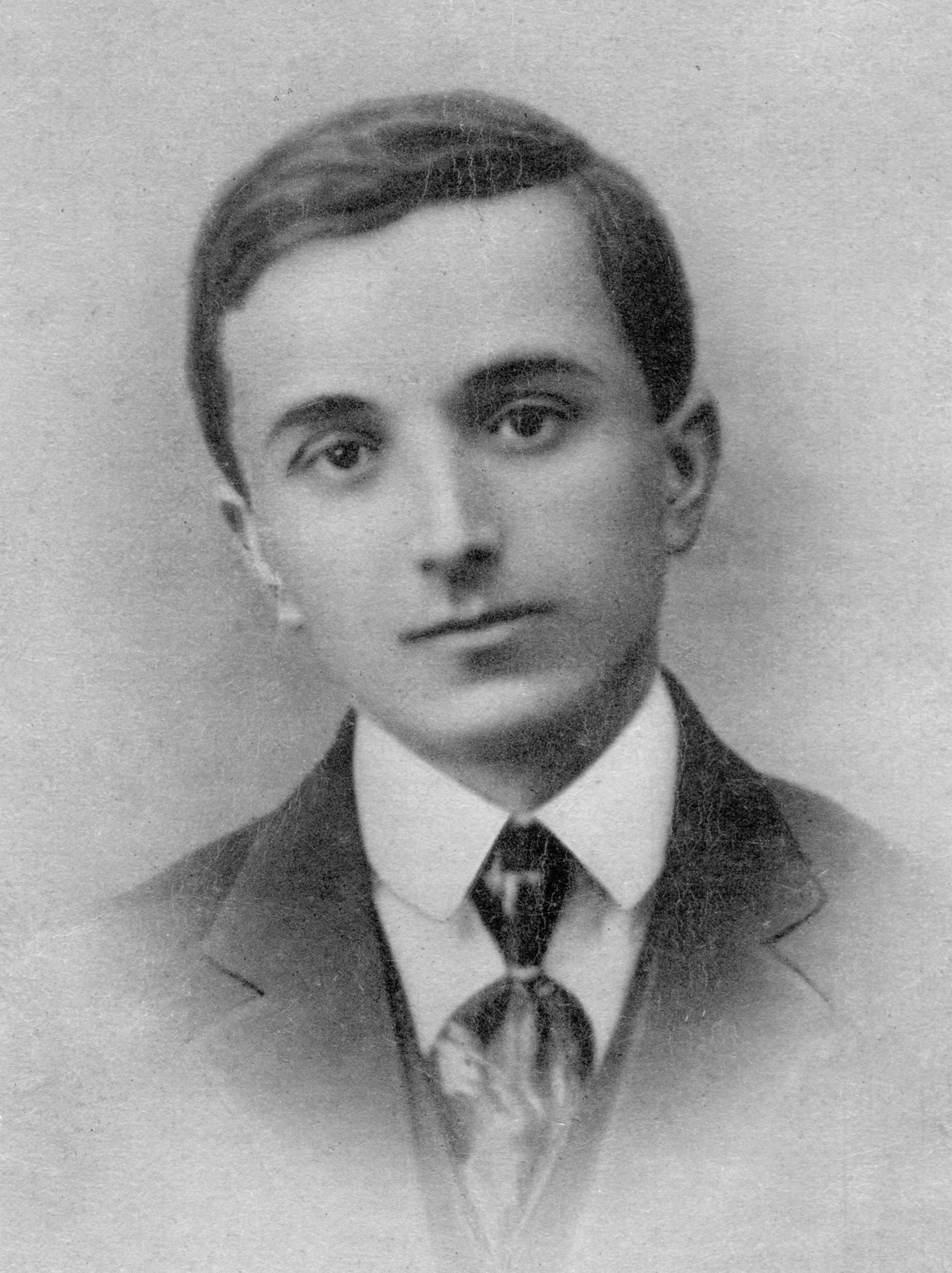
Avni Rustemi

On 13 June 1920, Avni Rustemi shot and killed Toptani in Paris when he left the Hotel Continental. Toptani was buried in the Serbian Military section of the Thiais cemetery in Paris, after staying for a long time unburied in the mortuary.

== Legacy ==
=== Awards ===
For his service in the Greco-Turkish War (1897), the High Porte awarded him with the Order of Osmanieh of 2nd Class and afterwards he was ranked Miralay. Furthermore, for his contribution in the Macedonian front as an ally of the Entente, he was awarded with the title Officier of the Legion of Honour and with the Croix de Guerre. He was awarded Order of the White Eagle. A street in Belgrade's municipality of Voždovac is named Esad Pašina in his honor.

=== Historical ===
Edith Durham described Toptani as "a strange relic of the middle ages ... one with the handsome swashbucklers who sold themselves and their services to the rival monarchs, princelings and dukes in the fifteenth and sixteenth centuries, and cheerfully transferred themselves to the enemy if he offered better pay – men in whom the sense of nationality was not developed at all, and whose sense of honor was, to put it mildly, deficient."

=== Perception ===
Toptani is remembered among Albanians as one of the most negative historical figures and the symbol of treason.

In 2014, the Serbian Minister of Labor, Aleksandar Vulin paid homage at his grave, for his contributions to Serbia.

== In popular culture ==
Toptani's assassination in Paris was covered in the 1983 drama, Two Shots In Paris, directed by Sheri Mita and Pëllumb Kulla.

== Sources ==
- Fjalor enciklopedik shqiptar: N-Zh dhe një shtojcë (in Albanian). Academy of Sciences of Albania. 2009. ISBN 978-9-9956-1032-6.
- Akademia e studimeve albanologjike (2017). Historia e shqiptarëve gjatë shekullit XX. Botime Albanologjike.
- Prifti, Kristaq; Shpuza, Gazmend (2007). Historia e popullit shqiptar: vëllimi i tretë (in Albanian). Toena.
- Patrice Najbor, Histoire de l'Albanie et de sa Maison Royale (5 volumes), JePublie, Paris, 2008, (ISBN 978-2-9532382-0-4).
- Patrice Najbor, la dynastye des Zogu, Textes & Prétextes, Paris, 2002
- Biodata on Essad Pasha by O.S. Pearson, who authored Albania and King Zog (ISBN 1-84511-013-7), 2005.

Government offices
Preceded by Turhan Përmeti	Prime Minister of Albania; 1914 – 1916	Succeeded by Turhan Përmeti
