= Fuad Toptani =

Albanian politician and mayor

Fuad Toptani was an Albanian politician and mayor of Tirana from 1925 through 1927.
He was a delegate in the Albanian Congress of Trieste of 1913.
