= Bičakčić =

Bičakčić (Bosnian pronunciation: [bîtʃaktʃiːtɕ]) is a patronymic surname, commonly found in Bosnia and Herzegovina. It is derived from the Turkish word bıçakçı, meaning "cutler" or "knife-maker". Notable people with the surname include:

- Ermin Bičakčić (born 1990), Bosnian footballer
- Edhem Bičakčić (1884–1941), mayor of Sarajevo (1928–29; 1935–39)
