= Vrioni =

Vrioni (Albanian definite form: Vrioni) is a surname. The Vrioni family is an Albanian family from Vrioni of Berat which was one of the biggest landowners in Albania, most of their lands being in the area around Berat and in the Myzeqe region. They served for several generations as beys of Berat and also held important functions in the Ottoman administration. They are distinguished record in the service of the powerful independent Albanian Pasha in Balkans Ali Pasha Tepelena, in battles in Egypt against Napoleon, and during the Greek War of Independence.

Notable people with the name include:

- Omer Pasha Vrioni, Ottoman Pasha during the Greek Revolution
- Kahreman Pasha Vrioni I, son of Omer Pasha Vrioni, founder of Fier
- Ymer Pasha Vrioni (1839–1928), known as Omar Pasha Vrioni II, co-founder of Fier, politician
- Kahreman Pasha Vrioni II (1889–1955), son of Ymer Pasha Vrioni
- Mehmet Ali Vrioni, member of the Albanian Committee of Janina
- Aziz Pasha Vrioni (1859–1919), Ottoman - Albanian politician
- Iliaz Bey Vrioni (1882 – 1932), Albanian politician
- Hysen Bey Vrioni, Albanian Minister of Justice 1921–1922, 1922–1924, Minister of Foreign Affairs 1925–1928, 1931–1932
- Sami Bey Vrioni (1876–1947), delegate of the Assembly of Vlora, November 28, 1912
- Qemal Bey Vrioni (1885–1946), Albanian politician of 1930s and 1940s.
- Nyzhet Bey Vrioni, Albanian politician of early 20th-century
- Isuf Vrioni (1916 - 2001), Albanian translator, diplomat, Albanian Ambassador to UNESCO
- Dylber Vrioni, Albanian deputy Prime Minister of post-communist era
- Isuf Bey Vrioni, Albanian Bey was executed by Albanian Patriot Rebels of Rrapo Hekali in 1847.
- Giacomo Vrioni, Italian-Albanian footballer

== See also ==
- Vrion (disambiguation)
