= Vokopolë =

- Administrative unit
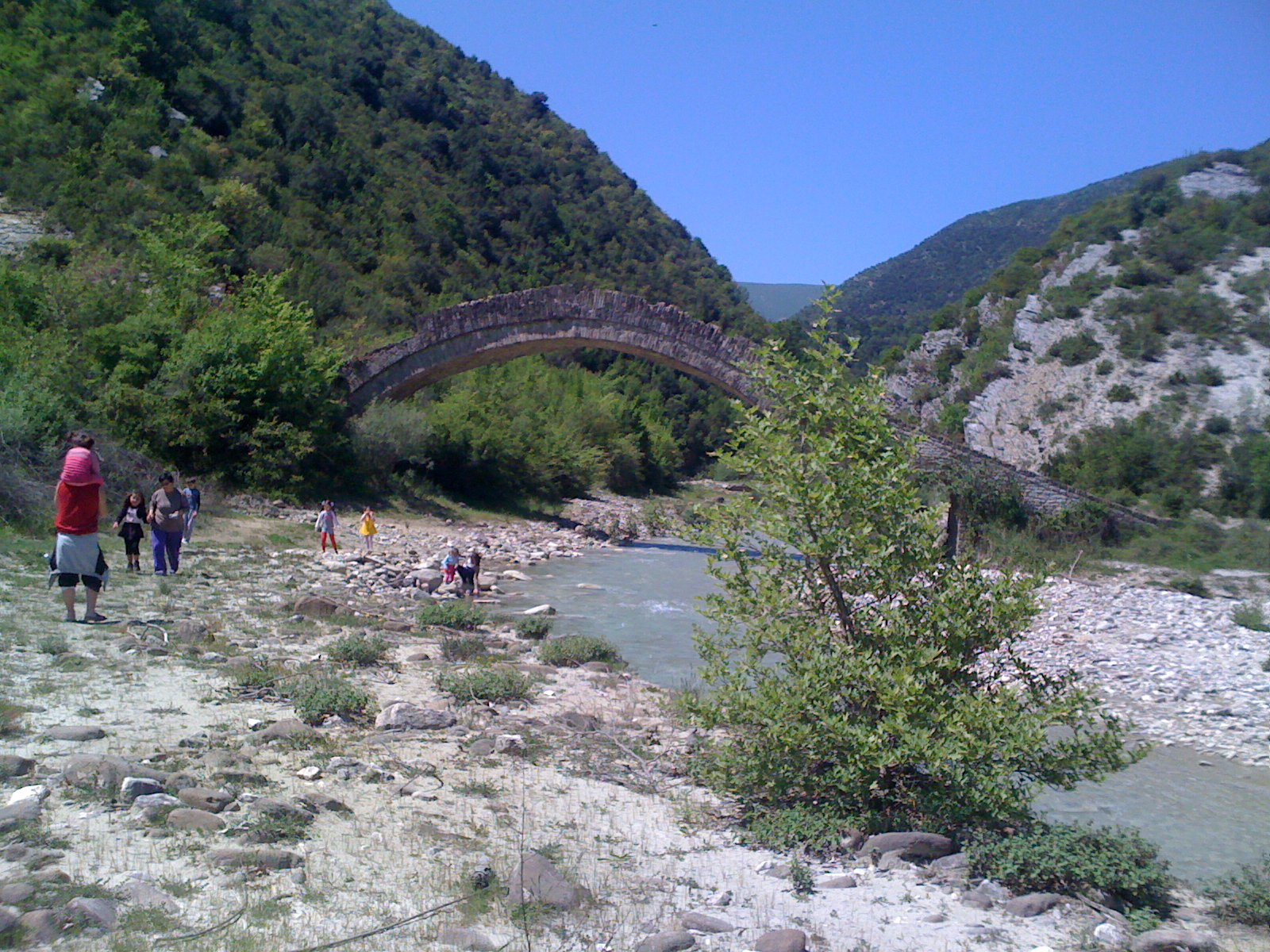
- The bridge in the village of Vokopolë on the Osum river

- Location within Albania
- Coordinates: 40°31′48.87″N 20°04′11.4″E
- Country: Albania
- County: Berat
- Municipality: Berat

Population (2011)
  - Administrative unit: 302
- Time zone: UTC+1 (CET)
  - Summer (DST): UTC+2 (CEST)

Vokopolë (also Vokopola) is a village in the south of Berat County in the Dimal municipality in Albania.

== Geography ==
The village of Vokopola is located 5 km (3.1 mi) south-west of the Vajgurore Bridge and is bordered by the villages of Sqepur, Skrevan, Protoduar, Hallaxhias, and Poshnjë. Vokopola is located in the southern point of the Berat county bordering Gjirokastër County in the Dimal municipality in southern Albania also known as Toskëria.

== Demographics ==
The village and area are entirely ethnically Albanian, with a majority of Eastern Orthodox Christian faith and a notable Muslim minority. The inhabitants speak the Tosk dialect of the Albanian language.

== Etymology ==
The etymology of the name of the village, Vokopolë, comes from Slavic. Voko comes from the word vuk or vuko meaning 'wolf', and pole from the word polje meaning 'field', together suggesting a 'field of wolves'. The word Vukopolje or Vuko polje eventually turned into Vokopolë in the Albanian language. This would translate to Albanian: Fushë ujku. The placename originated between the years 600–1370, when Albania had several periods of Slav rule and Slavic migrations. For example, the Slavic migrations to the Balkans, the First Bulgarian Empire, the Second Bulgarian Empire, and the Serbian Empire, all occurred in this timeframe.

== History ==
Vokopola has a history full of events, but the most remembered is when the Albanian patriot Kostandin Gjorga, the delegate of Ismail Qemali, raised the Albanian flag for the entire area of Berat to declare independence. This is a marked event for the entire area and the city of Berat, which has been celebrated for many years in Vokopolë. Kostandin was not alone in his efforts; he was assisted especially by Fani Shuka, Tili Shuka, Llambi Dheskali, Gori Naska, Gaoi Gjorga, Jovan Plaku, Pilo Aleksi, Leksi Aleksi, and Nasi Pelivani.

Notable Albanians such as Ilias Vrioni and Ferid Vokopola, who were both important Albanian politicians, had their origins in Vokopola and the Vokopola family. Along with the very famous Albanian actor Agim Shuka. Fani Shuka, his uncle helped raise the Albanian flag of independence in Vokopola, which represented the city of Berat, in 1912 with fellow patriot Kostandin Gjorga, who was a delegate of Ismail Qemali, and fellow family member Tili Shuka. Fani also took part in the Vlora war in 1920 against the Italians, killing one, as he lived in Vlore during this time period. Toli Shuka his other uncle opened the first cinema in Kuçovë, now known as "Kinema Kadri Roshi.". Toli was a Partisan in Kuçovë, who was born in Vokopola and died in the Second World War when he was killed by Ballist forces; he became a war hero due to his bravery. A street in Kuçovë named after Toli as a sign of respect from the town.

Kostandin Gjorga was born in 1859 in the village of Vokopolë into a family of patriots. He received his childhood education in Vokopolë. He finished high school in Istanbul with his father, Stefan, who emigrated to Turkey and worked in Istanbul. He continues his higher studies at the Pharmacist Scholarship. During his studies, he got to know other Albanian compatriots who advocated for the cause of the Albanian state, and here he met Ismail Qemali, and he returned to Albania. He opened a pharmacy in Vlora and became an influential person, which made him meet fellow patriot Luigj Gurakuqi. He took part in the raising of the flag on November 28, 1912, in Vlora and took over the raising of the flag in Berat. He goes to Berat on the order of his friend to raise the flag in Berat, but he encounters difficulties from the gendarmerie and returns to his native village of Vokopolë. On November 30, 1912, with the help of the patriots of the surrounding areas and those who followed him, he performed the act of raising the Independence flag.

There has been a hydropower plant in Vokopolë since 2013.

== Notable people ==
Jusuf Vrioni - (16 March 1916 – 1 June 2001) Was an Albanian athlete, translator, diplomat, and Albanian ambassador to UNESCO. The son of Ilias bej Vrioni, his grandmother Hysnije Vokopola of the Vokopola family, came from a local landowning family that had their chifliks in the surroundings of Vokopolë.

Dr. Lluka Heqimi is a well-known doctor, professor, and writer in Albania. He was born in Vokopola to a family native to the region. He has written a book that discusses the history and families of Vokopolë. The book is called "Historiku i Vokopolës, fshati qytezë i Beratit".

Agim Shuka - (April 29, 1942 – May 20, 1992) was a famous Albanian film and stage actor; his father and paternal family all hail from Vokopolë.

Orli Shuka (May 27) is a British-Albanian actor best known for his role as Luan, head of the Albanian mafia in Gangs of London. Son of the famous Albanian actor Agim Shuka, his paternal family all hail from Vokopolë.

Toli Shuka, born in Vokopola opened the first cinema in Kuçovë, now known as "Kinema Kadri Roshi," . Toli was a Partisan in Kuçovë born in Vokopola who died in the Second World War when he was killed by Ballist forces; he became a war hero due to his bravery in the war.

Gjergji Shuka, Albanian academic and writer of the book “30 Kenge Dhe Legjenda Ballkanike”, (30 songs and legends of the Balkans)

=== Independence ===
Ilias bej Vrioni (1 January 1882 – 12 March 1932) was an Albanian politician and landowner. He was one of the signatories of the Albanian Declaration of Independence and served as Prime Minister of Albania three times. His mother Hysnije Vokopola of the Vokopola family, came from a local landowning family that had their chifliks in the surroundings of Vokopolë.

Ferid Vokopola - (18 August 1887 – 28 June 1969) was an Albanian politician, theologist, translator, and delegate of Lushnjë in the Assembly of Vlora held on November 28, 1912, and one of the forty signatories of the Albanian Declaration of Independence. He was born on August 18, 1887, in the village of Vokopolë in Berat, then part of Ottoman Empire to the Vokopola family.

Kostandin Gjorga - (1859) Born in Vokopolë he took part in the raising of the flag on November 28, 1912, in Vlora and took over the raising of the flag in Berat. He goes to Berat on the order of his friend to raise the flag in Berat, but he encounters difficulties from the gendarmerie and returns to his native village of Vokopolë. On November 30, 1912, together with the help of the patriots of the surrounding areas and those who followed him, he performed the act of raising the Independence flag.

Fane Shuka helped raise the Albanian flag of independence in Vokopola, which represented the city of Berat, in 1912 with fellow patriot Kostandin Gjorga, who was a delegate of Ismail Qemali. Fani also took part in the Vlora war in 1920 against the Italians, killing one.

Tili Shuka helped raise the Albanian flag of independence in Vokopola with Fani.

Other patriots who helped raise the Albanian flag of independence in Vokopola were:

- Gori Naska
- Llambi Dheskali
- Leksi Aleksi
- Nasi Pelivani.
- Atë Ikonom Jovan Plaku - also the father of the church in Vokopola at the time
- Pilo Aleksi
- Gaoi Gjorga
- Ndini Gjorga
