= Vrioni family =

Noble family from Albania

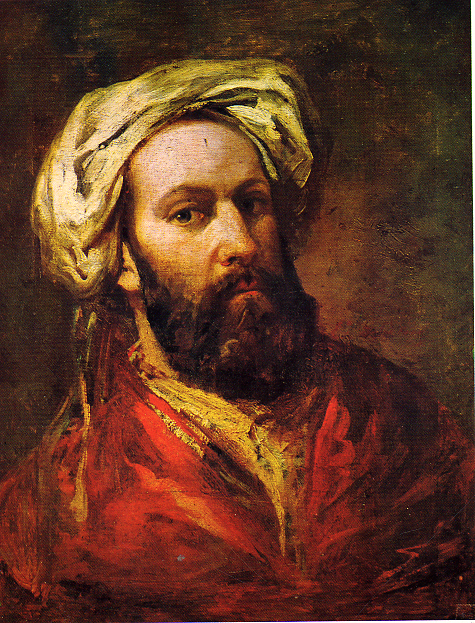
Portrait of Omer Vrioni

The Vrioni (Ottoman Turkish: Viryon Zâdeler) were an aristocratic Albanian family and one of the largest landowners of Albania, otherwise known as "Konaqe" or "Oxhaqe", among which the most important are: Vrioni of Berat and Fier, Vloraj of Vlora, Toptani of Tirana, Biçakçinjtë of Elbasan, Dino of Ioannina and Preveza, Vërlaci of Elbasan, Bushatllinjtë of Shkodra, Këlcyrajt of Këlcyra, Markagjonët of Mirdita, etc. Insignia titles held by members of these families, usually Pasha or Bey, corresponded to the assigned positions in the Ottoman administration, central or local, which are given by ferman or berat (decrees) by the Sultan of the Ottoman Empire.

== History ==
An aristocratic Albanian family, the Vrioni, gained several high governmental positions with the influence of the Ottomans a part of the Vrioni family turned Muslims. In his Journey through Greece, Pouqueville, a former consul general of France near Ali Pasha of Ioannina, mentions one Vrioni predecessor, Omar Pacha Vrioni (the first), as the successor of one of the branches of this dynasty. Aravantinos asserts the same thing also in his Chronography of Epirus. These latter sources show that the Vrioni appeared in Janina Vilayet during the mid-seventeenth century as Timarli Sipahi in the Berati area.

=== Ottoman Empire ===
Since its beginnings the family appears integrated in the Ottoman administration and this tradition continued until the last days of the Ottoman Empire in the Albanian lands. Omer Pasha Vrioni (the first) counted as one of the most famous Ottoman's Empire Generals during the early-nineteenth century, who distinguished himself in the Egyptian battles against Napoleon and in the siege of Messolonghi. However, it is an undeniable fact, that the Vrioni have been among the most prominent Albanian patriots. Their patriotic contribution, often put them in a conflict of interest not only among each other but also with the Sublime Porte, which did not hesitate to exile "the case of Mehmet Ali Pasha Vrioni" and members of the family. The patriotic contribution intensified with Mehmet Ali Pasha Vrioni, who was a member of the Central Committee for the Protection of the Rights of Albanians, Ioannina Committee, Society of Istanbul and eventually Vice President of the League of Prizren in 1878, whose member and was also Omer Pasha Vrioni II.

The sanjak of Berat and the city of Berat were under the dominance of the Vrioni family in the nineteenth century. Monuments in Berat dating to the late Ottoman period from the Vrioni family exist such as the gate to a former palace and a tomb.

=== Albanian declaration of independence ===
Later, Ilias Bey Vrioni and Sami Bey Vrioni were among the signers of the Declaration of Independence of the Albanian State 28 November 1912. In the dark days of World War I, while the Albanian lands were occupied by all sides, Sami Bey Vrioni and Qemal Bey Vrioni, tried to find hope in the Durrës Congress in December 1918, to which they were both delegates, representatives of Berat. Again in 1920, Iliaz Bey Vrioni, former president of the Union association, would lead the delegates of Berat to the Congress of Lushnjes, who included Huseyin Bey Vrioni, which strengthened the foundations of the new Albanian state.

Meanwhile, the Vrioni activity was not only political, but also cultural. Nyzhet Bey Vrioni, a member of the Union association and a delegate to the Congress of Trieste in 1913, also participated as a delegate to the Congress of Monastir in 1908. His work on Albanian followed later by Kahreman Bey Vrioni as a delegate to the Congress of Elbasan in September 1909, which prepared the opening of the Elbasani Normal School, the school for which the Vrioni gave valuable financial and pedagogical contribution. The first Albanian school in Berat was funded primarily by Nyzhet Bey Vrioni and Kahreman Bey Vrioni.

Among the cultural assets that the Vrioni left to the Albanians was the establishment of the city of Fier in 1864. Work started by Omer Pasha Vrioni II with the help of a French architect, whose name could not be maintained in the troubled history of Albania, and continued by his son Kahreman Bey Vrioni.

=== Albanian dictatorship (1945–1949) ===
With the rise to power of the dictatorial regime after World War II, the Vrioni were stigmatized by the ideologues of the "Class conflict" as the symbol of traitors of the nation and class enemies. For four consecutive decades, in all textbooks the Vrioni were portrayed as bloodsuckers and associates of the country's enemies throughout centuries of the Albanian nation, turning so to the ideal enemy of the dictatorial regime.

The dictatorial regime expropriated and nationalized all the Vrioni properties and destroyed much of their cultural heritage, including historic manors in Berat in 1947, of which only the ward where the Berat Conference of May 1944 was held in, was retained. The state executed by hanging and firing squad, or imprisoned and exiled to concentration camps and forced labor camps nearly all members of this family.

In 1946, the remains of Ilias Bey Vrioni, one of the signers of the Declaration of Independence, were exhumed and thrown into the River Osumi. In 1947, Sami Bey Vrioni, another signer of the Declaration of Independence, died under torture. Vrioni Bey Kemal was executed in 1950. In 1947, Izedin Bey Vrioni was beaten to death in the local police station; his remains are still missing. Kahreman Bey Vrioni dies in unclear circumstances during 1955. Nermin Vrioni died homeless and suffering from dementia. Irfan Bey Vrioni was sentenced to life in prison. Yusuf Vrioni was sentenced to 15 years imprisonment.

== Notable family members ==
- Omer Vrioni I – A leading Ottoman figure in the Greek War of Independence. A Tosk Albanian from the village of Vrioni near Berat (hence his name),^{[1]} with a distinguished record in the battles in Egypt against Napoleon
- Omar Pasha Vrioni II – Member of the Albanian League of Prizren 1878, member of the high council of the Regency, founder of the city of Fier (1864)
- Mehmet Ali Pashë Vrioni – Vice president of the League of Prizren, member of the Central Committee for the Protection of the Rights of Albanians, a member of the Committee of Ioannina, a member of the Society of Istanbul
- Ilias Vrioni – Signer of the Declaration of Independence of Albania on 28 November 1912, chairman of the Delegation of Berat in the Congress of Lushnja, chairman of the Union Association
- Sami Vrioni – Signer of the Declaration of Independence of Albania on 28 November 1912, chairman of the Delegation of Berat at the Durrës Congress on 25 December 1918
- Kemal Vrioni – Berati delegate to the Congress of Durrës on 25 December 1918
- Hysen Vrioni – Congressional senator in Lushnja 31 January 1920
- Nyzhet Bej Vrioni (1877–1920) – Delegate to the Congress of Monastir in 1908, delegate to the Congress of Trieste in 1913, member of the Union Association
- Kahreman Pashë Vrioni – Delegate to Congress Elbasan 2–8 September 1909, funded the opening of the Elbasan Pedagogical along with Nyzhet Bey Vrioni and Islam Bey Vrioni, who were among the first of its professors. Opened the first school with Albanian as a language of instruction in Berat along with Nyzhet Bey Vrioni
- Moharram Bey Vrioni – Commander of Egyptian Navy; Governor of Alexandria, Egypt; and Son in Law to Muhammed Ali of Egypt. Namesake of the city of Muharram Bey in Alexandria
- Giacomo Vrioni is a professional footballer who plays as a forward for the New England Revolution and the Albania national football team

== Vrioni in the Albanian Government cabinet ==
- Ilias Vrioni – Prime minister three terms, foreign minister: five terms, plenipotentiary minister of the Kingdom of Albania: two terms, vice-minister of Justice: one term
- Omar Pasha Vrioni II – Member of the High Council of the Regency: 24 December 1921 – 11 March 1922
- Hysen Vrioni – Minister of foreign affairs: two terms, minister of justice: two mandates
- Aziz Vrioni – Minister of public works: one term, minister of finance: one term, minister of agriculture: one term
- Sami Vrioni – Minister of public works: one term, minister of agriculture: one term, minister of the interior: one term
- Kemal Vrioni – Minister of finance: one term
