= Ministry of Public Works (Albania) =

Former government ministry of Albania

- Ministria e Punëve Botore

Department overview
- Formed: 4 December 1912
- Dissolved: 29 January 2002
- Superseding Department: Ministry of Infrastructure and Energy
- Jurisdiction: Council of Ministers
- Status: Dissolved
- Headquarters: Tirana, Albania

The Ministry of Public Works (Albanian: Ministria e Punëve Botore or Ministria e Punëve Publike) was a department of the Albanian government in the early beginnings of the newly formed Albanian State. Established as an institution since the first provisional government of Ismail Qemali, on December 4, 1912, the ministry would play an important role in later governments and continued to function even after the war until it was broken up into several ministries, starting with the Hoxha III Cabinet. Its status would briefly reemerge in 1996 during the Meksi II Government and lasting until 2002. The ministry was tasked with supervising construction projects, the maintenance of roads, bridges, state buildings and general utilities infrastructure. (Note: The title "Substitutive" (gheg albanian: Zavëndësisht), often using the acronym "Zav.", references to the temporary exercise of duty by an official who was not formally appointed by the prime minister but occupied the interim role of the vacant minister. These officials are labeled in the list with an asterisk.)

== Officeholders (1912–1953) ==
No.	Name	Term in office
Ministers of Public Works (1912–1953)
1	Mid'hat Frashëri	4 December 1912	30 March 1913
2	Pandeli Cale	30 March 1913	22 January 1914
3	Prenk Bib Doda (Note: Prenk Bib Doda never served in office.)	14 March 1914	20 May 1914
–	Mid'hat Frashëri	28 May 1914	3 September 1914
4	Aziz Vrioni	5 October 1914	27 January 1916
*	Sami Vrioni (Note: Sami Vrioni served the role of a delegate.)	25 December 1918	29 January 1920
*	Eshref Frashëri (Note: Eshref Frashëri served as director.)	30 January 1920	14 November 1920
5	Mehdi Frashëri	11 July 1921	16 October 1921
6	Zija Dibra	16 October 1921	6 December 1921
7	Koço Tasi	6 December 1921	6 December 1921
8	Haki Tefiku	7 December 1921	12 December 1921
9	Kostaq Paftali	12 December 1921	24 December 1921
10	Spiro Jorgo Koleka	24 December 1921	30 May 1923
11	Sejfi Vllamasi	30 May 1923	25 February 1924
12	Kostaq Kotta	3 March 1924	10 June 1924
13	Qazim Koculi	16 June 1924	24 December 1924
–	Kostaq Kotta	6 January 1925	23 September 1925
14	Musa Juka	28 September 1925	20 October 1927
15	Hil Mosi	16 November 1927	10 May 1928
16	Salih Vuçitërni	11 May 1928	5 March 1930
17	Izet Dibra	16 March 1930	7 December 1932
18	Sandër Saraçi	11 January 1933	18 June 1935
19	Ndoc Naraçi	21 October 1935	7 November 1936
–	Kostaq Kotta	9 November 1936	7 April 1939
*	Yzedin Beshiri (Note: Yzedin Beshiri served as member in charge.)	8 April 1939	12 April 1939
20	Shefqet Vërlaci	12 April 1939	3 December 1941
21	Iljas Agushi	3 December 1941	10 September 1943
22	Musa Gjylbegaj	5 November 1943	28 August 1944
23	Lefter Kosova	6 September 1944	6 September 1944
24	Refat Begolli	6 September 1944	25 October 1944
25	Spiro Koleka	23 October 1944	21 November 1948
26	Abedin Shehu	29 October 1949	8 March 1950
–	Spiro Koleka	8 March 1950	31 July 1953
Ministers of Construction (1944–1994)
1	Bedri Spahiu	23 October 1944	21 March 1946
2	Rrapo Dervishi	5 July 1950	31 July 1953
3	Spiro Koleka	1 August 1953	19 July 1954
4	Josif Pashko	20 July 1954	16 September 1963
5	Shinasi Dragoti	16 September 1963	17 November 1972
6	Rahman Hanku	17 November 1972	23 November 1982
7	Farudin Hoxha	23 November 1982	18 February 1988
8	Ismail Ahmeti	2 February 1989	21 February 1991
9	Leonard Nano	22 February 1991	4 June 1991
10	Emin Musliu	11 June 1991	6 December 1991
11	Luigj Aleksi	18 December 1991	13 April 1992
12	Ilir Manushi	13 April 1992	3 December 1994
Ministers of Public Works (1996–2002)
27	Albert Brojka	11 July 1996	1 March 1997
28	Vasillaq Spaho	11 March 1997	24 July 1997
29	Gaqo Apostoli	25 July 1997	28 September 1998
30	Ingrid Shuli	2 October 1998	25 October 1999
31	Arben Demeti	28 October 1999	8 July 2000
32	Ilir Zela	8 July 2000	9 November 2000
33	Spartak Poçi	9 November 2000	6 September 2001
34	Bashkim Fino	6 September 2001	29 January 2002
