= List of Albanians in the United Kingdom =

This is a list of notable British people of Albanian descent.

== Academia ==
- Andi Hoxhaj – legal scholar and lecturer at King's College London
- Arjan Gjonca – demographer and associate professor at the London School of Economics
- Gëzim Alpion – sociologist and academic at the University of Birmingham
- Lea Ypi – political theorist and professor at the London School of Economics
- Vera Ndreca – academic and lecturer at Cardiff Metropolitan University
- Klement R. Camaj - global migration researcher and lecturer at University of the West of Scotland

== Business and technology ==
- Daniel Nikolla – businessman
- Dean Celaj – entrepreneur and founder of Akademi.al

== Diplomacy and public life ==
- Gjenço Nashi]l – Albanian diplomat and former member of the entourage of King Zog who settled in London after the Second World War
- Ihsan Toptani – Albanian community figure who lived in Britain during the communist period
- Kastriot Berberi – lawyer and Labour politician who served as a councillor in the London Borough of Waltham Forest
- Qazim Kastrati – Albanian community figure in Britain during the period of communist Albania

== Journalism ==
- Anton Logoreci – journalist and broadcaster who worked for the Albanian section of the BBC
- Daut Dauti – journalist, historian and researcher
- Klentiana Mahmutaj – author and academic
- Remzie Sherifi – journalist and community activist
- Viktor Çami – broadcaster who worked for the Albanian-language service of the BBC
- Vudi Xhymshiti – journalist and photojournalist

== Literature ==
- Alma Verija Panajoti – writer and poet based in Britain

== Music and performing arts ==
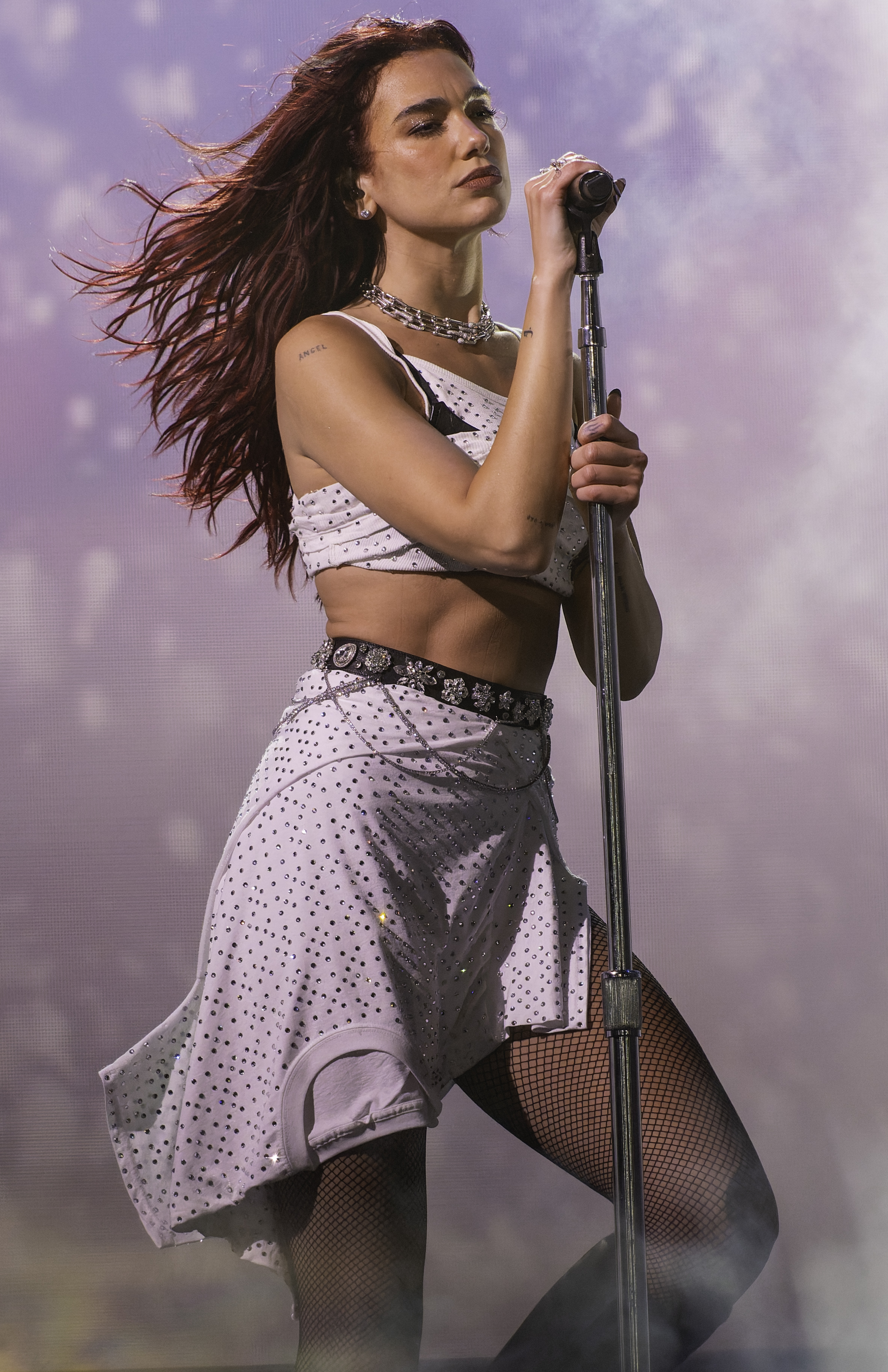
Dua Lipa performing at the 2024 Glastonbury Festival.

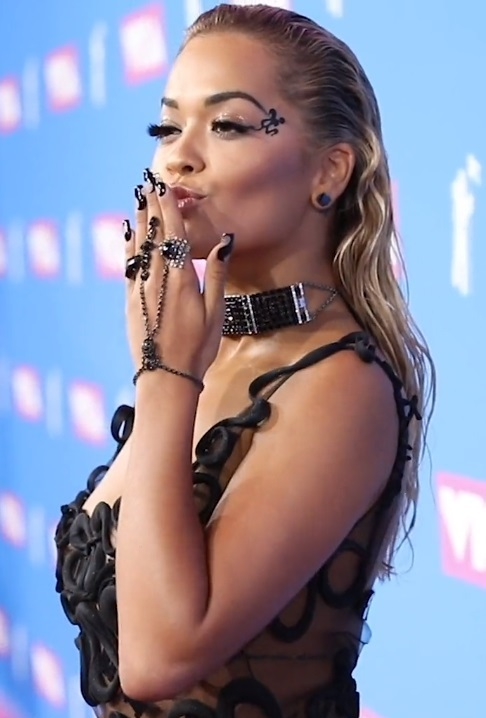
Rita Ora at the 2018 MTV Video Music Awards.

- Akil Mark Koci – composer and professor
- Alda Dizdari – violinist
- Altin Gjoni – guitarist, music producer and session musician
- BM – rapper
- Cozman – rapper and member of Babastars
- DJ Regard – musician
- Dua Lipa – singer and songwriter
- Ermonela Jaho – soprano who has regularly performed at the Royal Opera House in London
- Florian Vlashi – violinist and composer
- Lala Meredith-Vula – artist and photographer
- Mariela Cingo – pianist who moved to London to study at the London College of Music and has pursued a professional career in Britain
- MGEE – rapper
- Miranda Sinani – soprano associated with Scottish Opera and based in Glasgow
- Noizy – rapper and singer
- Rita Ora – singer, songwriter and actress
- Saimir Pirgu – operatic tenor who has performed regularly at the Royal Opera House in London
- Thomas Simaku – composer and professor at the University of York
- Tomorr Kokona – choreographer, creative director and arts consultant based in London
- Vinz – rapper and songwriter

== Cinema and television ==
- Antzela Osmenai – actress
- Arnaldo Stafa – actor
- Fitim DeStena – actor
- Jon Salihi – actor who has appeared in film, television and theatre productions in Britain
- Nebli Basani – actor
- Orli Shuka – actor
- Sokol Cahani – Albanian-British actor based in London

== Sports ==
=== Football ===
- Adrion Pajaziti – footballer
- Alban Bunjaku – footballer
- Anis Mehmeti – footballer
- Armando Broja – footballer
- Armando Dobra – footballer
- Egli Kaja – footballer
- Elizabeta Ejupi – footballer
- Florent Hoti – footballer
- Geraldo Bajrami – footballer
- Kevin Zefi – footballer
- Lorik Cana – Albanian former footballer who played for Sunderland in the Premier League
- Maldini Kacurri – footballer
- Rocco Vata – footballer
- Rudi Vata – Albanian former footballer who played for Celtic and St Johnstone in Scotland
- Zeli Ismail – footballer

=== Other sports ===
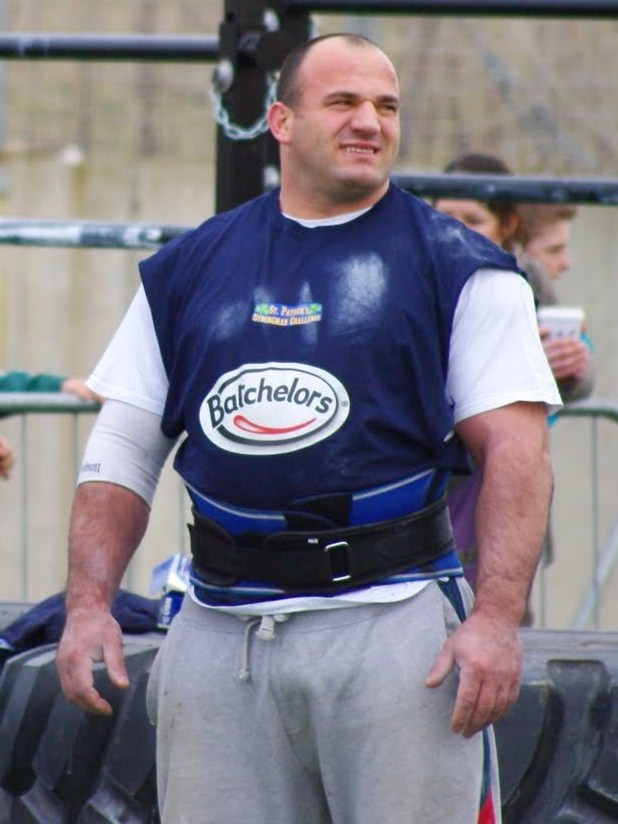
Jimmy Marku, three-time England's Strongest Man

- Adam Maca – boxer
- Eder Kurti – boxer
- Diell Zejnullahu – powerlifter
- Elvisi Dusha – basketball player
- Florian Marku – boxer
- Jimmy Marku – strongman
- Kreshnik Qato – boxer
- Olsi Krasniqi – rugby league player
