= Vrion =

Vrion may refer to:

- Vrion, Berat, a settlement near Berat, in Albania
- Vrion, Sarandë, a settlement near Sarandë in Albania

== See also ==
- Vrioni, a surname (and list of people with the name)
