= Kemal Vrioni =

Albanian politician

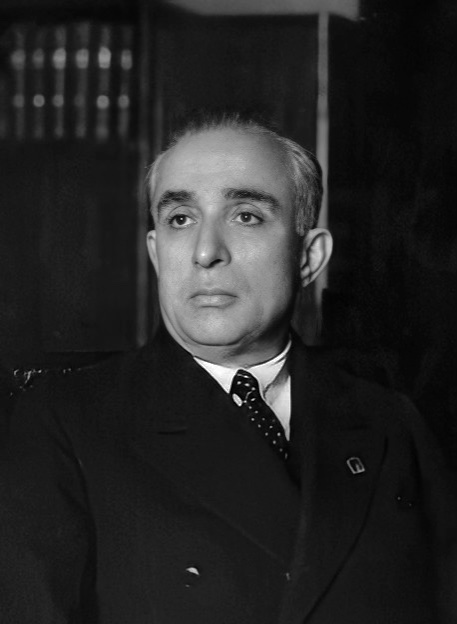
- Born: 1885; Fier, Ottoman Albania
- Died: 1952 (aged 66–67); Burrel prison
- Other names: Qemal bej Vrioni; Qemal Vrioni
- Occupations: Landowner, economist
- Known for: Member of the Vrioni family Congress of Durrës; Fier Revolt of 1935; Minister of Finance of Albania, 1940

Kemal Vrioni (1885–1952) was an Albanian political figure of the 1930s and 1940s.

== Biography ==
Kemal Vrioni was a member of the Vrioni family, a major landowning family from the Ottoman cast. He was the main landowner in the Fier region. Born in Fier in 1885. He studied economics public administration in Istanbul.
Qemal Vrioni was a participant at the Congress of Durrës in December 1918. He was Assemblyman of Albanian Parliament during 1921-1928. He was involved in the anti-Zogist Uprising of Fier in 1935. Unlike other organizers like Costa Chekrezi, Musa Kranja, or Xhevahir Arapi who fled the country or were severely punished, he managed to come out unharmed. In 1938-1939 he was appointed in charge of SITA, an Italian corporation operating in Albania in the field of electrical equipment and infrastructure. He would be replaced later by Salih Bey Vuçitërni.

In 1940, during the Italian Occupation he took over the direction of the Tomorri newspaper, a fascist media which succeeded Fashizmi (Fascism). He was Minister of Finance in the government of Shefqet Vërlaci of 1940 succeeding Fejzi Alizoti.

At the end of World War II he was arrested by the Albanian Partisans, proceeded at the Special Court of Spring 1945 which handled many previous politicians at that time. He was initially sentenced to death as "war criminal" and "enemy of the people", but later the charge was changed to prison time. According to Elsie, he died in Burrel prison in 1946. According to Aliko, he was condemned to 10 years of imprisonment, and released in 1952, being persecuted ever after. All the properties and estates were confiscated.

Vrioni was accused during the 1920s for brutal behavior towards his estates' peasants, including driving them out of his land and burning their homes. He was unsuccessfully brought to court for that.

== See also ==
- Ilias Vrioni
