= Agim Shuke =

Albanian actor (1942–1992)

Agim Shuka
- Born: Agim Kozma Shuka; 29 April 1942; Kuçovë, Albania
- Died: 20 May 1992 (aged 50); Rome, Italy
- Cause of death: Murder
- Resting place: Tirana
- Other name: Ilia - Christian Baptised name
- Occupation: Actor
- Years active: 1966–1992
- Known for: Actor in Albania
- Spouse(s): Fedra (nee Pilika) Shuka, 1975-1992
- Children: Orli Shuka; Iris Shuka
- Parent: (Father) Kozma Koli Nasi Shuka (Mother) - Kristina (nee Leka) Shuka
- Family: Shuka

Agim Shuka (29 April 1942 – May 20, 1992) was an Albanian actor known for playing numerous roles in films and theaters.

== Early life and Family origins ==
Agim Shuka was born in April 1942 in Kuçovë, Albania, which is in the Berat county. He is the child of Kozma Shuka and Kristina Leka and had an older brother, Vasil Shuka (1939–1995). His mother, Kristina, was the daughter of Dhoksani Leka. She was from the Mangalem neighbourhood in Berat. His father, Kozma Shuka, and his paternal family (Shuka), had their origins in Vokopole, a village in Berat. Agim and his family were of the Orthodox Christian faith. Agim can trace his ancestry back to his great-grandfather Nasi Shuka and his grandfather Koli Nasi Shuka. It is said that Nasi Shuka and his brothers, Josif Shuka and Koçi Shuka came to Vokopola from Moscopole, to escape persecution. They chose the village of Vokopola due to the fact the village was Orthodox Christian like the family. His uncle Toli Shuka, opened the first cinema in Kuçovë, now known as "Kinema Kadri Roshi," . Toli was a Partisan from Kuçovë who died in the 2nd World War due to Ballist forces killing him; he became a war hero due to his bravery in the war. Toli gained a street in Kuçovë named after him as a sign of respect from the town. His other uncle, Fani Shuka, helped raise the Albanian flag of independence in Vokopola, which represented the city of Berat, in 1912 with fellow patriot Kostandin Gjorga, who was a delegate of Ismail Qemali, and fellow family member Tili Shuka. Fani also took part in the Vlora war in 1920 against the Italians, killing one, as he lived in Vlore during this time period. Agim lost his father Kozma Shuka at a young age, therefore only growing up with his mother Kristina and brother Vasil mainly throughout his youth. Agim was always passionate about acting and eventually pursued his dreams.

== Education ==
After graduating from the Higher Institute of Arts (today the Academy of Arts), he started working as an actor in the People's Theatre (today the National Theatre) and later as a lecturer at the Higher Institute of Arts (today the Academy of Arts)

His first film role was "Dini" in Oshtimim në bregdet in 1966. Other film roles would continue, such as the role of "Bashkim" in Old Wounds in 1969; "Sandri" in In the Beginning of Summer in 1975; the role of the Albanian Commissioner of the Naval Base in Face to Face; "Musa" in Militant in 1984, etc. His most recent role was as Anila's father in A Boy and A Girl in 1990.

== Personal life and family life ==
He married Fedra Pilika from Korçë on the 27th of July 1975. Her brother was the former footballer and manager Aleko Pilika. Agim then moved to Vlore with Fedra, and had two kids with her. Orli Shuka (1976) and Iris Shuka (1979), the family, moved to Tirana afterwards, where he lived out the rest of his life and amazing acting career.

Agim Shuka died in 1992 due to a brutal attack against him. He did not survive. The police never discovered why these events occurred.

His brother, Vasil, died three years later as a result of gang-related violence involving his son, Ardian.

== Filmography ==
1990—Fletë të bardha .............................Kryetari i Kooperativës

1990—Një djalë edhe një vajzë ...............................Babai i Anilës

1988—Shkëlqimi i përkohëshëm ...............................Trajneri

1988—Treni niset në shtatë pa pesë ........................Doktori

1987—Telefoni i një mëngjesi ...............................Dhimitri

1986—Dy herë mat............................................Shefi i Policisë

1986—Rrethimi i vogël..............................Faiku, Sekretari i Partisë së Rrethit

1985—Të shoh në sy ...............................Zv/Drejtori

1984—Militanti .................................................Musai

1984—Taulanti kërkon një motër ............................Gëzimi

1982—Shi në plazh teatër-komedi.............................Daja

1982—nëntori i dytë ..........................................Jani Minga

1980—Një ndodhi në port .....................................Inxhinieri i laboratorit

1980—Vëllezër dhe shokë .....................................Dania, nallbani i fshatit

1979—Ballë për ballë .....................................Komisari Shqiptar i Bazës

1979—Përtej mureve të gurta ................................Doktor Xhema

1978—I treti .........................................Gëzimi

1978—Vajzat me kordele të kuqe ............................Mësuesi i Historisë

1975—Në fillim të verës .......................................Sandri

1969—Plagë të vjetra ..........................................Bashkimi

1966—Oshëtim në bregdet ...................................Dini
