= Sami Frashëri High School =

Coordinates: 42.6683°N 21.1686°E

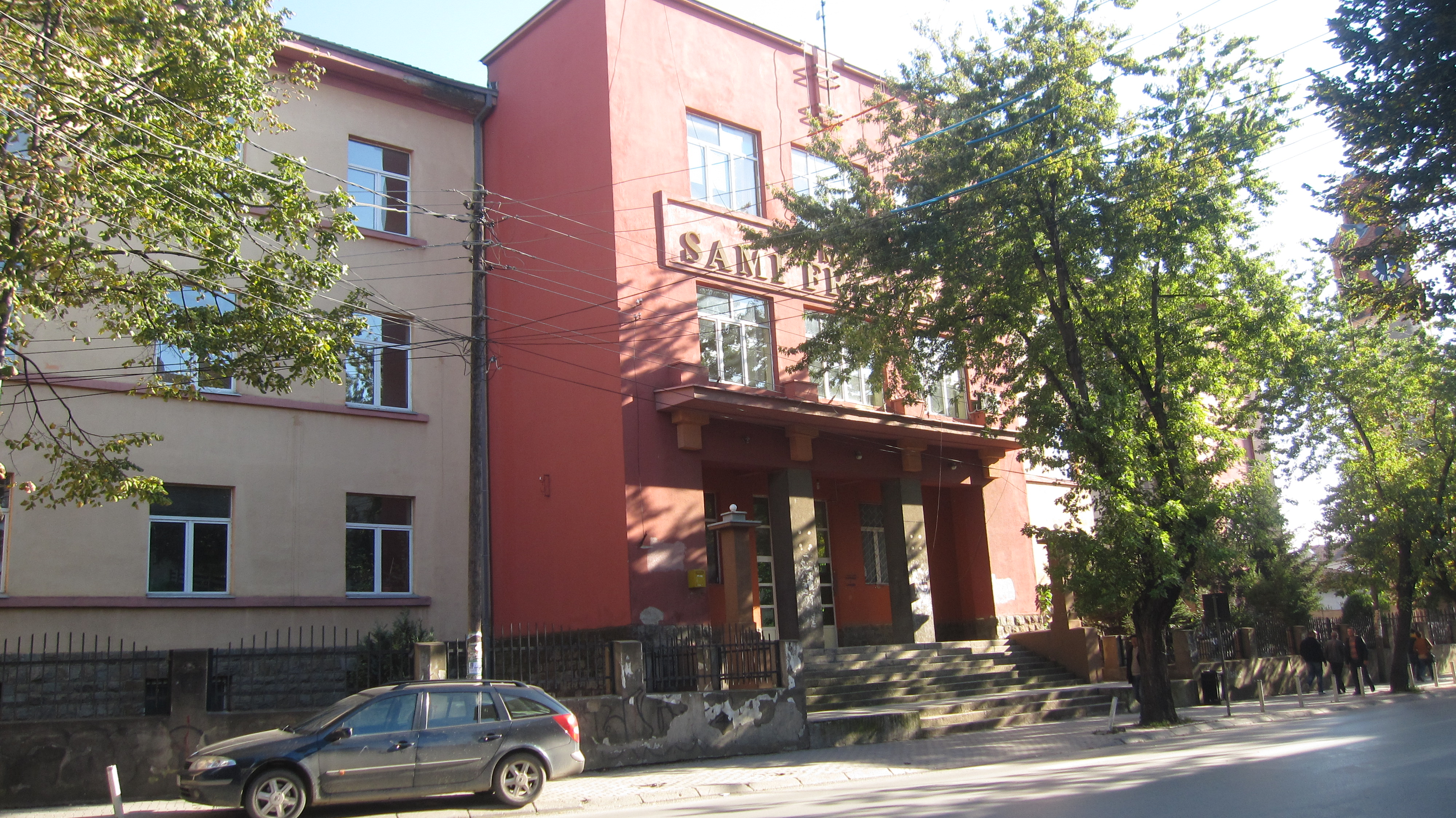
- Pristina, Kosovo

Information
- Type: Public
- Administration: Betim Sylejmani. Principal
- Enrollment: Natural Science Campus; Social Science Campus
- Average class size: 32

Sami Frashëri High School (Albanian: "Gjimnazi Sami Frashëri") is a selective entry gymnasium with two campuses located on the same street in the Qendër neighborhood of Pristina, Kosovo. The school is highly regarded for academics. The school is among the oldest in Prishtina and Kosovo, and it holds the name of the writer, philosopher, playwright and prominent figure of the Albanian Renaissance Movement, Sami Frashëri.

== Organization ==
The "Sami Frashëri" Gymnasium works under the frameworks and curriculum of the MEST of the Republic of Kosovo, and it is one of the most successful gymnasiums in the Balkan Peninsula. Teaching is offered in Albanian and Turkish, with Albanian being the main teaching language. It is one of the most competitive high schools in Kosovo, with annual applications far exceeding the available spots. The alumni of the gymnasium hold important roles in government offices, teaching roles at universities, and in the public scene, making the school one of the most successful of its kind.

The gymnasium offers two distinct pathways: Social Sciences (Albanian: "Shkenca Shoqerore"), housed in the former technical school, and Natural Sciences (Albanian: "Shkenca Natyrore"), located in the original building. It provides instruction in a comprehensive range of subjects including mathematics (Analysis & Algebra), the native language, one to three foreign languages, history, geography, computer science (informatics), the natural sciences (biology, chemistry, physics), history of art, music, philosophy, logic, physical education, and the social sciences (sociology, ethics or religious education, psychology, politics, and economics).

== History ==
Founded in the early 1900s as Kosovo's first Albanian language high school.

=== Pre 1913: As a Turkish Gymnasium ===
"Sami Frashëri" Gymnasium is the first gymnasium teaching in the Albanian language in Kosovo. The school was established at the end of the 19th century to the beginning of the 20th century, during the Ottoman Empire. Although the majority of students and teachers were Albanian, classes were taught in the Turkish language, because the Ottoman power did not allow Albanian language to be taught.

=== 1913–1941: Prishtina Gymnasium under Serb rule ===
In 1912, after the First Balkan War, Kosovo was brought under Serbian rule, and the first Gymnasium of Prishtina was opened in 1913, although this time, in the Serbian language. The Serbian Gymnasium in Prishtina was functioning with a few interruptions until 1941. During this period, most of the faculty were Serbs, whereas there was a mixture in ethnic groups among the students, but mostly Serb students. Classes were taught in Serbian. During these hard times, a number of Albanian students were able to finish the Gymnasium and were able to finish university in Belgrade, Zagreb and other countries.

=== 1941–1945: "Sami Frashëri" Gymnasium, General School ===
In 1941, after Germany and Italy took power over Yugoslavia, Albanians who lived under the Serbian rule, new and better conditions were made for their education. A large part of Kosovo and other Albanian lands, who were under Serbian rule until 1941, joined Albania in an Italian Occupied zone. These places were brought into the jurisdiction of the Albanian government in Tirana. the Ministry of Education, led by Professor Ernest Koliqi, in the summer of 1941, created a project which sought the expansion of Albanian elementary schools through all Albanian lands, whereas in capital cities, the opening of Albanian high schools.

With this framework, Prishtina opened 1 high school with 2 branches: 1. General (Normal) Branch, similar to the General (Normal) School of Elbasan. 2. Liceale (High School) Branch or Gymnasium.

This mixed school opened with the name "Sami Frashëri" and began functioning in 1941 in the Albanian language and was the first school of its kind in Prishtina and Kosovo

=== 1945–1955: Real Albanian Gymnasium & Real Serbian Gymnasium ===
From 1945 to 1955, the gymnasium functioned in 2 languages, Albanian, with the name Real Albanian Gymnasium and Serbian, with the name Real Serbian Gymnasium

=== 1955–1990: "Ivo Lola Ribar" Mixed Gymnasium ===
From 1955, the Gymnasium was established as a mixed gymnasium with the name "Ivo Lola Ribar" Gymnasium. During this period, there was a lot of discrimination against the Albanians, where they were forced to take many classes in the Serbian language. From 1960, the school began giving classes in the Turkish language, whereas from 1978, the school included the reform, Oriented Learning. After the failure of this reform, the school continued as a classical gymnasium, with 2 pathways lasting 4 years.

=== 1989–1999: "Sami Frashëri" Gymnasium ===
From 1990, Albanian students and teachers were forced removal from the school. The gymnasium was continued in the home-school of Mehmet Aliu, where they established the school as "Sami Frashëri"

=== 1999–2007: After the Kosovo War, "Sami Frashëri" Gymnasium ===
After the Kosovo War in 1999, the school continued to operate in the original school building, where classes were taught either in the Albanian language or the Turkish language. "Sami Frashëri" Gymnasium can be seen as a very old school with many traditions, that has made a huge contribution to the education of Albanians in Kosovo.

=== 2007 to present: "Sami Frashëri" Gymnasium ===
The "Sami Frashëri" Gymnasium continues its tradition in many different conditions, but nevertheless the school manages to overcome many different situations as a growing school and among the best gymnasiums in the Balkans.

Today, there are around 107 employees at the school among them, 2 speakers, 1 librarian, 1 secretary, 92 teachers in the Albanian language and 9 teachers in the Turkish language. The school has around 11 maintenance workers.

== Notable alumni ==
- Lyrical Son – rapper
- Rona Nishliu – singer, Eurovision Song Contest 2012 representing Albania, came 5th place
- Capital T – rapper
- Unikkatil – rapper
- Klentiana Mahmutaj – barrister, author, academic and UN mandate holder
- Tringa Hysa – ballet dancer
