= Unikkatil =

Kosovar rapper

Viktor Palokaj
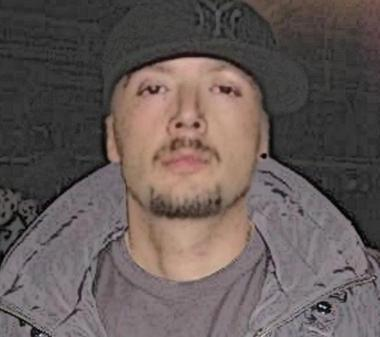

Background information
- Born: 18 March 1981 (age 45); Pristina, Kosovo, Yugoslavia
- Origin: Istog (Gjurakoc) Kosovo
- Genres: Hip-hop, rap
- Occupations: Rapper, singer, songwriter, record producer
- Years active: 1992–present
- Label: CONQUEROR RECORDS
- Members: The Bloody Alboz

Viktor Palokaj (born 18 March 1981), known professionally as Unikkatil (stylized as UniKKatil), is an Albanian rapper, singer, songwriter and record producer. He is one of the earliest Albanian-language rappers and the leader of a group called The Bloody Alboz (TBA).

== Early life ==
Viktor Palokaj was born on 18 March 1981 in Pristina, SAP Kosovo, SFR Yugoslavia (current-day Kosovo). He started his career 12 years later with the song "Zinxhirt qe s'kputen". At the time with the problems in Kosovo, between ethnic Albanians and Serbs, "Radio Selavija" (the only radio station in Kosova at the time) was reluctant to air his song because of the way he was insulting the Serbs on the record. Viktor went to middle school in Pristina and was at the same time a member of the Karate Club named "Studenti". After successfully finishing middle school, he registered in the Sami Frashëri High School. There, he was expelled from school three times. He mentions this in his song "Ni Milion Rrugë".

== Career ==
Palokaj started recording music in Pristina in 1993. Due to family issues, Viktor emigrated with his family in 1996 to the Bronx, New York City, in the United States, where he opened a recording studio called Conqueror Records. After his move to the Bronx, his music started getting shared primarily online, as well as peer-to-peer through internet cafes and CDs rather than any traditional publishing. Palokaj also avoided TV interviews and didn't film music videos.

The CDs featuring his music were part of collections from his group, which he called "The Bloody Alboz" (TBA). Its founding members were Palokaj (Unikkatil), Milot, Presion, ZEF, Klepto, Cyanide, Jeton, NAG and B52.

In 2002, Palokaj published his first album titled Shihemi N'Përkujtime ("See You in the Obituaries"). From 2004 to 2007, he released an album each year: Fjált e Pavdekshme (2004), Prezenton The Bloody Alboz (2005), Armiqt Suprem (2006), and Kanuni i Katilit (2007).

Palokaj held his first concert on 15 July 2012 at Fadil Vokrri Stadium with an attendance of 20,000 to 25,000 people.

He made his first music video appearance as a featured artist in the 2po2 song "Kryt Nalt" in 2016.

== Discography ==
- A Nive (Feat. Klepto)
- Andrra Jem
- Armiqt Suprem (intro)
- Arsyetimi Jem
- Beat
- Belagji Linda Belagji Vdes
- Besnik I Rruges (Feat. Immortel & 2po2)
- Bloody Bloody Alboz
- Caku I Arritur
- Causing Trauma
- Change (Feat. Milot)
- Courage
- Crazy Albanian
- Cubat (Feat. Bloody Alboz, Presioni, V.E.B)
- Dallash Qargash (Me Fjal Te Rana Si Balena)
- Demo 2011
- Demtus (Feat. Presioni & Vz)
- Dikush (Inat Inat) (Feat. Dmc Aka Babloki & Kobra)
- Djali Babes
- Do (Feat. Presioni)
- Dostat E Vërtetë
- Eja Eja Pristine ft.UniKKatiL
- Fantazojn
- Fisin legjendar
- Fat Zi
- Fjalt E Pavdekshme
- Freestyle
- Fryna
- Gatshem Per Pasoja (Feat. Jeton)
- Gatshem Per Pasoja (remix) (Feat. Jeton & Dredha)
- Get Us
- Get Us (English)
- Hajde T'lagi (Feat. Vz, Buja & N.A.G)
- Hey Yo Shqipe
- Hip Hip 101 (remix) (Feat. Presioni & Orginallat)
- If I Die, You Die
- If U Aint Albanian, U Aint Ready For Dis Gangsta Shit
- Intro
- Intro T.B.A
- Jaran (Feat. Hudra Aka Problemi)
- Jepum Ideja
- Jeta S'osht Film
- Jeta Sosht Film (Remix) (Feat. Tee)
- Ju Ha Per S'gjalli (Diss Princ Hysenit)
- Justice
- Kaj (Feat. Pristine)
- Kanuni I Katilit
- Katili
- Kejt Hajvan
- Kile Kile
- Kosova
- Krejt Zemer (Feat. Rameka & Pristine)
- Ku T'meten Shokt (Feat. Jeton)
- Kujdes (Feat. D.m.k & Klepto)
- Kungajt (Feat. Klepto & Vz)
- Kuq E Zi (Feat. Klepto)
- Kur I Ki Met Kejt Tjeter Kah
- Kur Qes Kanun (Feat. Klepto & N.A.G)
- Kurgjo Gratis
- Kush Po Don Fërrk
- Lagjja Per Liri
- Live By The Gun
- Loja Jone
- Ma T'fortit
- Mbret En New York E Leje Me Prishtin (Feat. Benny Blanco)
- Mentaliteti Jem (Feat. DMK & Rameka)
- Mesazh
- Mesazh Per Inat G
- Mos Shaj Mas Shpine (Feat. Jeto)
- Mos Shaj Mas Shpine (Remix)
- Mos T'kisha Njoft
- Mos T'vjen Inati (Feat. B52, N.A.G, Presioni, Klepto, Jeton, Cyanide, Milot & Benny Blanco)
- Na Jena Belagji
- Na Thej (Feat. Jeton, Special-K, Milot, Tee, N.A.G, Vz, B52 & Cyanide)
- Nentori I Tret (Feat. Presioni)
- Neper Cka Do
- New Hit
- Njerzt Harrojn (Ft. Cyanide)
- Nrrot T'soms (version 2) (Feat. Pre$ioni & Jeton)
- Nrrot T'soms
- Old Intro
- On Ur Kneez
- Outro (Armiqt Suprem)
- Pa Mshir (Mutat) (Feat. Nag & Dmk)
- Pak Urti (Feat. Rameka Dredha)
- Pengesa
- Per Mangupa
- Per Vllazni (Feat. N.A.G, Special-K & Jetoni)
- Per Vllazni (remix) (Feat. Barooti & Floetri)
- Për Vllaznit (Feat. Jeton, Cyanide, B52, N.A.G, Vz, Buja & Klepto)
- Perballimi
- Planet
- Po Doni Fam
- Porosia (Gjuj)
- Prishtinali (remix) (Feat. Jeton & Presioni)
- Prishtinalit Numer Njo (Feat. Presioni & Ye-Ton)
- Pse Po Fryna
- Pse Pom Shtin
- Qa Tha
- Qendro (Shpirt N'paqe)
- Qeni Le Mas Miri
- Qonu Kceni (Feat. Presioni)
- Robt E Frikes
- Robt E Frikes (remix)
- Rrasja Box (remix) (Feat. Barooti & Buja)
- Rrenat (Feat. Klepto & B52)
- S'lujna Lojna (Feat. Jeton, Presioni & Klepto)
- S'un Um Prek (Feat. Jeton & Tee)
- Scary Night
- Se S'kom Qare (Feat. Presioni & Benny Blanco)
- Shan Reperat E Vjeter (Mesazh Per Reperat E Ri)
- Shihemi n'Perkujtime
- Shtigjet E Verteta
- Shuj (Feat. Wnc)
- Sjom Me Veten
- Skit (kanuni I Katilit)
- Skit 2 (Kanuni I Katilit)
- Smun Ma Nxen Venin (Diss Double G Army)
- Ta Zhdukim Policin
- Tata Mata
- Tata Mata (demo) (Feat. Cyanide)
- Të Jesh Unikkatil
- Tqoj Pesh
- Unikkatil- Ta zhdukim policin
- Trim I Gjall
- Tu U Kacafyt Me Jet
- U Bo Jeta Monoton (Feat. Cyanide)
- U Don't Get Me
- U Qova Pi Vorri
- Une E Di Kush Jom (Feat. Vz Tba)
- Urdhno Knena
- Urdhno Knena (remix)
- Vdekjen E Sfidoj
- Vdekjen E Sfidoj (remix)
- Veq Edhe Ni Her (Feat. Cyanide)
- Veq Fillimi (Feat. Cyanide & B52)
- Vetbesim
- Vllaznit E Ri
- A pe sheh (Feat.Don Phenom)
- Ni milion rrugë
- Ça Jon (Feat. Klepto)
- Shqiptar (Feat.Mozzik)
- Po Eci
- Ala
- Reja
