= Eurovision Young Dancers 2011 =

International youth dance competition

Date and venue
- Final: 24 June 2011
- Venue: Dance House; Oslo, Norway

Organisation
- Organiser: European Broadcasting Union (EBU)
- Executive supervisor: Vladislav Yakovlev

Production
- Host broadcaster: Norwegian Broadcasting Corporation (NRK)
- Director: Erik Conders
- Executive producer: Arild Erikstad
- Presenter: Erik Solbakken

Participants
- Number of entries: 10
- Debuting countries: Croatia; Kosovo
- Returning countries: Germany; Portugal
- Non-returning countries: Belgium; Cyprus; Czech Republic; Finland; Latvia; Romania; United Kingdom
- Participation map: frameless}} Participating countries Did not qualify to the final round Countries that participated in the past but not in 2011

Vote
- Voting system: Three professional juries choose the top 2 performances, and after the final battle, they choose the winner dancer
- Winning dancers: Norway; Daniel Sarr

Eurovision Young Dancers 2011 was the 12th edition of Eurovision Young Dancers, held on 24 June 2011 at the Dance House in Oslo, Norway, and presented by Erik Solbakken. It was organised by the European Broadcasting Union (EBU) and host broadcaster the Norwegian Broadcasting Corporation (NRK).

Dancers representing ten countries participated in the televised final. Croatia and Kosovo made their début while Germany and Portugal returned. Seven countries that took part in the previous edition decided not to participate. This was the first edition to be successfully held since 2005, following cancellations in 2009 and 2007.

The event was aimed at young dancers aged between 15 and 21, competing in modern dances, be it solo or in couples, as long as they were not professionally engaged.

The winner was Daniel Sarr representing Norway, and Petra Zupančić representing Slovenia was the runner-up.

== Location ==
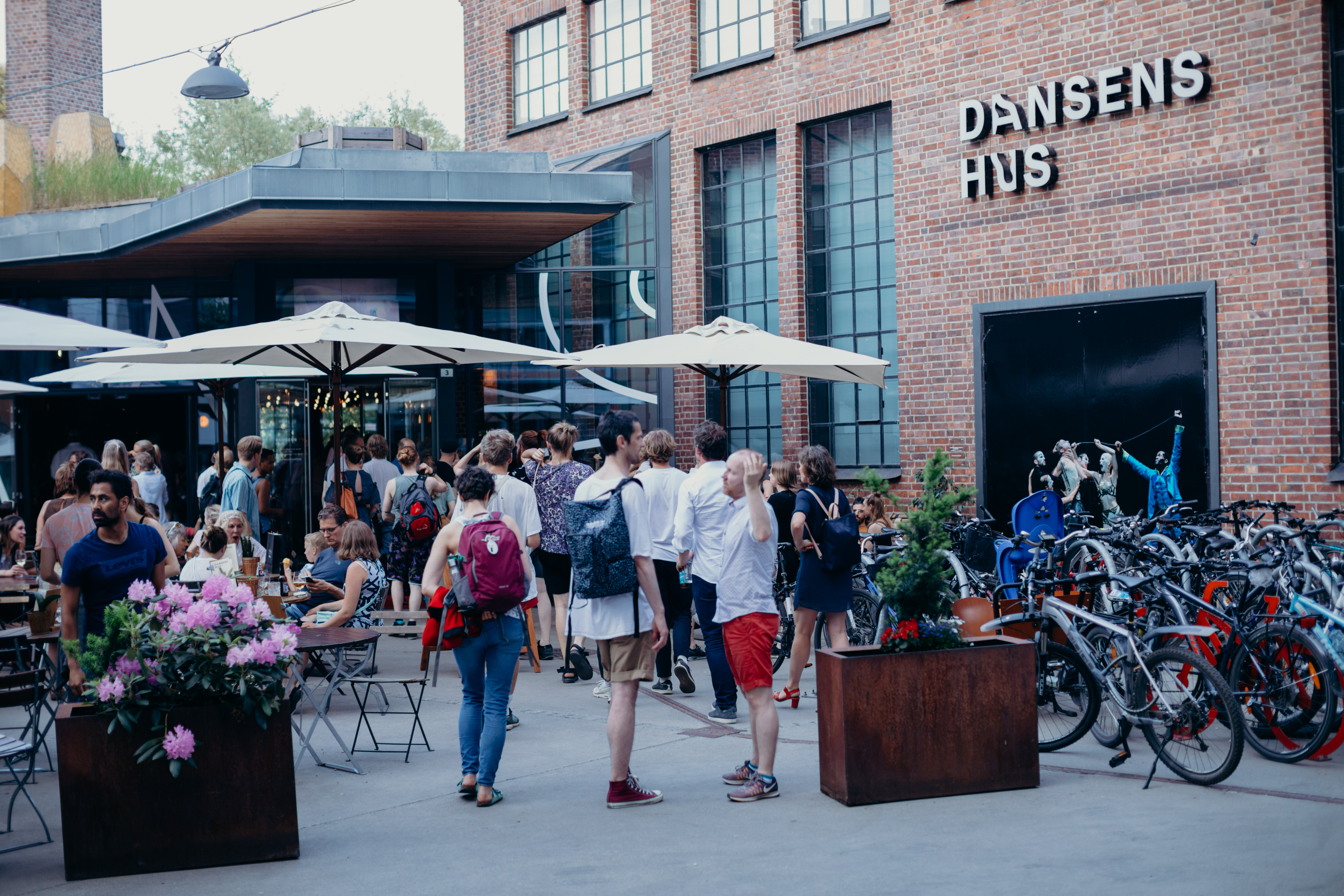
Entrance to Dansens Hus (2018)

Dance House in Oslo, Norway was the host venue for the 2011 edition of Eurovision Young Dancers.

== Format ==
The format was revamped in 2011 to include a 'final duel' round, with the semi-finals removed due to the low number of participating countries. The televised prime time show consists of dancers who are non-professional and between the ages of 16–21, competing in a performance of dance routines of their choice, which they have prepared in advance of the competition. All of the acts then take part in a choreographed group dance during 'Young Dancers Week'.

=== Presenters ===
Erik Solbakken was the host of the 2011 contest. Solbakken previously hosted the Eurovision Song Contest 2010 in Oslo, alongside Haddy Jatou N'jie and Nadia Hasnaoui.

== Jury panel ==
Jury members of a professional aspect and representing the elements of ballet, contemporary, and modern dancing styles, score each of the competing individual and group dance routines. Once all the jury votes have been counted, the two participants which received the highest total of points progress to a final round. The final round consists of a 90-second 'dual', were each of the finalists perform a 45-second random dance-off routine. The overall winner upon completion of the final dances is chosen by the professional jury members.

The jury members consisted of the following:

- USA – Michael Nunn
- United Kingdom – William Trevitt
- Sweden – Fredrik Rydman
- Russia – Ilze Liepa

== Participants and results ==
=== Results ===
R/O	Country	Broadcaster	Dancer(s)	Dance	Choreographer	Result
1	Sweden	SVT	Louise Lind	Oya	Mauro Rojas	—N/a
2	Croatia	HRT	Grigor Bazdar	Under the Skin	Valentina Ivankovic Pelikan	—N/a
3	Germany	WDR	Joy Kammin	Change Your Levels	Joy Kammin & Erika Winkler	—N/a
4	Norway	NRK	Daniel Sarr	Full Force	Daniel Sarr & Maria Karlsen	Advanced
5	Kosovo	RTK	Tringa Hysa	Rebirth	Rudina Berdynaj	—N/a
6	Netherlands	NTR	Floor Eimers	Dutch Breeze	Floor Eimers	—N/a
7	Poland	TVP	Adam Myslinski	Mania - C	Katarzyna Kmiec	—N/a
8	Slovenia	RTVSLO	Petra Zupančić	On the Edge	Mitja Popovski	Advanced
9	Portugal	RTP	Ricardo Macedo	Todos Os Ais São Meus	Catarina Moreira	—N/a
10	Greece	ERT	Spiridoula Magouritsa	Ultima Carta	Katerina Sarri	—N/a

==== Final duel ====
Country	Participant	Jury member votes				Result
Country	Participant	I. Liepa	W. Trevitt	M. Nunn	F. Rydman	Result
Norway	Daniel Sarr		X	X	X	Winner
Slovenia	Petra Zupančić	X				Runner Up

== Broadcasting ==
The contest was broadcast by the following broadcasters:

Date of broadcast	Country	Station
24 June 2011	Greece	ERT1
24 June 2011	Kosovo	RTK 1
24 June 2011	Norway	NRK1
24 June 2011	Poland	TVP Kultura
25 June 2011	Portugal	RTP1
25 June 2011	Sweden	SVT2
2 July 2011	Slovenia	TV SLO 2
3 July 2011	Netherlands	NTR2
9 July 2011	Croatia	HRT 2
10 July 2011	Germany	WDR Fernsehen

== See also ==
- Eurovision Song Contest 2011
- Junior Eurovision Song Contest 2011
