= Ferid Vokopola =

Albanian politician (1887–1969)

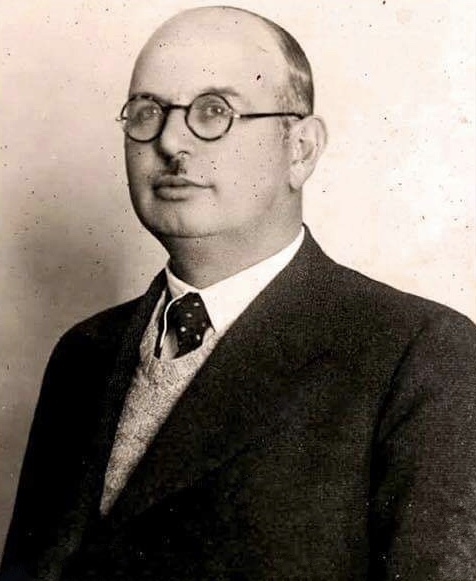
- Born: 18 August 1887; Vokopole, Vilayet of Janina, Ottoman Empire (modern day Albania)
- Died: 28 June 1969 (aged 81); Durrës, Albania
- Relatives: Ilias Vrioni (cousin), Jusuf Vrioni (cousin), Hysnije Vokopola (cousin)
- Family: Vokopola

Ferid Vokopola (18 August 1887 – 28 June 1969) was an Albanian politician, theologist, translator and delegate of Lushnjë in the Assembly of Vlora held on 28 November 1912, and one of the 40 signatories of the Albanian Declaration of Independence.

== Life ==
He was born on August 18, 1887, in the village of Vokopole in the southern part of Berat County now known as the Dimal municipality, then part of the Ottoman Empire. Born into the Vokopola family with the same name as their place of origin, this makes Ferid a relative to Ilias Vrioni (and his son Jusuf Vrioni) who maternally is from Vokopole and the Vokopola family, his mother's name being Hysnije Vokopola. The Vokopola family were landowners that had their chifliks in the surroundings of Vokopolë. In the early 19th century, his family moved to the city of Berat, where he completed his elementary schooling. He completed high school in Istanbul, where he later also completed his university studies in law and economics. After finishing school, he returned to Berat and lived for several years in the city, where he served as a lawyer. In November 1912, he was elected delegate of Lushnjë in the National Assembly of Vlora, and he was the youngest among all participants. He signed the Declaration of Independence with the initials "M. Ferit Vokopola". He was among the signatories of Independence and a delegate of Vlora.

In 1920, he was one of the organizers of the Congress of Lushnjë. He was among the founders of the Madrasah of Tirana and a collaborator with the secular and religious press. He was the first to translate the Quran from English into Albanian. In 1914, he was Minister of Agriculture. During this time, he developed the rules for the translation of the Quran. He was a prominent representative of Islamic Mysticism in Albania in the first half of the 20th century, and was ranked as one of the most important Albanian scholars specializing in Persian studies. He was a well-known figure in his time. In 192–1928, he was elected Member of Parliament of Vlora, and during the years 192–1939, he was Member of Parliament of Berat. He was the fifth secretary of the Congress of Lushnjë. He wrote to the members of Congress. He was a very successful politician, economist, theologian, poet, philosopher, and essayist.
