= Tringa Hysa =

Albanian ballet dancer

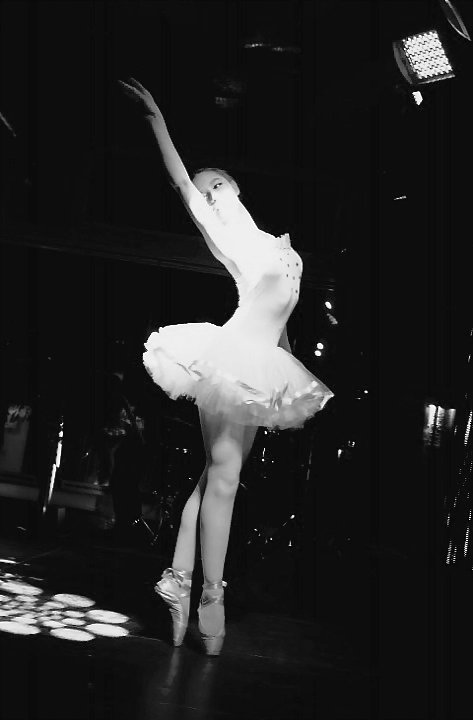
- Born: January 8, 1996 (age 30); Pristina, FR Yugoslavia (present-day Kosovo)
- Citizenship: Kosovo
- Occupations: Dancer, ballerina
- Years active: 2005–present
- Known for: Representing Kosovo, Eurovision Young Dancers 2011

Tringa Hysa (Albanian pronunciation: [ˈtriŋɡa ˈhysa], born 8 January 1996 in Pristina, Kosovo) is a Kosovo-Albanian ballet dancer. In 2011, she represented Kosovo in the Eurovision Young Dancers, held in Oslo, Norway. Her dancing experience started in 2005 when she became a part of "Studio Rudina", a Ballet Course in Pristina.

== Early life and career ==
Tringa Hysa was born in Pristina, Kosovo (then part of FR Yugoslavia). She studied at the Sami Frashëri High School in her home town, and was later selected by the Radio Television of Kosovo to represent Kosovo in the Eurovision Young Dancers 2011 in Oslo, Norway. The selection was done throughout audition. There were 17 participants from all over Kosovo. The professional jury from Kosovo broadcaster RTK selected Hysa and Patrisa Pruthi. Later on the EYD commission decided to take the first dancer to represent Kosovo at the 2011 edition of the Eurovision Young Dancers Competition 2011.

Hysa's appearances in television started in 2005 as well, her first appearance in television was in three public televisions of Kosovo Radio Television of Kosovo, Kohavision, and RTV21, where she took part in the New Year's Eve Show. In 2006 and 2007 she took part in American Chamber and Raiffeisen Bank humanitarian evening, where Tringa was the leading ballerina of choreographic act.

In 2007 she was part of the major ballet play "Në ëndërra" (In Dreams), a production by Studio Rudina. In 2008 she was a guest of "Kosovo Vision", also in the late 2008 she was part of "Magic Show", a festive programme on Kohavision, in that period she was part of "Të qeshim së bashku (Let's Laugh together), a festive programme on Radio Television of Kosovo. Her other appearances on television were "Pylli i princeshave" (The Princesses Forest), "Pa Rrotlla", etc.

== Plays ==
- Mbretëresha e zanave - (Fairy's Queen)
- Vdekja e mjellmës - (The Swan's Death)
- Shtriga - (The Witch)
- Zana e bardhë - (The White Fairy)

=== Other plays as soloist ===
- Muzat - (Muses)
- Kapelet - (Hats)
- Planetet - (Planets)
- Finalja 1 - (Final 1)
- Djallushet - (She devils)
- Vallezimi i princeshave - (Dance of princesses)
- CAN - (CAN)
- Cigania - (Gypsy girl)
- Zhizeli
- Fortuna
- Maskat (Masks)
- Finalja 2 (Final 2)
- Vera (Summer)
- Dimri (Winter)
