= Hysen Vrioni =

Albanian politician

Hysein Vrioni
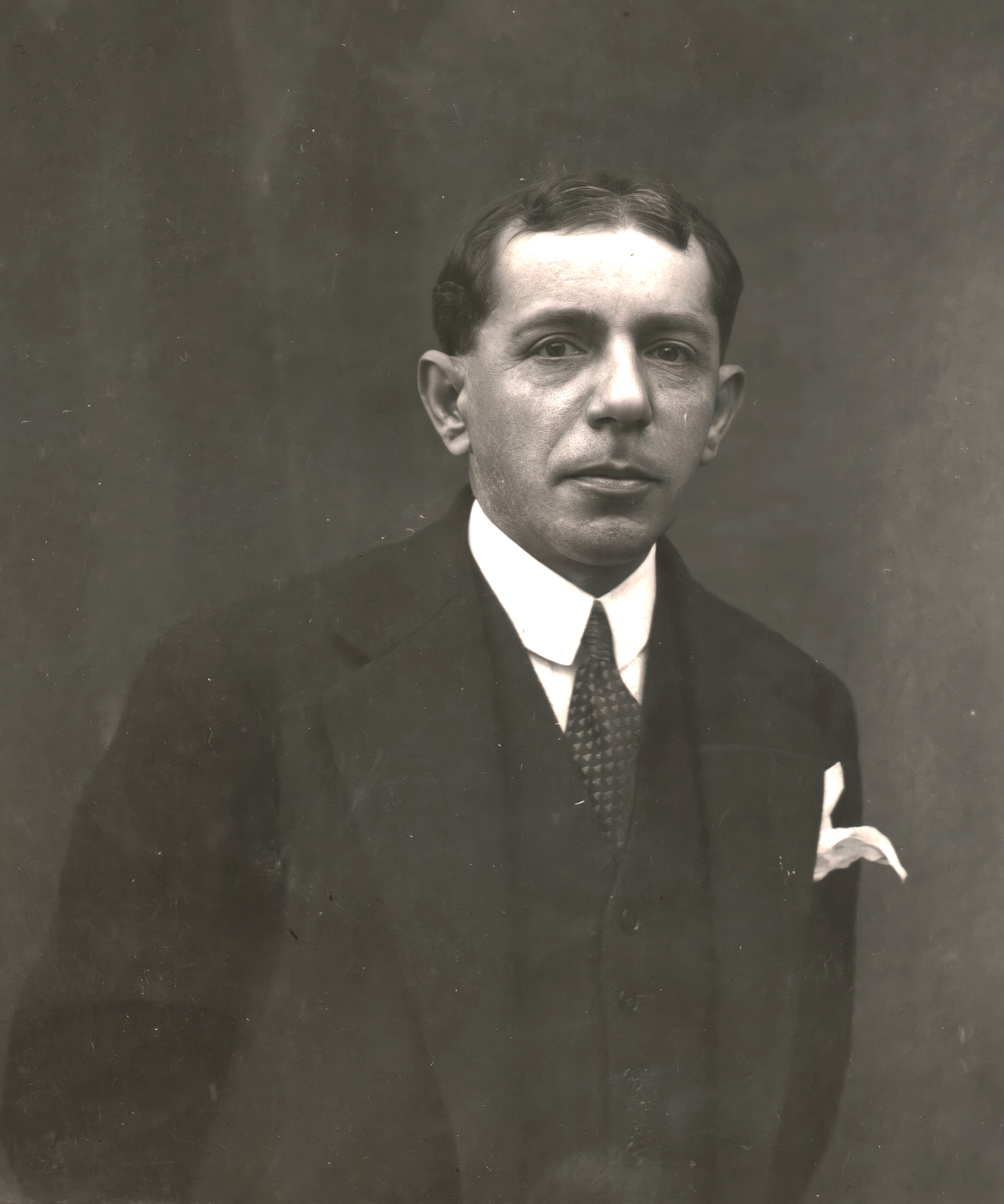

9th Justice Minister of Albania
- In office 24 December 1921 – 12 May 1923
- Prime Minister: Xhafer Ypi; Ahmet Zogu
- Preceded by: Qerim Çelo
- Succeeded by: Milto Tutulani

Personal details
- Born: 1881 Berat, Ottoman Albania
- Died: 12 October 1944 (aged 62–63) Tirana, Albania
- Parent: Aziz Vrioni (father)

Hysen Vrioni, sometime referred to as Hysein Vrioni was an Albanian politician during the 1920s and 1930s.

== Life ==
Hysen Vrioni was the son of Aziz Pasha Vrioni, a member of the influential Vrioni family of south Albania. He studied law and worked as a clerk for the Ottoman Empire before the Albanian Declaration of Independence. Between others, he served as Kaymakam in Tirana. He was part of the delegation that went to Neuwied, Germany in 1914, to offer the Albanian crown to Prince Wilhelm of Wied. The Congress of Lushnje elected him as senator. He was elected in Albanian parliament during 1921–1923 affiliated with Popular Party. He was twice Minister of Justice, in 1921–1922 and 1922–1924. He served also twice as Minister of Foreign Affairs (1925–1927 and 1931–1932).

Vrioni was elected as representative of Berat in Albanian Parliament of 1932, reelected again in 1937. He served for a small time as deputy-speaker of the Parliament.

Hysen Vrioni is remembered for the First Pact of Tirana on November 27, 1926, which he signed on behalf of Ahmet Zogu, while Baron Pompeo Aloisi signed for the Italian side.

The Albanian left-wing leader and bishop Fan Noli had a low opinion on him considering Vrioni's feudal and Ottoman background and his loyalty to Ahmet Zogu, proclaimed King of Albania in 1925. He called Vrioni a "Turkoman".

== Political activity ==
- Senator of the Senate that came out of Congress of Lushnjë, on 31 January 1920
- Minister of Justice: 24 December 1921 – 12 May 1923
- Minister of Foreign Affairs: 28 September 1925 – 10 February 1927
- Minister of Foreign Affairs: 20 April 1931 – 7 December 1932
