= Orli Shuka =

British-Albanian actor (born 1976)

- Born: 27 May 1976 (age 49); Vlorë, Albania
- Occupation: Actor
- Years active: 2004–present
- Notable work: Hyena; Gangs of London
- Father: Agim Shuka
- Relatives: Aleko Pilika (uncle)

Orli Shuka (born 27 May 1976) is a British-Albanian actor best known for his role as Luan, head of the Albanian mafia in Gangs of London. He is the son of Albanian actor Agim Shuka.

== Filmography ==
Film role, unless otherwise noted.

Year	Title	Role	Notes
2014	Hyena	Nikolla Kabashi	
2017	Big Dog	Frotch	Short film
2017	War Machine	Macedonian Guard No. 1	
2018	EastEnders	Robert	4 episodes
2018	Joe All Alone	Kosmy	3 episodes
2019	Save Me	Artem	1 episode
2020–present	Gangs of London	Luan Dushaj	Main cast
2022	All the Old Knives	Ilyas Shishani (Chechen)	
2025	Den of Thieves 2: Pantera	Dragan	
