= Klentiana Mahmutaj =

British lawyer

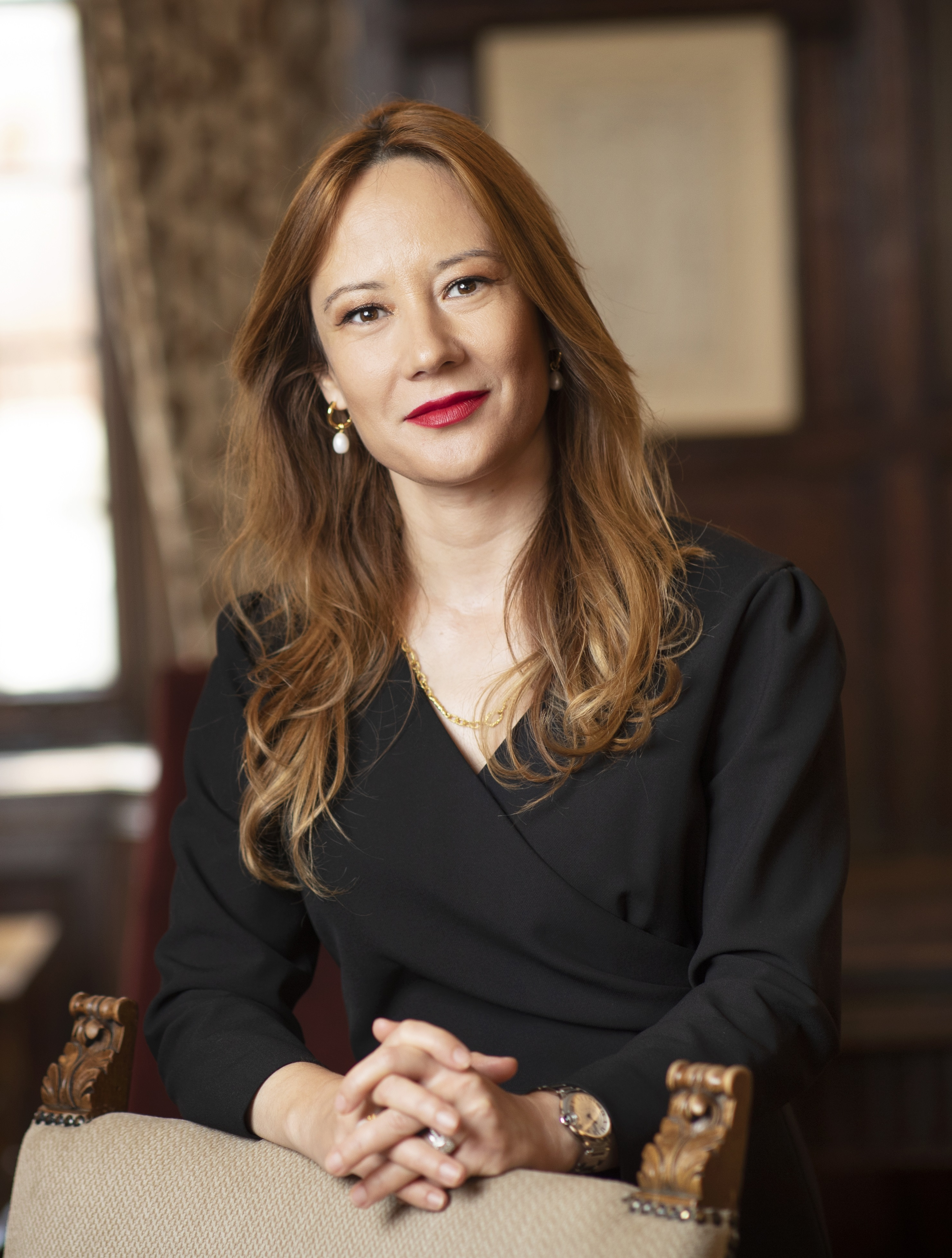
- Klentiana Mahmutaj
- Born: 1979 (age 46–47); Tirana, Albania
- Occupation: Barrister

Klentiana Mahmutaj (born 1979) is a British barrister, author and academic. Mahmutaj was called to the Bar of England & Wales in 2005 (Middle Temple) and practises from Red Lion Chambers, a leading set of chambers in London. She currently holds an appointment from the United Nations Human Rights Council as an independent expert on the Mechanism on the Right to Development. In 2022, The Daily Telegraph described her as "perhaps – after Rita Ora and fellow singer Dua Lipa – the most high-profile Albanian in Britain".

== Early life and education ==
Mahmutaj was born in Tirana, Albania, and graduated in 1997 from Sami Frashëri High School. During her teens, she presented programmes on national television and radio and wrote and published works of poetry. Mahmutaj studied law for a year at University of Tirana before leaving for the United Kingdom on a scholarship.

In 1999-2000, Mahmutaj worked for the British Red Cross assisting in the re-settlement of Kosovar refugees in the UK shortly after NATO's intervention in Kosovo. In 2005-2006 she worked as a radio presenter for the BBC World Service, Albanian Section. Mahmutaj was called to the Bar of England & Wales in 2005, becoming the first Albanian national to qualify as a barrister in the United Kingdom.

== Legal career ==
Mahmutaj practises in white-collar crime, human rights and international arbitration, frequently advising on the impact of domestic legislation on the UK's obligations in human rights law.

In 2007, her book NATO's Intervention in Kosovo: Legal Right or Legal Wrong was published in Albania with a preface by Sir Christopher Greenwood GBE CMG QC.

In 2015, Mahmutaj wrote an article published in The Daily Telegraph on her upbringing in Albania and the role of women in demanding professions, which received worldwide attention.

In 2018, Mahmutaj represented the Government of Albania at a session of the United Nations Human Rights Council's negotiations on the Zero Draft Treaty on Business and Human Rights in Geneva. Mahmutaj has also acted as a consultant to the Slynn Foundation on the work it carried out, under the aegis of the UK's Foreign and Commonwealth Office, on reform of the legal profession in Albania, a project overseen by the late Sir Henry Brooke CMG.

In March 2020, Mahmutaj was appointed by the United Nations Human Rights Council as an independent expert on the Mechanism on the Right to Development, being the first time that an Albanian national was appointed through the Special Procedures selection process for a United Nations mandate. Mahmutaj's mandate was extended by a further three years in February 2023.

Mahmutaj has spoken at legal conferences and has published widely in the UK and abroad in the areas of criminal law, human rights and international arbitration. In November 2022, Mahmutaj spoke at COP27 in Sharm El-Sheikh for a panel examining the "Business Perspective on the Climate Change-Human Rights Nexus" hosted by the International Labour Organization (ILO).

In September 2022, Mahmutaj was described by The Daily Telegraph as "perhaps – after Rita Ora and fellow singer Dua Lipa – the most high-profile Albanian in Britain".

== Personal life ==
Mahmutaj lives in London and is married to James Hayton, a fellow lawyer, with whom she has a son. Mahmutaj's father-in-law is the former BBC television foreign correspondent and news presenter, Philip Hayton.
