= Aziz Vrioni =

Albanian politician

Azix Vrioni
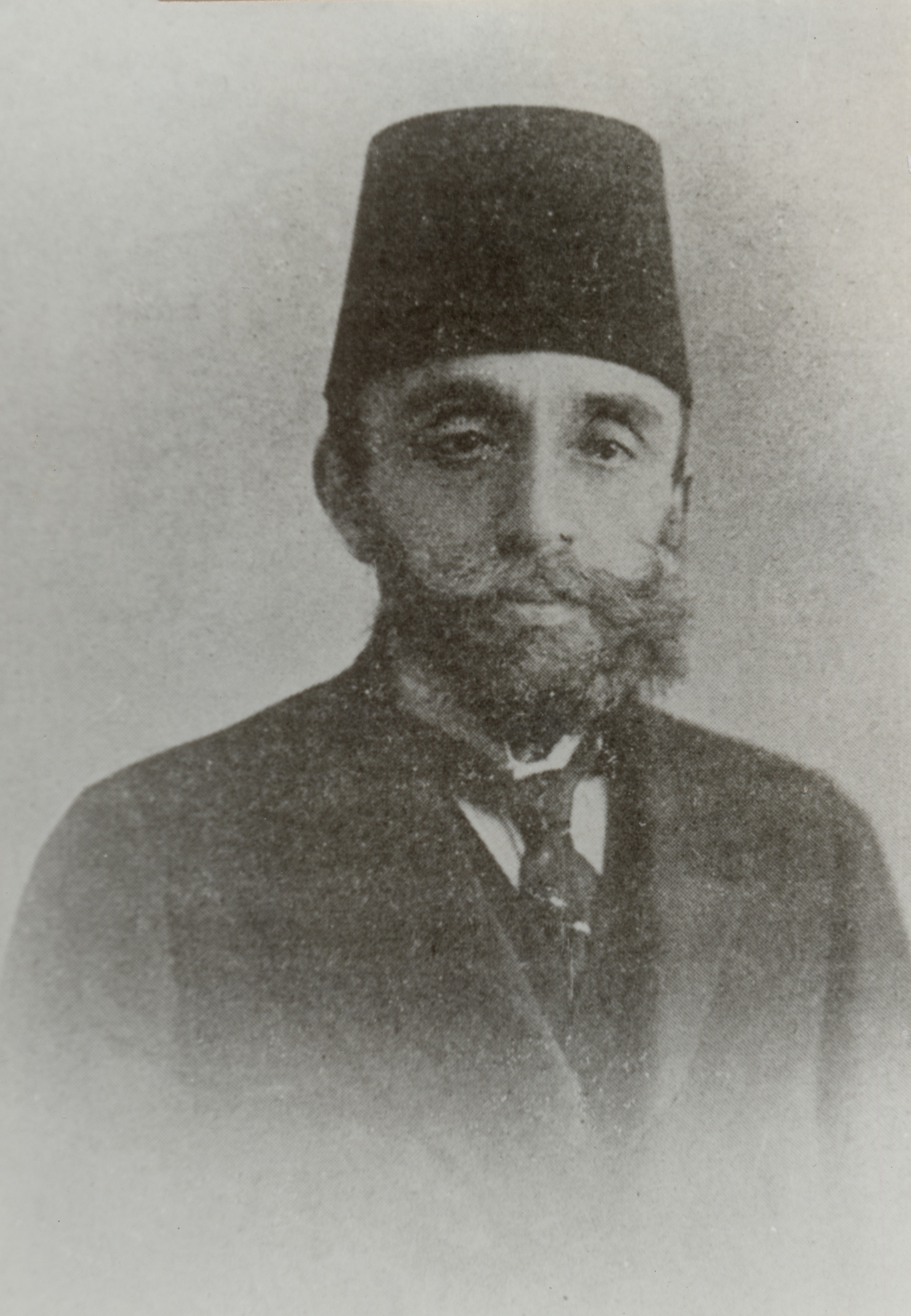

4th Minister of Public Works
- In office 5 October 1914 – 27 January 1916
- Preceded by: Mid'hat Frashëri
- Succeeded by: Sami Vrioni

Member of the Chamber of Deputies in the General Assembly of the Ottoman Empire
- In office 23 December 1908 – 17 January 1912
- Sultan: Abdülhamid II; Mehmed V
- Grand Vizier: Kâmil Pasha; Hüseyin Hilmi Pasha; Ahmet Tevfik Pasha; Ibrahim Hakki Pasha; Mehmed Said Pasha
- Constituency: Sanjak of Avlona

Personal details
- Born: 1859 Berat, Ottoman Empire (modern Albania)
- Died: 1920 (aged 60–61)
- Children: Hysen Vrioni (son)

Aziz Pasha Vrioni (1859–1920) was an Ottoman-Albanian politician of the early 20th century. He was a member of the Ottoman Parliament representing Berat, and Albanian Minister of Finance and Minister of Agriculture and of Mines.

He was born in Berat, Ottoman Empire (modern Albania), member of the influential and well-known Vrioni family. Aziz Pasha Vrioni got involved in the Albanian preparations in the eve of the Albanian Declaration of Independence in 1912. He carried over various ministries of the Albanian governments after.
During the turmoils of 1914 he organized his men into local militia, fighting against the Islamic Peasant Rebels and Greek insurgents. After failing to defend Lushnja, he was shortly arrested by the government of Turhan Pasha Përmeti, accusing him of conspiracy and collaboration with the rebels.
In October 1914, he joined the government of Essad Pasha Toptani in Durrës and was elected General Director of the Administration.

== Political activity ==
- Representative of the Kaza of Berat in the Ottoman Parliament: 16 November 1908
- Prefect of Berat, Albania: November 1912 – 1913
- Minister of Finance of Albania: (Took over from Abdi Toptani in October 1913) 22 January 1914 - 17 March 1914
- General Director of the Albanian Administration: October 1914 - January 1915
- Minister of Agriculture and Mines of Albania: March 1914 - May 1914
- Minister of Public Works of Albania: May 1915 - January 1916
