= Mariela Cingo =

Albanian musician and pianist

Mariela Cingo (born 14 Aug 1978) is an Albanian pianist currently living in the United Kingdom.

== Life and career ==
She started to learn music from the age of six, and gave her first concert at the age of seven. At the age of 17 she moved to the UK to continue her studies at the London College of Music. There she won many prizes, including the Piano Concerto Prize for her performance of Rachmaninoff's Second Piano Concerto. Her recent engagements have included performances of Rachmaninoff's Second Piano Concerto with the Sutton Symphony Orchestra and Schostakovich's Second Piano Concert with the Orchestra of the London College of Music.
