= Omer Pasha Vrioni II =

Prime Minister of Albania (1839–1928)

Personal details
- Born: 1839 Berat, Yanina Eyalet (modern Albania)
- Died: 1928 (aged 88-89)
- Children: Kahreman Pasha Vrioni (Son), Sami Bey Vrioni (Son)
- Known for: Member of Vrioni family League of Prizren; Foundation of Fier, Albania

Omer Pasha Vrioni II (1839–1928), also referred as Ymer or Omar, was an Albanian ruler from one of the most powerful Albanian families of the 19th century. He founded the city of Fier.

== Biography ==
Omer Pasha was a member of the Vrioni landowning family of Berat, Fier and Myzeqe, formerly regions of the Ottoman Vilayet of Yannina, presently in Albania.

He was the founder of the city of Fier in 1864 together with his son, Kahreman Pasha Vrioni.

Vrioni participated as member of the Albanian League of Prizren in 1878, an Albanian endeavor for autonomy opposing the decision of the Treaty of San Stefano and Treaty of Berlin, an important milestone of the Albanian National Awakening that lead to country's Independence in 1912. Vrioni, along with several other Albanian league leaders, was arrested in Preveza and deported to the Dardanelles in 1882 after being invited by Mustafa Assim Pasha, the Ottoman governor general of Yanina to meet with him.

Vrioni was among the contributors to the first Albanian teachers' school, the Shkolla Normale e Elbasanit, a teacher training institution that was founded on 1 December 1909 in Elbasan.

Omar Pasha was the father of Sami Bey Vrioni, Albanian politician and delegate at the Assembly of Vlora of 1912 where the Independence was proclaimed.

He was elected member of Albanian High Council of Regency as a representative of the Bektashi community in December 1921, but then resigned as a sign of opposition to Ahmet Zogu and his clan.

== Political Offices ==
- Member of the High Council of Regency: 24 December 1921 – 11 March 1922.

== Great Achievements ==
- Founder of the city of Fier in 1864.

== See also ==
- Principality of Albania
- Ilias Bey Vrioni
- Sami Bey Vrioni
