= Ilias Vrioni =

Albanian politician

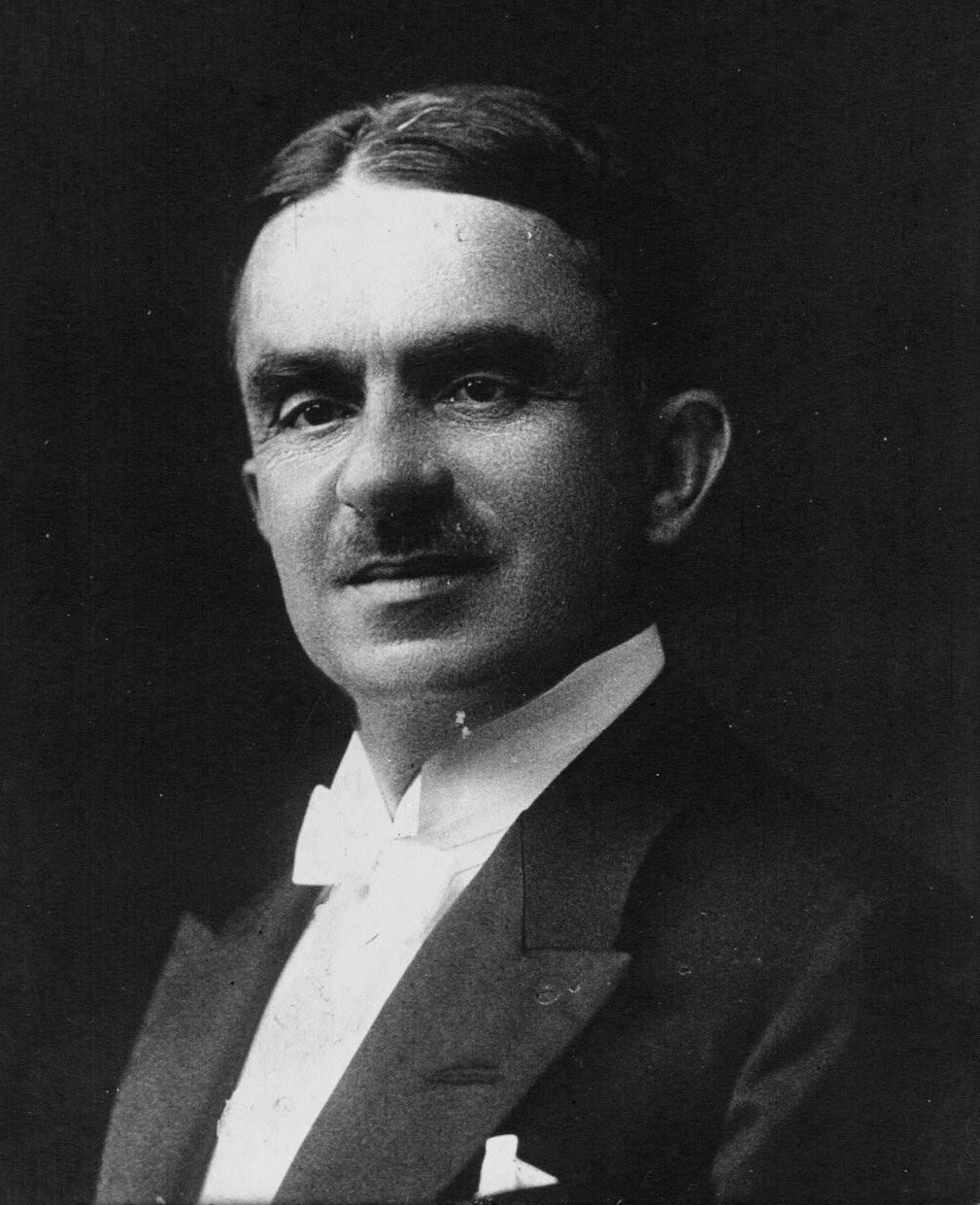

6th Prime Minister of Albania
- In office 19 November 1920 – 16 October 1921
- Monarch: Wilhelm I
- Preceded by: Sulejman Delvina
- Succeeded by: Pandeli Evangjeli
- In office 27 May 1924 – 10 June 1924
- Monarch: Wilhelm I
- Preceded by: Shefqet Vërlaci
- Succeeded by: Fan Noli
- In office 24 December 1924 – 5 January 1925
- Monarch: Wilhelm I
- Preceded by: Fan Noli
- Succeeded by: Ahmet Zogu

Personal details
- Born: 1 January 1882 Berat, Ottoman Empire (modern day Albania)
- Died: 12 March 1932 (aged 50) Paris, France
- Spouse: Xhemile Dino
- Relations: Ferid Vokopola (maternal cousin)
- Children: Isuf Vrioni
- Parent: Mehmet Ali Vrioni (father) Hysnije Vokopola (mother)
- Occupation: politician, diplomat
- Profession: civil servant
- Awards: Grand Officer of the Legion of Honour (France)

Ilias Bey Vrioni (1 January 1882 – 12 March 1932) was an Albanian politician and landowner. He was one of the signatories of the Albanian Declaration of Independence and served as Prime Minister of Albania three times.

== Biography ==
Ilias Vrioni was born in 1882 in Berat, in the Janina Vilayet of the Ottoman Empire, modern day Albania, to Mehmet Ali Pasha of the Vrioni family and Hysnije Vokopola of the Vokopola family, making Ilias maternally a relative to Ferid Vokopola. His household had great chifliks in the surroundings of Berat, Fier, and the Myzeqe plain. His father was a high dignitary of the administration of the Ottoman Empire and collaborator of Abdyl Frashëri at the time of the Congress of Berlin, his mother came from a local landowning family that had their chifliks in the surroundings of Vokopolë.

He was one of the signatories of the Albanian Declaration of Independence in 1912. He served three times as Prime Minister and five times as Minister of Foreign Affairs. He died in Paris in 1932, while serving his second mandate as the Plenipotentiary Minister of the Kingdom of Albania to Paris and London.

He was decorated in 1920s with the order of Grand officier de la Légion d'honneur of the French Republic.

== Political activity ==
- Prime Minister of Albania: 19 November 1920 – 1 July 1921
- Prime Minister of Albania: 11 July 1921 – 16 October 1921
- Minister of Foreign Affairs of Albania: 30 Mars 1924 – 27 May 1924
- Prime Minister of Albania and Minister of Foreign Affairs: 24 December 1924 – 5 January 1925
- Minister of Foreign Affairs of Albania: 12 February 1927 – 21 October 1927
- Minister of Foreign Affairs of Albania and Vice-Minister of Justice: 26 October 1927 – 21 May 1928
- Minister of Foreign Affairs of Albania: 11 May 1928 – 1 September 1928
- Minister of Foreign Affairs of Albania: 5 September 1928 – 13 January 1929
- Plenipotentiary Minister of Albania in Paris and London: 1925 – 1926
- Plenipotentiary Minister of Albania in Paris and London: 1929 – 1932

== See also ==
- Omar Pasha Vrioni II
- Sami Bey Vrioni

Political offices
Preceded by Sulejman Delvina	Prime Minister of Albania; 19 November 1920 – 1 July 1921; 11 July 1921 – 16 October 1921	Succeeded by Pandeli Evangjeli
Preceded by Shefqet Vërlaci	Prime Minister of Albania; 2 June 1924 – 16 June 1924	Succeeded by Theofan Stilian Noli
Preceded by Theofan Stilian Noli	Prime Minister of Albania; 26 December 1924 – 6 January 1925	Succeeded by Ahmet Zogu

== See also ==
- History of Albania
- List of prime ministers of Albania
