= Ullinjas =

- Village
- Location within Albania
- Coordinates: 40°45′N 19°58′E
- Country: Albania
- County: Berat
- Municipality: Berat
- Administrative unit: Otllak
- Time zone: UTC+1 (CET)
  - Summer (DST): UTC+2 (CEST)

Ullinjas is a village in the former municipality of Otllak in Berat County, Albania. At the 2015 local government reform it became part of the municipality Berat.

It was formerly known as Virjon, or Virion (Albanian definite form: Virjoni, Virioni) from where the Vrioni family derived its name.
