= Sami Vrioni =

Albanian politician and diplomat

Sami bey Vrioni
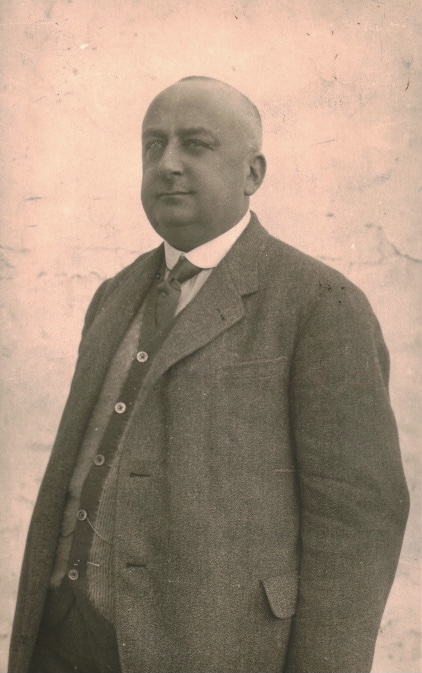

Delegate of Agriculture
- In office 25 December 1918 – 29 January 1920
- Preceded by: Aziz Vrioni

Personal details
- Born: 1868 Berat, Ottoman Empire (modern Albania)
- Died: 1947 (aged 78–79)
- Relations: Kahreman Pasha Vrioni (Brother)
- Parent: Omer Pasha Vrioni II (Father)

Sami Bey Vrioni (1876–1947) was an Albanian politician, diplomat, and a delegate at the Assembly of Vlora which declared the Albanian Declaration of Independence. He was a respected and powerful landowner in the Fier region of Albania.

== Biography ==
Sami Vrioni was a member of the prominent landowning Vrioni family of Berat, Fier and Myzeqe. His father was Omar Pasha Vrioni II (1839–1928). Sami Vrioni himself was owner of around 5,000 Hectares in the agricultural region of southern Myzeqe.

He was one of the delegates of the Albanian Declaration of Independence in 1912, representing Berat region. According to some sources, Ismail Qemali wanted him as part of his cabinet, but his father Omer Pasha was skeptical regarding the Qemali's government. Having served as parliamentary Deputy for Berat in 1912, under Prince Wied he served as a seneschal (Court Chamberlain). He was part of the Albanian delegation in Vienna of April 1917 representing the districts of Skrapar and Berat.

Sami Vrioni had graduated as agronomist and engineer. Along with Albanian he spoke Turkish, Arabic, Italian, and French.

He was a participant of the Congress of Durrës and was elected Minister of Agriculture of the provisional government that came out of it, switching to Minister of Public Works in 1919–1920. According to Sejfi Vllamasi's (1883–1975) memories, Vrioni together with Mustafa Kruja, Fejzi Alizoti, and Myfid Libohova joined the camp of the pro-Italian opponents of the Congress of Lushnjë, with the three others actively trying to persuade or force the delegates not to join the Lushnjë event.

Served as Assemblyman (1924–1925, 1928–1932) and Senator (1925–1928) of the Albanian parliament. Regardless of the fact that he descended from a landowning feudal cast, Sami Vrioni had credibility between the Nolist opposition of early 20s. In February 1924, the opposition was hoping on bringing him up as Prime Minister, which was disregarded by the most powerful group of Ahmet Zogu, who elected Shefqet Vërlaci instead of him. Vrioni was arrested by the communist dictatorship that took power in 1944, he died under torture in 1947 or 1952.

Sami Vrioni was married to the daughter of Essad Pasha Toptani.

== Political Activity ==
- Delegate of the Albanian Declaration of Independence event in 1912
- Court Chamberlain of Prince of Albania, 1914
- Minister of Agriculture of Albania: December 1918 – 1919
- Minister of Public Works of Albania: 1919 – January 1920
- Assemblyman (1924–1925, 1928–1932)
- Member of Albanian Senate (1925–1928)

== See also ==
- Ilias Bey Vrioni
- Omar Pasha Vrioni II
- Albanian Declaration of Independence
